= List of dragons in mythology and folklore =

This is a list of dragons in mythology and folklore.

== African dragons ==
West African dragons	Ayida Wedo	A lwa in Dahomey mythology who is married to Damballa. Ayida Wedo is also mentioned in Haitian Vodou.
West African dragons	Damballa	A lwa in Dahomey mythology who is married to Ayida Wedo. Damballa is also mentioned in Haitian Vodou.
Nigerian dragons	Oshunmare	A serpent or dragon-like shape shifter from Yoruban traditions, associated with Ayida Wedo and Damballa. It is believed to bring fertility and rain storms.
Ghanaian dragons	Bida	A serpent or dragon of Soninke mythology. It inhabited the kingdom of Wagadu. It is said to be a big, black serpentine creature with 7 heads. It is also said to have a long body with the ability to fly. In some descriptions it is said to possess bat-like wings and four claws. Despite being the protectress of the Soninke, the Bida oppressed the people. The Soninke would force its captives to bring the Bida virgin women as sacrifices, in exchange for her ability to rain gold. This would lead to it being vanquished by a young warrior, often named Maadi or Mamani in different interpretations of the story. He did this to save his fiancee from being sacrificed, who also has different names such as Siya Yatabare or Sia Jatta. Incidentally, Bida's death lead to the collapse of the kingdom. After it was slain, Bida's head would soar to the Golden Coast, where gold would be plentiful.
Gambian dragons	Ninki Nanka	The Ninki Nanka is a legendary creature in West African folklore. In Mande folklore, a version is said to inhabit the Niger River as far as the coasts of Guinea and Guinea-Bissau, called the "Ninimini". Descriptions of the creature vary. Some describe it as a river spirit, a river dragon or a swamp dragon, but most contend that the animal is reptilian and dragon-like. According to the Mandinka people, the Ninka Nanka is a dragon with a "large body and small legs". The Mandinka people have also used the term Ninki Nanka to refer to dragons.
Egyptian dragons	Apep or Apophis	The giant Snake or Serpent of Chaos from Egyptian mythology. The Apep is a poisonous serpentine dragon which takes the form of a hooded cobra. who attempted to devour the sun God Ra. This resulted in an eclipse.
Egyptian dragons	Ouroboros	The "tail-eater" snake or serpent. By consuming its tail, it represents eternity.
Egyptian dragons	Akhekh	A draconic creature resembling the Griffin. Descriptions of it vary from being a serpentine dragon or drake with a reptilian head, or having an antelope's body with large wings and a bird's head. Furthermore, the Akhekh has been described as a seclusive dragon or serpent of darkness. The term Akhekh has also been frequently cited as an Egyptian term for dragons.
Egyptian dragons	Denwen	A colossal serpent or dragon engulfed in flames. The Denwen was so fierce and powerful that he terrified even the Gods of Egypt. Furthermore, the Egyptians refer to him as the embodiment of evil, without any chance of redemption. He aimed to attack the divine realm as a symbol of rebellion against cosmic order. However, he was defeated by the spirit of the deceased Pharaoh.
Egyptian dragons	Nehebkau	A serpentine dragon with the limbs of a man. It served the sun God Ra, and was said to be so big the world rested on it. It is believed that this is the reason why Denwen's tail rested in its mouth.
Ethiopian dragons	Arwe or Wainaba	A serpent or dragon king in Ethiopian Folklore. It was killed by Angabo, the father of the queen of Abyssinia.
Congo dragons	Mokele-mbembe	A legendary cryptid from the Democratic Republic of the Congo, rumoured to be a living dinosaur. It is often described as a "half elephant, half dragon" creature. The Pygmies of Congo Basin believe that the Mokele-mbembe is an amphibious, herbivorous water dragon with a large elephantine body. Additionally, various local reports have depicted the Mokele-mbembe as a dragon with three-clawed feet, a long neck and tail and a single horn on its head or tusk-like tooth.
Nyanga dragons	Kirimu	A dragon from the Mwindo Epic. It is described as a large animal with black hide, teeth like a dog, a huge belly, the tail of an eagle and seven horned heads. It is said to dwell in a Virgin Forest. In the Mwindo Epic, it made a blood pact with Nkuba, the Nyanga lightning god. It was eventually slain by the eponymous protagonist of the tale, Mwindo.
Southern African dragons	Grootslang	An elephant-sized serpent that dwells in a cave in Richtersveld, South Africa. Its name means "big snake" in Afrikaans.
Sotho dragons	Monyohe	A dragon-like serpent in Sotho mythology.
Sotho dragons	Nanabolele	A creature from the Thákane Epic, often referred to as a dragon or dragon-like. They are described as large crocodile-like, underwater monsters that glow in the night and always arrive in a cloud of smoke. Additionally, they are dangerous creatures which are feared throughout the land. In the epic, Thákane is tasked by her brothers to obtain the glowing skins of Nanaboleles, in order to create special clothes for them. To accomplish this, she slays a number of the Nanaboleles such as killing one in their sleep and chasing them down with village dogs.
Tsonga dragons	Masingi	A benevolent healer who resides in a clean dwelling.
Zambia Dragons	Nyami Nyami	A Zambezi River God or Spirit. He is said to be a dragon with the body of a snake and the face of a fish.
Zambia Dragons	IIomba	A sea snake with destructive powers, featured in Lozi mythology. It is said to be the creation of a witch doctor.
Zulu dragons	Inkanyamba	A legendary creature of Zulu folklore. It is often described as a giant dragon-like serpent, with the ability to control rain and storms.
Namibian dragons	Namibian Flying Snake	A gargantuan winged serpent or dragon. It is described as being a being is 25 feet in length, having a 30-foot wide wingspan, and a bioluminescent crest and horns. Furthermore, it is described as having the ability to camouflage. Locals have described the Namibian flying snake as having an inflated neck, a bright light emitting from its brow and bat wings. It is also believed to be black or brown with light spots. Additionally, the winged serpent is said to leap from a rock ledge, spread its wings, soar to the ground and land in a huge thump before slithering away. Another trait of the Namibian flying snake is that it is suspected to smell like tar. There have been various reported sightings in Namibia, dating back to 1942 and 1988, including the findings of an Ostriche's Pelvis which was initially believed to be the skull of the serpentine creature.

== European dragons ==
This is a list of European dragons.

Albanian dragons	Bolla	In the Albanian mythology * Bolla (also known as Bullar in South Albania), is a type of serpentine dragon (or a demonic dragon-like creature) with a long, coiled, serpentine body, four legs and small wings in ancient Albanian folklore. This dragon sleeps throughout the whole year, only to wake on Saint George's Day, where its faceted silver eyes peer into the world. The Bolla does this until it sees a human. It devours the person, then closes its eyes and sleeps again. Bolla was worshiped as the deity Boa by the ancestors of Albanians, Illyrians. Bolla appears in the coat of arms of the House of Bua Shpata.
Albanian dragons	Kulshedra	In its twelfth year, the bolla evolves by growing nine tongues, horns, spines and larger wings. At this time it will learn how to use its formerly hidden fire-breathing abilities, and is now called a kulshedra or kuçedra (hydra). The kuçedra causes droughts and lives off human sacrifices. Kulshedras are killed by Drangue, Albanian winged warriors with supernatural powers. Thunderstorms are conceived as battles between the drangues and the kulshedras.
Albanian dragons	Dreq	Dreq is the dragon (draco) proper. It was demonized by Christianity and now is one of the Albanian names of the devil.
Alpine dragons	Tatzelwurm	A lizard-like creature, often described as having the face of a cat, with a serpent-like body which may be slender or stubby, with four short legs or two forelegs.: Austrian: Tatzelwurm/ Praatzelwurm/ Linwurm/ Stutzn/ Bergstutz; Swiss: Stollenwurm/ Tazzelwurm/ Stollwurm; Slovenian: Daadzelwurm/ Hockwurm; German: Daazlwurm/ Praazlwurm; French: Arassas
Catalan dragons	Drac	Catalan dragons are serpent-like creatures with two legs (rarely four) and, sometimes, a pair of wings. Their faces can resemble that of other animals, like lions or cattle. They have a burning breath. Their breath is also poisonous, the reason by which dracs are able to rot everything with their stench. A víbria is a female dragon.
Chuvash dragons	Věri Şělen	Chuvash dragons are winged fire-breathing and shape shifting dragons, they originate with the ancestral Chuvash people.
Celtic dragons	Beithir	In Scottish folklore, the beithir is a large snakelike creature or dragon. Depicted with different numbers of limbs, without wings. Instead of fiery breath, Beithir was often associated with lightning.
Celtic dragons	Y Ddraig Goch	In Welsh mythology, after a long battle (which the Welsh King Vortigern witnesses) a red dragon defeats a white dragon; Merlin explains to Vortigern that the red dragon symbolizes the Welsh, and the white dragon symbolizes the Saxons – thus foretelling the ultimate defeat of the English by the Welsh. The ddraig goch appears on the Welsh national flag.
French dragons	Dragon	Authors tend often to present the dragon legends as symbol of Christianity's victory over paganism, represented by a harmful dragon. The French representation of dragons spans much of European history.: Guivres from Medieval France; Graoully of Metz, symbol of Christianization over paganism.
French dragons	Tarasque	A fearsome legendary dragon-like mythological hybrid from Provence, tamed by Saint Martha.
French dragons	Guivre	a Dragon like creature from French mythology, with a venomous bite, Guivre meaning wyvern or wyrm, or even serpent which the creatures name is derived from.
French dragons	Peluda La Velue, cover of a French pamphlet (1889)	Also known as The Shaggy Beast, or La Velue, a legendary dragon from La Ferté-Bernard that shot deadly quills from its back.
Germanic dragons	Wyvern	Wyverns are common in medieval heraldry. Their usual blazon is statant. Wyverns are normally shown as dragons with two legs and two wings.: Bignor Hill dragon, there is a brief mention of a dragon on Bignor Hill south of the village of Bignor near the famous Roman Villa, apparently "A large dragon had its den on Bignor Hill, and marks of its folds were to be seen on the hill". Similar legends have been told of ridges around other hills, such as at Wormhill in Derbyshire.; Bisterne Dragon, the New Forest folktale states that the dragon lived in Burley, Hampshire, and terrorised the village of Bisterne. It was finally killed in Lyndhurst, Hampshire by Sir Maurice de Berkeley and its body turned into a hill called Boltons Bench. Though the knight survived, the trauma of the battle drove him mad, and soon after he returned to the hill to die, his corpse becoming a yew tree.; Blue Ben of Kilve, in West Somerset is said to have once been home to a dragon called Blue Ben which the devil used as a steed. The skull of a fossilised ichthyosaur on display in the local museum is sometimes pointed out as belonging to Blue Ben.; Green Dragon of Mordiford, of Herefordshire folklore; Dragon of Loschy Hill, of Yorkshire folklore; Unnamed dragon defeated by Beowulf and Wiglaf in the Anglo-Saxon epic poem Beowulf.
Germanic dragons	Longwitton dragon	Of Northumbrian legend.
Germanic dragons	Worm hill dragon	700 AD the Anglo-Saxons settled and called it "Wruenele" this translates as "Wruen" worm, reptile or dragon and "ele" hill. According to local folklore the hill at Knotlow (Derbyshire) was the lair of a dragon and the terraces around it were made by the coils of its tail. Knotlow is an ancient volcanic vent and this may explain the myth.
Germanic dragons	Knucker	A kind of water dragon, living in knuckerholes in Sussex, England.
Germanic dragons	St. Leonard's Forest dragons	Of Sussex folklore.
Germanic dragons	Lindworm	Lindworms are serpent-like dragons with either two or no legs. In Germanic heraldry, the lindworm looks the same as a wyvern.: Fafnir, a dragon slain by Sigurd in Nordic mythology.; Jörmungandr, a sea serpent or dragon in Nordic mythology.; Níðhöggr from Nordic mythology.; Lagarfljótsormurinn, a lake monster or dragon living in the Lagarfljót, near Egilsstaðir, in Iceland.; Stoor worm, an Orcadian sea serpent slain by the hero Assipattle.; Lambton Worm, according to Northumbrian legend, curled around Worm Hill near Fatfield in northeast England, eating livestock and children, and was killed during the time of the Crusades by a Sir John Lambton.; Laidly Worm of Spindleston Heugh, of Northumbrian legend.; Worm of Linton
Germanic dragons	Flogdrake	A Swedish wingless limbless serpentine dragon which flyes over the night sky like a streak of light, and lives in mountain tunnels it drills.
Germanic dragons	Puk	Puk is a serpentine-bodied, four-footed dragon (with sometimes wings), sometimes with many heads, appearing in the legends of Estonia, Lithuania, Latvia, and Germany. The name stems from the house spirit "schrat", which is variously called "puk" (also found in English as Puck), as such beings have been thought to transform into dragons in order to protect, gather and transport treasure (cf. the story of Fafnir).: Slavic - Krukis; Germany - Puk, Puks, Puck; Latvia - Pukis; Lithuania - Pukys, Kaukas, Kaukas; Estonia - Pukje, Pisuhand, Tulihand, Puuk
Greek dragons	Drákōn – δράκων	Cadmus fighting the Ismenian dragon (which guarded the sacred spring of Ares) is a legendary story from the Greek lore dating to before c. 560–550 B.C. Greek dragons commonly had a role of protecting important objects or places. For example, the Colchian dragon watched the Golden Fleece and the Nemean dragon guarded the sacred groves of Zeus. The name comes from the Greek "drakeîn" meaning "to see clearly".: Hydra, also called the Lernaean Hydra, from Greek Mythology is described as a dragon-like animal; Ladon from Greek mythology; Python, from Greek mythology, the snake killed by Apollo; Typhon from Greek mythology is often thought of as a dragon
Greek dragons	Agathodaemon	Agathodeamons numinous presence could be represented in art as a serpent in the classical Greek period.
Greek dragons	Amphisbaena	A mythological, ant-eating serpent with a head at each end.
Greek dragons	Jaculus	A small mythical serpent or dragon. It can be shown with wings and sometimes has front legs.
Hungarian dragons	Fernyiges	A black dragon that is the lord of dragons.
Hungarian dragons	Sárkány	A dragon in human form. Most are giants with more than one head, in which their strength resides. They become weaker as they lose them. In the contemporary Hungarian language, sárkány is used to mean any kind of dragon.
Hungarian dragons	Zomok	A giant winged snake. It often serves as flying mount of the garabonciás (a kind of magician). The sárkánykígyó rules over storms and bad weather.
Italian dragons	Tarantasio	A dragon that lived in Gerundo Lake between Milan, Lodi and Cremona.
Irish Dragons	Oilliphéist	Freshwater serpents.
Irish Dragons	Cathach	
Irish Dragons	Dabran	
Irish Dragons	Farbagh	
Irish Dragons	Muirdris	
Irish Dragons	Ellén Trechend	
Leonese and Asturian dragons	Cuélebre	In Asturian and Leonese mythology the Cuélebres are giant winged serpents, which live in caves where they guard treasures and kidnapped xanas. They can live for centuries and, when they grow really old, they use their wings to fly. Their breath is poisonous and they often kill cattle to eat. The Leonese term Cuelebre comes from Latin colŭbra, i.e., snake.: It is also a name for a maiden cursed into a dragon in the story of the same name.
Lithuanian dragons	Slibinas	This dragon is more of a hydra with multiple heads, though sometimes it does appear with one head.
Lithuanian dragons	Aitvaras	Aitvaras is described as a bird with the appearance of a dragon outdoors. An aitvaras will lodge itself in a house and most often refuse to leave. It brings both good and bad luck to the inhabitants of the house, providing its adopted home with stolen gold and grain, often getting the household into trouble.
Lithuanian dragons	Žaltys	A household spirit in Lithuanian mythology. Part of prussian, Baltic, Latvian and Lithuanian mythology.
Polish dragons	Wawel Dragon	Also known as Smok Wawelski, from Polish folklore, a dragon that lived in a cave on Wawel Hill on the bank of Vistula River in Kraków and was killed by a clever shoemaker's apprentice.
Polish dragons	Krepel	Also known as the Bytom Dragon; said to inhabit forests near Bytom. A young farmhand attempted to kill the creature for its treasure, but ended up befriending the dragon.
Spanish / Hispanic dragons	Coca	A mythical ghost-monster, equivalent to the bogeyman, found in many Hispanic or Spanish speaking countries. The Cucuy is a male being while Cuca is a female version of the mythical monster. In Portuguese mythology coca is a female dragon that fights with Saint George. She loses her strength when Saint George cuts off one of her ears. The Tarasca/ Coca was originally related to the Tarasque of France.
Romanian dragons	Balaur, Zburator	Balaur are very similar to the Slavic zmey: very large, with fins and multiple heads.
Slavic dragons	Zmey, zmiy, żmij, змей, or zmaj, or drak, or smok	Similar to the conventional European dragon, but multi-headed. They breathe fire and/or leave fiery wakes as they fly. In Slavic and related tradition, dragons symbolize evil. Specific dragons are often given Turkic names (see Zilant), symbolizing the long-standing conflict between the Slavs and Turks. However, in Serbian and Bulgarian folklore, dragons are defenders of the crops in their home regions, fighting against a destructive demon Ala, whom they shoot with lightning.: Zirnitra, dragon-god in Wendish mythology. It was later used in the Royal Danish heraldry as a representation of Wendland; Zmey Gorynych – The dragon of the Slavic mythology. Its name is translated as "snake son-of-mountain" (due to the fact it lives in a mountain), it has three heads, wings, and it spits fire.; Chudo-Yudo – The dragon in Slavic mythology. Often multiheaded with any number of heads from three to ninety, it is most often an evil entity that kidnaps royal maidens or endanger the whole cities. Sometimes, he has a body of a giant human with heads of the serpent-like dragon. Most often supernaturally strong, sometimes with fiery breath, he is usually the main evil character in the story, though in some he is actually good or helping. In some versions, he is related to Koshchey the Deathless or Baba Yaga; in others, he is either of these two characters in their different form. Chudo-Yudo has a similarity to Greek Hydra, through to the fact that his head grow back (and sometimes multiply) when cut, so a lot of cunning is needed to beat him.
Tatar dragons	Zilant	Similar to a wyvern or cockatrice, the Zilant is the symbol of the city of Kazan. Zilant itself is a Russian rendering of Tatar yılan, i.e., snake. By the Tataro-Bulgarian mythology lived in present-day Kazan and is represented on the city's coat of arms.

== Asian dragons ==
=== West Asian dragons ===
Anatolian dragons	Illuyanka	Originating from Hittite mythology, a serpentine dragon slain by Tarḫunz.
Anatolian dragons	Ebren	The Turkish dragon secretes flames from its tail, and there is no mention in any legends of its having wings, or even legs.
Arabian dragons	Al Tinnin	It contains 31 stars. It became known to Arabs through translations Greek.
Arabian dragons	Falak	A dragon or serpent of Middle Eastern legend
Arabian dragons	Bahamut	A gigantic cosmic winged sea serpent and later became a dragon via borrowing characteristics from Judeo-Christian Leviathan and Bahamut from modern media.
Armenian dragons	Vishap	Related to European dragons, usually depicted as a winged snake or with a combination of elements from different animals.
Armenian dragons	Dragon of Hayk	Symbol of Hayk Nahapet and Haykaznuni dynasty in Armenia. Usually depicted as seven-headed serpent.
Levantine dragons	Yam	The god of the sea in the Canaanite pantheon from Levantine mythology.
Levantine dragons	Lotan	A demonic dragon reigning the waters, a servant of the sea god Yam defeated by the storm god Hadad-Baʿal in the Ugaritic Baal Cycle. From Levantine mythology and Hebrew scriptures.
Levantine dragons	Leviathan	A creature with the form of a sea monster from Jewish belief and from Levantine mythology.
Mesopotamian dragons	Abzu	from Babylonian mythology, sometimes considered dragons. Would have been located in now present-day Iraq and Syria.
Mesopotamian dragons	Mušḫuššu	A creature from ancient Mesopotamian mythology found on Ishtar Gate. A mythological hybrid, it is a scaly dragon with hind legs resembling the talons of an eagle, feline forelegs, a long neck and tail, a horned head, a snake-like tongue, and a crest. Name means "reddish snake", sometimes also translated as "fierce snake".
Mesopotamian dragons	Tiamat	From Babylonian mythology, sometimes considered dragons. Would have been located in now present-day Iraq and Syria.
Mesopotamian dragons	Kur	Kur, the first ever dragon from ancient Sumer, now present-day Southern Iraq.
Persian dragons	Azhdaha	A mythical reptilian creature that derives from Persian folklore, a gigantic snake or lizard-like creatures sometimes associated with rains and living in the air, in the sea, or on the earth. It is said that eating the heart of an Azhdaha brings courage and bravery.
Persian dragons	Ur	The king of the World of Darkness in Mandaeism, portrayed as a dragon or snake.
Persian dragons	Zahhak	A dragon or serpent described with three heads, and one of the heads is human. However, in later text Zahhak are described a human with two snakes growing off of each shoulder. Zahhak originate in old Persian and Zoroastrian mythology. In some translated versions of the book Alif Laylah (One Thousand and One Arabian Nights) Zahhak is described as a giant python-like serpent having a hood like cobra.: Aži Zairita, from Zoroastrian mythology (Avesta), the 'yellow dragon,' that is killed by the hero Kərəsāspa (In Middle Persian Kirsāsp).; Aži Raoiδita, from Zoroastrian mythology (Avesta), the 'red dragon' conceived by Angra Mainyu's to bring about the 'daeva-induced winter' that is the reaction to Ahura Mazda's creation of the Airyanem Vaejah.
Persian dragons	Agorghan	A seven-headed dragon, possibly derived from the Gorgon.
Persian dragons	Ashmog	A dragon from Zoroastrian mythology.

=== South Asian dragons ===
Indian dragons	Nāga	A serpentine dragon common to all cultures influenced by Hinduism. They are often cloaked like a mongoose and may have several heads depending on their rank. They usually have no arms or legs but those with limbs resemble the Chinese dragon. Many of the naga are more inclined towards larger snakes, not dragons.: Apalāla also known as "Naga King", is a water-dwelling dragon in Buddhist mythology and said to live near the Swat River. The dragon was said to have converted to Buddhism.; Kaliya nag, from Indian mythology which was defeated by lord Krishna. It is said that Krishna did not kill the snake and left it. The Kaliya Nag is said to have more than 1000 fangs.; Bhogavati, "peopled by snakes" in Hindi, is the residence of the Nāga King Varuṇa.
Indian dragons	Mahoraga	The Mahoraga (Sanskrit: महोरग), also pronounced as Maha-Uraga ("Greater Reptilians") are a race of deities in Buddhism, and Jainism. They are the exalted ones among the Uragas, a race of primordial reptilian beings who are cousins to the nāga. Like the nāga, they are often depicted as anthropomorphic beings with reptilian bodies from the waist down. However, their appearance can differ depending on artistic tradition, sometimes having serpent skin with humanoid bodies.
Indian dragons	Vritra	Vritra, also known as "Ahi", is a serpent or dragon and is a major asura in Vedic religion. He is the personification of drought, and adversary of Indra the thunder god and king of heaven. He appears as a dragon blocking the course of the rivers and is heroically slain by Indra. The term ahi is cognate with the Zoroastrian Azi Dahaka.
Indian dragons	Pakhangba	A Manipuri dragon, a giant serpent that relates to humans.
Indian dragons	Poubi Lai	Poubi Lai (also, Paubi Loi) was an ancient dragon python, who dwelled in the Loktak Lake of Manipur, in Meitei mythology and folklore. It is also referred to as "Loch Ness Monster of Manipur".
Indian dragons	Taoroinai	Taoroinai (Meitei: ꯇꯥꯎꯔꯣꯢꯅꯥꯢ, romanized: taau-roy-naay) is a snake-like dragon in Meitei mythology and religion. It lived in the land of the Moon. According to the Shakok Lamlen, the Kangla was constructed over the navel of Taoroinai.

=== Southeast Asian dragons ===
Indonesian/Malay dragons	Naga or Nogo	Derived from the Indian nāga, belief in the Indo-Malay dragon spread throughout Maritime Southeast Asia with Hinduism. The word naga is still the common Malay/Indonesian term for dragon. Like its Indian counterpart, the naga is considered divine in nature, benevolent, and often associated with sacred mountains, forests, or certain parts of the sea.. In Indonesia, particularly Javanese and Balinese mythology, a naga is depicted as a crowned, giant, magical serpent, and sometimes winged.: Antaboga or Anantaboga, a Javanese and Balinese world serpent. It is a naga of Javanese origin, derivative of Shiva-Hinduism Ananta Shesha
Khmer dragons	Neak	The Khmer dragon, or neak is derived from the Indian nāga. Like its Indian counterpart, the neak is often depicted with cobra like characteristics such as a hood. The number of heads can be as high as nine, the higher the number the higher the rank. Odd-headed dragons are symbolic of male energy while even headed dragons symbolize female energy. Traditionally, a neak is distinguished from the often serpentine Makar and Tao, the former possessing crocodilian traits and the latter possessing feline traits. A dragon princess is the heroine of the creation myth of Cambodia.
Filipino dragons	Bakunawa	The Bakunawa, who was initially a beautiful goddess, appears as a gigantic serpent that lives in the sea. Ancient natives believed that the Bakunawa caused the moon or the sun to disappear during an eclipse. It is said that during certain times of the year, the Bakunawa arises from the ocean and proceeds to swallow the moon whole. To keep the Bakunawa from completely eating the moon, the natives would go out of their houses with pots and pans in hand and make a noise barrage in order to scare the Bakunawa into spitting out the moon back into the sky. The creature is present in Bicolano and Visayan mythologies. It is blocked by the moon goddess Haliya in Bicolano mythology, while in Visayan mythology, it is stopped by the god of death, Sidapa.
Filipino dragons	Láwû	A serpent from Kapampangan mythology which seeks to swallow the moon, and causes lunar eclipses.
Filipino dragons	Olimaw	A winged phantom dragon-serpent from Ilokano mythology. It seeks to swallow the moon.
Filipino dragons	Sawa	A huge serpent monster from Tagalog and Ati mythologies. It attempts to swallow the moon and sun. It is blocked by the god of the sun, Apolaki, and goddess of the moon, Mayari.
Filipino dragons	Samal Naga	A gigantic, trapped dragon in the milky way. It is said that it will be freed and devour all those not faithful to their respective deities in Samal mythology.
Filipino dragons	Kanlaon dragon	A mad dragon which used to live in Mount Kanlaon in Negros Island. According to Hiligaynon mythology, it was defeated by the epic heroes, Laon and Kan.
Vietnamese dragons	Rồng or Long	A dragon that is represented with a spiral tail and a long fiery sword-fin. Dragons were personified as a caring mother with her children or a pair of dragons. Much like the Chinese Dragon, The Vietnamese Dragon is a water deity responsible for bringing rain during times of drought. Images of the Dragon King have 5 claws, while images of lesser dragons have only 4 claws.: Con rit is a water dragon from Vietnamese mythology.

=== East Asian dragons ===
Chinese dragons	Lóng (Lung^{2} in Wade-Giles romanization.)	The Chinese dragon, is a creature in Chinese mythology and is sometimes called the Oriental (or Eastern) dragon. Depicted as a long, snake-like creature with four legs, it has long been a potent symbol of auspicious power in Chinese folklore and art. This type of dragon, however, is sometimes depicted as a creature constructed of many animal parts and it might have the fins of fish, or the horns of a stag.: Azure Dragon a dragon that represents the east and the spring season, in Chinese mythology and one of the Four Symbols (Chinese constellation).; Dragon King, a water and weather god in Chinese mythology.; Gonggong a destructive water god or monster in Chinese mythology; Yellow Dragon of the Center in Chinese mythology.; Fucanglong of the volcanic element, and god of crafting.; Tianlong, a celestial dragon in Chinese mythology.; Jiaolong, defined as a "scaled dragon", is a dragon in Chinese mythology.; Panlong, the "coiled dragon", is an aquatic dragon resembling a jiaolong in Chinese mythology, an ancient motif in Chinese art, and a proper name.; Shenlong, "god dragon" or "divine dragon", s a spiritual dragon from Chinese mythology who is the master of storms and also a bringer of rain. He is of equal significance to other creatures such as Tianlong, the celestial dragon.; Dilong, "earth dragon", one of many types of -long dragons such as shenlong and huanglong, the "Yellow Dragon".; Qiulong, a Chinese dragon was contradictorily defined as "horned dragon" and "hornless dragon".; Yinglong, "responsive dragon", is a winged dragon and rain deity in ancient Chinese mythology.; Teng, "a flying dragon", "flying-dragon snake", "soaring snake", is a flying dragon in Chinese mythology.
Chinese dragons	Bashe or Pa snake	Bashe was a python-like Chinese mythological giant snake that ate elephants.
Japanese dragons	Ikuchi	A water dragon youkai in Japanese mythology.
Japanese dragons	Tatsu	Dragon of Japanese mythology, and the master of the water, like the Ryu.
Japanese dragons	Orochi	the eight-headed serpent slain by Susanoo in Japanese mythology.
Japanese dragons	Kuraokami	A Japanese dragon and a deity of rain and snow.
Japanese dragons	Ryū	Similar to Chinese dragons, with three claws instead of four. They are usually benevolent, associated with water, and may grant wishes.: Ryūjin, the dragon god of the sea in Japanese mythology.
Japanese dragons	Kuzuryū	A nine-headed dragon.
Japanese dragons	Gozuryū	A five-headed dragon.
Japanese dragons	Hiryū	The Hiryū (called Hai-Riyo in some English sources) are fabulous composites from Japanese mythology. They have the body, claws, and wings of a bird with the head of a dragon. The Hai-Riyo are related to the Ying-Lung.
Japanese dragons	Uwabami	Often used to describe a giant serpent or giant python in the legends of Japan. During different periods of history, they have been referred to as orochi, daija, and uwabami, but all of these refer to the same creature.
Korean dragons	Yong (Mireu)	A sky dragon, essentially the same as the Chinese lóng. Like the lóng, yong and the other Korean dragons are associated with water and weather. In pure Korean, it is also known as 'mireu'.
Korean dragons	Imoogi	A hornless ocean dragon, sometimes equated with a sea serpent. Imoogi literally means, "Great Lizard". The legend of the Imoogi says that the sun god gave the Imoogi their power through a human girl, which would be transformed into the Imoogi on her 17th birthday. Legend also said that a dragon-shaped mark would be found on the shoulder of the girl, revealing that she was the Imoogi in human form.
Korean dragons		A mountain dragon. In fact, the Chinese character for this word is also used for the imoogi.
Taiwanese dragons	Han Long	A dragon that holds the power to cause droughts in Taiwanese folklore.
Tibetan dragons	Druk	From Tibetan and Himalayan Mythology, a Dragon of Thunder similar to Shenlong in China, this Orb holding serpentine creature lives in the remote areas of Mt. Everest and gives snow and rain to the Tibetan people. Some say they are protectors of Shangrila.
Siberian dragons	Erenkyl	Erenkyl, the mythical dragon of the Yakuts (Sakha).
Siberian dragons	Yilbegän	Related to European Turkic and Slavic dragons, multi-headed man-eating monster in the mythology of Turkic peoples of Siberia, as well as Siberian Tatars.

== Oceanian dragons ==
Polynesian dragons	Hatuibwari	Human-headed winged serpent from the Solomon Islands.
Polynesian dragons	Kihawahine	Kihawahine is described as a woman, a giant black lizard, or a dragon with red or auburn hair. She may be missing an eye, lost in a battle with Haumea. Kihawahine is the oldest Aumakua or spiritual helper in Hawaii.
Polynesian dragons	Kalamainuʻu	In Hawaiian mythology, Kalamainu'u (alternate spelling Kalanimainu'u) was a lizard goddess.
Polynesian dragons	Mo'o	Moʻo are shapeshifting lizard spirits in Hawaiian mythology.
Polynesian dragons	Taniwha	In Māori mythology, they are large supernatural beings that live in deep pools in rivers, dark caves, or in the sea, especially in places with dangerous currents or deceptive breakers (giant waves).
Aboriginal Australian dragons	Aranda	A sea serpent.
Aboriginal Australian dragons	Rainbow Serpent	A dragon-like deity archtype seen as a giver of life, due to its association with water and rain.
Aboriginal Australian dragons	Mirreeulla	More commonly called the Hawkesbury River Monster, a reptilian cryptid from the Hawkesbury River.

== American dragons ==
=== North American Dragons ===
Eastern Woodlands Indigenous dragons	Piasa Bird	A Native American dragon of Illini people. Piasa Bird is a Native American dragon depicted in one of two murals painted by Native Americans on bluffs (cliffsides) above the Mississippi River.
Eastern Woodlands Indigenous dragons	Horned Serpent	One of the most common form of native American dragons, a recurring figure among many indigenous tribes of the Southeast Woodlands and other tribal groups.
Eastern Woodlands Indigenous dragons	Mishipeshu	Known in english as the Underwater Panther, a giant scaly and horned lnyx that dwells underwater and guards copper.
Eastern Woodlands Indigenous dragons	Gaasyendietha	A lake dragon or serpent of the Great Lakes, found in Seneca mythology.
Great Plains dragons	Mi-ni-wa-tu	A dragon-like horned serpent of the Lakota peoples' mythology.
Great Plains dragons	Unhcegila	A horned serpent also of Lakota mythology.
Southwest dragons	Palulukon	Palulukon is a class of water serpent to the Hopi of North America.
Southwest dragons	Awanyu	Horned or plumed guardian serpent in Tewa myth.
Pacific Northwest dragons	Sisiutl	A sea serpent with two horned serpent heads and a human face in Kwakwakaʼwakw and other Pacific Northwest myth and religion.
Pacific Northwest dragons	Amhuluk	A poisonous horned serpentine beast from Kalapuya myth that drowns people.
European-American dragons	Thevetat	Corrupting dragon from american esoteric cosmology and Theosophy of the 19th century.
European-American dragons	Cadborosaurus or Caddy	A sea serpent in the folklore of regions of the Pacific Coast of North America.
European-American dragons	Snallygaster	A tentacled dragon of appalachian Maryland.
European-American dragons	Pennsylvania Dutch Dragon	Appear in Pennsylvania Dutch folklore of Pennsylvania. Many are transformed humans.
Mesoamerican dragons	Quetzalcoatl	From Aztec mythology, has a dragon-like aspect.
Mesoamerican dragons	Xiuhcoatl	A serpent from Aztec mythology.
Mesoamerican dragons	Kukulkan	A Mayan mythological serpent god.
Mesoamerican dragons	Q'uq'umatz	A dragon or serpent god from Mayan K'iche' mythology.

=== South American dragons ===
Brazilian dragons	Boitatá	The name comes from the Old Tupi language and means "fiery serpent" (mboî tatá). Its great fiery eyes leave it almost blind by day, but by night, it can see everything. According to legend, Boi-tatá one was a big serpent which survived a great deluge.
Paraguayan dragons	Teju Jagua	Teju Jagua from Guaraní mythology is described was a huge lizard with seven dog-like heads, entitled to a "fiery gaze", and being associated as the god of fruits, caves and (more common with the Dragons in Europe) as the protector of hidden treasures.
Inca dragons	Amaru	Dragon or rather a Chimera of Inca Mythology. It had multiple heads consisting of either a puma's, a condor's, or a llama's head with a fox's muzzle, condor wings, snake's body, fish's tail, and coated in crocodilian or lizard scales. It was found frequently throughout Andean iconography and naming within the empire, and likely predates the rise of the Inca.
Mapuche dragons	Ten Ten-Vilu	The serpent god of earth and fertility in traditional Mapuche religion. Part of the myth of the Legend of Trentren Vilu and Caicai Vilu.
Mapuche dragons	Coi Coi-Vilu	The serpent god of water, and the ruler of the sea in traditional Mapuche religion. Created by the god Ngenechen from his sons after a fight he had with them.

== Common dragons with unknown origin ==
- Azazel from the Abrahamic religions, is described as a dragon in the Apocalypse of Abraham.
- Sea serpent, a water dragon found in mythology and legends throughout the world.
- The unnamed five-headed dragon subdued by the Buddhist goddess Benzaiten at Enoshima in Japan in A.D. 552
- The unnamed dragon defeated by Saint George.
- Cockatrice, a two-legged dragon or serpent-like creature with a rooster's head.
- Basilisk, a legendary reptile reputed to be a serpent king, who can cause death with a single glance.

=== Other serpentine creatures in mythology and folklore ===
- Brnensky drak (The dragon of Brno, Czech), the dragon killed nearby Moravian city (legend)
- The Ljubljana dragon, the protector dragon of Ljubljana, capital of Slovenia.

== See also ==
- Dragons in Manipuri mythology
- List of dragons in literature
- List of dragons in popular culture
