= Korean dragon =

Legendary creature in Korean mythology

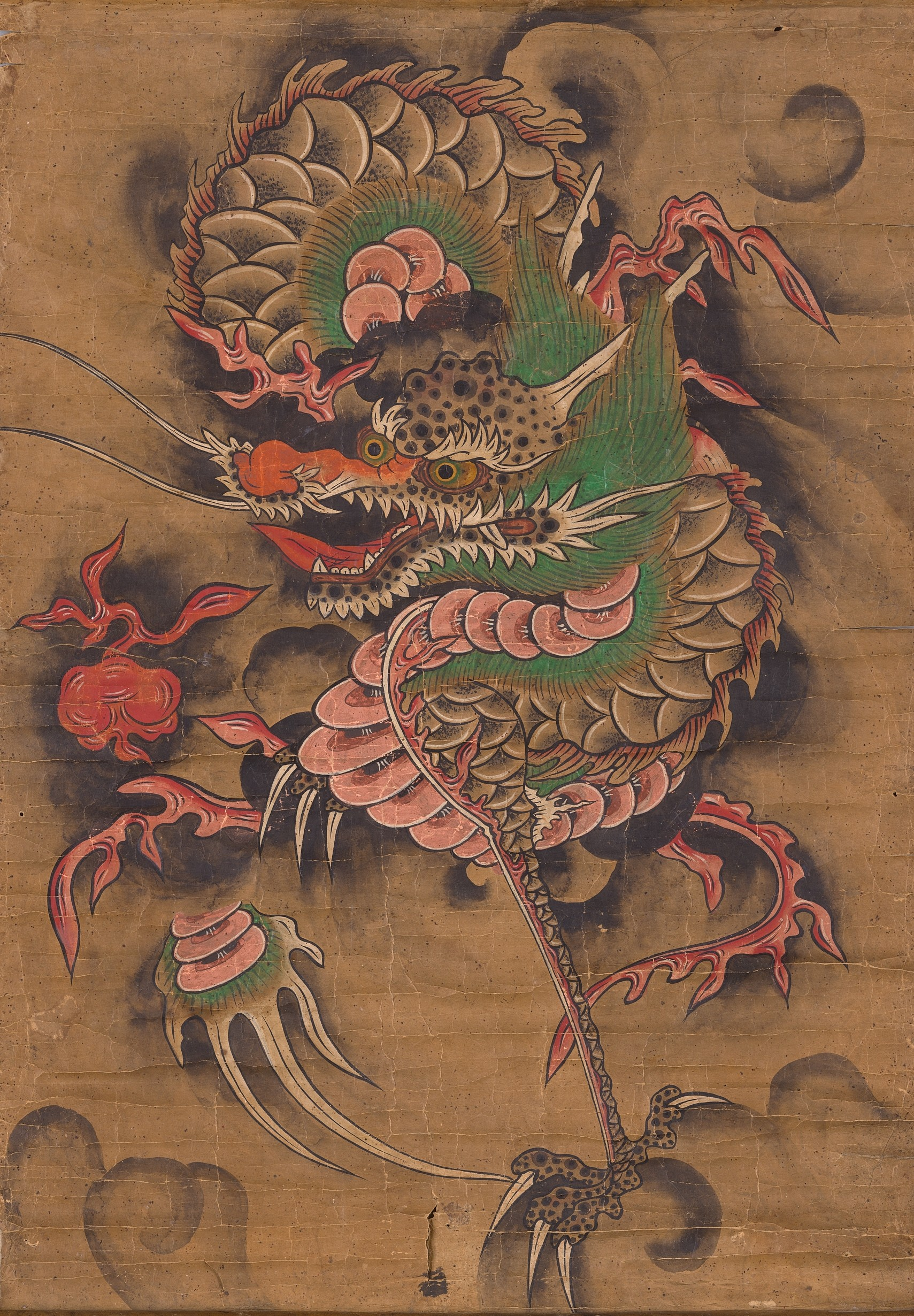
- Ullyongdo (Painting of a Dragon in Clouds), Anonymous, Joseon Dynasty, National Museum of Korea

Korean name
- Hangul: 용/룡; 미르
- Hanja: 龍
- RR: yong/ryong; mireu
- MR: yong/ryong; mirŭ

The Korean dragon (Korean: 용/룡; RR: yong/ryong) is a type of legendary creature in Korean mythology and folkore. It is also called Mir (미르) or Miri (미리) in Korean.

== In Korean mythology and culture ==
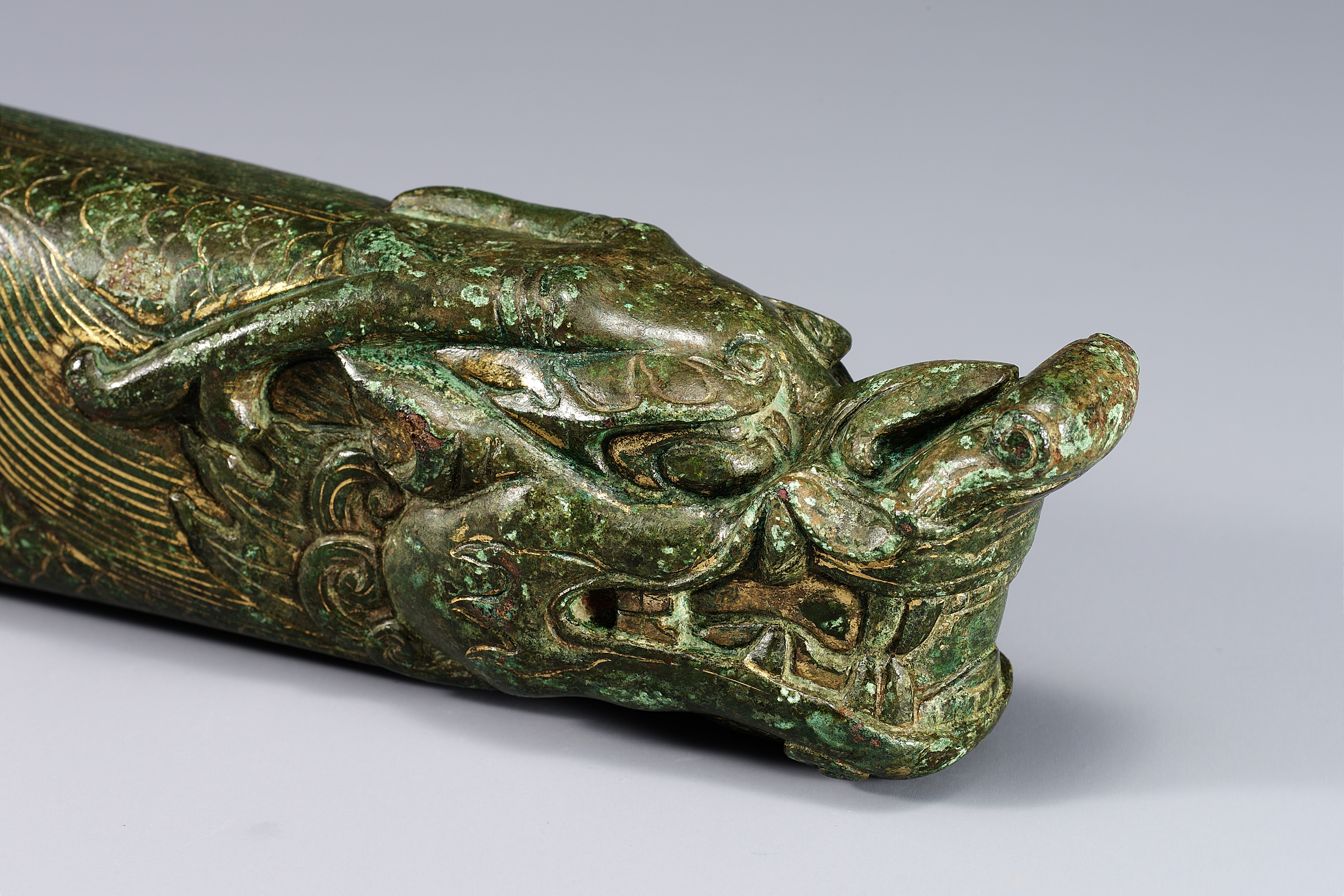
Dragon head ornament, Goryeo dynasty

Whereas most dragons in European mythology are linked to the elements of fire and destruction, dragons in Korean mythology are primarily benevolent beings related to water and agriculture, often considered bringers of rain and clouds. Hence, many Korean dragons are said to have resided in rivers, lakes, oceans, or even deep mountain ponds.

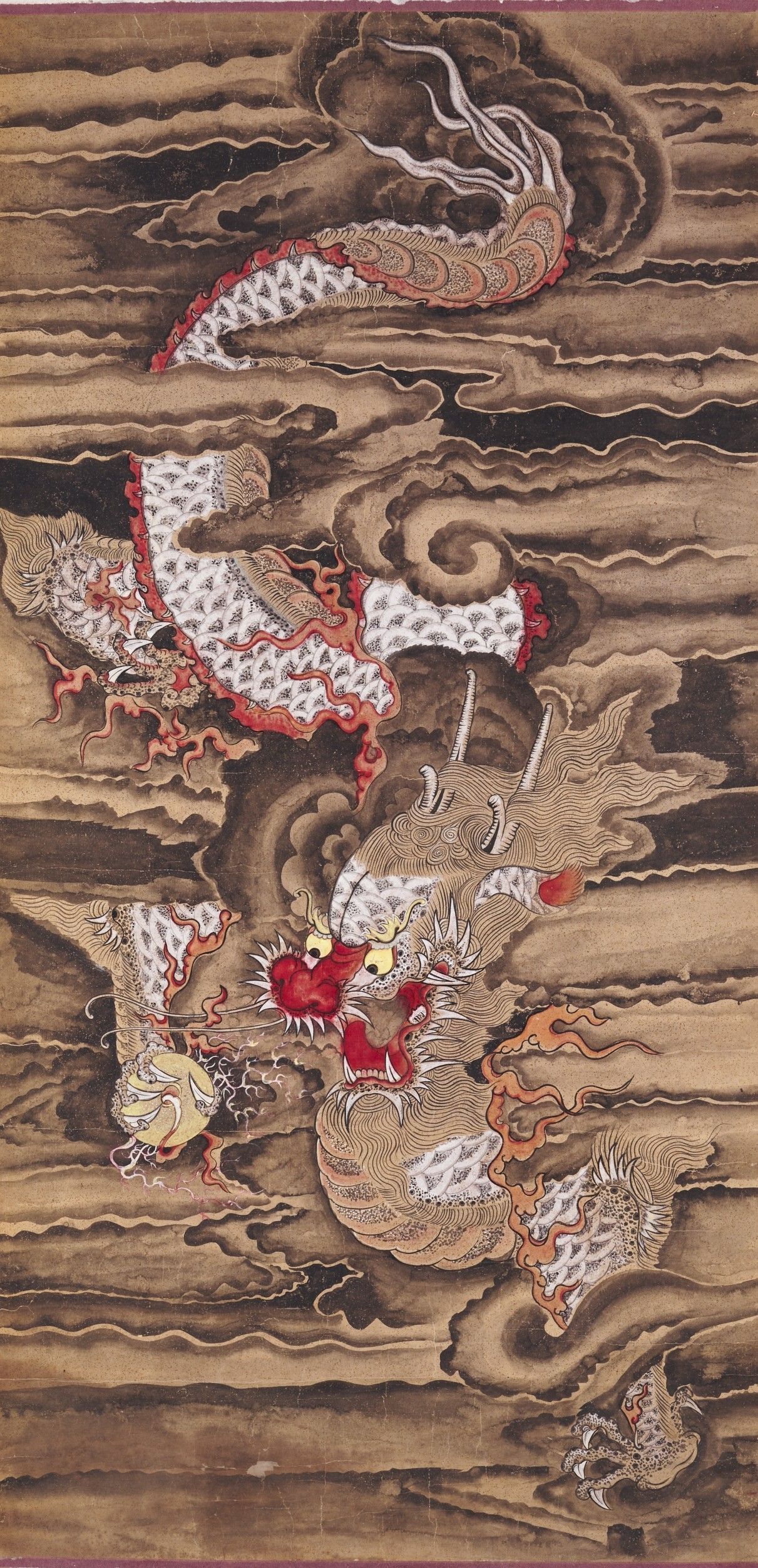
Unryongdo (Painting of a Dragon in Clouds), Joseon Dynasty, National Museum of Korea

The symbol of the dragon has been used extensively in Korean culture, both in Korean mythology and ancient Korean art.

Ancient texts sometimes mention sentient speaking dragons, capable of understanding complex emotions such as devotion, kindness, and gratitude. One particular Korean legend speaks of the great King Munmu, who on his deathbed wished to become a "Great dragon of the East Sea in order to protect his kingdom".

The Korean dragon is in many ways very similar in appearance to other East Asian dragons such as the Chinese and Japanese dragons. It differs from the Chinese dragon in that it developed a longer beard.

As with China, the number nine is significant and auspicious in Korea, and dragons were said to have 81 (9×9) scales on their backs, representing yang essence. Occasionally a dragon may be depicted as carrying a giant orb known as the yeouiju (여의주), the Korean name for the mythical Cintamani, in its claws or its mouth. It was said that whoever could wield the yeouiju was blessed with the abilities of omnipotence and creation at will and that only four-toed dragons (who had thumbs with which to hold the orbs) were both wise and powerful enough to wield these orbs, as opposed to the lesser, three-toed dragons.

== Symbolism ==
In traditional Korean culture, the dragon has been a potent symbol of power, authority, protection, and divine legitimacy. This symbolism transcended mythology to become a crucial emblem of royal and military identity. One prominent example is the gonryongpo, the royal robe worn by kings and crown princes during the Joseon Dynasty. The gonryongpo was intricately embroidered with five dragons, representing the king’s supreme authority over the natural and cosmic order. These dragons symbolized not only power and sovereignty but also the king’s role as a protector and a mediator between heaven and earth. The use of dragon motifs on the gonryongpo reinforced the wearer’s divine right to rule and the sanctity of the monarchy.

=== Military Symbolism ===
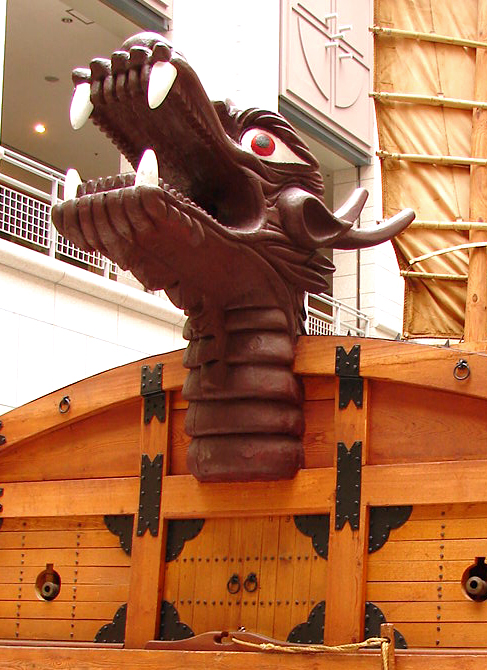
geobukseon Dragon Head in the War Memorial of Korea

In Korean military tradition, dragons have long symbolized power, protection, and divine authority. These attributes were not merely mythological but were actively incorporated into military design and strategy. A prominent example is the geobukseon (turtle ship), a warship developed during the Joseon Dynasty and famously commanded by Admiral Yi Sun-sin. The bow of the ship featured a sculpted dragon head, which served both symbolic and functional purposes. The dragon motif embodied strength and protection, instilling fear in the enemy while boosting morale among the Joseon Navy. Some historical accounts also suggest that the dragon head was designed to emit smoke or sulfur gas, adding a psychological and tactical element to naval warfare. Through this integration of mythical imagery and practical engineering, the dragon became a powerful emblem of Korean martial identity.

== Imugi ==
Korean folk mythology states that most dragons were originally imugis (이무기; Imugi), or lesser dragons, which were said to resemble gigantic serpents. There are a few different versions of Korean folklore that describe both what imugis are and how they aspire to become full-fledged dragons. Koreans thought that an imugi could become a true dragon, or yong or mireu, if it caught a Yeouiju which had fallen from heaven. Another explanation states they are hornless creatures resembling dragons who have been cursed and thus were unable to become dragons. By other accounts, an imugi is a proto-dragon that must survive one thousand years in order to become a fully-fledged dragon. In either case, they are said to be large, benevolent, python-like creatures that live in water or caves, and their sighting is associated with good luck.

The imugi is also called ishimi (이시미), miri (미리), yeongno (영노), gangcheori (강철이), kkwangcheori (꽝철이), kkangcheori (깡철이), bari (바리), hweryong (훼룡; 虺龍), or iryong (이룡; 螭龍).

=== In popular culture ===
- In the 2007 South Korean film D-War, two imugi, one benevolent and the other evil, are seen competing for possession of a source of power called the Yeouiju (여의주), by which one of them could become a dragon. Ultimately, the evil imugi is destroyed by his rival moments after the latter had captured the source. Here, the two are shown to be physically different, in that the evil imugi is darker-colored, more slender and distinguished by an inflexible hood similar to that of a cobra, whereas the good imugi is paler, stockier, hoodless, and more closely resembles a python. Narration in the film implies that many imugi exist at a time, whereof few are designated to become a dragon.
- An imugi is the main antagonist in the 2020 South Korean drama Tale of the Nine-tailed. In the series, the imugi is portrayed as a serpent in human form with the ability to possess humans, infect people with deadly, contagious diseases, and read people's minds. In the past, he unsuccessfully sought to become a dragon spirit. After his failure, he attempted to take over a kingdom but was killed by the mountain spirit Lee Yeon with aid from the kingdom's princess, Ah-eum. Resurrecting in the present day, he seeks revenge on both the spirit and the reincarnation of Ah-eum, Nam Ji-ha.
- The imugi gangcheori takes center stage in the 2025 historic romcom/fantasy Korean drama The Haunted Palace. The story leans heavily on the folk saga tradition about imugis and gangcheori in particular where gangcheori unsuccessfully ascended to heaven due to be seen by a human child as he flies to the heaven. Angry and bitter toward humanity, he takes his revenge by burning the land as he passes through the country. After decades of restless vagabonding he finds a shaman's granddaughter with remarkable skills and schemes to use her to get another chance to ascend to a dragon, but things does not exactly go according to his plans.

== Gangcheori ==
Gangcheori are dragon-shaped monsters that popularly feature in Korean mythology that were introduced in the 17th century. One of the earliest records of Gangcheori being mentioned is the Jibong Yuseol (1614). In those days, there was an old saying, "Where Gangcheori goes is like spring even it is fall." When author Lee Soo-kwang asked an old man in the countryside about the origin of the word, the old man told him about a monster called Gangcheori that burns down everything in a few miles. According to the records in "Seongho saseol" (mid-18th century), Gangcheori is a venomous dragon that like to live in swamps or lakes, and emits a powerful heat that destroys moisture and causes drought. It also brings storms, lightning, and hail to ruin crops.

== Korean cockatrice ==
The Korean cockatrice is known as a gyeryong (계룡; 鷄龍) "chicken-dragon"; they do not appear as often as dragons. They are sometimes seen as chariot-pulling beasts for important legendary figures or the parents of legendary heroes. One such legend involves the founding of the Kingdom of Silla, whose Lady Aryeong was said to have been born from a cockatrice egg. It is also the origin of the name for the city of Gyeryong in South Chungcheong Province.

== Gallery ==
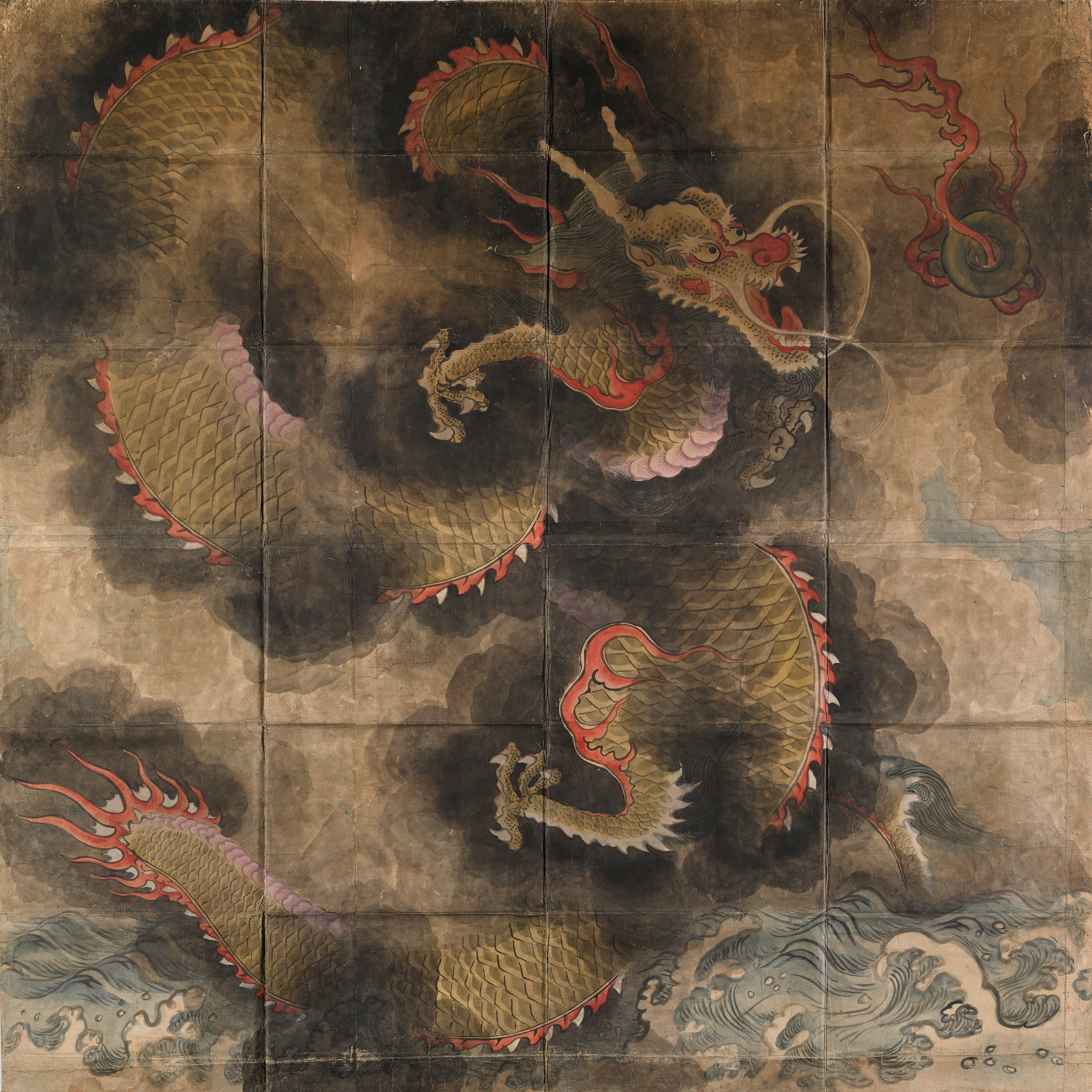
Cheongryongdo (Painting of a Blue Dragon), National Museum of Korea

Rafter finial in the shape of a dragon’s head and wind chime, Metropolitan Museum of Art

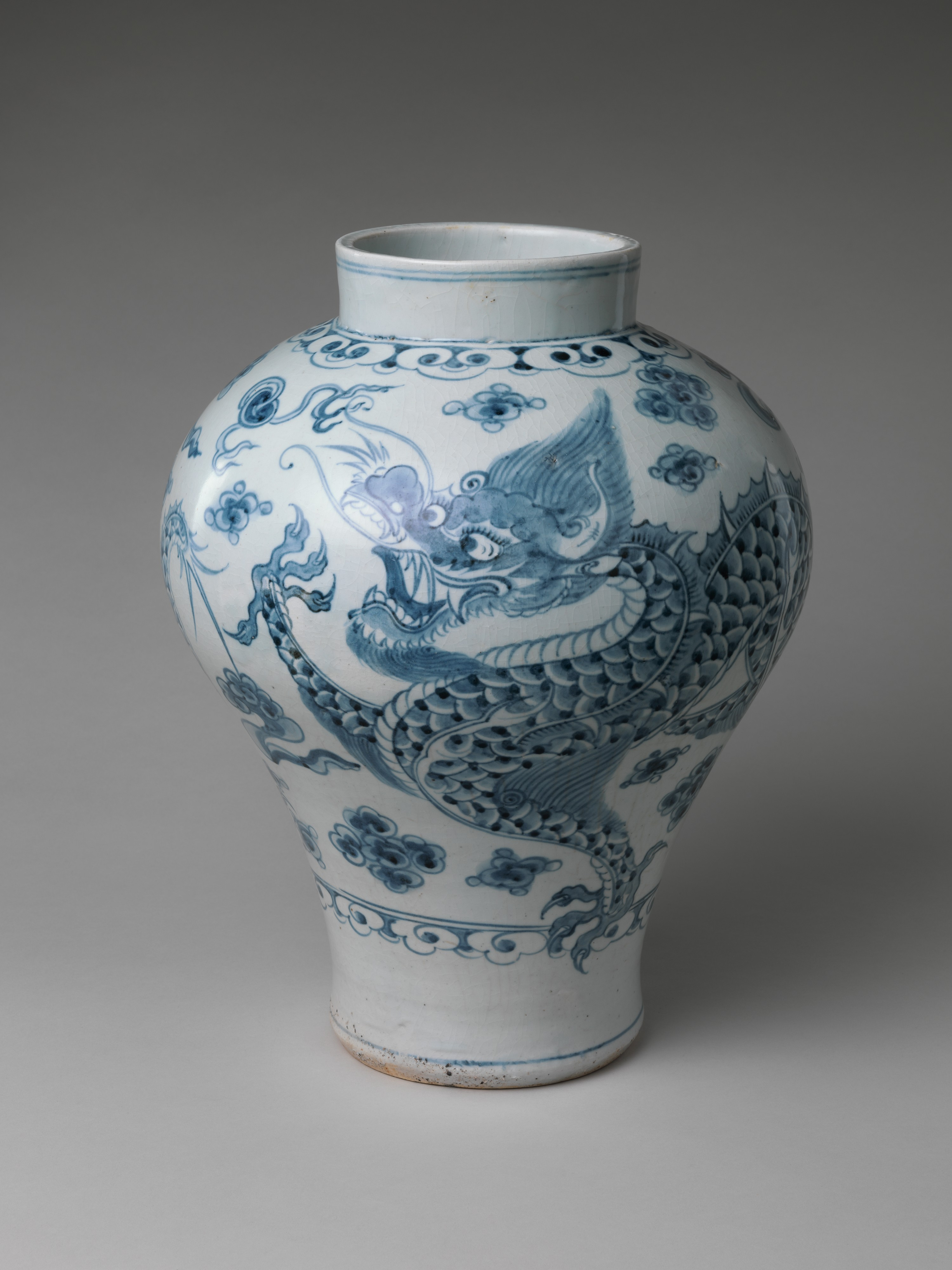
White Porcelain Jar with yong in Underglaze Cobalt Blue, Joseon, Metropolitan Museum of Art

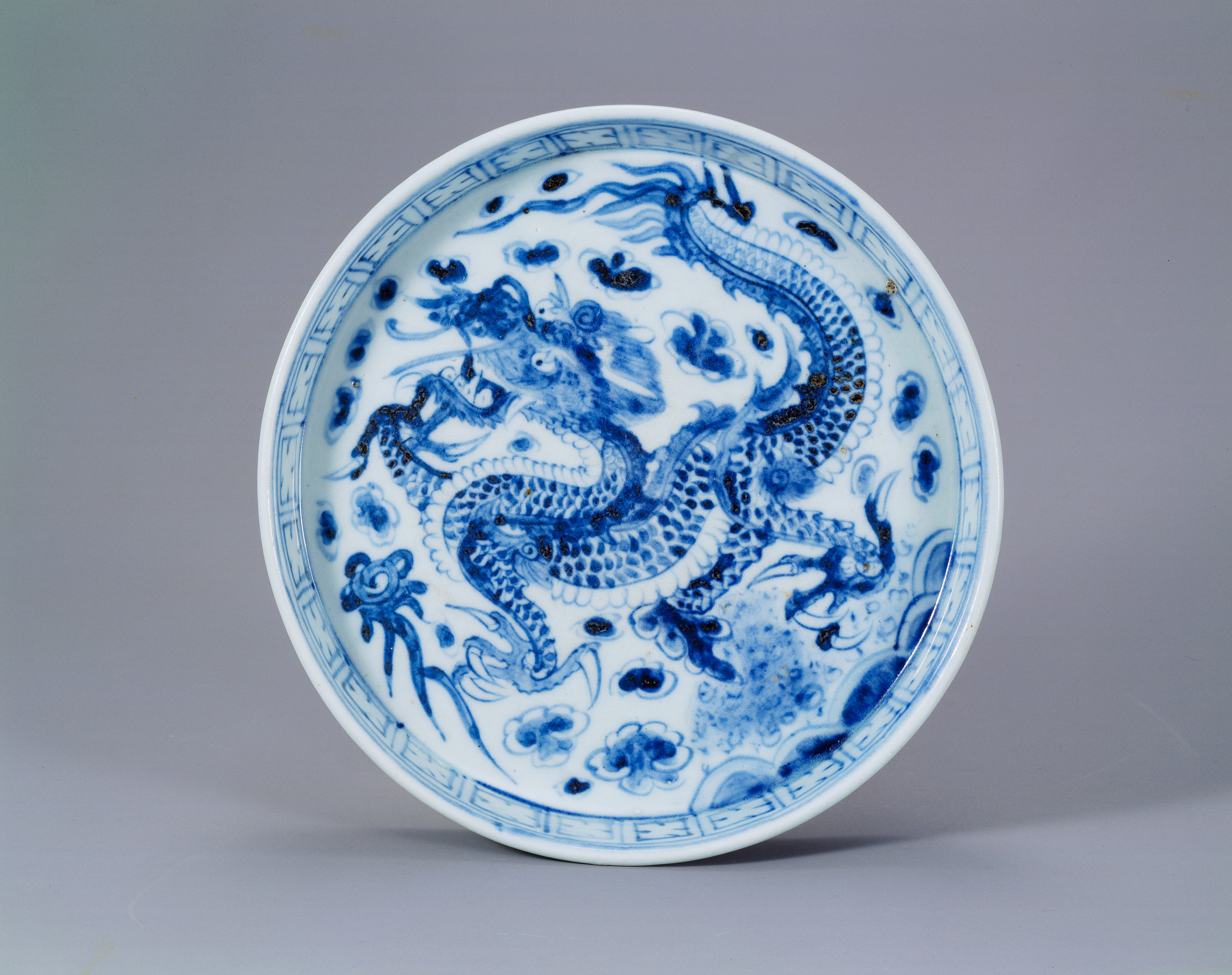
White Porcelain Plate with Blue-and-White Dragon among Clouds, Joseon Dynasty, National Museum of Korea

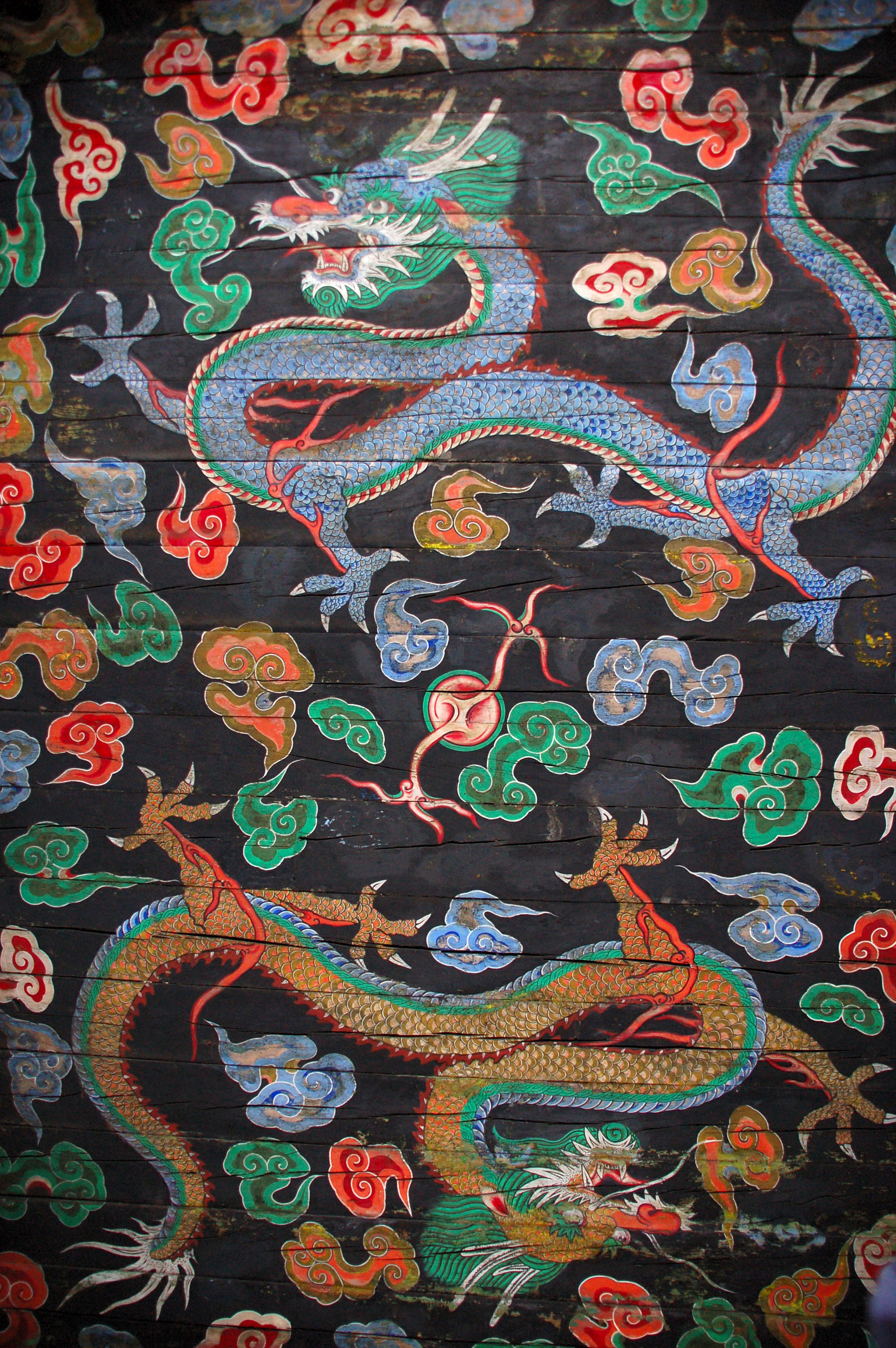
Depictions of the Cheongryong (청룡) and Yellow Dragon(황룡) on Namdaemun

Azure Dragon of the mural of the Goguryeo tomb

Azure Dragon in Hanbyeongnu Pavilion

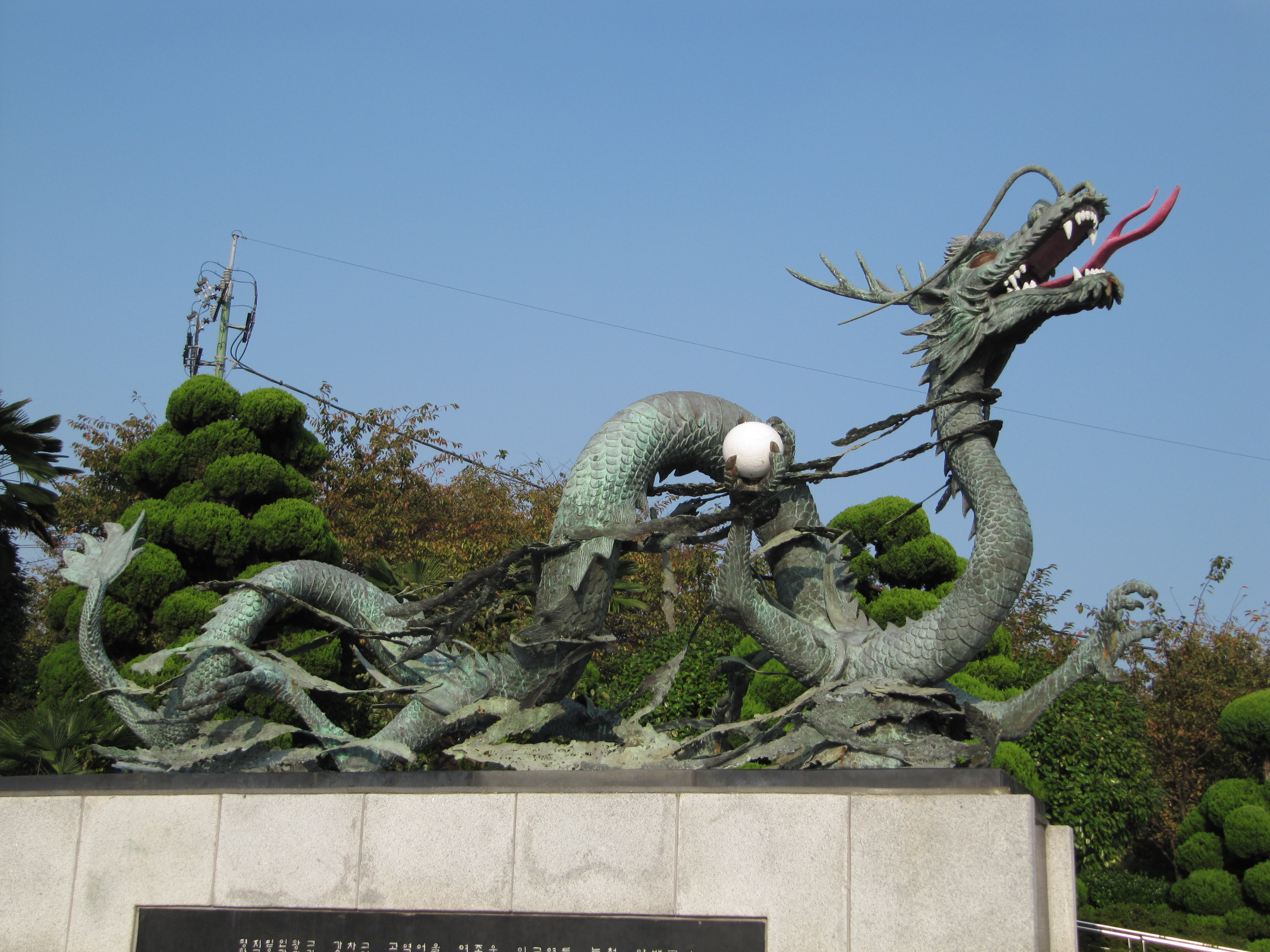
Yong Pagoda in Yongdusan Park

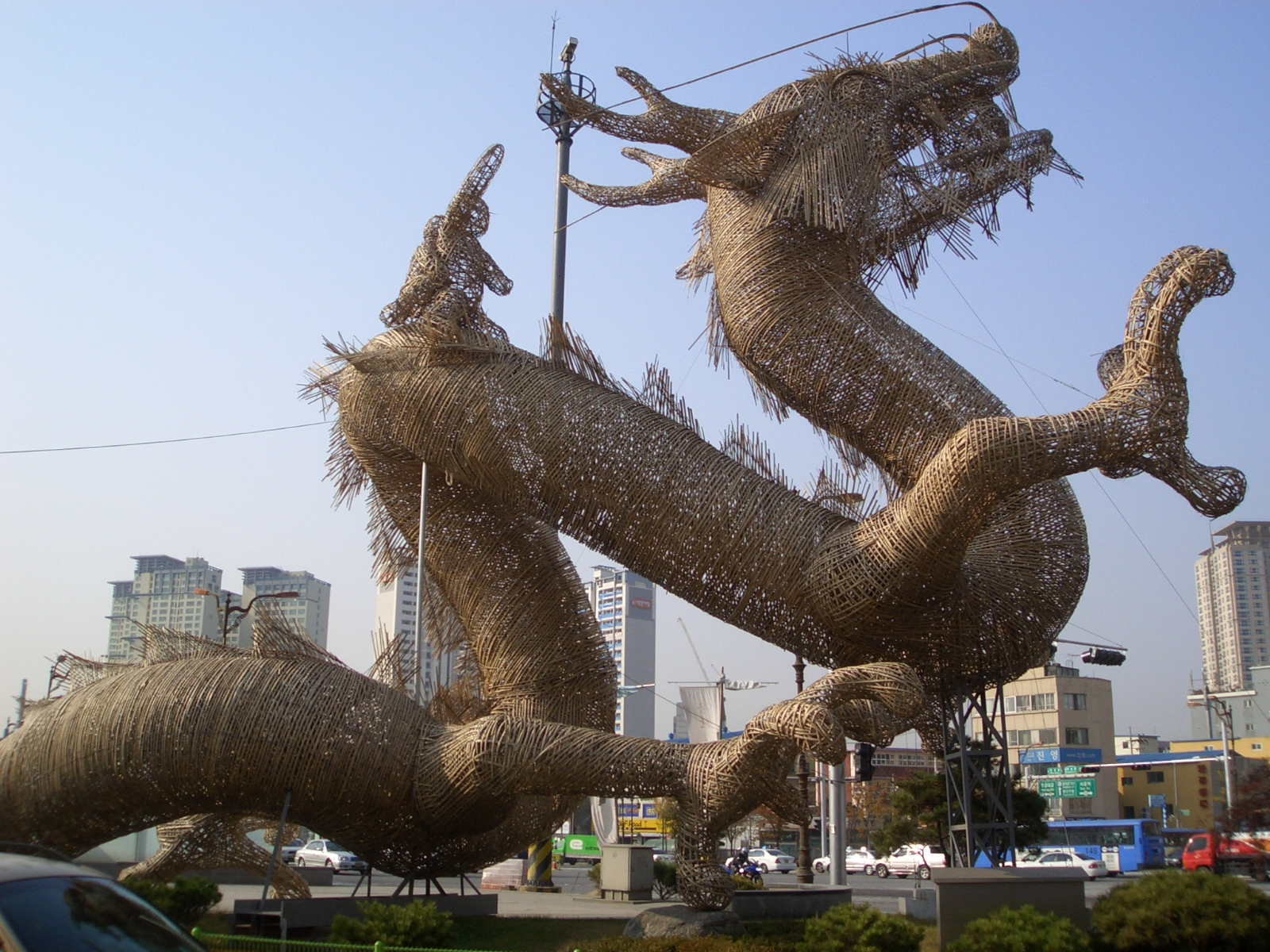
Dragon made out of bamboo on display by Hangang-no near Samgakji subway station, Yongsan-gu, Seoul, to celebrate Yongsan-gu's 124th anniversary.

== Related legendary creatures ==
- Chinese dragon
- Druk, the Thunder Dragon of Bhutanese mythology
- Japanese dragon
- Nāga, a Hindu and Buddhist creature in South Asian and Southeast Asian mythology.
  - Bakunawa, a moon-eating sea dragon depicted in Philippine mythology
- Vietnamese dragon

== See also ==
- An Instinct for Dragons, hypothesis about the origin of dragon myths.
- European dragons
- Korean folklore
- Korean mythology
- List of dragons in mythology and folklore
- Long Mu, a woman who was deified as a goddess after raising dragons
- Radical 212, the dragon radical in Chinese characters, also used in traditional Korean writing and in studies of Korean etymology
