= Violet Lake =

Lake in Hawaii

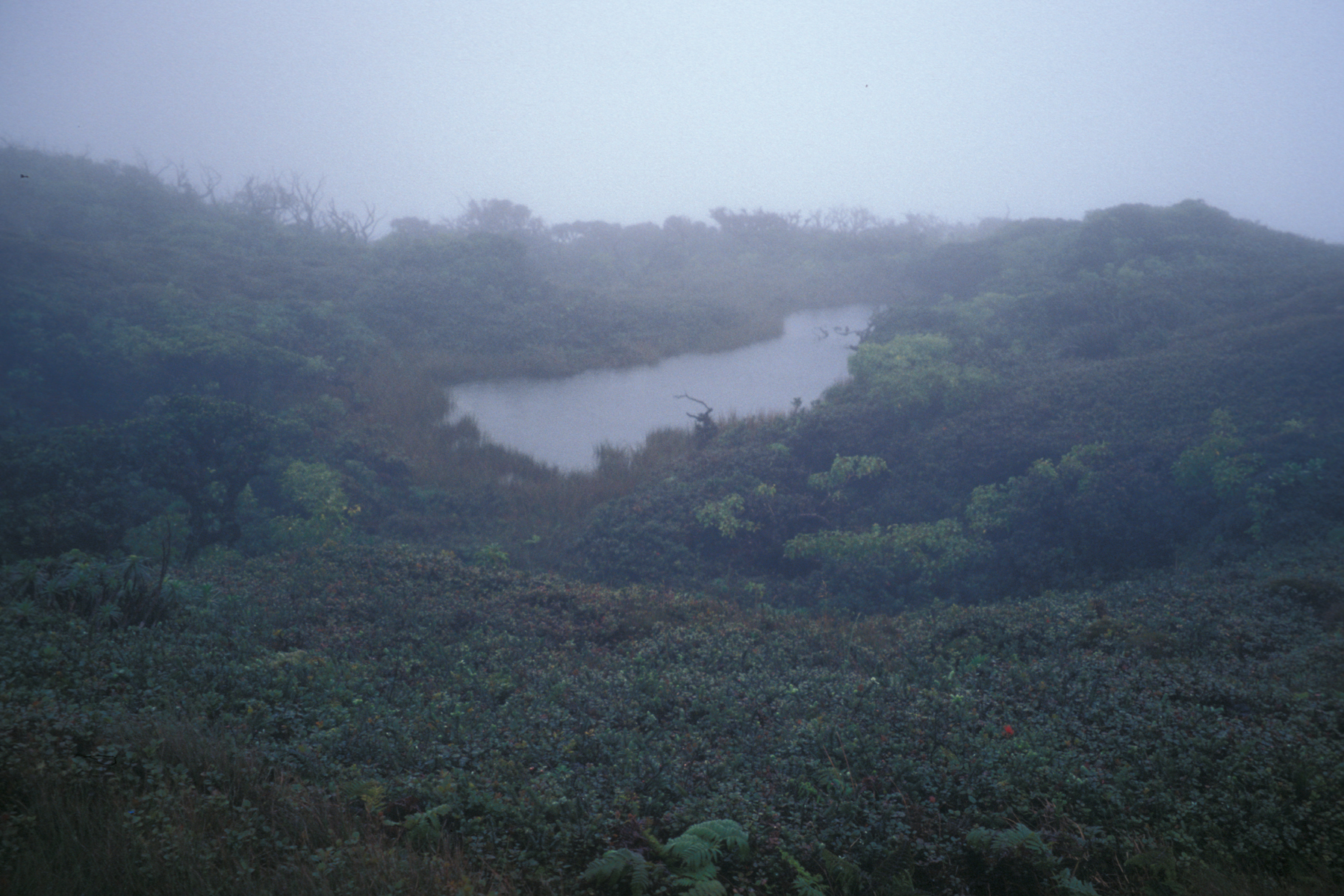
- Violet Lake situated in a forest of ʻōhiʻa lehua trees (Metrosideros polymorpha)

- Location within Hawaii Location within Pacific Ocean
- Location: West Maui Mountains, Maui
- Coordinates: 20.907471°N 156.594779°W
- Basin countries: United States
- Surface area: 10 ft × 20 ft (3.0 m × 6.1 m) (approximate)
- Surface elevation: 5,020 ft (1,530 m) (approximate)

Violet Lake (Hawaiian: Kiʻowaiokihawahine), is a small high-elevation lake located at 5,020 ft (1,530 m) above sea level on Mauna Kahalawai (the West Maui Mountains), situated in the western part of the island of Maui. It is located in the boggy slopes near the ʻEke Crater and Puʻu Kukui, the highest peak of the West Maui Mountains. It is approximately 10 ft × 20 ft (3.0 m × 6.1 m) in size.

The lake's English name derive from the reflected color of the lake's surface and also the Maui violet (Viola mauiensis) which grows on its banks. The Hawaiian language name Kiʻowaiokihawahine means the "pond of Kihawahine".

The lake was important to the traditional Hawaiian religion. During ancient times, the lake and surrounding summit area was protected by kapu and regarded as the meeting place of heaven and earth. The lake was believed to be the home of the Hawaiian moʻo (lizard) goddess Kihawahine, who was associated with the aliʻi nui (high chiefs or kings) of Maui and an ʻaumakua (family deity) of Queen Keōpūolani, a descendant of the Maui royal line and the highest-ranking wife of King Kamehameha I, who established the Hawaiian Kingdom. Kihawahine was also associated with the wetland and former royal complex at Mokuʻula located in the watersheds below the lake in Lahaina.

The surrounding montane rainforest ecosystem on the slopes of Puʻu Kukui Watershed Management Area (the second wettest spot in the Hawaiian Islands) is extremely diverse and home to many endemic species. The lake's own unique ecosystem has not been well studied. Species include the dwarfed ʻōhiʻa lehua tree (Metrosideros polymorpha), the Maui violet (Viola mauiensis), a variety of Hawaiian lobelioids (Lobelia gloriamontis), the Hawaiian damsel flies (Megalagrion spp.), and others. It has been described as an "extremely rare gem" which have "residents and visiting scientists alike".

== See also ==
- List of lakes in Hawaii
