= Hatuibwari =

Dragon of Solomon Islands

The Hatuibwari otherwise known as Agunua was a dragon in the Solomon Islands in Melanesia. It has the head of a human, four eyes, clawed arms, bat wings, and the body of a serpent. The ancient belief is that he created and nourished all living things; that he is the male version of Mother Earth. This legend comes from Makira (formerly San Cristobal) in Melanesia.

It is mentioned in the book Dragons, Fearsome Monsters from Myth and Fiction by Scholastic, general editor Gerrie McCall.
