= Ilomba =

Origin
- Country: Zambia

Ilomba is a sea snake with destructive powers in the mythology of the Lozi people of Zambia. It is created by a witch doctor. It is made with their finger nails and blood from their forehead, back, and chest. They mix it in a pan with herbs that were considered to have a magical force. It is usually fed with eggs and porridge when it is young because its fangs are not fully developed. It takes on the identity of the person that owns it. The owner will command it to kill a person. The victim will see the witch doctor's face in place of the Ilomba's, but the other people will view it as a normal snake. It bites into its prey then consumes its soul. If it is killed, the owner feels the pain, and then dies. If the owner dies, it dies. If the witch doctor stops supplying food to it, it will turn on its master and consume them. The only way it can be destroyed is through the witch doctor. When the witch doctor does kill it, they will be constantly haunted by the souls that the Ilomba consumed.
