= Moʻo =

Lizard spirits in Hawaiian mythology

Moʻo are shapeshifting reptilian spirits in Hawaiian mythology.

== Description ==
Moʻo often take the forms of monstrous reptiles, tiny geckos, and/or humans. They were revered as ʻaumakua, and could have power over the weather and water. They were amphibious, and many fishponds in Hawaii were believed to be home to a moʻo. When a moʻo dies, its petrified body becomes part of the landscape. Most of the time the Mo’o were found to be females.

== Legends ==
One of the legends about Moʻo is that Pele is the volcano goddess who sends her little sister, Hiʻiaka, to rescue a mortal lover. “As Hiʻiaka travels island to island, she encounters many moʻo. On the windward cliffs of Molokaʻi, the young goddess and her attendant Wahineʻomaʻo come to an impassable ravine. As they ponder how to proceed, a slender plank appears. Wahineʻomaʻo starts across, but Hiʻiaka recognizes the bewitched bridge for what it is: the tongue of the man-eating moʻo Kikipua. Spanning the gorge with her magical paʻu (skirt), Hiʻiaka chases the lizard to its lair and kills it”. Another story is that Moʻo has also been known to have possessed powers. It has been said they can control or manipulate the weather.

Another story about Moʻo is “To this day, fishermen hoping to catch hinalea (wrasse) in Waialua, Oʻahu, call upon the spirit of Kalamainuʻu. This moʻo, according to storytellers, fell in love with a young chief while surfing. After she married him, her cousins Hinalea and Aikilolo disclosed her true identity, then turned into fish and disappeared down a crack in the seafloor. Kalamainuʻu cleverly snared her betrayers with a woven trap — and she’ll supposedly fill the fish traps of those who ask”.

The story that this shares about the Moʻo is “One of the most famous legends about Moʻo is the story of Hina, the goddess of the moon, and her battle with the Moʻo Kuna. According to the legend, Hina was pursued by the Moʻo Kuna, a giant serpent that threatened to consume her. In order to escape, Hina transformed herself into a rock and waited for the Moʻo Kuna to pass by. Once the serpent had passed, Hina emerged from the rock and used her magical powers to turn the Moʻo Kuna into stone”.

Other stories were told as or remembered as guardians or even these feared predators but regardless they continue to be all imaginary. Some think that they are dragon-like beasts who go to war with indigenous Hawaiians and even the goddess of volcanoes, Pele. When a Moʻo dies, the petrified body becomes a part of the landscaping; examples are that the rocks are known to be the remains of the Moʻo Water guardians. There are some nearby Hawaiian volcanoes that are known to have rested there to protect the park for eternity.

== In popular culture ==
The Pokémon evolutionary line Jangmo-o, Hakamo-o, and Kommo-o, as well as Salandit and Salazzle, introduced in the Hawaii-inspired Alola region, may be based on the Mo'o.

== List of Moʻo ==
- Hauwahine: The Moʻo guardian of Kawainui.
- Kalamainuʻu: A Moʻo associated with wrasse fishing.
- Kapulei: A male Moʻo whose body is said to lie on Kamalō Ridge.
- Kihawahine: A Moʻo believed to inhabit Mokuhinia and Violet Lake.
- Mamala: A Moʻo known for her skill in surfing.

Several named moʻo were defeated by Hiʻiaka
