= An Instinct for Dragons =

2000 book by David E. Jones

- Cover of the first edition
- Author: David E. Jones
- Language: English
- Publisher: Routledge
- Publication date: 2000
- ISBN: 978-0-415-92721-5

An Instinct for Dragons is a book by University of Central Florida anthropologist David E. Jones, in which he seeks to explain the universality of dragon images in the folklore of human societies. In the introduction, Jones conducts a survey of dragon myths from cultures around the world and argues that certain aspects of dragons or dragon-like mythical creatures are found very widely. He claims that even the Inuit have a reptilian dragon-like monster, even though (living in a frigid environment unsuited for cold-blooded animals) they had never seen an actual reptile.

Jones then argues against the common hypothesis that dragon myths might be motivated by primitive discoveries of dinosaur fossils (he argues that there are widespread traits of dragons in folklore which are not observable from fossils), and claims that the common traits of dragons seem to be an amalgam of the principal predators of our ancestral hominids, which he names as the raptors, great cats (especially leopards) and pythons.

The hypothesis to which Jones conforms is that over millions of years of evolution, members of a species will evolve an instinctive fear of their predators, and he proposes ways in which these fearful images may be merged in artistic or cultural expression to create the dragon image and, perhaps, other kinds of hybrid monster.

Finally he suggests sociological reasons for why such images may be perceived differently at different stages of a culture to try to explain why Chinese dragons are considered basically good and representative of government, but the great majority (although not all) European dragons are evil and often represent chaos.

== Reception ==
Jones' theory was opposed in an article by Paul Jordan-Smith in the Spring 2002 issue of Western Folklore and by other authors. Jordan-Smith criticized the lack of evidence given to prove why dragon myths could not have been passed from culture to culture. He also notes that it cannot be demonstrated that the fears of ancestral hominids are coded into the human brain. He concludes his review by writing "One is tempted to say, as Dorothy Parker once did, that this is a book not to be tossed aside lightly but thrown violently. But no, it is not worth spending even that much energy on."

D. Ogden writes that Jones' ideas "might offer pause for thought given the universality of dragon-slaying narratives". He adds, though, that the compound cat, snake, raptor creature imagined by Jones is mostly the Western stereotype based on mediaeval imagery, and that Jones has sought out similar images in a way that lacks rigor. In particular, Ogden notes that the dragons of Graeco-Roman myth do not fit with Jones's prototype, typically lacking one or more of the hybrid components (with the exception of Typhon, who, however, combines many more animals than Jones's three).

The book's hypothesis has similarities to that in Carl Sagan's 1977 The Dragons of Eden, though puts more emphasis on hybridity beyond the reptile.
