= Sárkány (mythology) =

Monster in Hungarian folk tales

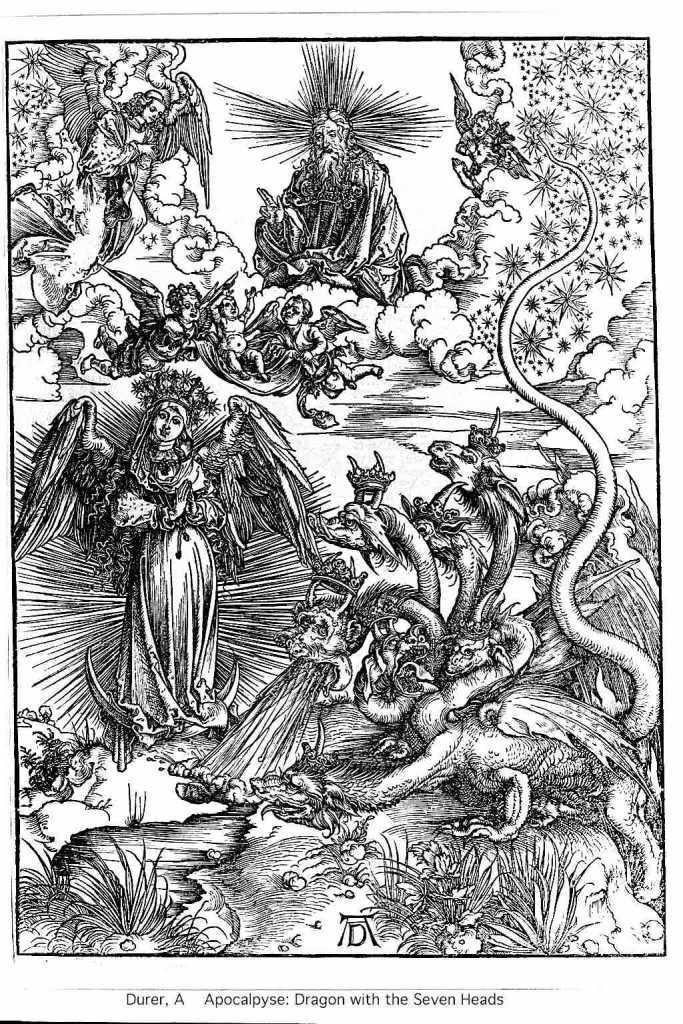
″Hétfejű sárkány″ (The Dragon with the Seven Heads)

A sárkány (SHAR-kahnyuh, 'dragon') is a legendary monster found in Hungarian mythology. It usually appears as a scaly, winged, reptilian beast, but in some cases it could be a mixture of other beings.

== Etymology ==
Hungarian sárkány is regarded as a loanword from Oghuric Turkic (or "West Old Turkic" (Note: Golden: "Oḡuric (or 'Western Old Turkic' as Rona-Tas terms it)")) šaragan 'dragon' (Note: Reconstructed form WOT (Western Old Turkic) *šarkan<*šar + XrkA - n given by Árpád.) (Note: Etymology attributed to Karl Heinrich Menges (1979) as tentative connection being made in his Russian literature study.) The term sazaġan "dragon" is given as a Common Turkic cognate by one authority, but this is considered a medieval (Middle Turkic) form of a different etymology (Note: sazaġan <saz + A - gAn.) according to another. (Note: And thus unattested in modern Common Turkic according to Árpád, who reconstructs the would-be modern forms as *sarïrkan or *sazïrkan.)

The word may be connected to the same root as occurs in Hungarian sárga ('yellow'), which is also probably a corrupted loanword from WOT/Oghuric. The tribal name Shari (Šarı) is connected to this root meaning 'yellow'; so is the Chuvash cognate šurǎ/šorǎ (meaning 'white'). Whether these can be tied to the Russian name "Polovtsian" (meaning 'pale') for the Cuman nomads is a debated issue.

A Cuman-Qipčaq (Polovtsian) chieftain Sharukan (Šarukan) of the 11th/12th century, whose name meant "dragon" was an adversary of the Rus', and has entered Russian epic The Tale of Igor's Campaign. A memory of this is possibly preserved in the epic song (bylina) recounting the combat between the hero Duke Stepanovich and the šarkan. (Note: Rybnikov ed. apud Polívka (1922)) (Note: Cf. also "215. Gusinko Plenkovich -vstrechayetsya s Sharkom-velikanom" Гусинко Пленковичъ -встречается съ Шаркомъ-великаномъ [Gusinko Plenkovich Encounters Sharkan the Giant].)

While occurrence in Russian literature as given above is rather isolated, the term šarkan or šarkaň in the sense of "dragon" certainly occurs in the Slovak language and known in some parts of Czechia. (Note: Listed in Bartoš's dictionary, collected in Uherský Brod, Czechia according to Polívka (1922), p. 269.) The cognate term in Polish, szargan, has also been used in the sense of "dragon".

== Early appearances ==
Dragons were part of Hungarian culture prior to the 18th century. According to their oldest, universal function, dragons symbolized the unity of the material and spiritual worlds. They were later associated with natural phenomena. They either made or appeased the violent forces of nature. They brought rainstorms and tornados. The rumble of the thunder was the roaring of dragons battling above the clouds, striking the clouds with their tails with crash in the heat of the fight and, as a consequence, causing floods of rain pouring over the Hungarian fields.

== Characteristics ==
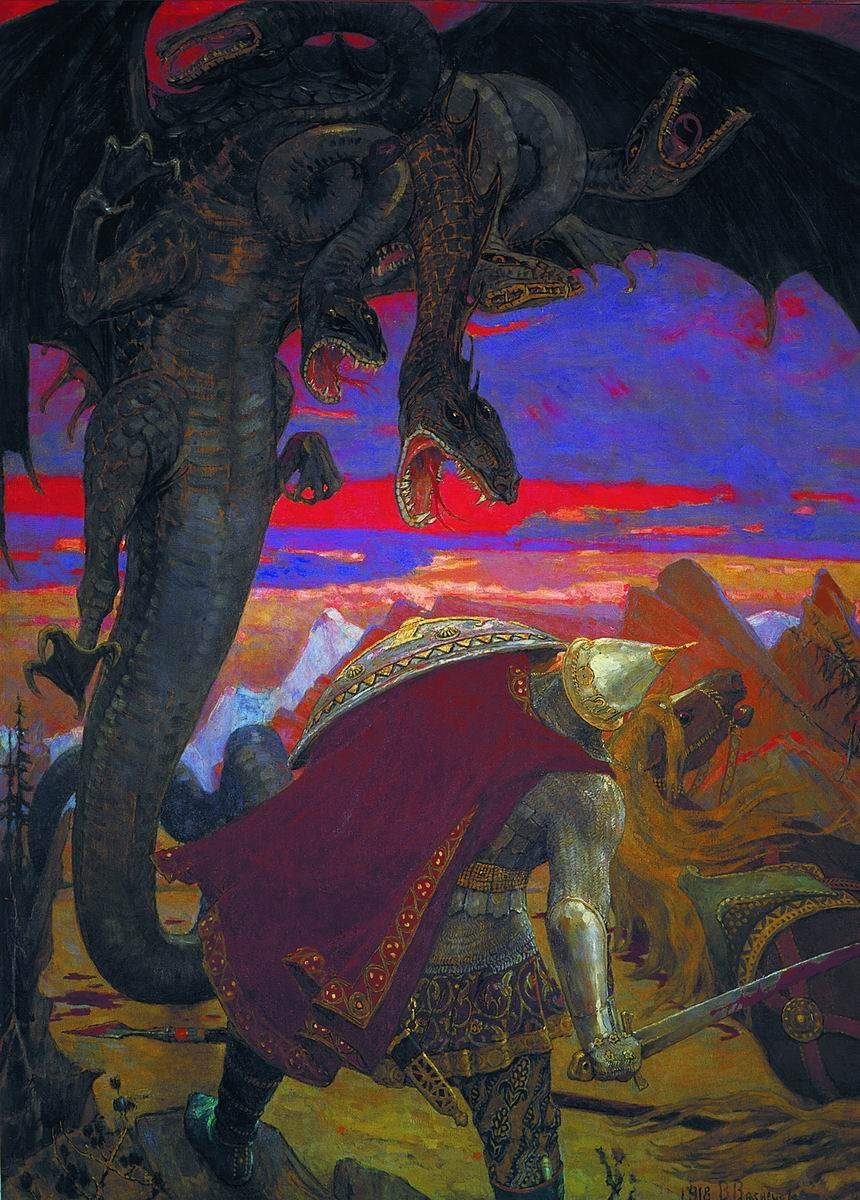
A Sárkány with numerous heads

Though legends offer scant information about the characteristics of the ancient dragons, in some regions it was an accepted that they were born through a transformational process of another being. In the region of Csallóköz, for example, it was thought that the sárkány began life as a pike fish (or rooster, until it attained 7 or 13-years of age) before it grew into a dragon. According to myth, the pike would lie dormant in the mud for several months/years (or the rooster lies hidden in its roost for some years) before transforming. As a dragon, it can be only lured out by the so-called Garabonciás, a human with magical qualities, who later uses the beast as a mount.

In other regions, the belief was that dragons can be born from other dragon. The female, after being pregnant for seven years, suckles her son for another seven years. Dragons usually appear in two forms: the first is the rideable, tyrant mount of the Garabonciás, and the other is the serpent-like creature with several fins, long claws and teeth. Their scales can vary between all the colours of the rainbow, and they are so strong that almost no weapon can hurt their skin. They usually live inside hollow trunks, dens, or in the abandoned caves in the mountains.

== Dragons in Hungarian literature ==
In earlier tales, dragon had no treasure-hoarding characteristics. Later, they became hoarders of gold and gems. This version of the dragon slithered onto the pages of children's literature of the 19th and early 20th centuries, where they appeared often. they generally appeared as aggressive beasts of prey.

In these stories, they are always the villain, whose role is setting the story in motion. They abduct humans, young maidens, especially, and disturb the peaceful village and its inhabitants. The role of the hero is simple: by defeating the creature, he not only save the princess, but gains reputation and prestige.

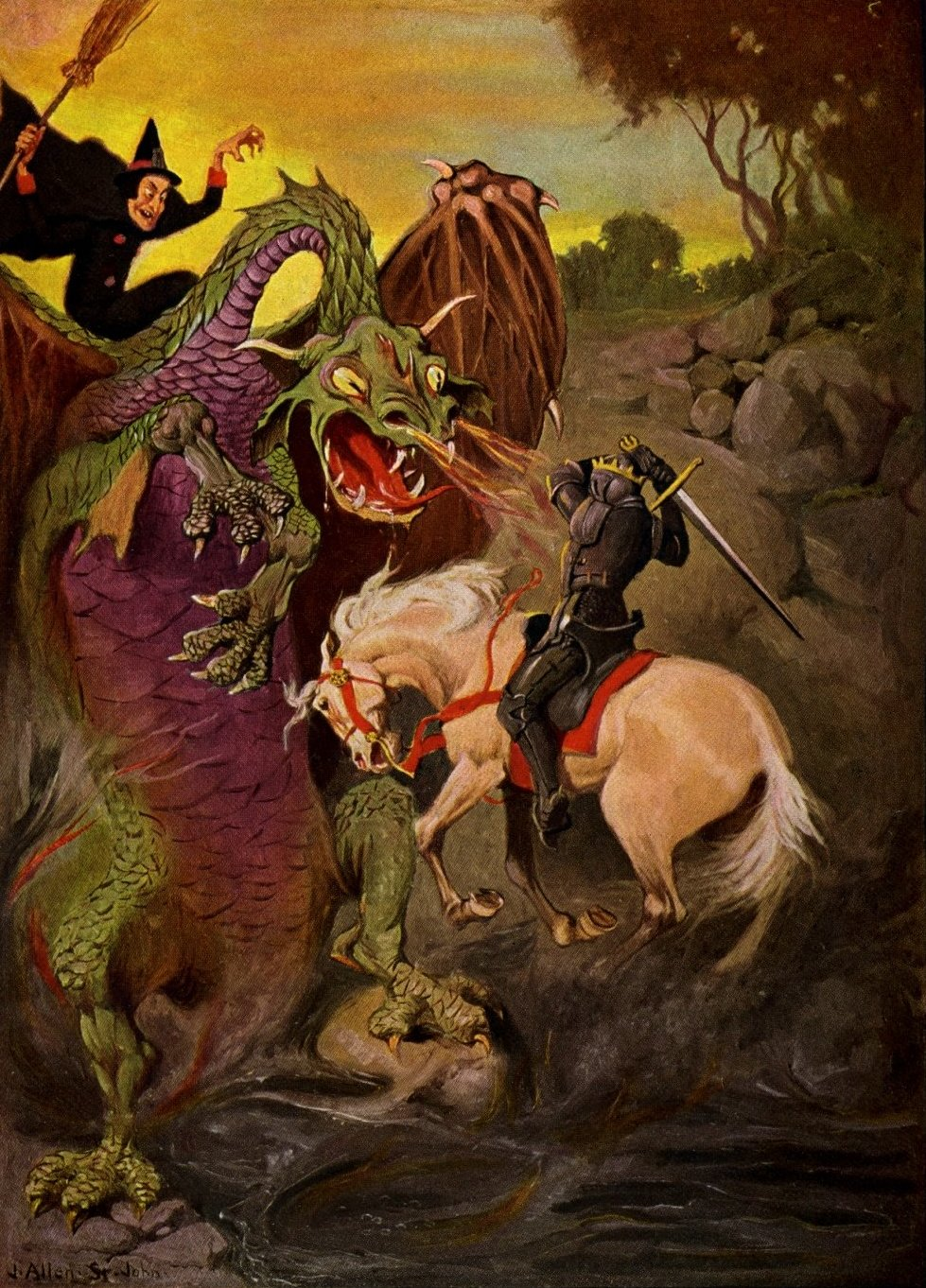
A fight with the Sárkány

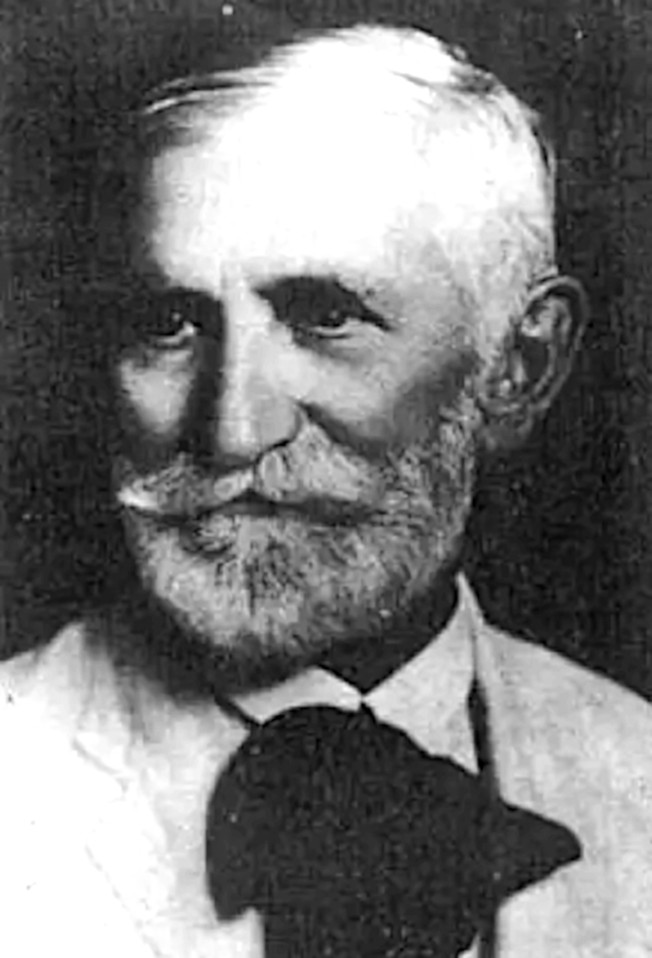
Benedek Elek c.1920

Dragons are usually antrophomorphic, aggressive beings, who have human-like characteristics. Their seven faces (being multiheaded) bear humanlike features, and they are capable of human speech. Although they are the villains of the stories, they frequently sing and dance, nor do they say no to wine.

These iconic images have been exploited by stories written by some of the best-known Hungarian authors, such as Elek Benedek, Gyula Illyés and Arnold Ipolyi. In the János Diák, the dragon "sniffles with its nose", or in the Hajnal ("Dawn"), it is mentioned that dragons live in "Dragonland" (Sárkányország), where the hero needs to travel in order to save the kidnapped maiden. In Gyula Illyés's storybook, Hetvenhét Magyar Népmese (Seventy-seven Hungarian Folktales), the talking and cunning dragons are usually killed by a young, courageous boy, who symbolically steps into adulthood as he kills the beast. In these tales dragons can have many heads, often a multiples of three or seven (six, nine, twelve or twenty-four), numbers which indicates that importance of numerology in Hungarian folklore.

As the 20th century came to a close, another version of dragons has transpired in postmodern Hungarian literature: the image of the violent beast transformed into a wise and emotional being. Ervin Lázár's Hétfejű Tündér introduces the readers a tale of a boy, whose sickness can only be cured by killing the seven-headed dragon. When the boy realizes what an outstanding and beautiful being the dragon is, he cannot perform the task. Besides, perhaps the most well-known instance for the image of the new Hungarian dragon is Süsü, created by István Csukás, who was a prominent figure in the lives of Hungarian children. Not only is he a sensitive character, but also an exceptional dragon among his own kind as he has only one head, which leads him to his outcast status. Csukás focused on the sensitive, emotional representation of the dragon, where the children effortlessly can identify with the magical beast.

From a psychological point of view, the delicate beast in the fairy tales helps the children facing their inner "monsters", where the dragon offers a solution, or a help for the bigger, scarier problems that the child has to face with in the foreseeable future.

== See also ==
- Balaur and Solomonari (≈Garabonciás) - Transylvanian equivalents
- Ala or hala - weather demon or dragon of South Slavic lore
