= Kalamainuʻu =

Hawaiian lizard goddess

- Lizard goddess
- Other names: Kalanimainuʻu
- Venerated in: Hawaiian religion
- Animals: Lizard
- Gender: Female
- Consort: Puna-ai-koaʻe

In Hawaiian mythology, Kalamainu'u (alternate spelling Kalanimainu'u) was a lizard goddess.

== Myths ==
She is said to have lured her lover Puna-ai-koa'e to her cave where she kept him prisoner. When he longed to go surfing again, Kalamainu'u gave him her surfboard, but warned him not to speak with anyone. He, however, spoke with two men: Hinale and Aikilolo (or Hinalea and ʻAkilolo) who revealed to him his lover's true nature. He returned to her cave, saw her in her true form, but showed no fear. Kalamainu'u then attempted to slay his informants, but they turned into wrasse and escaped into cracks in the seafloor. To capture them, she learned to set a hina'i hinalea fishing basket (Craig 1989:95, 218, Beckwith 1940:193, 200).
