= Mokuʻula =

Historic site in Hawaii, United States

- King Kamehameha III's Royal Residential Complex
- U.S. National Register of Historic Places
- Hawaiʻi Register of Historic Places
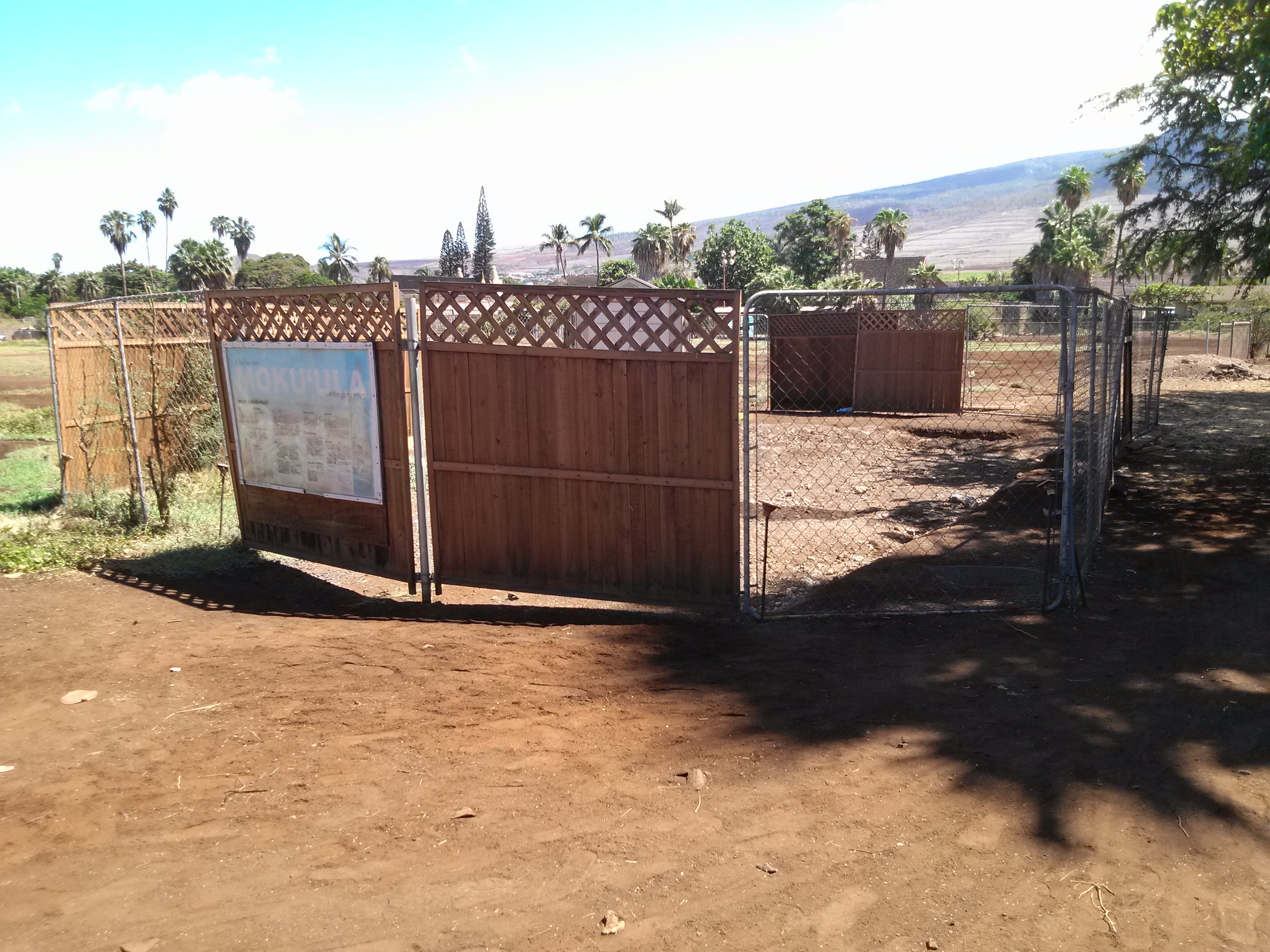
- Archeological site at Mokuʻula, September 2012.

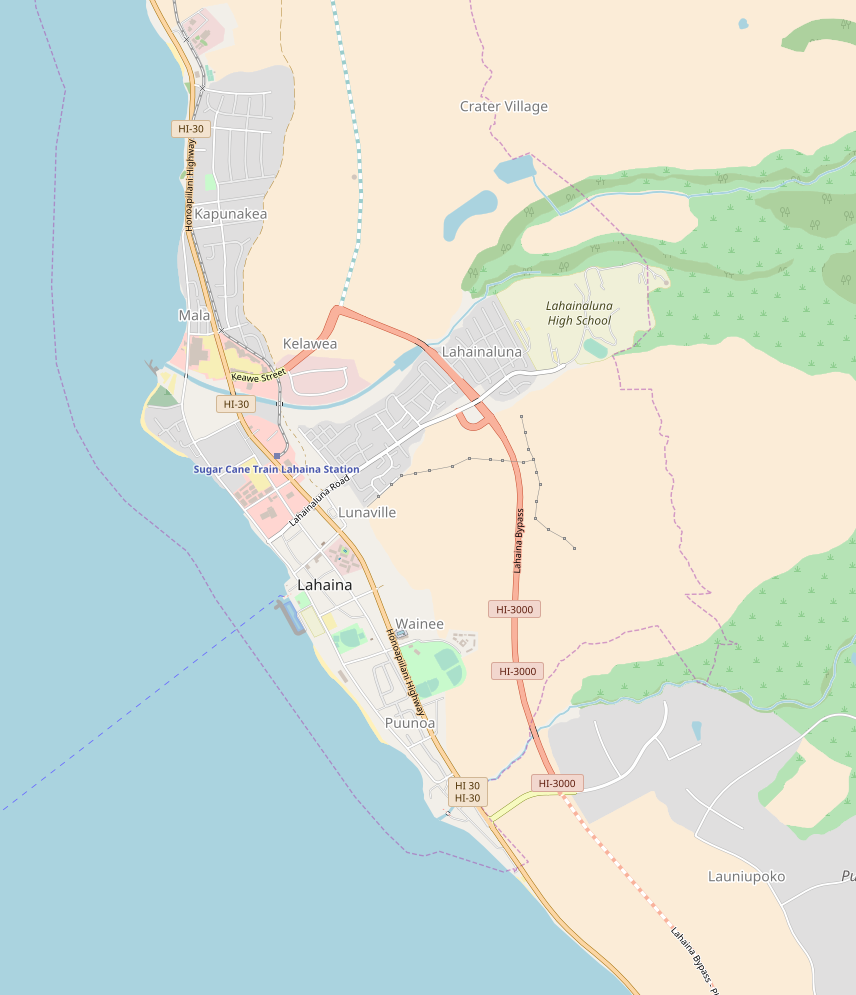
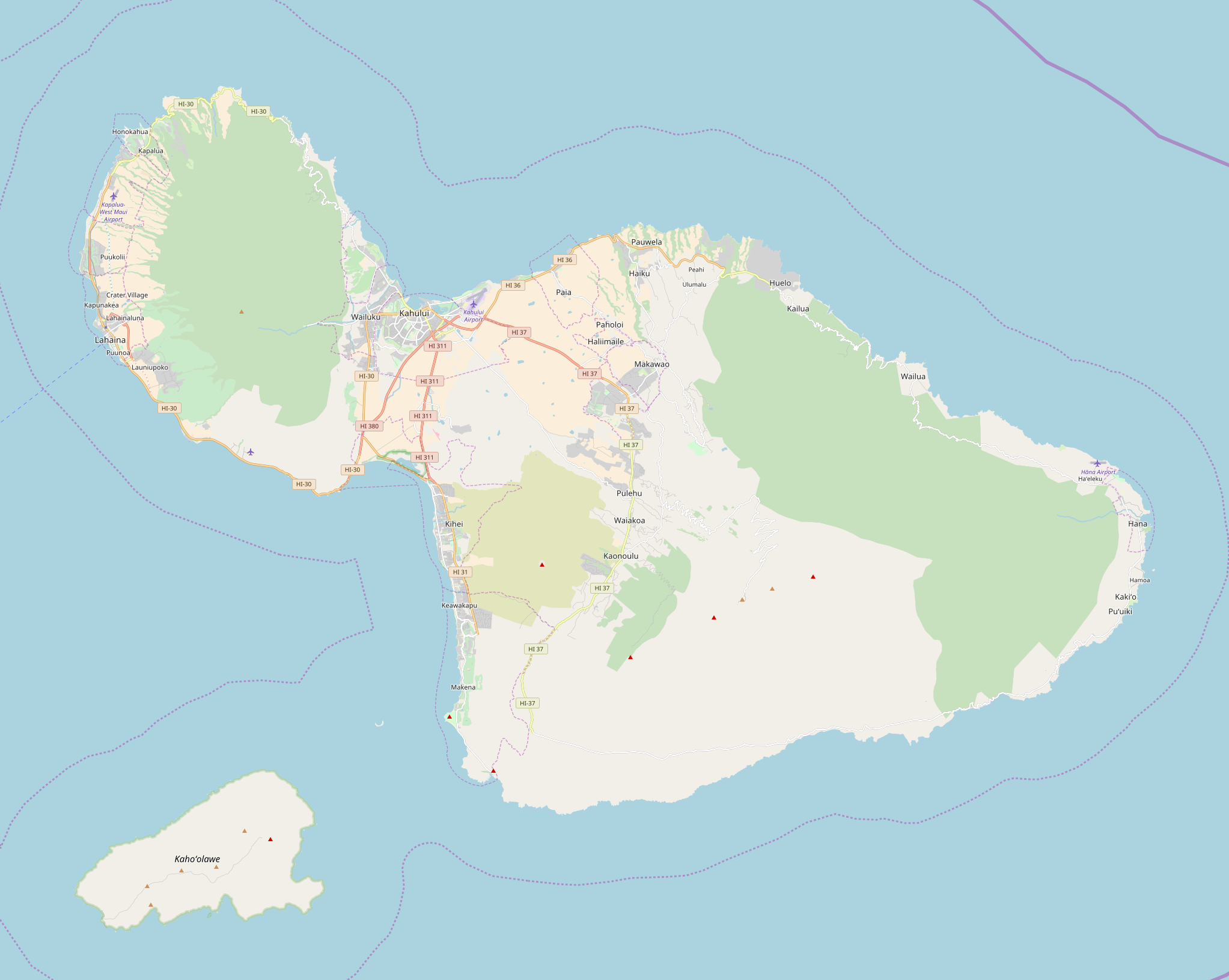
- Location within Lahaina, Hawaii Location within Maui Location within Hawaii
- Location: Front and Shaw Streets, Maluʻulu o Lele and Kamehameha Iki Parks, Lahaina, Hawaii
- Coordinates: 20°52′10″N 156°40′29″W
- Area: 12.3 acres (5.0 ha)
- Built: 1837
- NRHP reference No.: 97000408
- HRHP No.: 50-50-03-02967

Significant dates
- Added to NRHP: May 9, 1997
- Designated HRHP: May 9, 1997

Mokuʻula was a tiny island in Maluʻulu o Lele Park, Lahaina, Hawaiʻi, United States. It was the private residence of King Kamehameha III from 1837 to 1845 and the burial site of several Hawaiian royals. The 1-acre (4,000 m^{2}) island is considered sacred to many Hawaiians as a piko, or symbolic center of energy and power. It was added to the Hawaiʻi State Register of Historic Places on August 29, 1994, and to the National Register of Historic Places on May 9, 1997, as King Kamehameha III's Royal Residential Complex.

According to author P. Christiaan Klieger, "the moated palace of Mokuʻula...was a place of the "Sacred Red Mists," an oasis of rest and calm during the raucous, rollicking days of Pacific whaling". When the capital of Hawaiʻi moved from Lahaina to Honolulu and plantations diverted Mokuhinia's water source to irrigate their crops, Mokuʻula fell into disrepair.

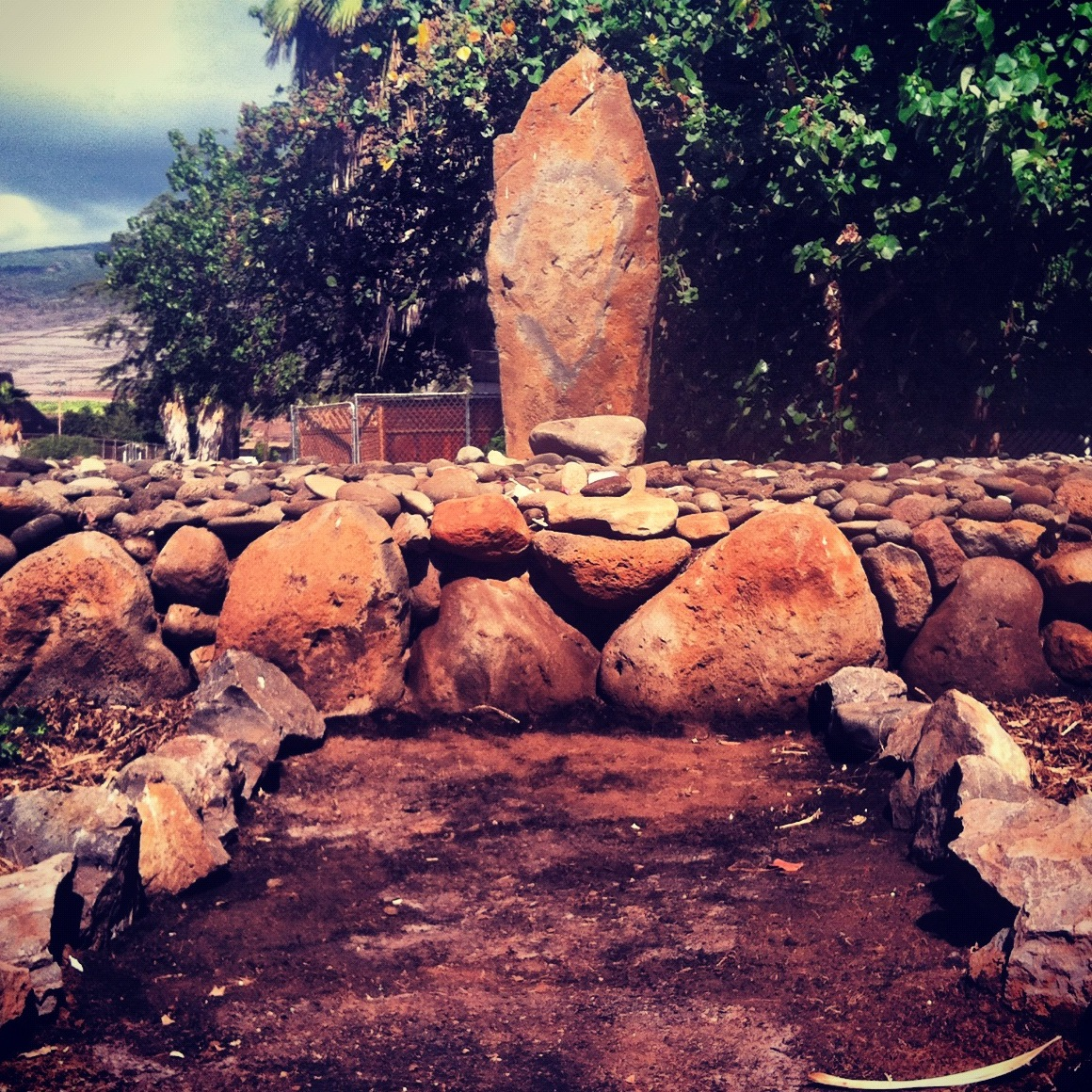

== Loko o Mokuhinia ==
Mokuʻula was surrounded by Mokuhinia, a 17 acres (6.9 ha) spring-fed, wetland pond. The pond was reported to be the home of Kihawahine, a powerful moʻo or lizard goddess. According to myth, the moʻo was a reincarnation of Piʻilani's daughter, the chiefess, Kalaʻaiheana. Hawaiians cultivated loʻi, or taro patches, and fishponds within Mokuhinia. Lahaina was once known as the Venice of the Pacific for its fishponds. The sugar cane industry diverted water from mountain streams in the late 1800s, which dried up the water source. In 1919, the county turned the land into a park and buried it beneath a baseball field.

== Restoration ==
Moku‘ula Restoration Projects, Lahaina

The non-profit organization Friends of Mokuʻula promoted the restoration of the sacred site from 1990 to 2011. From 1992 to 1995 and in 1999, archaeologists from Bishop Museum and Heritage Surveys surveyed the site and documented its features and boundaries. Bringing water back to this site and restoring Mokuʻula and Mokuhinia received renewed attention after the devastating wildfires in 2023, including commitments by Governor Josh Green and mayor Richard Bissen.
