= Krepel (mythology) =

Creature in Polish folklore

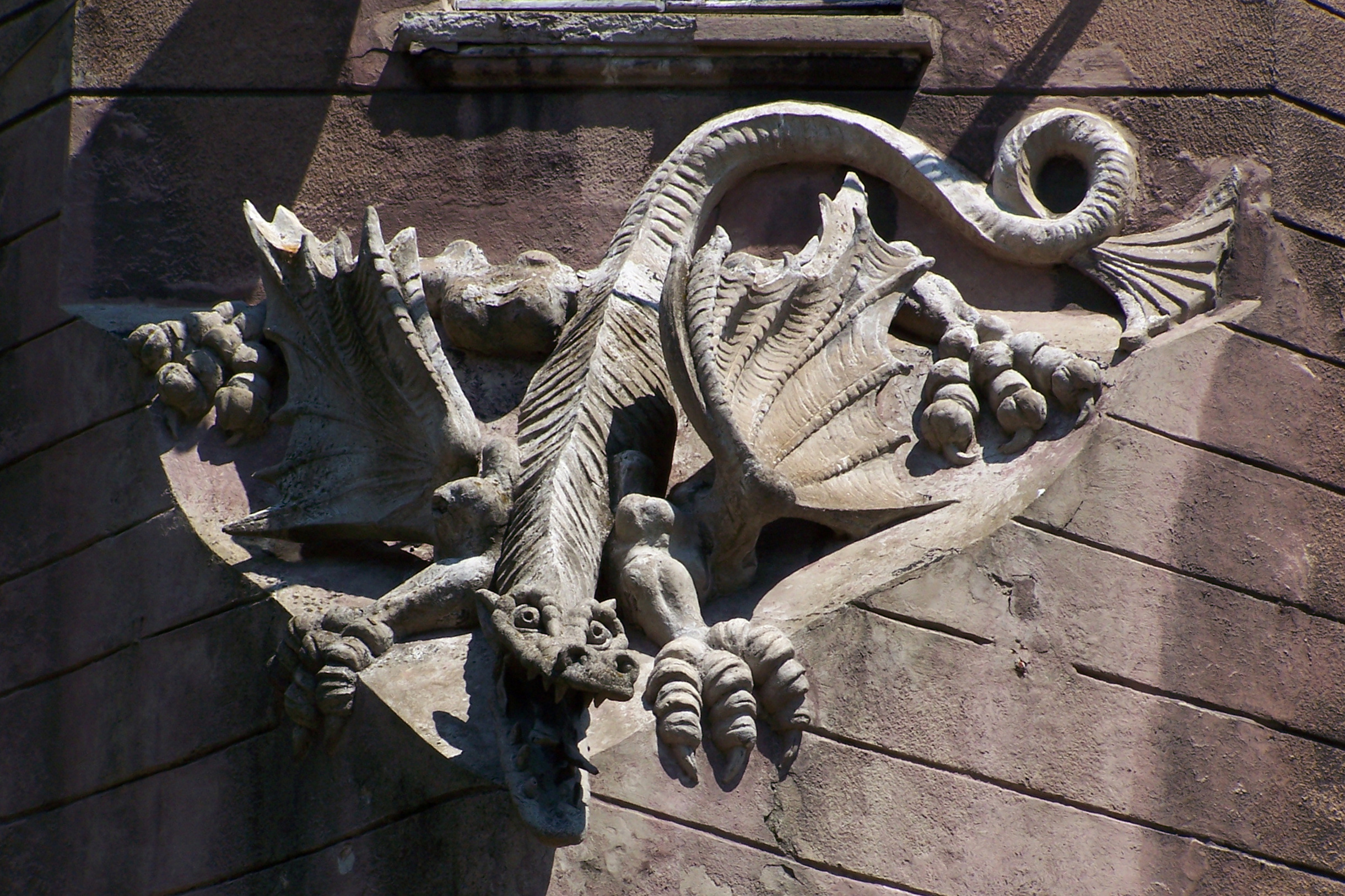
- The iconic dragon sculpture on Piłsudski Street.

Creature information
- Grouping: Cryptid
- Sub grouping: Dragon
- Similar entities: Wawel Dragon

Origin
- Region: Bytom in Upper Silesia
- Habitat: Forests

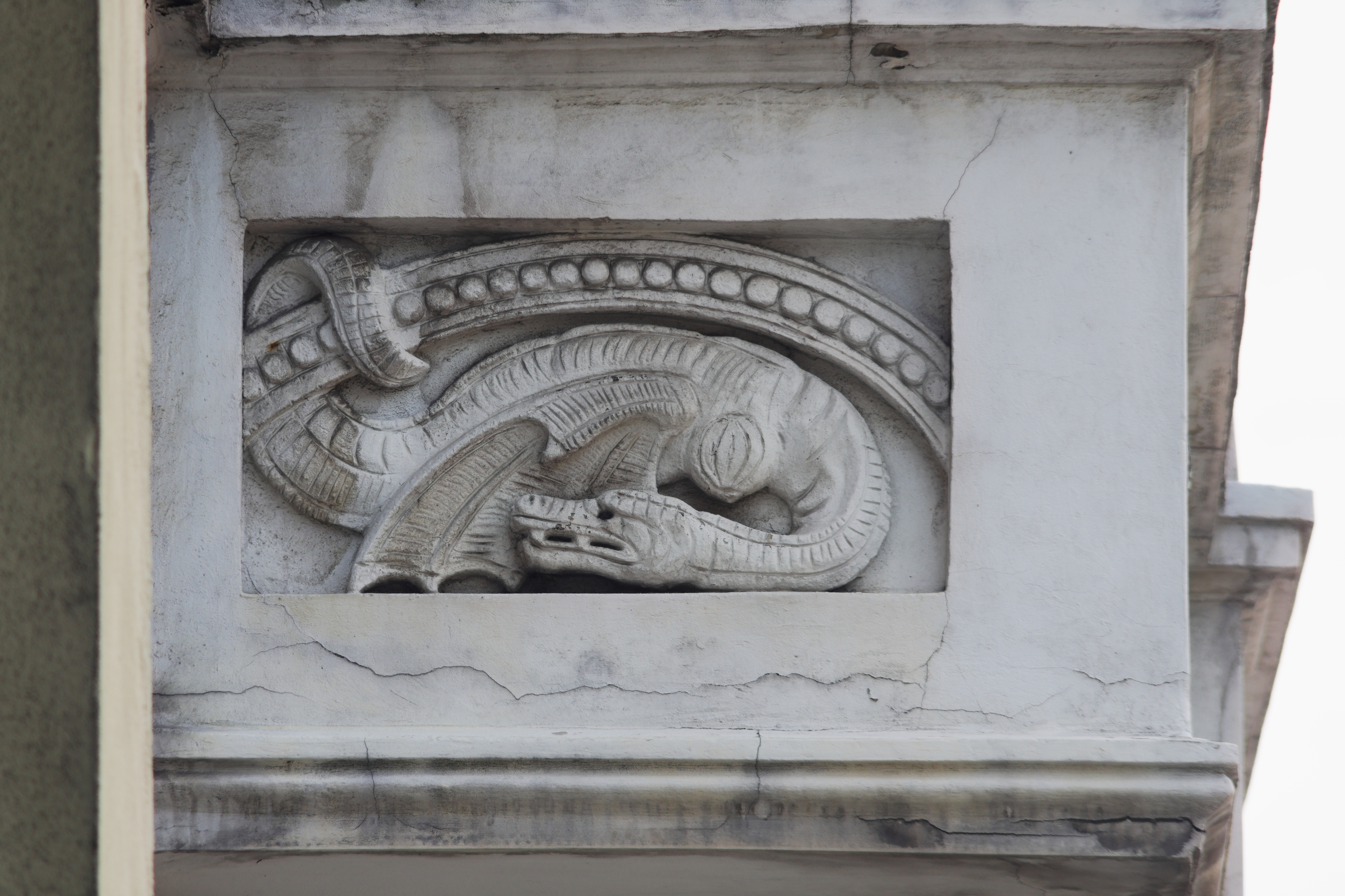
Relief of a dragon on a balcony of a building on the Bytom Market Square.

The Krepel, also known as the Bytom Dragon (Polish: smok bytomski; Silesian: bytōmski smok), is a legendary Polish dragon said to have inhabited the forests near Bytom in Upper Silesia. Unlike its Cracovian counterpart—the Wawel Dragon, Krepel is said to have been rather "well-mannered".

== The legend ==
As the story goes, back in the day when Bytom was a small settlement (gord) on St. Margaret’s Hill surrounded by impenetrable forests, local elders spoke of a dragon guarding a treasure. Intrigued by these tales, a young farmhand decided to venture out to the borderland of Bytom land and claim the treasure for himself.

Stumbling across scorched fields, fallen trees, and seeing knights' armour strewn about, the farmhand knew he was close. Reaching a grotto, he prepared himself to defeat the beast, clutching a club in his hand. As he was about to enter, a voice suddenly spoke from inside: "Why do you wish to start an unequal fight when I pose no threat to you? Instead, I invite you to my home and will even offer you some treasure! However, you’ll need to go to my second residence, as there’s not enough space here. I’ll go ahead first to put the kettle on."

Deciding to trust the creature, the farmhand set out for the dragon's residence, where they spent some time together. Having been gifted some of the dragon's treasure, the farmhand later bought a tenement on the grounds (on present-day Piłsudski Street), on which he placed an image in honour of his new friend—Krepel.

== In culture ==
- The Bytom Dragon has become an iconic symbol of the city, frequently featured on tourist souvenirs.
- The 2023 children's book Bytom Fantastyczny (English: Fantastic Bytom), written by Katarzyna Mołdawa and published by the Bytom City Council features a character based on the dragon sculpture on Piłsudski Street, depicted as a female dragon (Polish: smoczyca).
- The Polish Cultural Center in Kaliningrad developed a tourist route for Russian audiences featuring Krepel, dubbed "in the footsteps of dragons" (Russian: по следам драконов).

== See also ==
- Wawel Dragon
- Varsovian Basilisk
