= Agunua =

Agunua (alternate name Hatuibwari) is the cosmic serpent god of the people of San Cristobal Island (now better known as Makira) of the Solomon Islands, He is the chief god, and all other gods are only an aspect of him. The first coconut from each tree is sacred to Agunua. He is also the god of the sea. He is worshiped through prayer, with many requesting general good health and rich harvests of him.
