= Gangcheori =

Dragon-shaped monster in Korean mythology

Gangcheori (강철이; 強鐵) is a dragon-shaped monster in Korean mythology that was introduced in the 17th century. It is a monster that has traditionally been popular throughout the country. It also has been called Gangcheol (강철), Kkangcheol (깡철), and Ggoangcheol (꽝철).

One of the earliest records of Gangcheori being mentioned is the Jibong Yuseol (1614). In those days, there was an old saying, "Where Gangcheori goes it is like spring, even if it is fall." When author Lee Soo-kwang asked an old man in the countryside about the origin of the word, the old man told him about a monster called Gangcheori that burns down everything in a few miles.
