= Blue Ben =

Legendary dragon from Kilve in Somerset, England

Blue Ben is a legendary dragon from Kilve in western Somerset, England. The skull of a fossilized Ichthyosaur on display in a local museum is sometimes pointed out as belonging to him. A promontory near East Quantoxhead, approximately 1 kilometre (0.62 mi) from Kilve, also bears the name Big Ben.

== Legend ==
The story exists in more than one version. Blue Ben typically dwells in the shale caves along the Somerset coast, regularly bathing in the nearby waters to cool himself after breathing fire. In order to avoid getting stuck in the extensive mud flats between the water and his lair, he built the limestone causeway there to provide a safe passage for himself.

The Devil, who had watched Blue Ben for some time, decided to capture him for use as a mount. The Devil rode the dragon mercilessly through the fires of Hell until the dragon escaped. Hurrying to get back to the security of his lair, Blue Ben made the mistake of tramping through the mud flats. He got stuck in the mud, which consumed him. An alternative version of the story says that he lived inland, but went to Kilve to cool off.

== Skull ==
In the early 19th century, the Blue Lias shale formation outside of Kilve was quarried, during which process the fossilized skull of an Ichthyosaur was uncovered, that was said to be the remains of Blue Ben. The skull is now on permanent display in the Wells and Mendip Museum at Wells, Somerset, or the Museum of Somerset at Taunton.
