= Shenlong =

Dragon from Chinese mythology

Shenlong (simplified Chinese: 神龙; traditional Chinese: 神龍; pinyin: shén lóng, literally "god dragon" or "divine dragon", Japanese: 神龍, shinryū) is the spirit dragon from Chinese mythology who is the dragon god of the tempest and also a master of rain. He is of equal significance to other creatures such as Tianlong the celestial dragon, Zhulong the dragon of eruption, Qinglong the azure dragon, and Yinglong the responsive dragon.

The spiritual dragon is azure-scaled and governs the storms, clouds, and rain on which all agricultural life depends. Chinese, Japanese, Korean, and Vietnamese people would take great care to avoid offending him, for if he grew angry or felt neglected, the result was bad weather, drought, flood or thunderstorms.

Despite this, Shenlong appears to signify a special rank in the splendid robes and regalia of Chinese emperors. He was also five-clawed, which was iconic of the imperial dragon. Chinese empires have admired shenlong for centuries through festivals.

== Sources ==
- Karl Shuker: Dragons. A Natural History. Simon & Schuster, New York 1995, ISBN 0-684-81443-9, p. 89
