= Kihawahine =

Hawaiian shapeshifting lizard goddess

- Shapeshifting lizard goddess (moʻo)
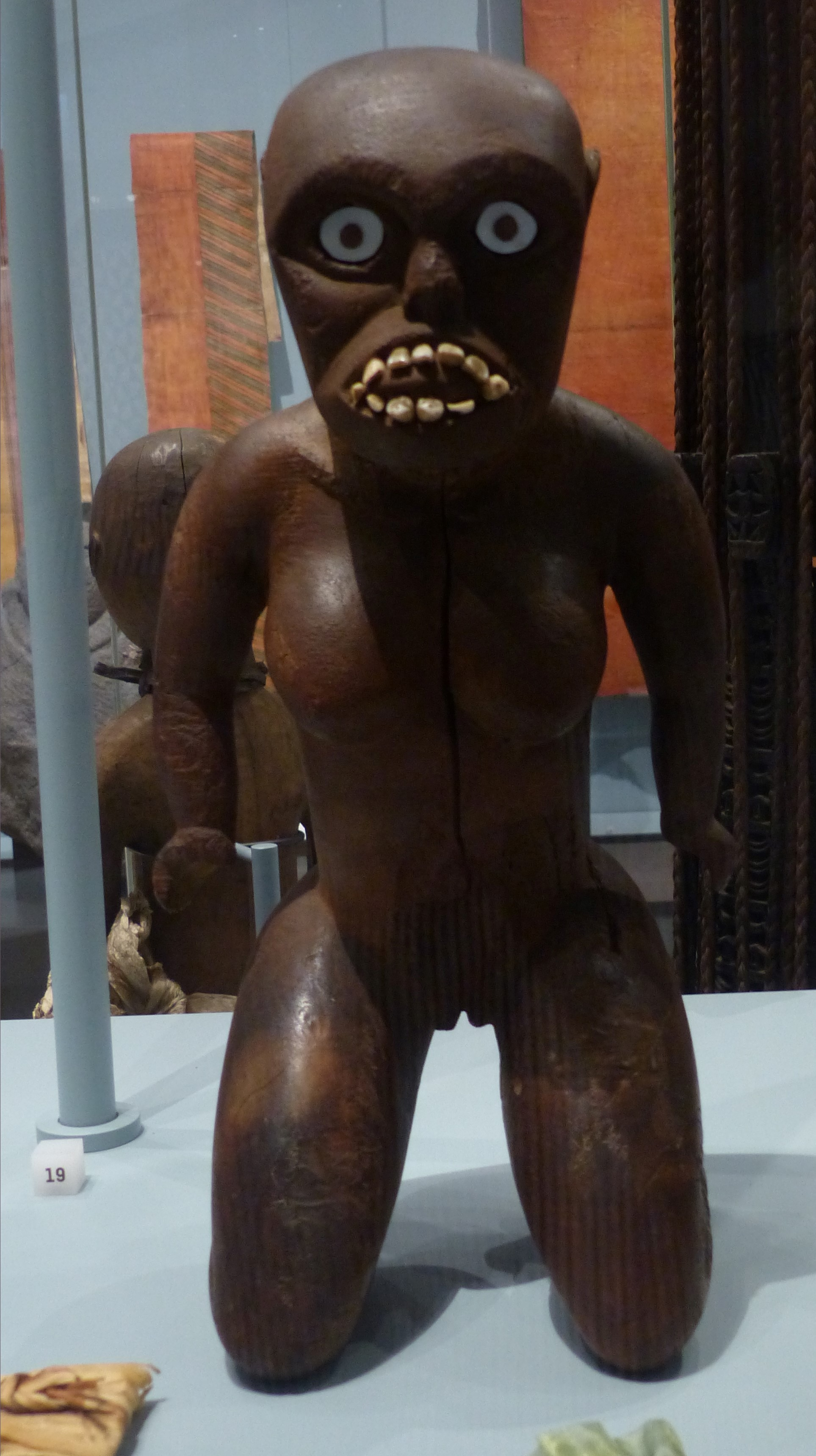
- Statue dedicated to Kihawahine
- Other names: Kihawahine Mokuhinia Kalamaʻula Kalāʻaiheana
- Venerated in: Hawaiian religion
- Abode: Mokuhinia, Mokuʻula
- Gender: Female
- Parents: Piʻilani (father); Lāʻieloheloheikawai (mother)
- Consort: Puna

Kihawahine is a Hawaiian shapeshifting lizard goddess (moʻo). When Kihawahine Mokuhinia Kalamaʻula Kalāʻaiheana, the daughter of the powerful sixteenth-century ruling chief of Māui, Piʻilani, and his wife Lāʻieloheloheikawai, died, her bones were deified, transforming her into the goddess. Kihawahine's home is Mokuhinia, a wetland pond on the island of Mokuʻula.

== Legend of Kihawahine and Haumea ==
Kihawahine and Haumea were both goddesses worshiped in Hawaiian temples. The war between the two goddesses began because both wanted to marry Puna, the chief of Oahu. While touring the island in search of a suitable place for surf, Puna was tricked into following Kihawahine far into the ocean. The two stayed a long time living in a cave. The goddess cared for her beloved, but nevertheless, he was a prisoner there and knew that if he tried to escape, he would be destroyed by Kihawahine.

After a time, Puna asked Kihawahine to get him icy water from Mauna Kea. She went, taking with her a water jug he had drilled a small hole into to ensure it wouldn't be filled up easily, and he followed her. He met with Pele, who, after a fight with Kihawahine, was able to take him back to Haumea. One day, while Haumea was out hunting for crabs in the sea, her husband wandered into a banana plantation that was owned by the island's new chief Kou. When he was discovered there, the watchmen took him to the chief who ordered for Puna to be killed. Haumea returned to find her husband's body hanging from a breadfruit tree. She ordered the tree to open and stepped inside it to stay with her husband.

== History and worship ==
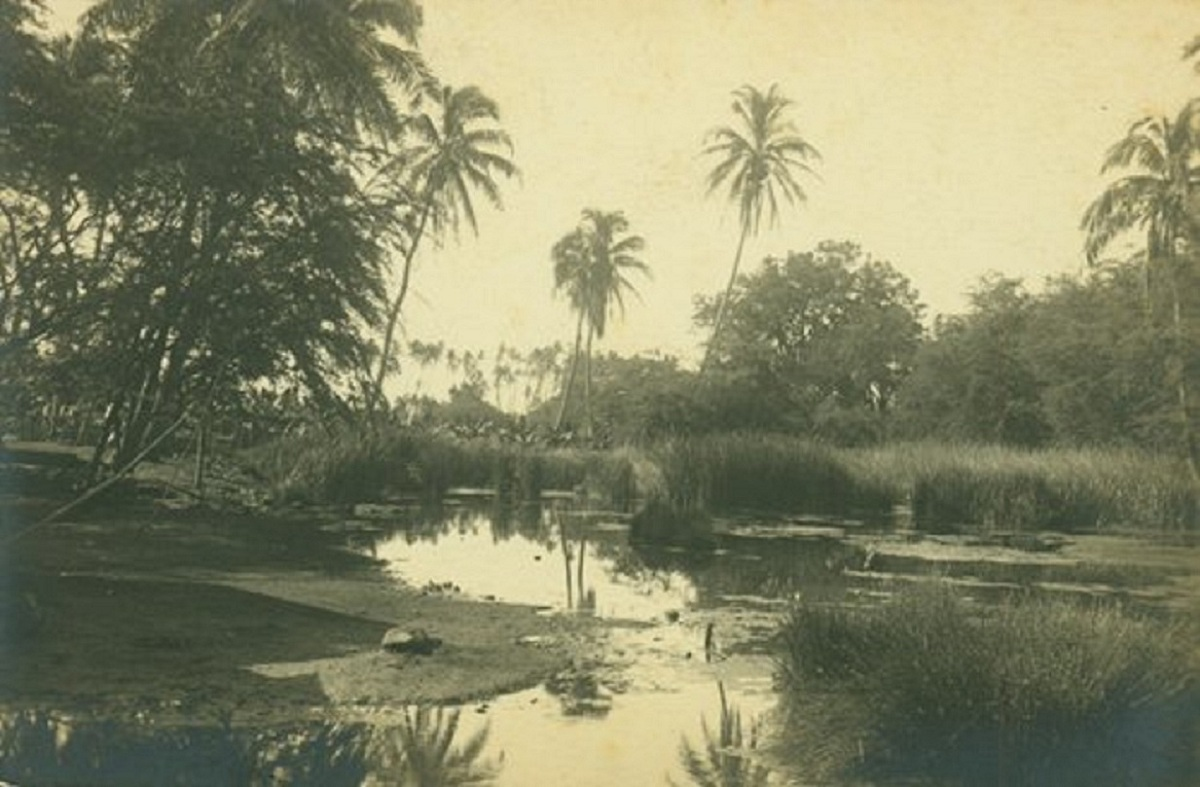
Mokuʻula in 1910, before being drained

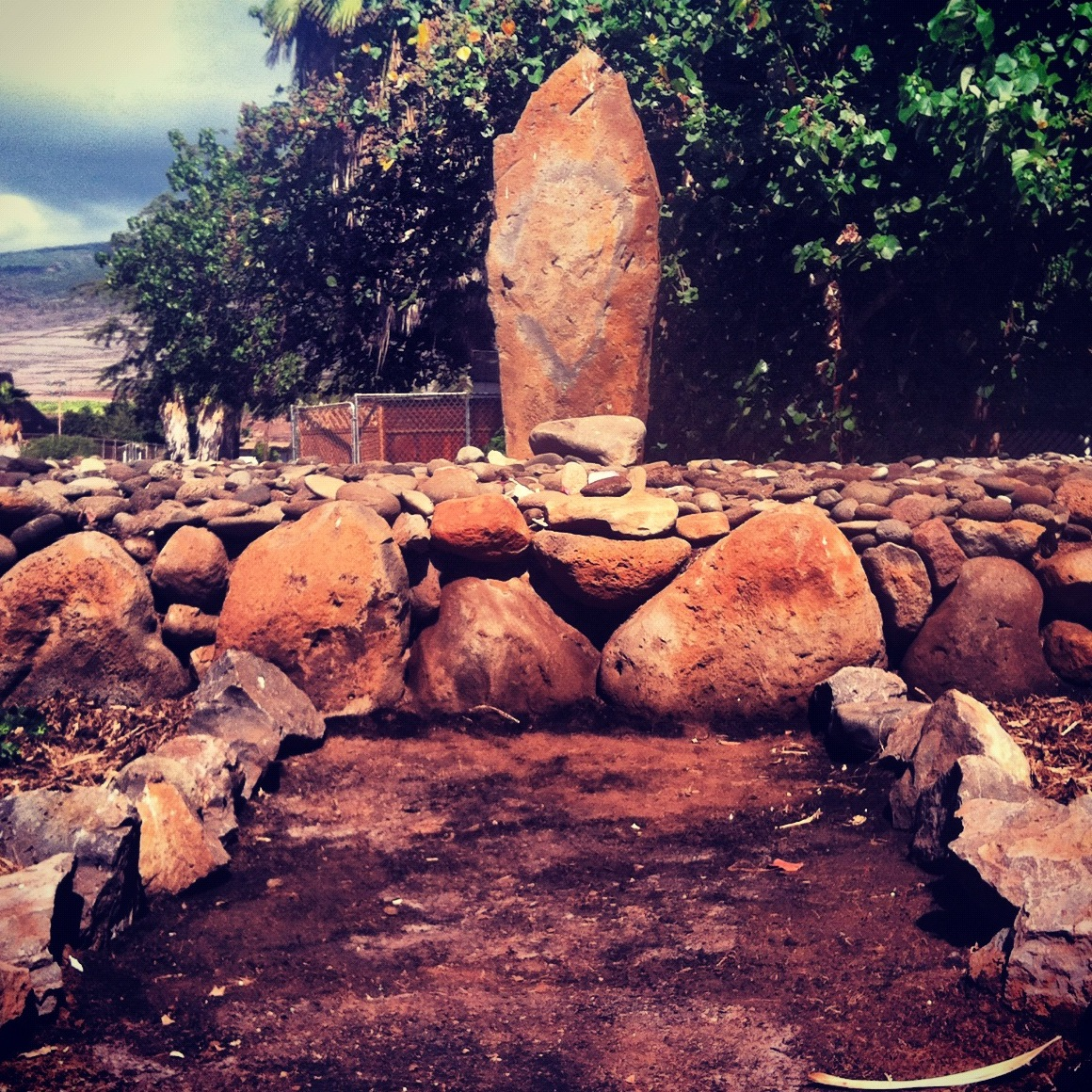
Mokuʻula shrine in 2012

Kihawahine was the personal god (ʻaumakua) of Keōpūolani, a wife of Kamehameha the Great. At Kamehameha's final battle at the Nuʻuanu Pali, he carried an image of Kihawahine with him. In modern times, a carving of Kihawahine served as the figurehead on Hōkūleʻa, a voyaging canoe launched in 1975 by the Polynesian Voyaging Society.

In the 1880s, Eduard Arning took the statue of Kihawahine from a burial site and brought it to the Ethnological Museum of Berlin.

The ponds that were previously present at Mokuhinia have dried up and, in the early 1900s, been filled in for use as a baseball park. The island has since been uncovered by the Friends of Mokuʻula, with restoration underway. Woodcarver Keola Sequeira has created a replica of the original Kihawahine statue for ceremonial purposes.

== See also ==
- Tūmatauenga, Māori war deity
- List of figures in the Hawaiian religion
