= Chilean mythology =

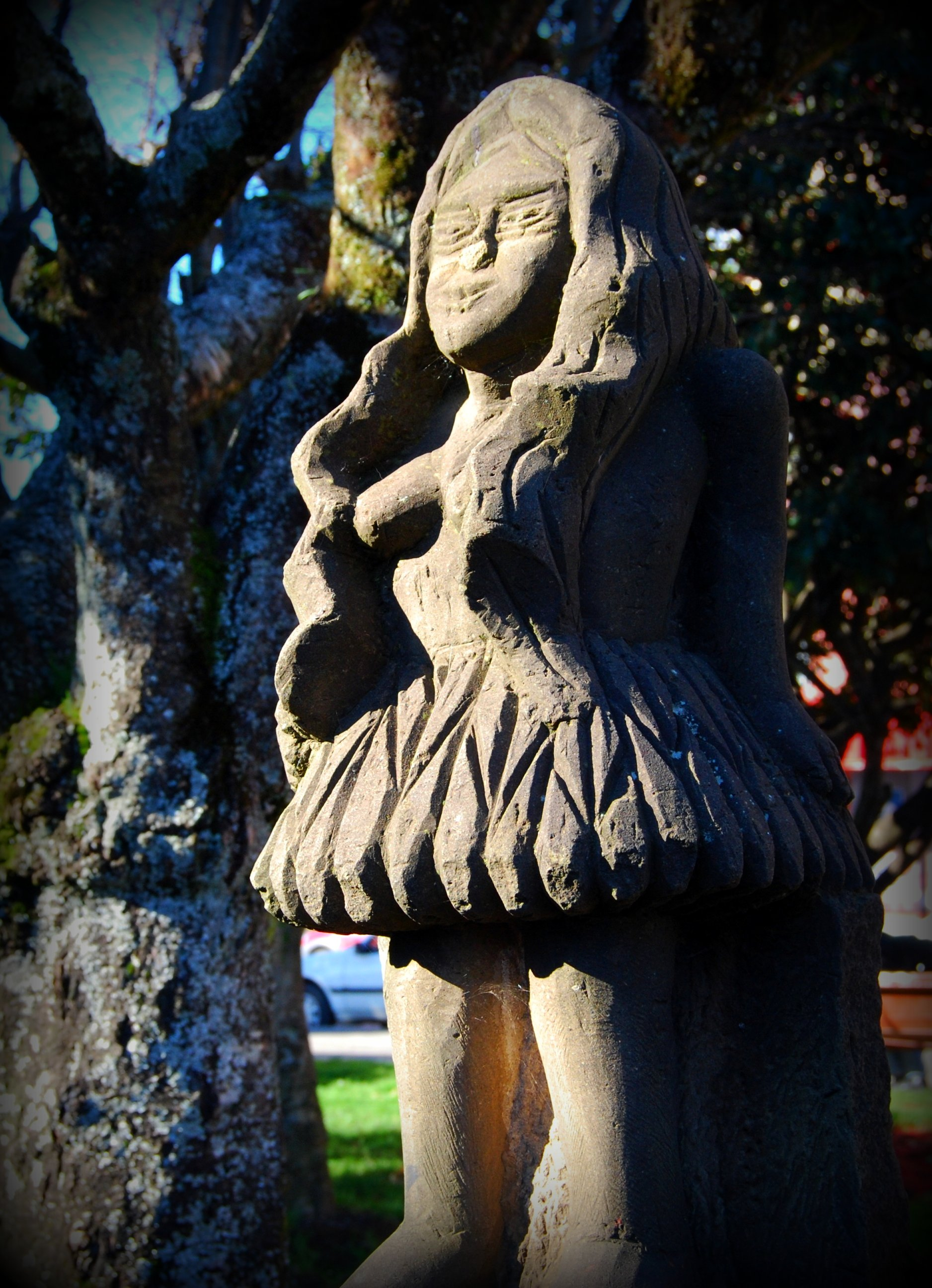
Statue of La Pincoya in Ancud, Chile, in 2009.

Chilean mythology includes the mythology, beliefs and folklore of the Chilean people.

== Evolution ==
Chilean mythology covers of a large collection of myths and legends from the beliefs of Chile's indigenous groups (Mapuche, Tehuelche, Changos, Diaguitas, Picunches, Pehuenches, Huilliches, Poyas and more).

Their mythology shows a significant influence by European colonization, mainly during the Spanish colonial period. These influences have helped Chilean mythology to evolve and become distinct from other local mythologies such as Chilota mythology. The variety of sources of these beliefs has in some causes caused syncretism or the fusion of different beings, coming from these diverse mythological origins, complimenting and differentiating Chilean mythology.

Similarly, the differences in landscapes and climates in the Chilean territory have configured defined geographical areas that experienced different historical circumstances. This favored the appearance of different and new beliefs and myths that enriched the mythology of this territory.

== Mythological division ==
In the study classification of ″Chilean mythology″, the myths are typically categorized geographically into Northern, Central, Easter Island and Southern Zones.

=== Northern Zone ===
These myths and legends involve characters closely related to the desert, religious devotion and mining. Examples include the myth of Alicanto, El Carbunculo, la Lola, el Yastay, the Achaches, the Umpillay, and the Quilpaná. Other legends are Juan Soldado, the treasure of Guayacán, the Payachatas, La Tirana and the virgin of Andacollo. The northern myths draw upon the Inca and pre-Incan civilizations, but they became distinguished through a rooted base in Spanish colonialism.

At the extreme north is Chungará Lake about which origin myths are told by the Aymara people. The legendary Zapam Zucum is a large-breasted legendary maternal being associated with vegetation, known in Chile as well as neighboring countries.

=== Central Zone ===
These myths assimilated of many mythological characters from Mapuche tribal beliefs.

The Spanish initially settled in the central zone, the most populated, leading to a unique mixture.

This zone hosts many legends modified from the oral tradition. Some of the mythical figures include Pedro Urdemales, la Calchona, la Llorona, el Culebrón, el Chonchón and the Piuchén. Legends include the Inca Lagoon, the Burial of Cacique Vitacura and Rere's Bell. Additionally, stories discuss the appearance of the devil and encounters with witches.

Another is the legend of the treasure of Juan Fernández, in the Juan Fernández archipelago.

=== Easter Island ===
The most important myth source is Easter Island. The inhabitants of Easter Island, the Polynesian Rapa Nui people, created singular explanations about the creation of man and their land. Examples of these myths include: Make-Make and Aku-Aku.

=== Southern Zone ===
This zone was also influenced by Mapuche indigenous beliefs. Legends include the City of the Caesars, The Three Pascuales, and spirits of Mapuche beliefs like Pillán, the Wangulén, the Wekufes, the Anchimallén, Tented and Caicos, and the Cuero.

==== Chiloé ====
The Chiloé Archipelago has its own stories, due to the geographical isolation and the union of indigenous and Spanish traditions. Natural phenomena such as mist, strong winds, thick forests, and rough seas feature in legends there. The most important are the Caleuche and the Trauco, followed by the Fiura, the Pincoya, the Invunche, the Camahueto, the Basilisco chilote, and the Millalobo.

== Mythologies and Legends ==
The most important sources are:

- Indigenous:
  - Mapuche mythology
  - Rapa Nui mythology
- Others:
  - Chilote mythology
  - City of the Caesars
  - Alicanto

== Iconography ==
Marcela Donoso, a Chilean painter, made a set of oil paintings describing 30 Chilean myths

== See also ==
- Culture of Chile
