= Sirena chilota =

Chilote mythological aquatic being

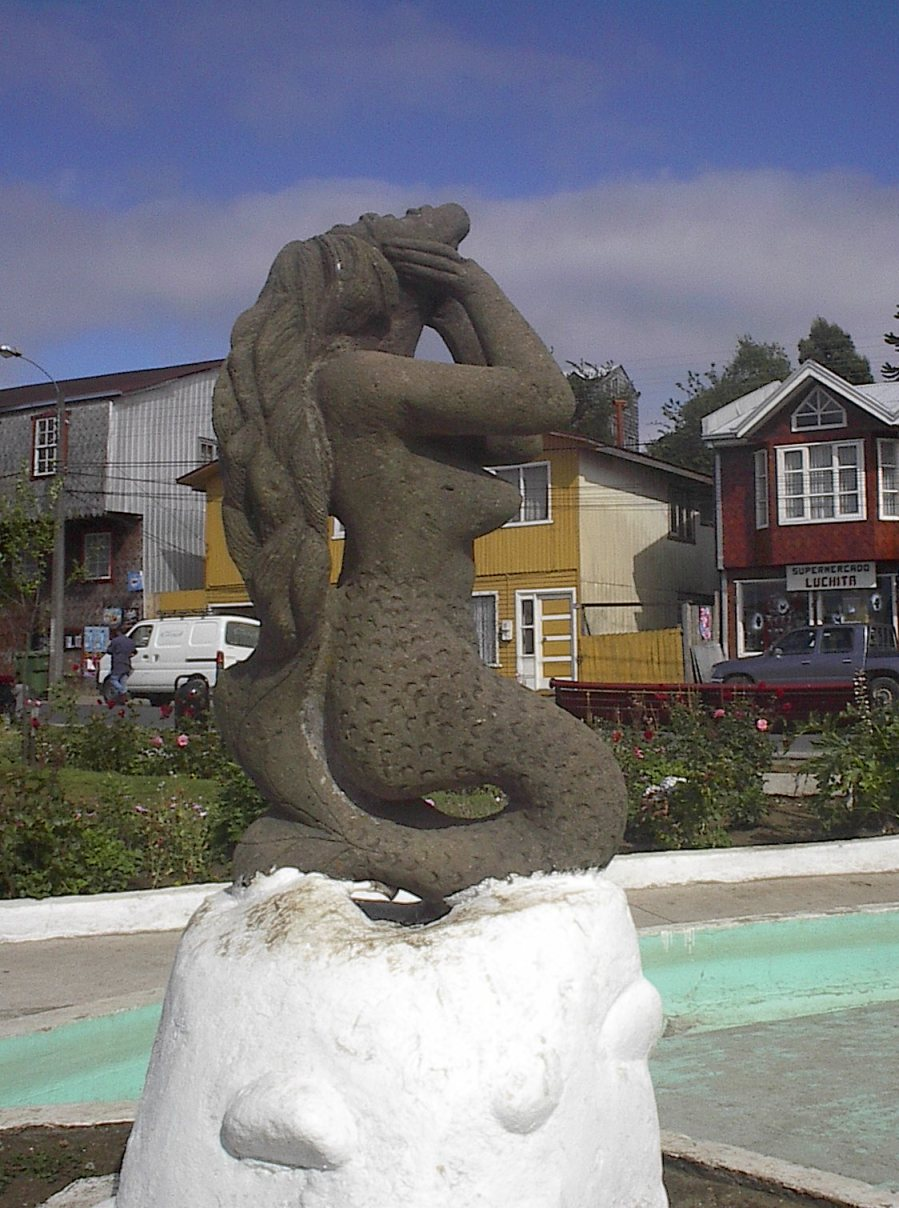
A sculpture of the Sirena Chilota in Chonchi, Chile.

The Sirena Chilota is an aquatic being belonging to Chilote mythology. She may originate from a combination of the Sumpall from Mapuche mythology and the mermaid from European mythology.

== Appearance ==
Like a mermaid, the Sirena Chilota is half fish and half human with long, blonde hair and golden scales. Her human half is youthful, resembling a beautiful teenager.

== Legend ==
According to Chilote legend, especially among fishermen, she is the youngest daughter of Millalobo (king of sea, in Chilote mythology) and the human Huenchula. Millalobo gave her the task of shepherding and caring for the fish. She also helps her siblings (the Pincoya and Pincoy) carry the bodies of drowned sailors to the Caleuche. The drowned sailors are revived and given a new life as crew members on the Caleuche.

The Sirena Chilota is lives near the island of Laitec in the Chiloé Archipelago. On a moonlit night, a sailor may be lucky to see her sitting on the rocks and combing her long, golden hair with a golden comb. Sailors must be wary though, as she usually sings alluring love songs. The Sirena Chilota may also help sailors she likes by shepherding fish to their boats.

When the Sirena Chilota lures men into the ocean, they cannot resist her. Even once they realize she is part fish, it is already too late to escape. She cries, and between her tears she sings a song about her loneliness. The Sirena Chilota then brings them to the bottom of the ocean to live in a palace with her family. The man cannot return to his old life on earth, but he will receive immense treasure and riches. Any man that somehow escapes or the Sirena Chilota loses interest in may return to land, but he cannot dispel her magic. His future descendants are born with fish tails, and the rest of the town will know he slept with the Sirena Chilota.

== In popular culture ==
The Sirena Chilota plays an important role in the film Caleuche. The protagonist, Isabel Millalobos, appears to have a link to the Sirena Chilota since her family has previously received gifts from the Caleuche.
