= Piuchén =

Legendary creature of southern Chile

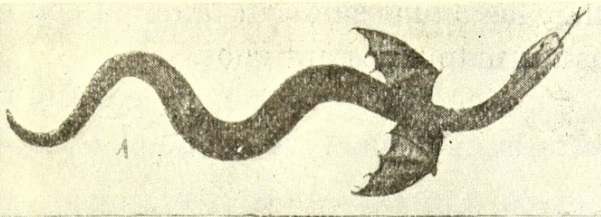
Pihuicheñ of the Mapuche

The Piuchén (Peuchén, Pihuchén, Piwuchén) or Piguchen (Piguchén), from Mapuche: piwichen for “to dry people” (transliterations: Pihuichéñ, Pihuichen, Pihuichén, Pihuychen) is a vampiric creature from the Mapuche mythology and Chilote mythology known in much of Chile.

This blood-sucker often assumes the guise of a flying snake, or a large lizard with bat wings, that emits strange whistling sounds or hisses that stun or kill its enemy or prey. It is also described as an avian-piscine-human composite, or a shapeshifter taking on the form of animals.

The lore may have derived from encounters with the common vampire bat.

== Nomenclature ==
The name Piuchén (Piuchénes) derives from Mapuche Piwichen (also styled piwicheñ, pihuicheñ) for "mythic bird, bat" or "flying serpent". The piwichen may further break down into piwn 'to dry' + ché 'people'.

Some forms are: pihuichén given by Rodolfo Lenz, (Note: Lenz Diccionario) peuchén by Francisco Cavada; Andrés Febrés gave the form Pihuychén, (Note: Febrés (1882) apud Cavada with the spelling emended to Pihuychén (var. Piuchéng, Piguchén). Febrés gloss stated "It whistles as it flies, and whoever sees it dies ("vuela cuando silba, ye el que la ve se muere"), but Guevara citing Febrés truncates this to saying it brings death to whoever sees it fly (Febrés menciona el ... Pimuychen causadaba la muerte al que la veia volar).) which had been misprinted. (Note: As "Pimuychen",)

Another linguist suggests onomatopoeic simulation of the bird-call of the pidén (Pardirallus sanguinolentus, species of rail).

== Legend ==
In the mythology of the Mapuche, the original creature known as the Pihuichen (Note: Pihuichéñ used by Guevara (1908), changed to Pichuichen in Vicuña (1915), reverted to Pihuichéñ in Perez (2004). For pronunciation, note piwichen orthography.) generally assumes the form of a winged serpent. It flies off at night, sucking the blood of animals and humans asleep in the forest. It prefers the season when the roble tree sprouts, and is considered a forest spirit. In hot heat, the creature remains clinging to the bark of a tree, so that the dribbling blood may be found underneath. (Note: Guevara, Tomás Psicolojía (1908) and Historia I: 231 (=Ch. VIII, not found in 1929 edition of Historia) paraphrased by Vicuña Cifuentes)

One source differentiates between the Mapuche Pihuichen and the later Piguchen.

=== Appearance ===
In various versions with local variations, it may be a serpent with feathered wings (as told in Vichuquén), or alternatively a large lizard with bat wings.

The Pihuchén is a black winged snake about 0.5 metres (1.6 ft) in length, with a bristly body, according to the lore in the vicinity of Santiago, whose cattle fell victim. The informant stated the bristles were deadly poison upon contact with skin, making (live) capture an impossible task, hence the eradication by fire without handling the beast.

The creature enjoys incredible longevity, and in old age, the winged serpent may transform into a rooster-sized bird, or a young turkey sized bird. Others say it transforms in its old age into a bug-eyed a huge frog with squat broad wings inadequate for long-distance flying, covered in fine down feathers (as told in Talagante).

In another telling from Ovalle in the Coquimbo Region, the Piuchén "has a parrot's beak and wings, a toad-like body and a snake-like tail". (Note: Silvestre, José (19 February 1904). "Algo de mitología zoológica en Ovalle". El Obrero., quoted by Vicuña Cifuentes.) An actual specimen supposedly caught in the Coquimbo area was deduced to be a vampire bat (cf. § Fauna identification), nevertheless, the myth about it ascribed reptilian-avian-mammalian features to it. (Note: Latcham, Ricardo E. (1915) "Sobre algunos mitos zoologicos chilenos" quoted by Vicuña Cifuentes. Floridor Pérez attributes the identification of D. dorbinyi of the Coquimbo Region to some "naturalist".)

The abbot Juan Ignacio Molina also wrote a paragraph on the "winged quadruped, or a kind of large bat". (Note: Molina, Juan Ignacio (1782) Saggio sulla storia naturale del Chili, p. 228 apud Vicuña Cifuentes) A later lexicographer remarked that Molina had been deceived by a gift of some dead rare animal claimed to be a piuchén, and the abbot only described such cadaver in detail.

Its ability to shapeshift into human, plant, or animal in certain instances has also been claimed.

=== Behavioral traits ===
It reputedly makes a strange whistling sound (noun: silbidos, verb: silba), some say it emits the shrilly whistle three times to announce its presence. Others considered its hiss and gaze capable of killing prey, or the gaze may paralyze the victim and the creature then leisurely feeds on the blood of the stupefied victim. Besides the deadly gaze, some claim the creature is born from the egg of a red rooster or from the corpse of a brujo witch doctor punished for a blunder. (cf. basilisk from an egg and mandrake growing by the gallows).

The claim that it seeks sheep blood when humans are not found, according to one source is contradicted by the opinion of Vicuña Cifuentes that the creature prefers animal blood over human. (Note: The Piguchén "It feeds on the blood of mules. (Coinco)"; "sucks the blood of animals. (Vichuquén)"; "a snake that devours sheep, mainly black ones, for which it shows particular predilection. (Coihueco de Chillán)".) Herders are said to blame the monster for their sheep and goat found slaughtered overnight. (Note: Cf. Vowell (1831)'s tract.) According to some, the Piuchén takes the hearts of its victims without leaving a mark on the body.

Richard Longeville Vowell, a volunteer in the Thomas Cochrane campaign in Chile c. 1820, is the attributed author of an 1831 memoir which described the pehüechèn [sic], which he was convinced was a bat. Nevertheless he reported the lore around it, as told by the huasos of Aconcagua Valley (Note: East of Quillota and north of Santiago.) who loved fantastic stories. Most of them could swear to at least knowing a relative or friend who has slaughter the beast in the act of attacking (and presumably in the process of killing ) sheep. The superstition among them was that they could suck blood at a distance, merely by hovering above, and their shrieks were held to be dangerous.

=== Habitat ===
As for the aboriginal notion of a forest spirit, one source associates the beast with the forest of "Chilean larch" ("bosque de alerces"), i.e., forest of the Chilean larch or "false larch". The piuchén is so powerful it effortlessly knocks down this Chilean larch (alerces), the tique, or other huge trees, according to Chilote lore (of the Chiloé Archipelago).

The black, bristled piguchén dwelled in the mountain range (presumably Andes Mountains) and would go to Santiago or San Bernardo to feast on cattle.

In Chilote folklore, the creature is described as a protean composite creature, part human, snake, bird, and fish, and covered with all sorts of things such as grass, bushes, and twisted horn-like protrusions (and also resembling a frog and a bat), preferring to dwell in lakes and rivers, haunting the local Lake Huillinco. It allegedly can raise gigantic waves that cause nearby boats to sink. And it exudes some sort of irritant from its body that causes rashes.

Other sources say the creature's habitat occurs in marshy terrain or at the bottom of lagoons.

=== Combatting against ===
Some say it is a green snake that dwells in the heart of trees. (Note: Version of José Santos González Vera apud Plath.) Its presence can be tracked because it leaves a trail of bloody urine it excretes, which may also be found dribbling beneath the tree it uses as lair (as told in Melipilla).

As aforementioned, the Santiago area informant claimed that the beasts poisoned bristles made live capture impossible. Thus, to kill a Pihuchén living in a Tree hollow (hueco), it is suggested the hole be plugged with hefty cloth then to set the tree on fire.

Mapuche belief was that the Pihuichéñ coordinated its attacks with the machi (herbal healer), and they were in alliance, but it is also claimed that only the machi alone can defeat the creature, as he or she can counteract the hypnosis with herbal cures.

Superstition in Ovalle recommends waving a white flag or whistling in a bottle to ward the creature off, and adds that adding white goat to one's flock diminishes the chance of being attacked. In Macul, Santiago Province, the old saying was that grouping the goats in sixes within the herd will protect them from the creature. Another informant (probably around the rim of Greater Santiago) swore blowing an ox horn (cuerno de buey, cf. erkencho) would scare it away and protect the herd of cattle.

== Fauna identification ==
The lore of the blood-sucking creature may well have derived from an actual vampire bat species. The bat of scientific name Desmodus dorbinyi [sic] (recté D. dorbignyi) was given in older literature for the animal associated with myth.

According to modern zoologists, this species name is a disused synonym of Desmodus rotundus, the common vampire bat, also known by the Spanish vernacular "Piuchén".

== Parallels ==
Floridor Pérez notes some parallel with the "goat-sucker" Chupacabra that he claims had devastated livestock especially in Chile's Cuarta Region (Coquimbo Region) into the 20th century. He wonders if the Piguchén might have been the precursor of the Chupacabra.

== See also ==
- Colo Colo
- Basilisco Chilote
- Chonchon
- Chupacabra
