= Millalobo =

Chilote Mythology

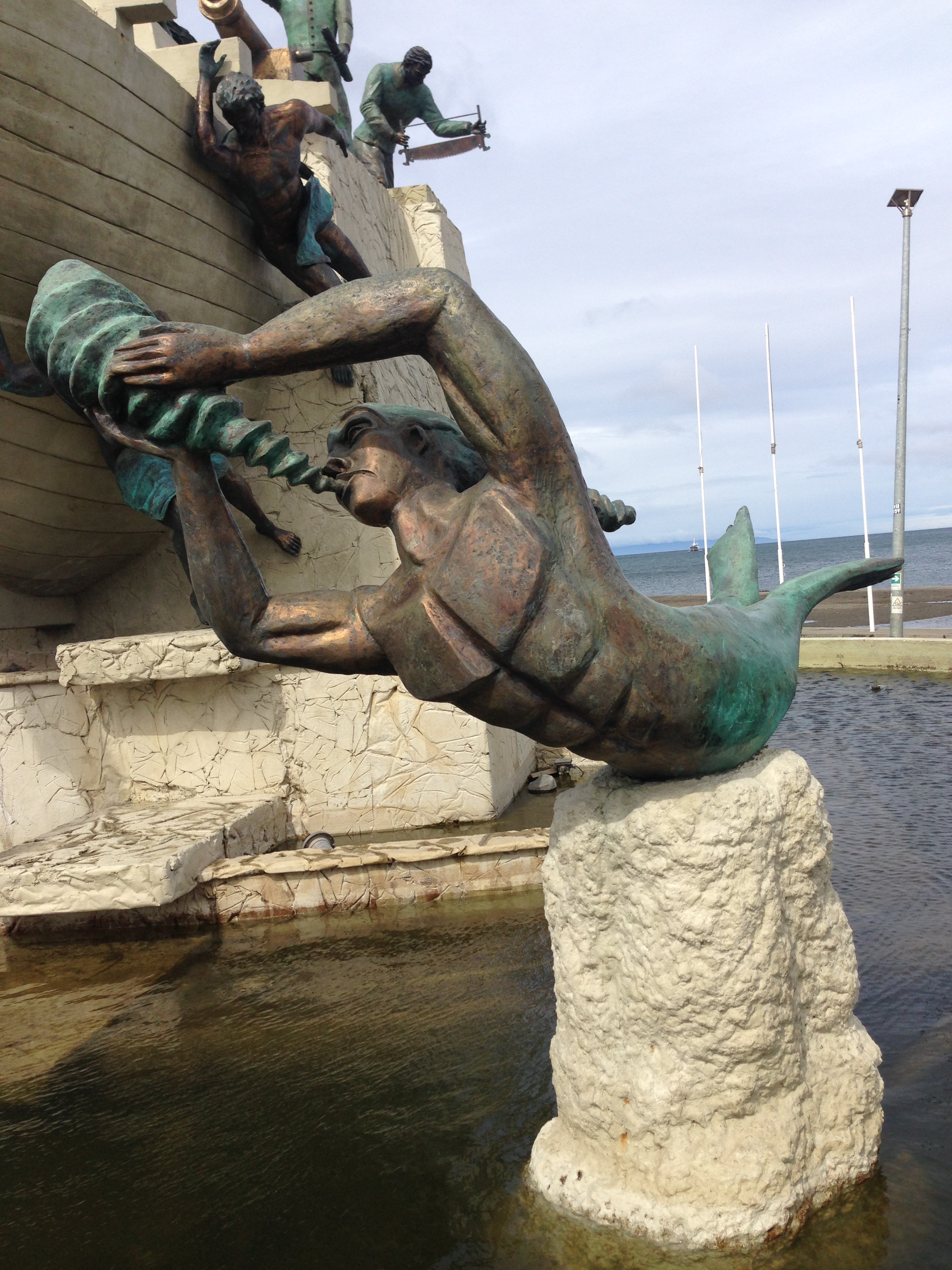
Statue of Millalobo in Punta Arenas

Millalobo (from the mapudungun milla: "gold" and the Spanish lobo: wolf in allusion to the sea lion) is an important being in Chilote mythology. He is the most powerful being of the sea after Caicai and was chosen by Caicai to be his representative and govern all that resided in the sea.

== Description ==
The Millalobo is a being like a Triton, lower half sea lion and upper half human, his face a mixture of both. He was born from the mating between a woman and a sea lion who saved her from drowning, at the time of the mythical battle between Tenten Vilu and Caicai Vilu. The Millalobo's fur is golden, hence his name. It is said that this mythical being cannot talk and he can only communicate through a bleat similar to the sea lion's, even though, the meaning of his bleat is understandable to human beings.

== Myth ==
The tale says that upon Caicai Vilu seeing the Millalobo, he found it to his liking, and after its battle against Tenten, Caicai wanted to bestow his power on someone, and he chose the Millalobo.

The Millalobo lives at the bottom of the sea, together with his wife Huenchula and their three children, The Pincoya, The Pincoy and La Sirena Chilota, who help him in his task of managing the seas. Due to his great work of managing the seas, the Millalobo has as underlings many mythological sea creatures to do different tasks: from seeding and taking care of the fish and shellfish, to managing the sea climate, as well as guiding and taking care of the dead brought by the sea. The Millalobo is the creator of the ghost ship known as Caleuche. It is said that evil sea creatures must pay respect to the Millalobo as well as benevolent ones.
