= Caballo marino chilote =

Aquatic creature in Chilote mythology

Creature information
- Similar entities: Hippocampus
- Folklore: Chilote mythology

Origin
- Country: Chile

The Caballo Marino Chilote (chilote sea horse) is an aquatic creature of the Chilote mythology of Chile, that bears some resemblance to the hippocampus.

Legend says that the "Caballo marino chilote" is an invisible creature, which could only be seen by those with magical powers. The creature would look like a normal horse, but would have the longer snout, golden mane, four paws in the form of fins, and a long tail, similar to the tail of a fish. They can exist in various sizes, from dwarfs to giants. The Brujo Chilote (a type of sorcerer or warlock) would use a "Caballo marino chilote" as transportation to get to the Caleuche ghost ship.
