= Pincoy =

Chilote mythology

The Pincoy is a male water spirit of the seas, belonging to the Chilote mythology of Chiloé, Chile.

It looks equivalent to a merman creature, his body would be like a large sea lion, colour bright golden, with handsome and manly human face and long golden hair, being magically attractive to the women. He is the son of Millalobo (mythical king of the seas of Chiloé) and the human Huenchula; his sisters, are the Sirena chilota and the Pincoya (which also is his wife). With his sisters he carries the dead from the sea unto the Caleuche. In addition, he is responsible of singing a beautiful and strange song, so that the Pincoya start her magical dance, for fertility of the sea.
