= Chilote mythology =

The Chilote mythology or Chilota mythology is formed by the myths, legends and beliefs of the people who live in the Chiloé Archipelago, in the south of Chile. This mythology reflects the importance of the sea in the life of Chilotes.

Chilote mythology is based on a mixture of indigenous religions and beliefs from the natives (the Chonos and Huilliches) that live in the Archipelago of Chiloé, and the legends and superstitions brought by the Spanish conquistadores, who in 1567 began the process of conquest in Chiloé and with it the fusion of elements that would form a separate mythology.

Chilota mythology flourished, isolated from other beliefs and myths in Chile, due to the separation of the archipelago from the rest of the Spanish occupation in Chile, when the Mapuches occupied or destroyed all the Spanish settlements between the Bío-Bío River and the Chacao channel following the disaster of Curalaba in 1598.

== Hierarchy of mythical creatures ==
The highest rank belongs to the sea serpents Tenten Vilu and Caicai Vilu, who in a legendary, titanic battle, created the Archipelago. Below Caicai Vilu is the Millalobo as the king of the seas, and his wife, the Huenchula. Their three children, the Pincoy, the prince of the sea, and the Pincoya and Sirena chilota, princesses, aid them in the work of ruling the seas. Below these are the different mythical creatures, given ranks by the Millalobo.

Earthly creatures have no hierarchy.

=== Human Beings in Mythology ===
Certain people are said to have magical powers. Witches have the ability to fly and have various creatures such as the Invunche under their command. In addition there are machis, people who play an important role in Mapuche culture and religion, though their functions and characteristics for the Chilote are somewhat different.

== Other creatures ==
Creature	Description
El Basilisco	This creature sucks the saliva out of its victim, killing the prey.
El Caballo Marino Chilote	He carries wizards and dead sailors to El Caleuche.
El Caleuche	"A phantom ship" that sometimes sails near the shore of Chiloé. It carries wizards and dead shipwrecked sailors. It is controlled by Millalobo's orders.
Cuchivilu (from the Castilian dialectal cuchi: pig and from the mapudungun filu: snake)	A half fish and haft pig from Chiloe mythology who attributed the damage that occurs in the fishing pens.
The Camahueto	A special calf with a silver horn. It is said that wizards can use it to cure "sexual dysfunctions".
Cherruves	With the body of a snake and the head of a human, he controls the "appearance of comets" and is responsible for bringing misfortune to whoever he visits.
La Fiura	She arouses sexual desires in men. When she is "satisfied", she drains the victim of his energy, which kills him. She is married to El Trauco.
Huallipenyi	With the body of a goat and the head of a cow, it is symbolized with fog, and causes babies to have physical mutations when born.
La Huenchula	She is the wife of Millalobo.
Meuler	A lizard who causes storms and hides underground when the storm is active.
Millalobo	He has the body of a seal, and a head of a combination of a human and a fish. He is covered in gold, thus the name, meaning "golden wolf". He controls the population and actions of most sea creatures. His three children are La Pincoya, La Sirena, and El Pincoy.
El Pincoy	With the body of a seal and head of a man, he helps carry out his father's commands.
La Pincoya	She influences the outcome of the day's fishing; fish won't appear if she faces the shore, and fish will come if she faces the sea.
La Sirena chilota	With the tail of a fish and the upper torso of a beautiful blonde teenage girl, she is responsible for the herding of fish and the guiding of drowned souls to Caleuche. The daughter of Millalobo, and thus the sister of Pincoy and Pincoya.
El Trauco	He "is aggressive to men" and arouses sexual desires in women. He is married to La Furia.
La Vaca Marina	La Vaca Marina: She lives in the sea, and is sexually attracted to bulls. When she sees one near the coast, she leaves the sea and seduces it, and returns to the sea with it.
La Viuda	She also arouses sexual desires in men. Unlike La Furia, she only kills the victim if he refuses to sleep with her.

== Legends and mythical creatures ==
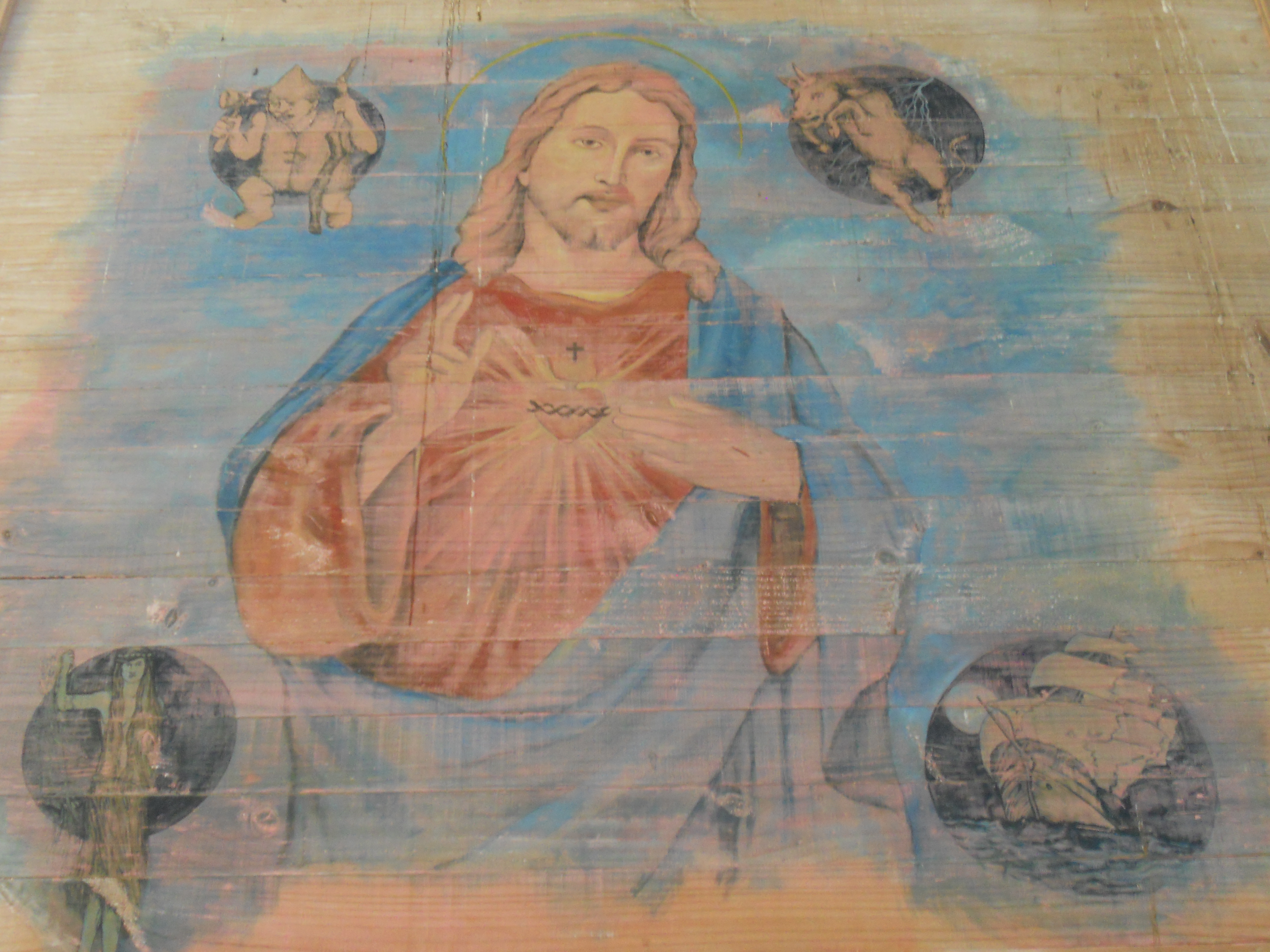
Icon in the church of Dalcahue: Christ being surrounded by mythological creatures of Chiloé

Myths and mythical creatures of Chiloé, in southern Chile include:

- The Basilisco Chilote (a type of Basilisk)
- The Brujo Chilote (a type of sorcerer)
- The Caballo marino chilote (a type of water horse)
- The Caleuche
- The Camahueto
- The Cape or Skin
- The Carbunclo
- The Chucao
- The Cuchivilu
- The Coñieuma (a double flower that screams as a child on new moon)
- The Fiura
- La Condená ("The Condemned")
- The macabre Invunche
- Chiloé (mythological origin). The legend of Ten ten Vilu, Coi coi Vilu and Origin of the Archipelago
- The Millalobo
- The Peuchen or Piguchen
- The Pésame
- The Pincoya, goddess of the Chiloean Seas
- The Pincoy
- The Sirena chilota (a type of Mermaid)
- The Trauco

== Media ==
The myths from Chiloe appear in The Luke Coles Book Series by Josh Walker, a Young Adult Urban Fantasy series where the myths form the base for much of the lore in the novels.

== See also ==
- Mapuche mythology
- Chilean mythology
- Chiloé
