= Trauco =

Humanoid creature in Chilota mythology

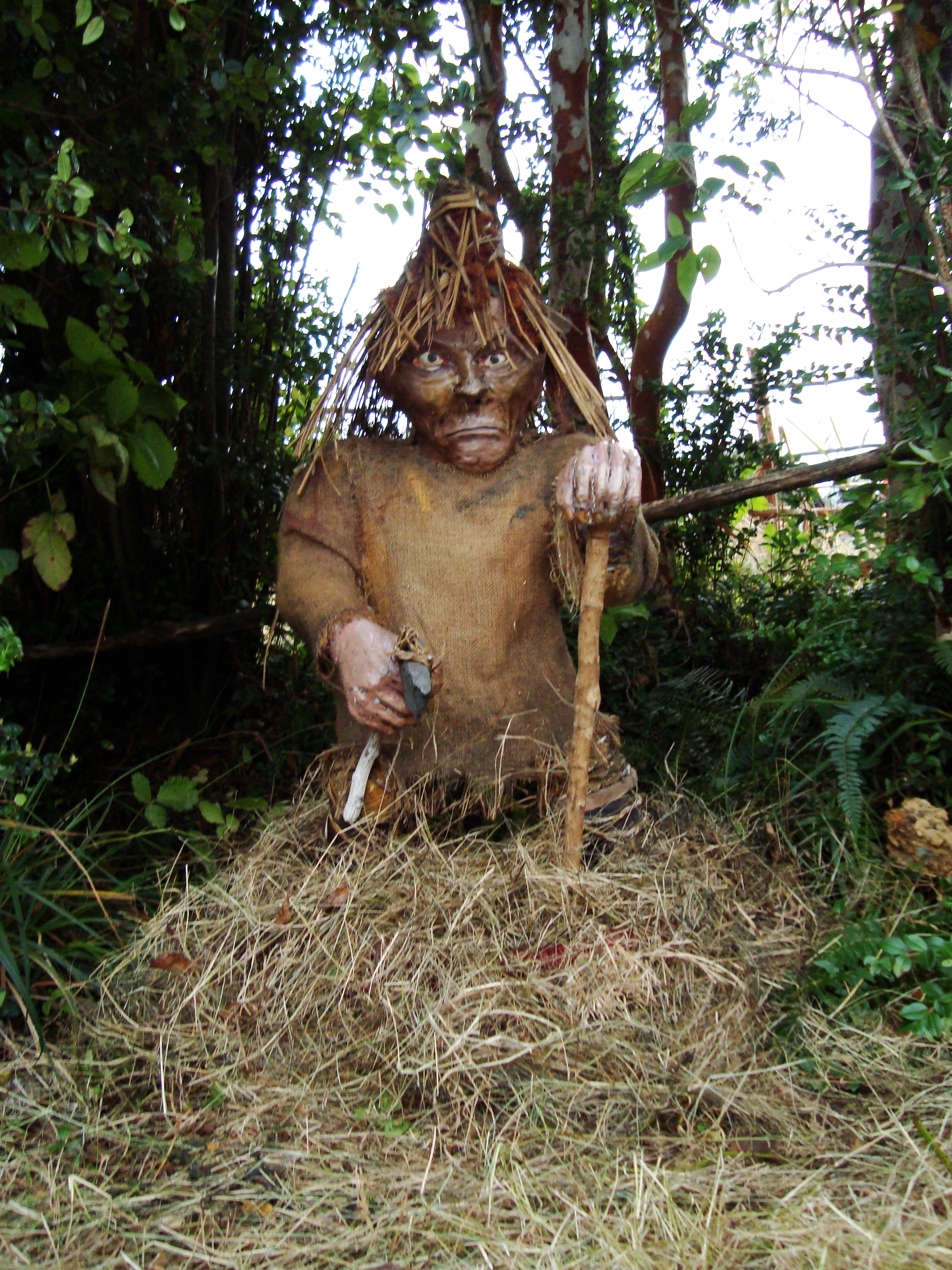
- Artist's representation of the Trauco

Creature information
- Folklore: Mythology

Origin
- Country: Chile
- Region: Chiloé Archipelago
- Details: Male sexually potent being that seduces and impregnates women

In the traditional Chilote mythology of Chiloé, Chile, the Trauco is a humanoid creature of small stature—similar to a dwarf or goblin—who lives deep in the forest. It has an ugly face and legs without feet.

== Legend ==
The Trauco is a mythical entity that inhabits the woods of Chiloé, an island in the south of Chile. It is a child of the snake god Coi Coi-Vilu. It has a powerful magnetism that attracts young and middle-aged women. According to myth, the Trauco's wife is the wicked and ugly Fiura. The Trauco carries a small stone-headed hatchet that he uses to strike trees in the forest to symbolize his sexual potency.

Upon being chosen by him, any woman—even if she is asleep—will go to the Trauco; bewitched and helpless against his sexual allure, she falls at his feet and proceeds to engage in sexual intercourse with him. Some men of Chiloé fear the Trauco, as they believe his gaze can be deadly.

When a single woman is pregnant and no one steps forward as the father, people assume that Trauco is the father. Because the creature is irresistible, the woman is considered blameless. The Trauco is sometimes invoked to explain sudden or unwanted pregnancies, especially in unmarried women.

== See also ==
- Pombero
- Incubus
- Lists of humanoids
- Chilean mythology
- Little people (mythology)
