= Kalku =

Person who practices evil or black magic in the Mapuche cosmogony

Kalku or Calcu, in Mapuche mythology, is a sorcerer or witch who works with black magic and negative powers or forces. The essentially benevolent shamans are more often referred to as machi, to avoid confusion with the malevolent kalku. Its origins are in Mapuche tradition.

The word kalku is a borrowing from Puquina language. Its adoption by Mapuches fits into a pattern of parallels in the Mapuche and Central Andean cosmology (Inca religion) dating back to the times of Tiwanaku Empire when Puquina was an important language.

== Description ==
The kalku is a semi-mythical character that has the power of working with wekufe "spirits or wicked creatures". An example of a wekufe is the Nguruvilu. The kalku also have as servants other beings such as the Anchimayen, or the Chonchon (which is the magical manifestation of the more powerful kalku).

A mapuche kalku is usually an inherited role, although it could be a machi that is interested in lucrative ends or a "less powerful", frustrated machi who ignores the laws of the admapu (the rules of the Mapuches).

== In popular culture ==
Kalku is the main antagonist of 2020 Annecy nominated Chilean-Brazilian featured animated film Nahuel and the Magic Book created by Carburadores and German Acuna.

== See also ==
- Cacique
- Warlock of Chiloé
