= Pombero =

Legendary monster from South America

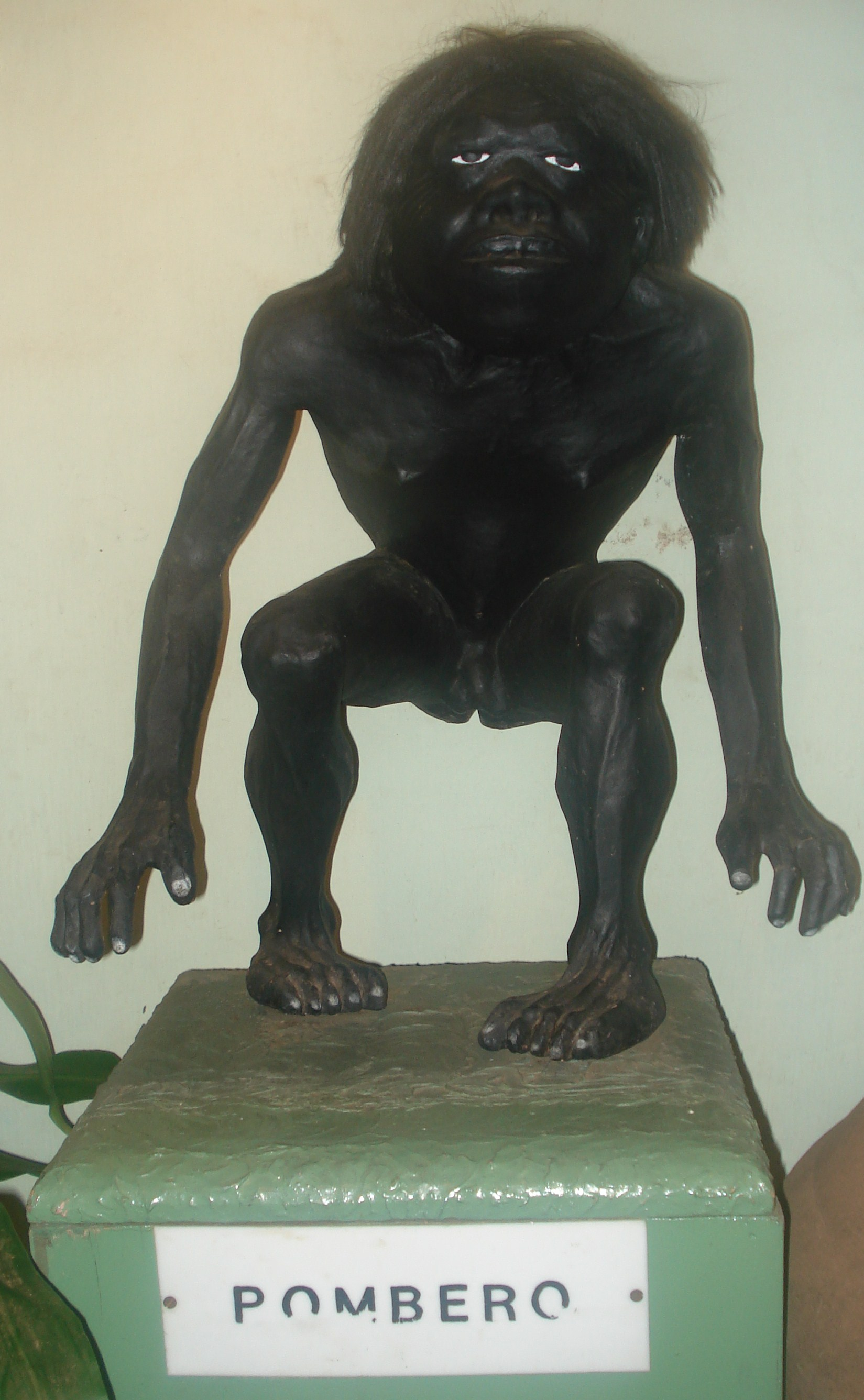
Statue of Pombero

The Pombero (Guarani: Pombéro) known also as Pomberito, Pyrague ("hairy feet"), Karai Pyhare ("lord of the night"), Kuarahy Jára ("master of the sun") is a mythological being typical of Paraguay's cultural heritage. Also known in the mythology of the Mbyá tribe of southern Brazil and the Argentinian province of (Misiones) and Cho Pombé ("Don Pombero"), it is a mythical humanoid creature of small stature in Guarani mythology. The legend, along with those of other mythological figures of the Guarani, is an important part of the culture of a region stretching from northeast Argentina northward through the whole of Paraguay and into southern Brazil. The Pombéro is said to capture particularly ungrateful girls, force them to kiss him, and later rape them.

== Name and appearance ==
Pombero's original name in the Guaraní language is Karai Pyhare, lit. "The man of the Night", he is said to be a primarily nocturnal creature. In some parts of Argentina he is known primarily by the Spanish translation of his name, Señor de la noche.

Although accounts of the Pombero's appearance and nature vary slightly from one community to the next, he is usually described as being short and ugly, with very short arms and hairy hands and feet. His hairy feet are said to give him the ability to sneak up on people silently and the touch of his hairy hands to bring a cold shiver. The Pombero generally dwells in rural areas, living in the forest, although he will sometimes choose to inhabit an abandoned house, deserted rooms within an occupied home, or even empty barns.

As a forest dweller, the Pombero is said to be able to imitate the sounds of various forest creatures. Most specifically it is believed that the Pombero can imitate birdsong, especially those of a nocturnal variety, and as such is viewed as something of a protector of the birds. Many witnesses of the Pombero say that before he appears he whistles. Most are so frightened of gathering his wrath that they never whistle again. One common aspect of the myth among various Guaraní based societies is that the Pombero protects the birds from children who hunt them with slingshots.

The Pombero is generally viewed as a harmless troublemaker. Owing to his preferred habitat of rural forests, the targets of his mischief tend to be rural farmers. Among his favourite activities are setting loose cattle, stealing eggs, chicken and honey, frightening horses and causing them to throw their riders off, as well as scattering corn, rice, or other provisions. The Pombero is also often accused of impregnating single women either by a mere touch of his hand or by tricking them into having sex with him, and it is said that babies who are born ugly and hairy are likely the result of a visit from the Pombero. Another character from Guaraní mythology, Kurupi, is blamed in a similar manner for unexpected or unexplained pregnancies. The Pombero is difficult, if not impossible, to detect due to his silent movements as well as other supernatural abilities, such as being able to turn invisible, squeeze through impossibly narrow spaces, or other such feats.

It is said that one can keep the Pombero from engaging in such mischief by leaving gifts out for him, most specifically cigars and rum, though honey is also an acceptable offering. Thus appeased, the Pombero will abstain from wreaking havoc upon one's home and possessions. In some areas it is believed that repeated giving of these gifts can cause the Pombero to become friendly, to the point where he will guard over one's home, animals, and possessions, and sometimes even leave gifts in return.

The Pombero tends to be the most widespread and pervasive of mythological figures among Guaraní speaking cultures today. In rural Paraguay, for example, it is not uncommon for adults to fervently believe in this myth, to the extent that they leave gifts of rum and cigars for the Pombero nightly.

== Pombero in popular culture ==
The Pombero myth has been studied in a documentary program on paranormal themes (especially cryptozoology) of the Sci-Fi channel called Destination Truth, in chapter 6 of its first season entitled «El Luisón/El Pombero».

The album "Sr. Pombero" (Mr. Pombero) of the Kchiporros band bases his name on this character.

In November 2020, Paraguayan game developer Inside Studios launched the video game "Pombero – The Lord of Night", receiving mixed criticism.

== See also ==
- Trauco
- Kurupi
- Jasy Jatere
- Pom-Bear
