= Warlocks of Chiloé =

Beings in Chilote mythology

The warlocks of Chiloé ("brujos de Chiloé" or "brujos chilotes" in the Spanish language) are people of Chiloé Archipelago said to practise witchcraft linked to Chilote mythology. The source of their witchcraft is often attributed to a legendary encounter between Basque navigator José de Moraleda y Montero and Huilliche machi Chillpila. Chillpila is said to have defeated Moraleda in a duel of witchcraft, obtaining a book of European magic as reward. Belief in witchcraft was common in the archipelago, reaching such influence that in 1880 Chilean authorities put warlocks on trial who they claimed ruled the archipelago through a secret society.

== Legend ==
Popular belief has attributed to the sorcerers of Chiloé a complex organization, the help of magical creatures, and numerous powers and weaknesses.

The warlocks are said to have had a secret society called La Recta Provincia or La Mayoria. Its origins date back to the Chilean colonial period, when navigator José de Moraleda visited Chiloé in 1786.

According to legend, José de Moraleda y Montero challenged the power of the machi Chilpilla to a "magic" competition. Moraleda was defeated, and Chilpilla ran his ship aground when he tried to leave the island. Accepting his defeat, Moraleda gave Chilpilla a magic book, from which some indigenous people (among them, Machis and Kalkus) would be instructed. This fact led to the union of indigenous rituals and practices with the knowledge described in the given book, which would give rise to the secret society.

Moraleda does not mention in his report having met the "sorceress" Chillpila, but he does mention the fact that he wanted to make contact with a machi.

The jurisdiction of La Recta Provincia extended throughout the Archipelago and was headed by a King, who together with other subordinates formed a governing council. There were seven Districts or Republics with code names taken from places in Spain and its colonies: Buenos Aires (Achao), España (Queilén and its surroundings), Lima (Quicaví), Peru (Caucahué), Salamanca (Rauco), Santiago (Tenaún) and Villarrica (Dalcahue).

The seat of the King was in the Cueva de Quicaví or Casa Grande, in the surroundings of Quicaví, in the commune of Quemchi. According to legend, the society worked out of a cave that was guarded by a deformed being, the Imbunche. There they kept the book, the Levisterio or Revisorio, an instrument they used to take various exams, and the Chayanco, used to monitor all members of the witch community. This cave measured approximately 200 meters long by 3 meters high and contained many rooms lit by torches and jugs of human oil, according to Judit Inzunza.

== Abilities and weaknesses ==
The warlocks are said to be able to fly using a macuñ (made from the skin of a dead virgin's chest), to turn into certain animals and fireballs, and to tirar males (inflict harm from a distance). Their knowledge of plants and animals also enable them to brew powerful potions. They are said to be able to tame the Caballo marino chilote (Chilote hippocampus) and safely board the legendary ghost ship the Caleuche.

They are said to be weak to salt.

== Related works ==
There is currently a character in Chile known as El Brujo, which originally appeared in the Caleuche Comic magazine and now appears in the pages of the magazine Heroes. El Brujo is a rather loose and self-centered superhero, whose powers and abilities are based on Chiloe witchcraft. Here, the macuñ a cape, and the Brujo's allies are an invunche - contrary to the legend, a very intelligent being, the result of being a failed experiment; and a voladora (which similarly, contrary to the legend, is young and beautiful, for the same reason).

In 2014, the Chilean visual artist Patricio Paretti made the animated television series "Magallanes, un cuento mágico", aired by UMAGTV, which had as its central character "Don Eleuterio", a Chiloe warlock who lived in Punta Arenas and who told supernatural stories that happened in Chilean Patagonia. The audiovisual work was inspired by various local beliefs, mainly myths, legends and witchcraft from the Big Island of Chiloé . In one of the episodes, "The bowels of death", a witch uses a macuñ or magic breastplate both to fly, to become bad light, as well as to become an animal. The macuñ is shown as a stylized piece of leather similar to a corset, made with baby skin and horsehair threads. The same episode makes mention of hexes with cemetery land, a vital element for the realization of black magic by sorcerers.

In Swamp Thing, volumes 3 and 4, John Constantine joins Alec to battle the Chiloté brujeria who are trying to end civilization by raising a great evil.
