= Alicanto =

Bird from Chilean mythology

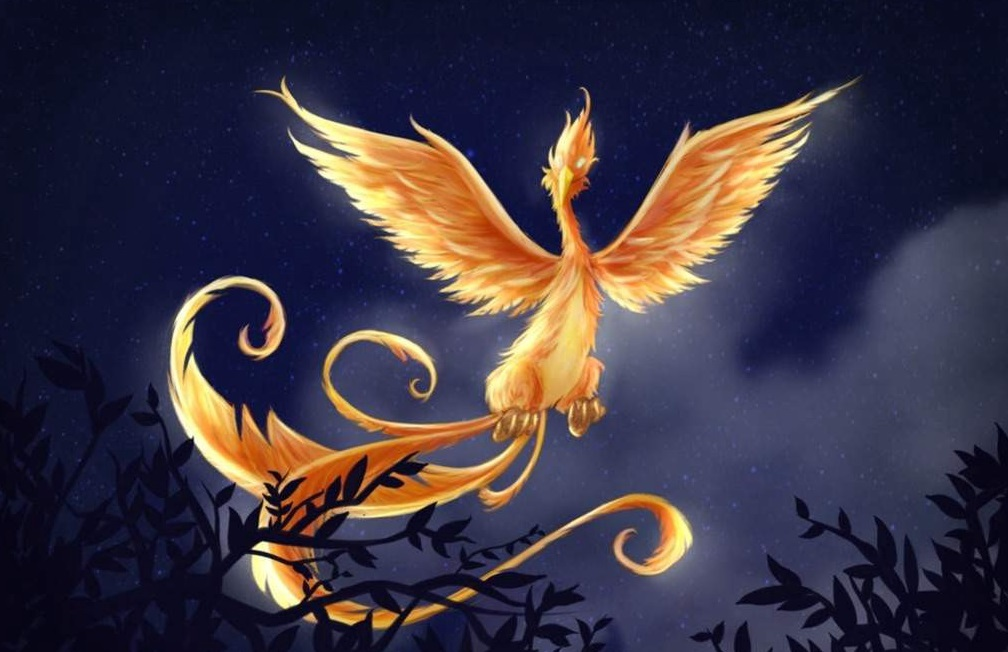
Modern representation of a golden Alicanto.

The alicanto, in Chilean mythology, is a nocturnal flightless bird of the Atacama desert, which is said to run at night with glowing outspread wings, glittering in the gold or silver color deriving from the precious ores it supposedly eats. Some say it has strangely shining eyes. If the bird can be successfully detected without being noticed, it will lead the miner or prospector to a mother lode of gold or silver. But if the bird detects a human, it is said to extinguish its illumination, then disappear into darkness, or worse, lead the human to a perilous fall from a precipice.

== Sources ==
An account of the alicanto was published by folklorist Julio Vicuña Cifuentes in 1914/1915. A similar description can be found paraphrased in the English-translated version of Book of Imaginary Beings (1969) by Argentine author Jorge Luis Borges, under the chapter of "Fauna of Chile", which was one of four chapters not found in the original Spanish version by Borges but expanded in the English translation. (Note: Hurley's new 2006 translation does not have the "Fauna of Chile" chapter, which he explains is one of the 4 expanded chapters, i.e., there were no Spanish originals for him to use. Hurley imagined Borges was in possession of the lore of the Chilean fauna, but had not ascertained Borges source (to be Vicuña or anyone else).)

== Legend ==
The alicanto was a legendary bird of the Atacama desert of Chile. Legend says that the alicanto's wings shine at night with beautiful metallic colors, and their eyes emit strange lights. The color of the wings may indicate the type of ore it eats, golden if from a gold mine and silvery if from a silver mine. Some descriptions also portray the color of the wings as copper-green. Also the cave-dwelling alicanto female will lay just two eggs, of gold or silver, depending on the ore it feeds on (lore of Santiago).

The bird runs on the ground with its wings outspread, since it cannot fly. This is not due to any deficiency in the wings which function normally; its flightlessness is due to the massive amount of ore it eats that sits in its crop and loads it down. This means that it runs faster if it has not eaten recently. According to legend, a miner or treasure-seeker who follows an alicanto without being noticed by the bird can find rich mineral outcrops or treasures such as an entierro. Its wings light up, and wherever it perches will be the deposit of treasure for the prospector to find (lore of San Bernardo).

But when it notices a human in pursuit, the alicanto (according to the lore of Talagante Province) will turn off the shining of its wings, and scuttle away in the darkness of the night. If the pursuer is not careful, the alicanto may lure the miner off a cliff (or chasm). (Note: Vicuña states "towards some precipice hacia algún precipicio", but Borges (1969), Eng. tr. gives "draw its pursuers toward a chasm".) The miner will not see the cliff in time because of the "intensity of the darkness". (Note: Spanish: "densidad de las sombras".) It is said that it was an alicanto that guided Juan Godoy to the rich silver outcrops of Chañarcillo on May 16, 1832, sparking the Chilean silver rush.
