= Pincoya =

Chilote legendary creature

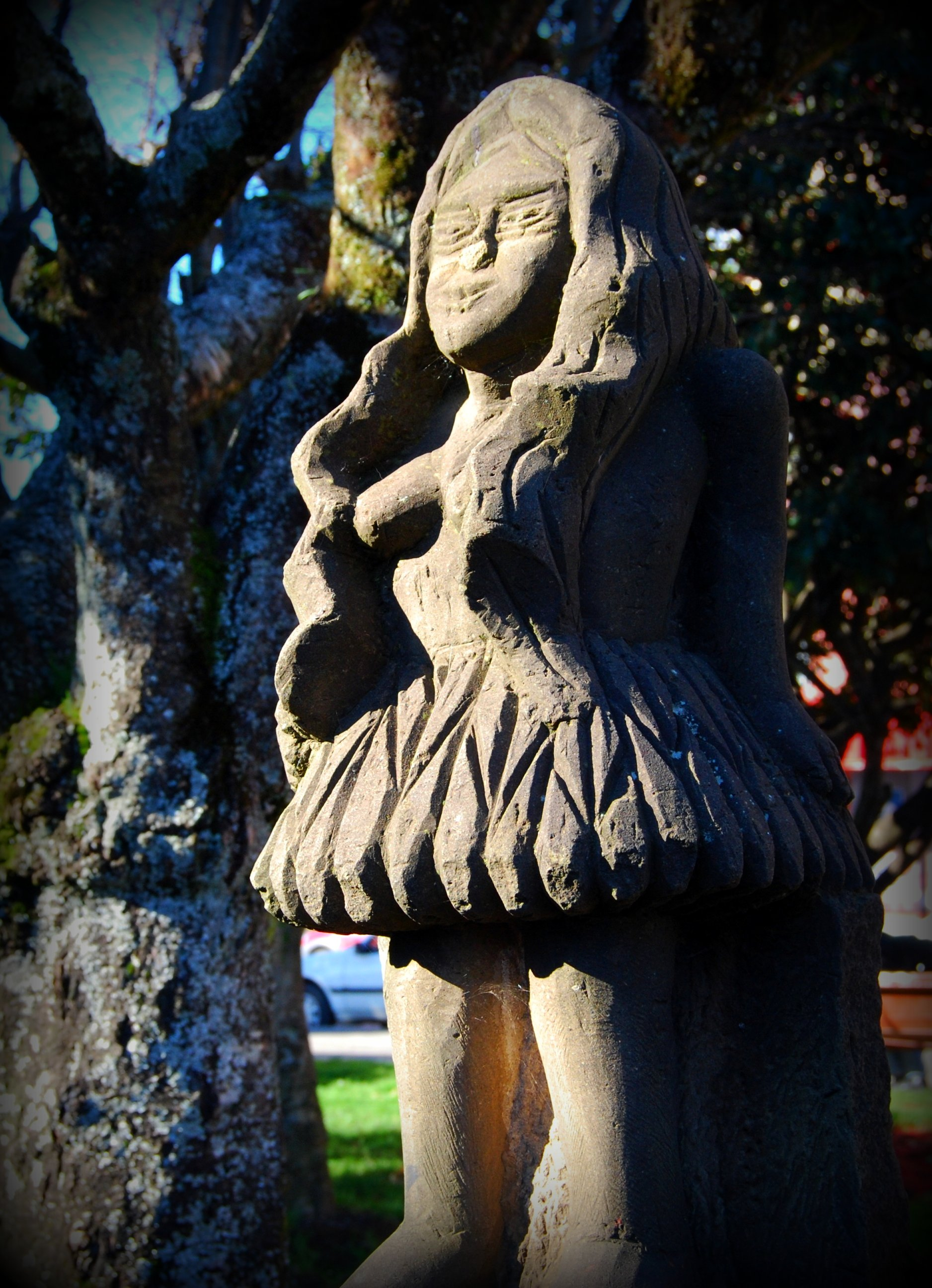
Pincoya statue

The Pincoya is, according to local mythology, a female "water spirit" of the Chilotan Seas. The Pincoya is said to have long blond hair, be of incomparable beauty, be cheerful and sensual, and rise from the depths of the sea.

== Legends ==
Spanish article about the Pincoya from the Enciclopedia Chilena project, done by the Library of Congress of Chile

Naked and pure, she personifies the fertility of marine species. Through her ritual dance she provides the chilote (resident of Chiloé) with an abundance or deficiency of fish and seafood. If she performs her dance facing the sea, it means that these shores will have an abundance of fish. When she dances facing the mountains, her back to the sea, seafood will be scarce. Chiloean mythology is appreciative of the Pincoya, believed to be good, beautiful and humanitarian. According to other legends, Pincoya is the daughter of Millalobo (king of sea, in chilote mythology) and the human Huenchula. Her sister is the Sirena chilota (a type of Mermaid) and her brother is Pincoy (who also is her husband). The three siblings lead and guide the drowned sailors onto a large phantom ship, the Caleuche, sailing the seas at night around the southern island of Chiloé in southern Chile. The ship appears briefly intact with sounds of a party on board, but quickly vanishes. Myth has it that, once on board, the dead can resume an existence as if they were alive again.

== Media ==
- The Pincoya is mentioned (along with this article) in Marisha Pessl's Night Film: A Novel.
- The Pincoya is a playable character in the roguelike platform action-adventure game Abyss Odyssey.
- Pincoya is the nickname of Jennifer Galvarini, who is one of the participants of the Chilean version of the reality show "Big Brother" (Gran Hermano, Chilevision, 2023)

== Scientific name use ==
In 2013, the newly discovered Pincoya Storm Petrel (Oceanites pincoyae) was named after Pincoya.

In 2019, star HD 164604 was officially named Pincoya after a poll organized by the NameExoWorlds campaign in Chile, during the 100th anniversary of the IAU.
