= Camahueto =

Legendary creature from Chilote mythology

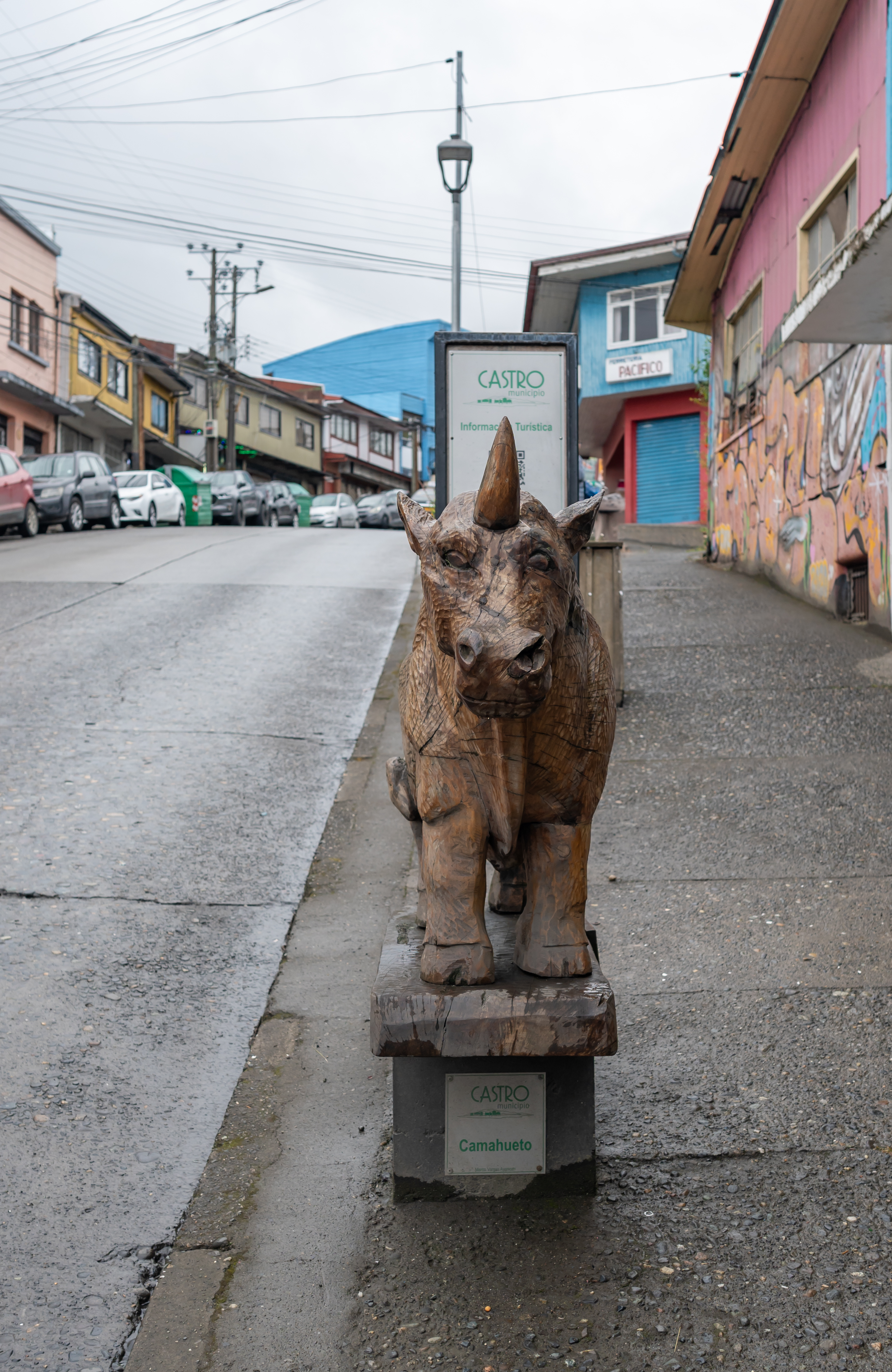
- Camahueto sculpture

Creature information
- Similar entities: Unicorn
- Folklore: Mythology

Origin
- Country: Chile
- Region: Chiloé Archipelago

The Camahueto is a legendary bull found in Chilote mythology. Originating in the Chiloé Archipelago, the bull was said to have a single horn on its forehead, similar to a unicorn's.

== Legends ==
The Camahueto is said to grow within rivers, moving to the ocean when they are fully grown. The exact nature of the creature varies within folklore, but it is variously said to eat humans, control time and create rain or thunder at will. Characterised as a destructive animal, the Camahueto is said to destroys all crops and capture all creatures it comes across when it travels on land. Legends tell of humans being dragged into the depths of the sea by the Camahueto when they cross its path, or approach its resting place.

According to legend, the only way to rid yourself of a Camahueto is to call for the aid of a machi, or witch, who can lead the animal back to sea using a lasso made of kelp.
