= Machi (shaman) =

Spiritual leader and healer in Mapuche culture

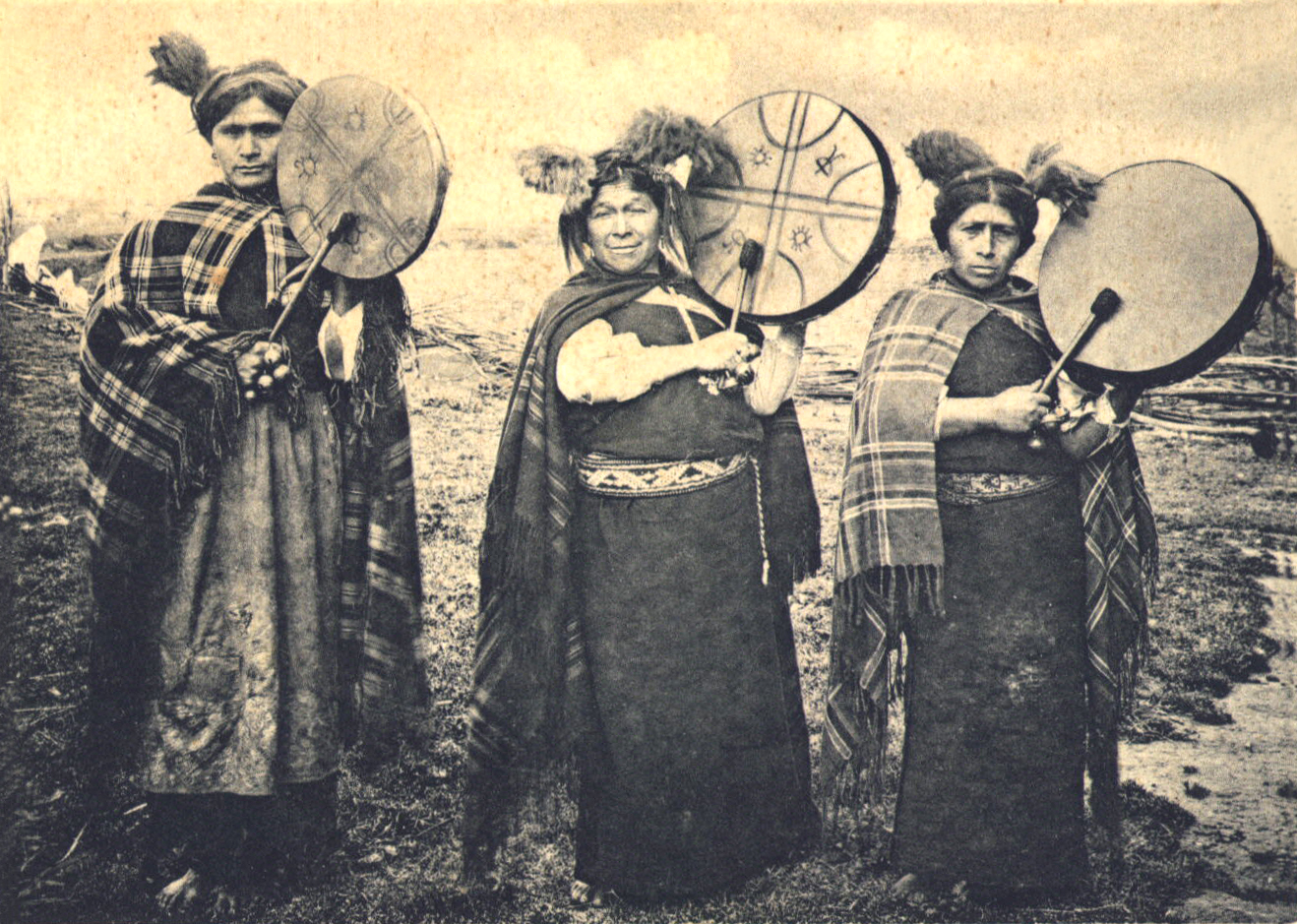
Mapuche machis in 1903

A machi is a traditional healer and religious leader in the Mapuche culture of Chile and Argentina. Machis play significant roles in Mapuche religion. In contemporary Mapuche culture, women are more commonly machis than men, but it is not a rule. Male machi are known as Machi Weye.

== Description ==
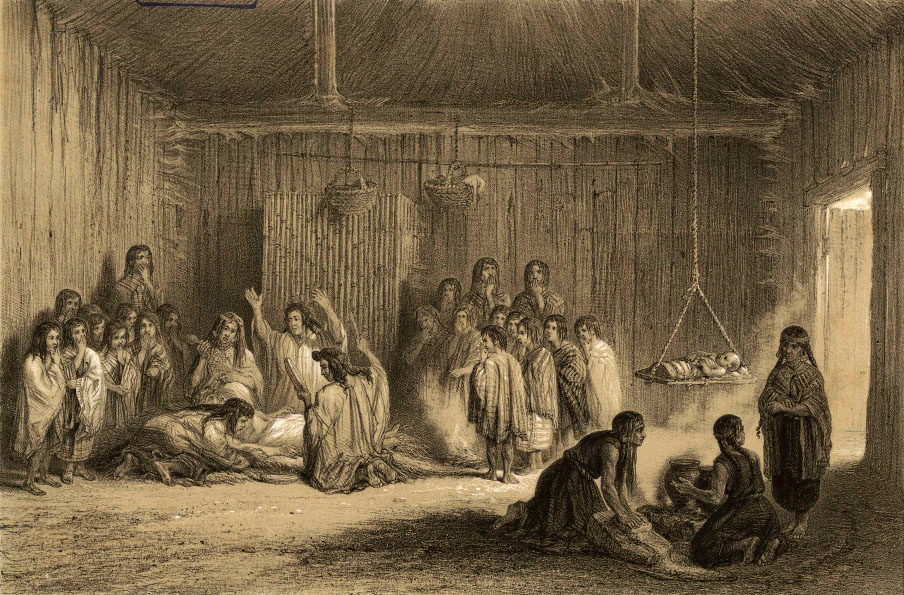
Illustration of a machi healing a patient, from Atlas of Physical and Political History of Chile (Atlas de la historia física y política de Chile), by Claudio Gay

The Mapuche live in southern South America, mostly in central Chile (Araucanía and Los Lagos) and the adjacent areas of Argentina. As a religious authority within Mapuche culture, a machi leads healing ceremonies called Machitun. During the machitun, the machi communicates with the spirit world. Machis also serve as advisors and oracles for their community; in the past, they advised on peace and warfare. The term machi is sometimes interchangeable with the word kalku. Kalku usually has an evil connotation, whereas machi is usually considered good. This is not always the case, however, as the terms may be interchanged in common use.

To become a machi, a Mapuche person has to demonstrate character, willpower, and courage, because initiation is long and painful. A person is usually selected in infancy, based upon the following:

- premonitory dreams
- supernatural revelations
- influence of the family
- inheritance
- her or his power of healing disease
- own initiative

Machiluwun is the ceremony to consecrate a new machi. The chosen child will live six months with a dedicated machi, where he or she learns the skills to serve as a machi.

== Role in Mapuche medicine ==
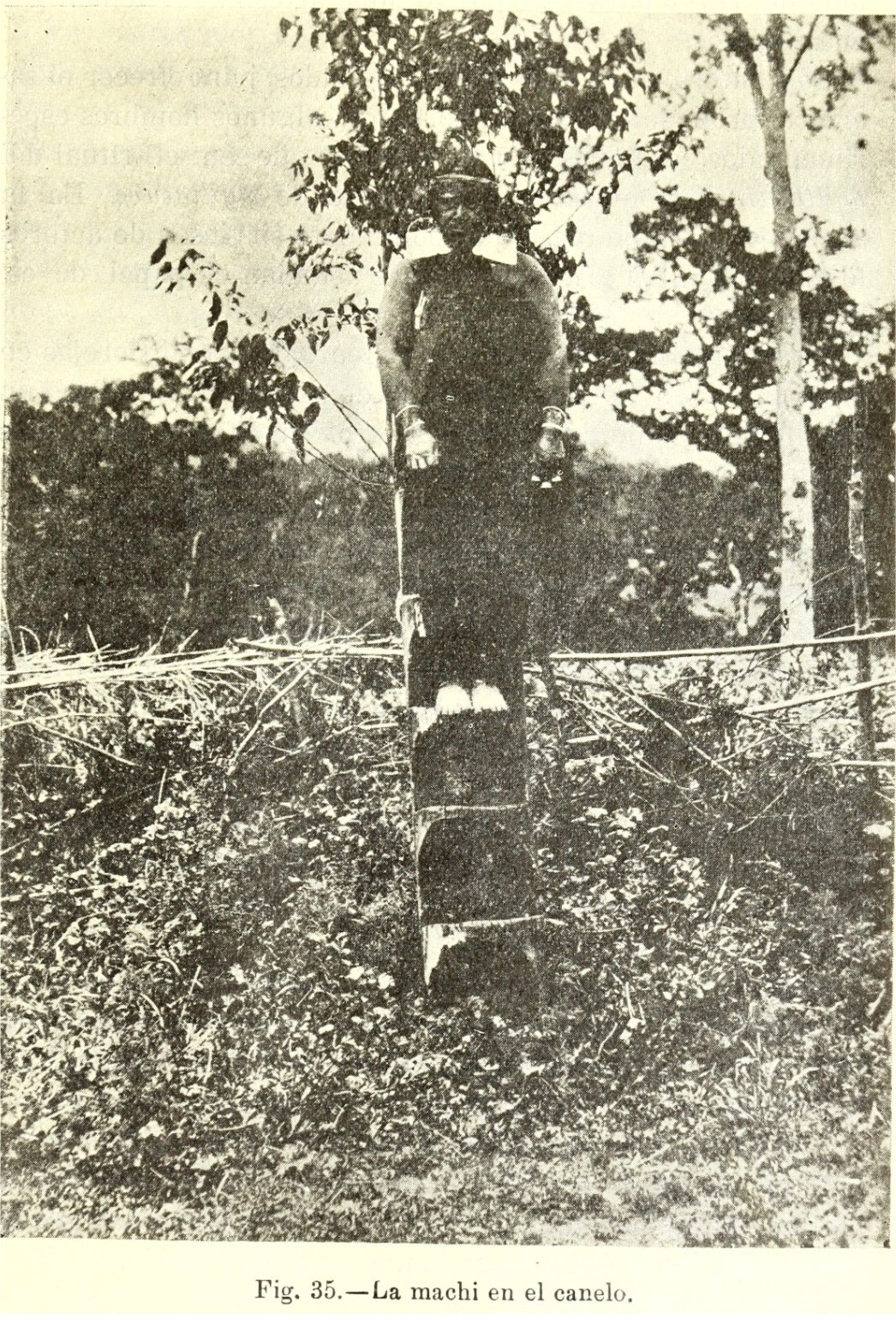
An Araucan/Mapuche machi

The machi is a person of great wisdom and healing power, and is the main character of Mapuche medicine. Machis have detailed knowledge of medicinal herbs and other remedies, and are said to have the power of the spirits. In addition, it is claimed that machis have the ability to interpret dreams, called pewma in Mapudungun. Machis are also said to help communities identify individuals who are using supernatural powers to do harm. Allegedly, Mapuche traditional medicine is gaining more acceptance within broader Chilean society.

== Gender ==
Becoming a machi is a spiritual transformation that also fosters a place where people can flow between spectrums of gender. Within machi rituals and ceremonies, gender is fluid and dynamic. The majority of machi are female, but males can also be machis; the machi power is said to usually be passed down from the maternal grandmother. Gender is not determined by sex, as it typically is in Chilean society, but rather by identity and spirituality, and is ambiguous among machi. Some scholars have coined this as "cogender," which is a partly feminine and partly masculine identity. Most of this research has focused on males and femininity versus females and masculinity, but all forms of gender fluidity are present within machi culture. During some ceremonies, gender is transcended and transformed spiritually, where binaries between genders do not exist and new gender identities are explored.

Within Mapuche culture, plants and spirits are given gender; these assigned genders are usually based upon perceptions of masculinity and femininity. As examples, Laurel is a feminine plant because it is regarded as soothing and soft, whereas Triwe is masculine because it has protective powers. These genders are fixed and do not change; machi, however, transcend static gender and dynamically flow between them. During healing ceremonies, machis can flow between male, female, and cogendered identities in order to balance the spirit of the person they are healing. As Shamans of the Foye Tree says, “Gender of spirits remain[s] permanent, whereas machi move between gender identities." This is because, in machi cosmology, the Nguchen, or the giver of life, is balanced by four identities: the man, the woman, the young man, and the young woman. During ceremonies, machis seek to embody some or all of these identities at different times in order to perform healing. When someone is sick, machis believe it is because the four identities are out of balance. Within Mapuche culture, there are “well defined notions of gender, but Machis are able to manipulate them." To the machi, gender exists in two realities that they are able to flow between freely: the earthly where gender is fixed, and the spiritual where gender is fluid.

=== Gender roles and discrimination ===
The gender identity and construction of the machi is nuanced and complex. Gender in machi culture is filled with contradictions, paradoxes, and complications because they simultaneously exist within the gender binary while also defying it. “Whereas male machi legitimate their sexuality as celibate priests, most female machi gain status and virtue by marrying and having children." Thus, machi still abide by gender roles and norms of Mapuche culture, but during spiritual ceremonies and rituals they challenge traditional roles and perceptions of gender, and embrace cogendered identities. Machi are perceived to fluidly move between genders throughout different ceremonies, but then face discrimination from Chilean society and fellow Mapuche themselves. While machis accept many different and even conflicting identities, Chilean society often does not. Homophobia and transphobia are rampant in Chilean and Mapuche culture, and machi who do not fit into traditional gender roles may face discrimination and transphobia. One machi states, “People [here] don’t talk much about homosexuality because it is looked down upon." The machis are respected, but also shunned - machi women are not viewed fully as women by Mapuche society because of their "masculine power," and machi men are not viewed fully as male because of their "femininity."

Although machi women are sometimes cast-out from traditional Mapuche gender roles, they are also simultaneously feared and revered. Masculine female machi are called derogatory terms such as bruja (witch), mujer de la calle (woman of the street), or marica (derogatory term of homosexual). One machi describes that machi women are given a higher status than other Mapuche women because “they are sent here by god” and are therefore divine. An example of this would be the machi being served before others at meals.

As a result of the gendered perception that machis are usually female, many male machi face discrimination from fellow Mapuche and Chilean society as a whole. Machismo in Chilean society plays a large role in such discrimination, as men are ostracized from groups because they are seen as “too feminine." Many male machi dress in women’s clothing, as this is perceived to be more pious and connected to nature. Since they do not fit conventional gender stereotypes, these feminine male machis are made outcasts and called derogatory names. As a result, many male machi have reinvented themselves as “celibate priests” or “spiritual warriors” in order to avoid further criticism and protect their masculinity. One Mapuche says that, although he discriminates against machi men, “when [he] is sick, when [he] needs a ngillatun, [he] goes begging to the male machi." Another Mapuche states, “They [male machi] may be stronger, but they wear women’s clothes...He must like pigs legs."

Both male and female machi face discrimination, but gendered stereotypes also create complicated power dynamics in which some circles perceive female machi as more powerful than male machi, and others vice-versa. To some, male machis are perceived as weak for taking feminized roles, but are simultaneously regarded as more powerful than female machis due to traditional gender stereotypes of women being inherently weaker. Yet, some view males as “not possessing as many powers as the [female] machis” because “females are more connected to nature." Male machis are not permitted to participate in some healing ceremonies and rituals, because “they are not close enough to nature” and “[women] are more patient with the sick and know more about herbs…the spirits get along with women better."

Some Machis are concerned about the way the West portrays them, afraid that they are only perceived as homosexuals or brujas (“witches”). One machi states, “Why do anthropologists always say who we are? Why don’t they ask us?” Ana Bacigalupo, a distinguished anthropologist in the field of machi gender roles, urges people to see the nuances in machi gender identity and allow complexity to exist.” According to Bacigalupo, the gendered identities and practices of machis can be experienced and interpreted endlessly along different paths and for different purposes that simultaneously bind people together and draw them apart.”

== Controversy ==
A modern ritual human sacrifice occurred during the devastating earthquake and tsunami of 1960 by a machi of the Mapuche in the Lago Budi community. The victim, five-year-old José Luis Painecur, had his arms and legs removed by Juan Pañán and Juan José Painecur (the victim's grandfather), and was stuck into the sand of the beach like a stake. The waters of the Pacific Ocean then carried the body out to sea. The sacrifice was rumored to be at the behest of the local machi, Juana Namuncurá Añen. The two men were charged with the crime and confessed, but later recanted. They were released after two years. A judge ruled that those involved in these events had "acted without free will, driven by an irresistible natural force of ancestral tradition." The arrested men's explanation was: "We were asking for calm in the sea and on the earth."

== See also ==
- Kalku
- Kallawaya
- Medicine man
- Lonko
- Toqui
- Warlock of Chiloé
- Francisca Linconao
