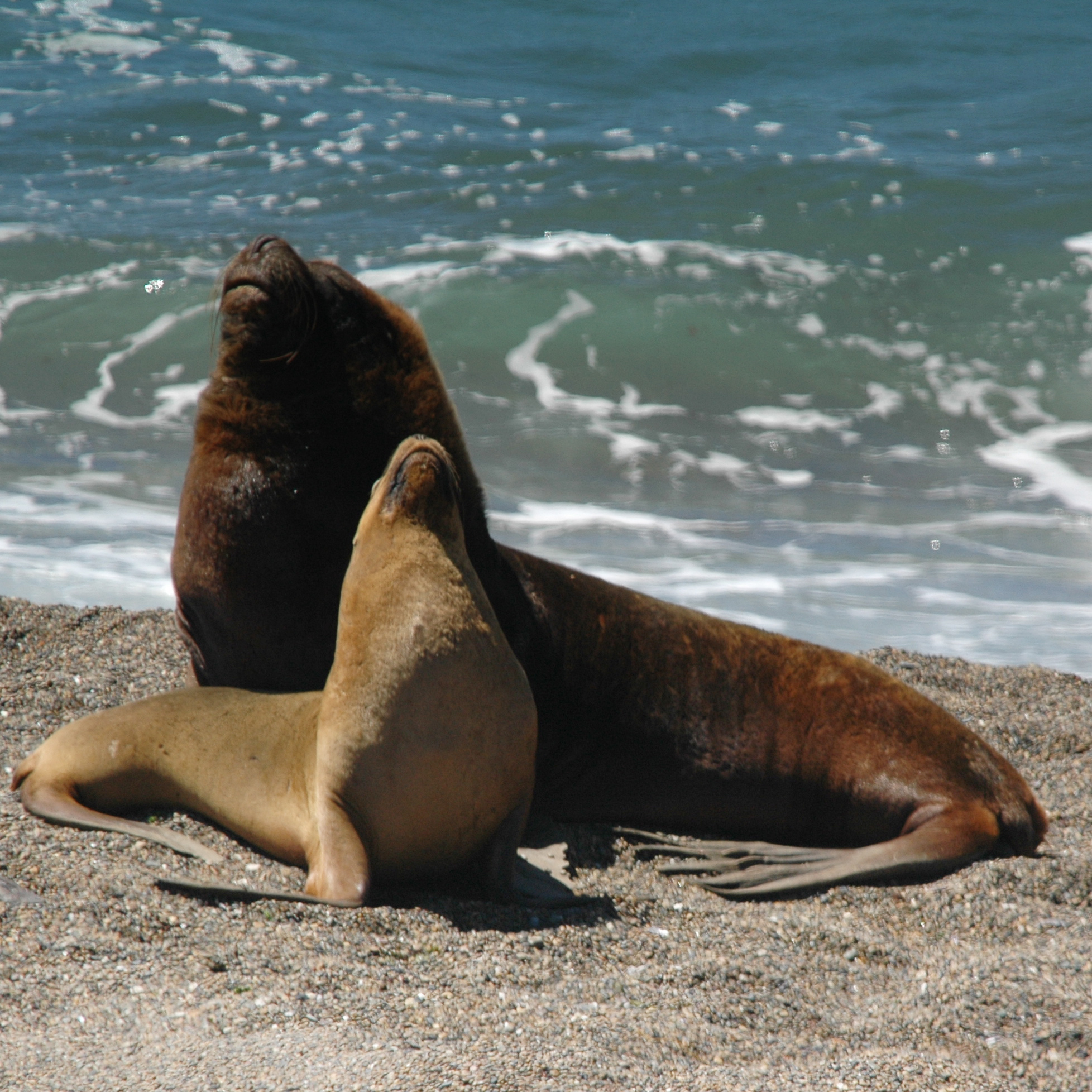
- Male and female

Conservation status
- Least Concern (IUCN 3.1)

Scientific classification
- Kingdom: Animalia
- Phylum: Chordata
- Class: Mammalia
- Infraclass: Placentalia
- Order: Carnivora
- Parvorder: Pinnipedia
- Family: Otariidae
- Genus: Otaria; Péron, 1816
- Species: O. flavescens

Binomial name
- Otaria flavescens (Shaw, 1800)
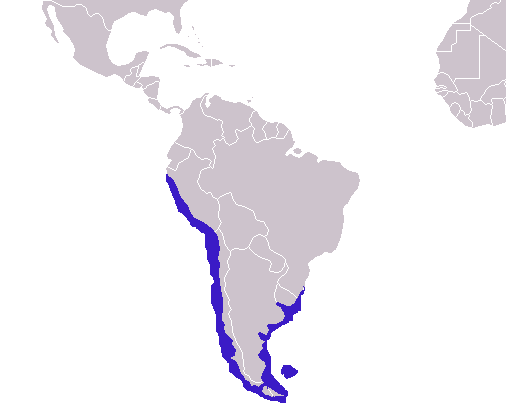
- South American sea lion range

Synonyms
- Otaria bryonia

= South American sea lion =

Species of carnivore

The South American sea lion (Otaria flavescens, formerly Otaria byronia), also called the southern sea lion and the Patagonian sea lion, is a sea lion found on the western and southeastern coasts of South America. It is the only extant member of the genus Otaria, which also includes the extinct Otaria josefinae. The species is highly sexually dimorphic. Males have a large head and prominent mane. They mainly feed on fish and cephalopods and haul out on sand, gravel, rocky, or pebble beaches. Breeding males typically defend both territories and individual females, though this can vary. Less dominant males may try to achieve success by causing chaos in the group. The overall population of the species is considered stable, estimated at 265,000 animals.

== Naming ==
The South American sea lion was classified as Phoca flavescens by George Shaw in 1800 and as Otaria byronia by Henri Marie Ducrotay de Blainville in 1820. The two nomenclatures were historically used interchangeably, but O. flavescens has become the preferred name. The species is also known by the common name "southern sea lion", although it is not preferred since the Australian sea lion and New Zealand sea lion also range in the Southern Hemisphere. Locally, it is known by several names, including león marino (sea lion) and lobo marino (sea wolf).

== Description ==
The South American sea lion is among the largest of and most sexually dimorphic of the eared seals. Males measure up to 3 m (9.8 ft) in length with a weight of 350 kg (770 lb) while females reach a length 2 m (6 ft 7 in) and reach 150 kg (330 lb) in weight. Pups are born 0.86 m (2 ft 10 in) long and weigh 12–15 kg (26–33 lb). Size differences between the sexes exists in both newborns and juveniles.

Adult males have large heads with short, upturned snouts and long manes which reach the shoulders. The fur is mainly brownish with adult males being dark brown and females being nearly yellowish. Pups are born black but become reddish-brown after their first molt.

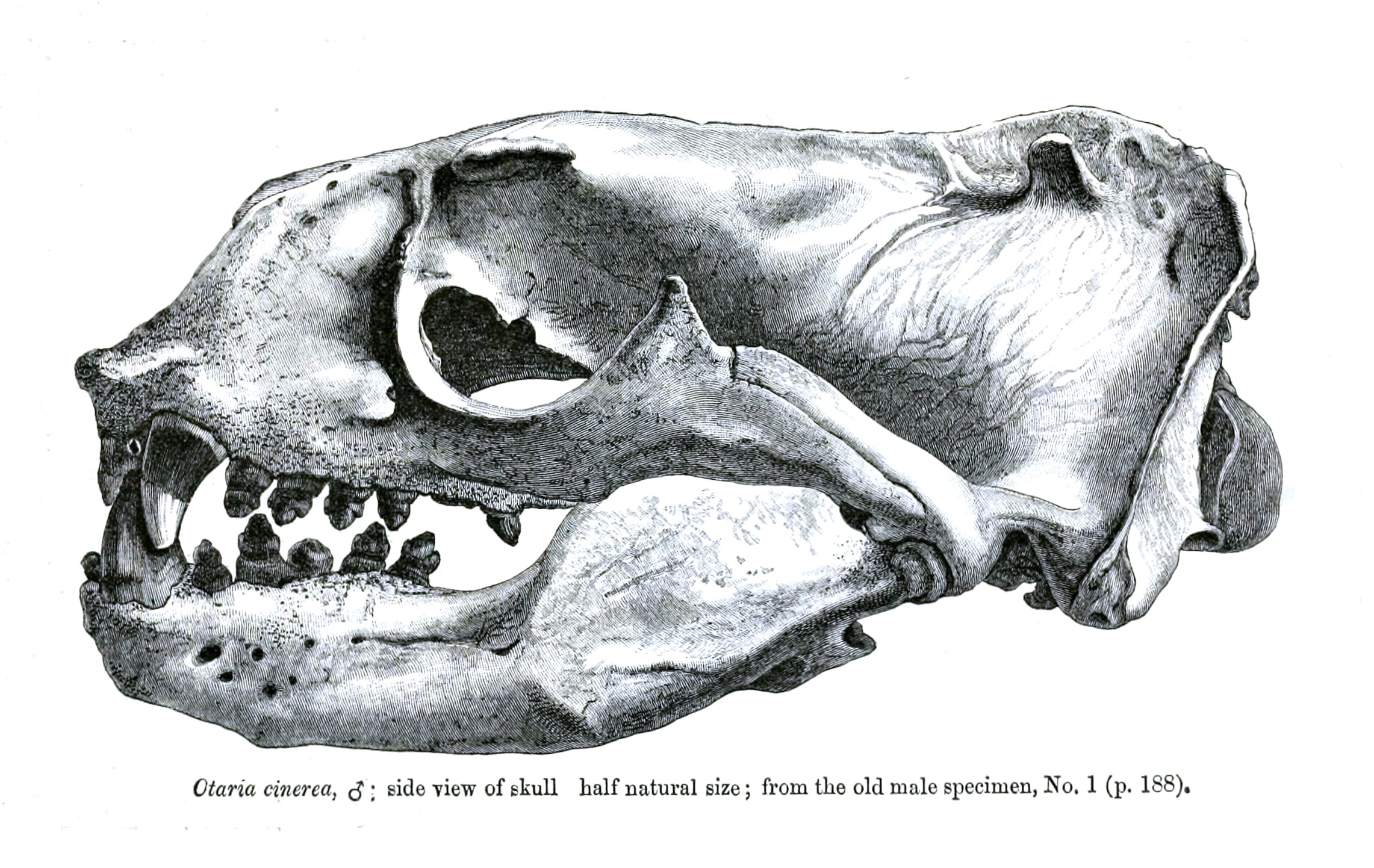
Skull, male

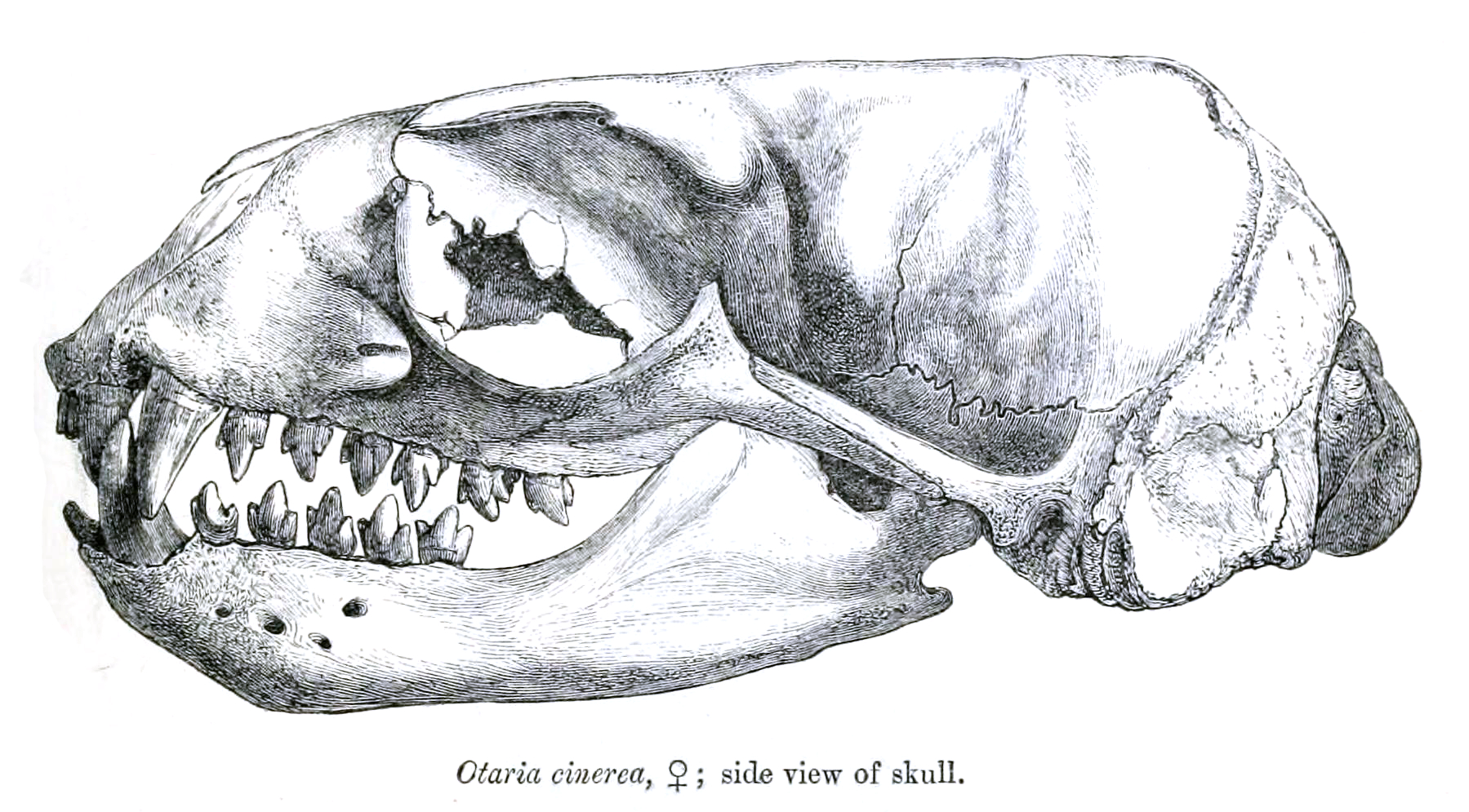
Skull, female

== Ecology ==
The South American sea lion is found along the coasts and offshore islands of South America, from Peru south to Cape Horn and then north to southern Brazil. Notable breeding colonies include Lobos Island, Uruguay; Peninsula Valdes, Argentina; Beagle Channel, and the Falkland Islands. Some individuals wander as far north as southern Ecuador, although apparently they never bred there. However, the movement ecology of South American sea lions remains poorly understood, although biologging studies in recent years have advanced our understanding of their at-sea movements at some breeding locations. There is no evidence of a winter migration of sea lions from the Falkland Islands.

South American sea lions breed on beaches made of sand, gravel, rocks, or pebbles. They can also be seen on flat, rocky cliffs with tidepools. Sea lion colonies tend to be small and scattered, especially on rocky beaches. The colonies make spaces between each individual when the weather is warm and sunny.

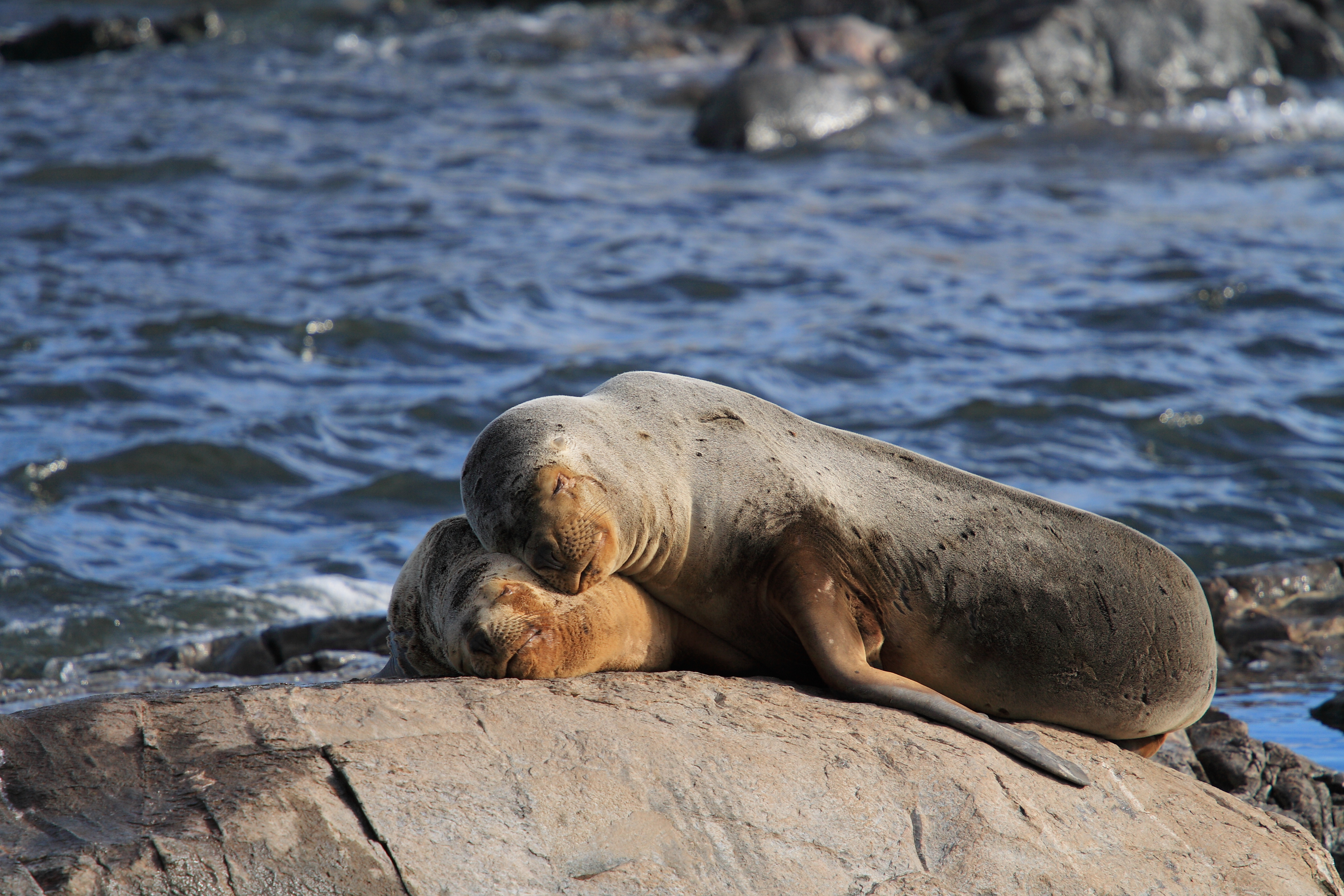
Beagle Channel, Tierra del Fuego

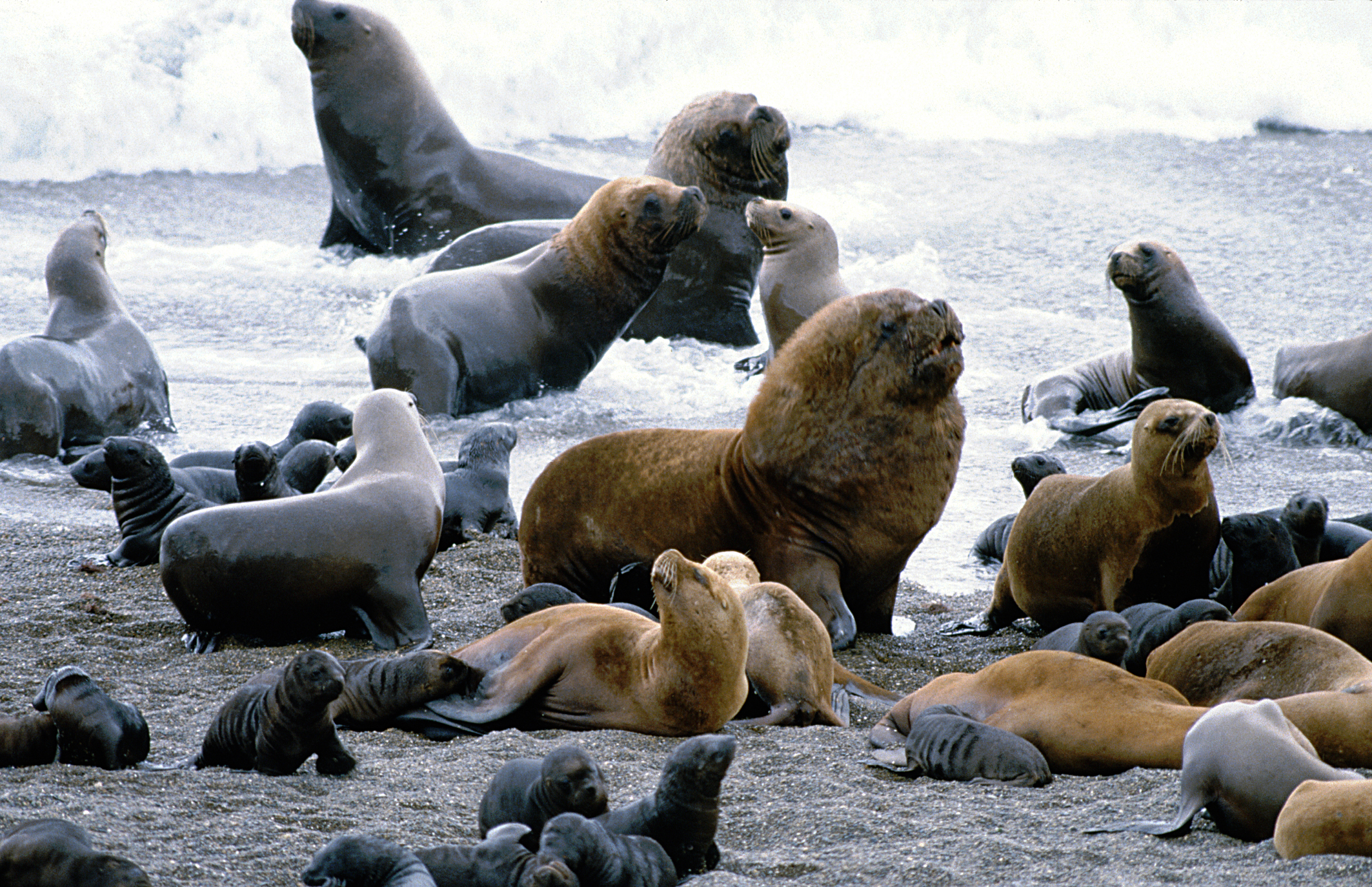
colony at Peninsula Valdes, Argentina

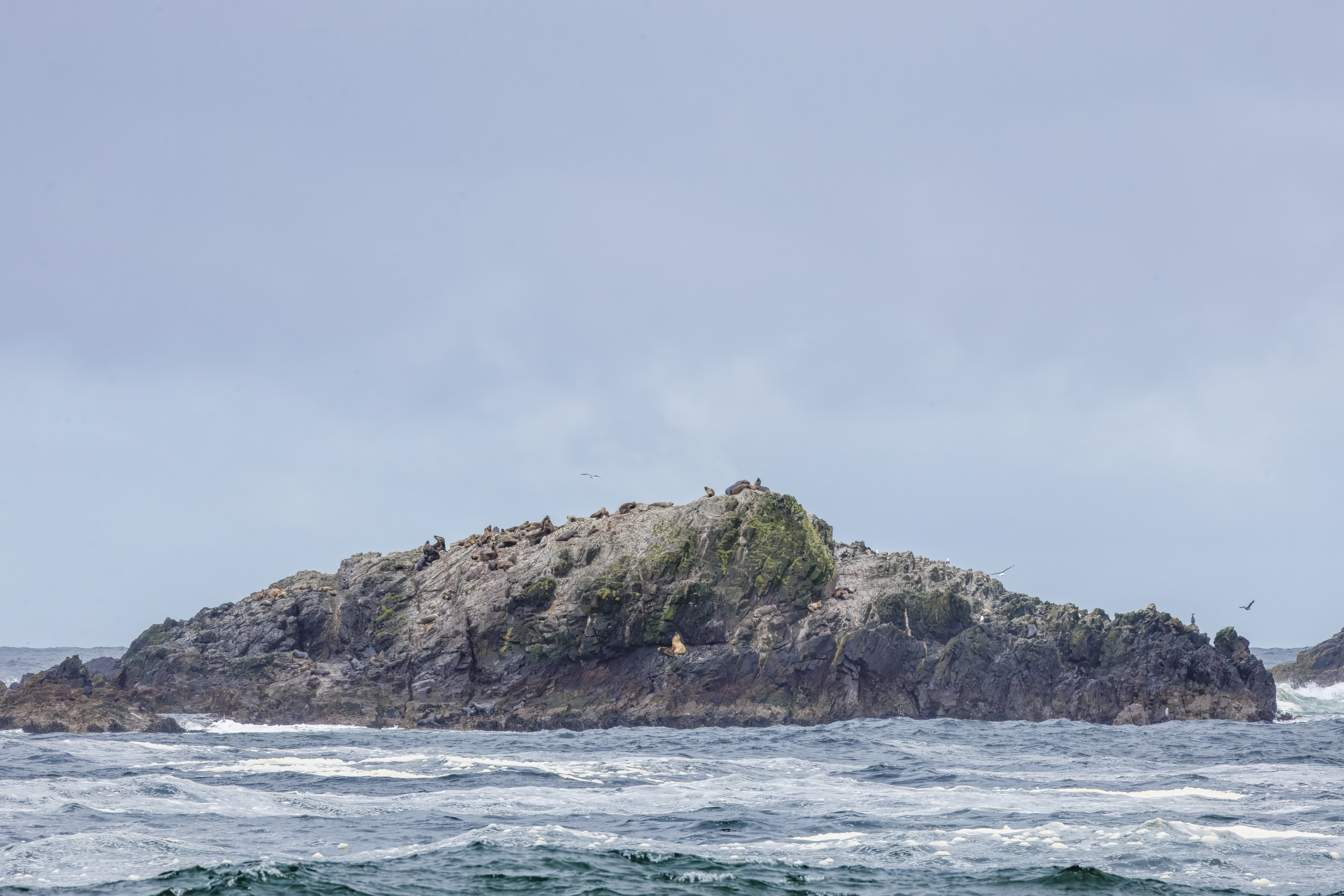
colony on Chiloe, Chile

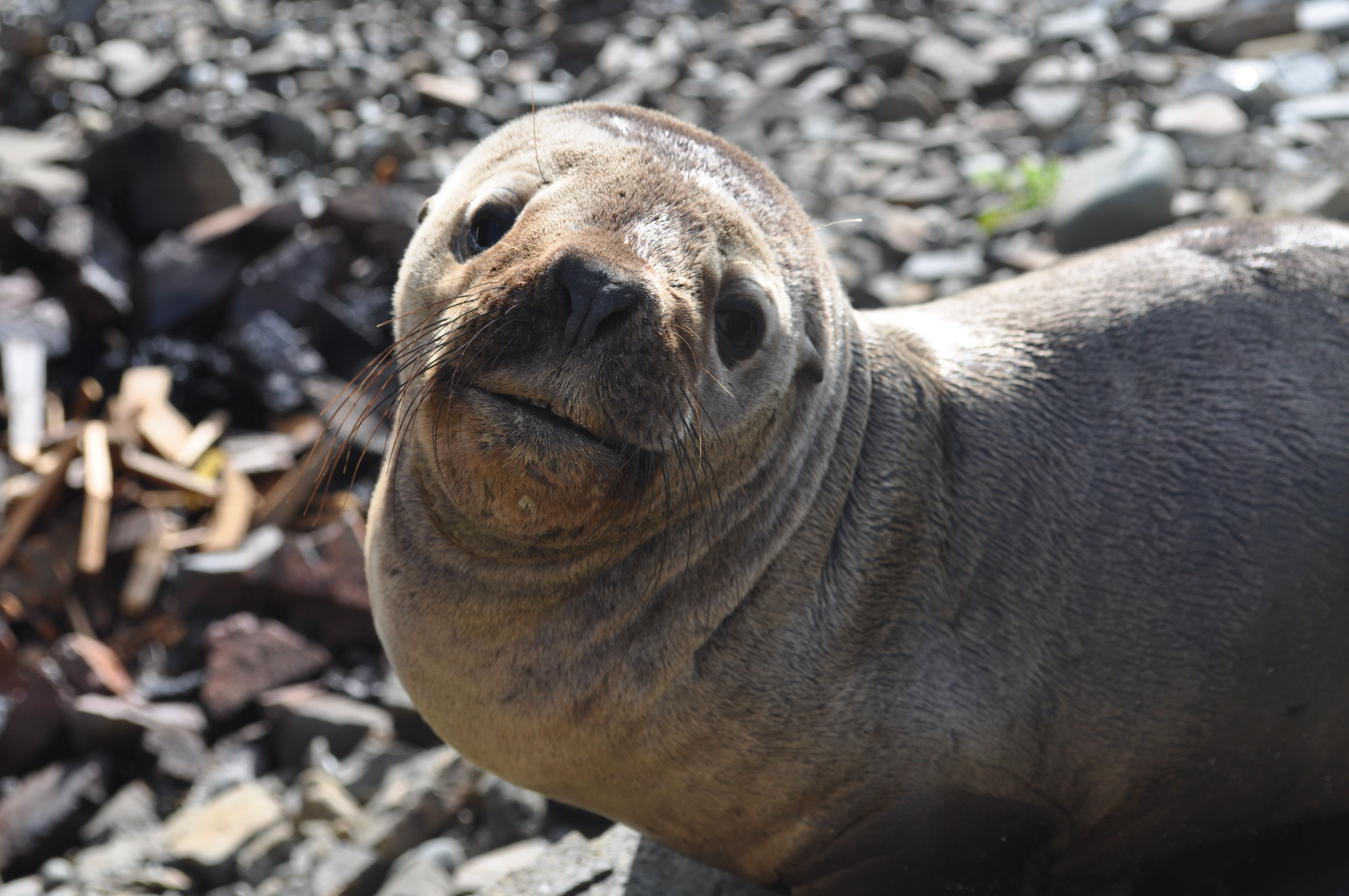
Female in Los Molles, Chile

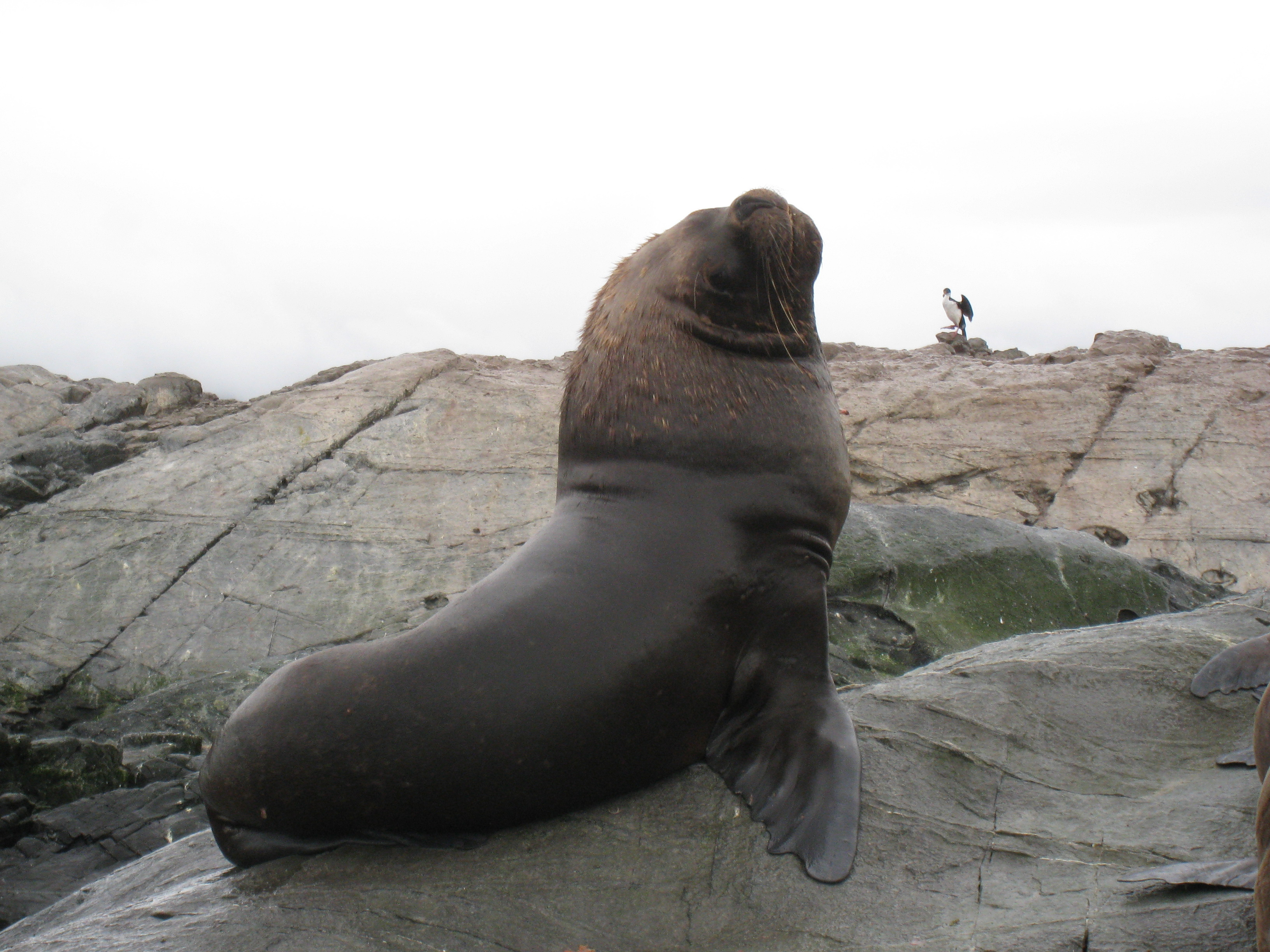
Seal Island, Beagle Channel

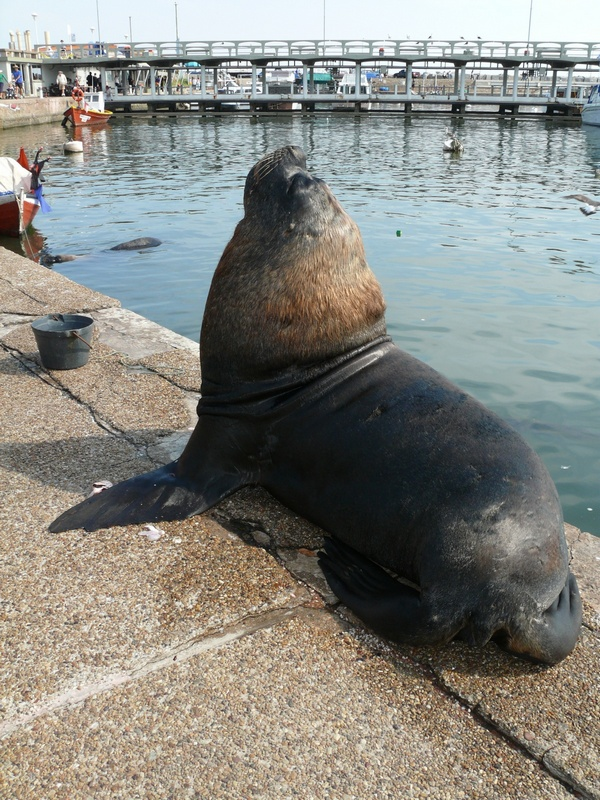
In The Punta Del Este Port

South American sea lions consume numerous species of fishes, including Argentine hake and anchovies. They also eat cephalopods, such as shortfin squid, Patagonian squid, and octopus, as well as crustaceans and other invertebrates depending on local abundance. They have even been observed preying on penguins, pelicans, and female and young South American fur seals. South American sea lions may forage at the ocean floor for slow-moving prey or hunt schooling prey in groups, depending on the area. They have been observed to chase penguins on land. When captured, the prey is shaken violently and torn apart. South American sea lions have been recorded to take advantage of the hunting efforts of dusky dolphins. The sea lions themselves are preyed on by orcas and sharks; at Peninsula Valdes, orcas will beach themselves and grab sea lions near shore.

== Life history ==
Mating occurs between December and February. Males arrive first to establish and defend territories. Estrus in females usually begins six days after the birth of a pup and soon after the copulations start with a peak in January. At Peninsula Valdes, males first defend territories, but then switch to defending females when they arrive. A male aggressively herds females in his territory—even chasing after those that escape—and defends them from both neighbors and intruders. At Isla de Lobos, males near the surf have a similar breeding system, defending females and "floating" territories, while those further inland strictly defend territories around tide pools which attract females. The number of actual fights between males depends on the number of females in heat. The earlier a male arrives at the site, the longer his tenure will be and the more copulations he will achieve. Males are usually able to keep around three females in their harems, but some have as many as 18.

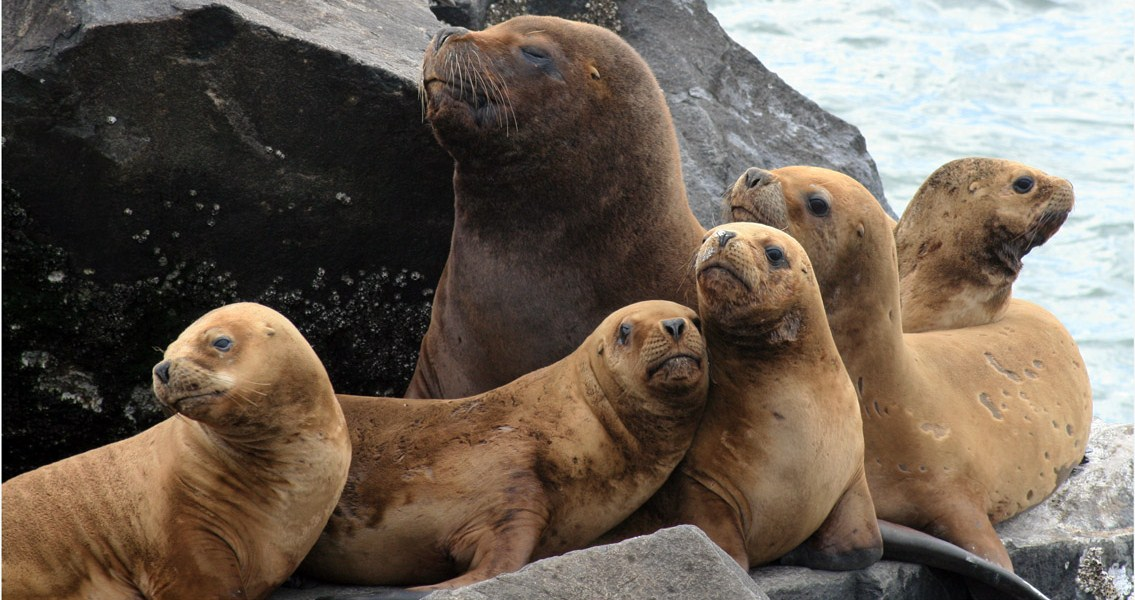
Male with harem

During the breeding season, males that fail to secure territories and harems, most often subadults, will cause group raids in an attempt to change the status quo and gain access to the females. Group raids are more common on sandy beaches than rocky ones. These raids cause chaos in the breeding harems, often splitting mothers from their young. The resident males try to fight off the raiders and keep all the females in their territorial boundaries. Raiders are often unsuccessful in securing a female, but some are able to capture some females or even stay in the breeding area with one or more females. Sometimes, an invading male abducts pups, possibly as an attempt to control the females. They also take pups as substitutes for mature females. Subadults herd their captured pups and prevent them from escaping, much like adult males do to females. A pup may be mounted by its abductor, but intromission does not occur. While abducting pups does not give males immediate reproductive benefits, these males may gain experience in controlling females. Pups are sometimes severely injured or killed during abductions.

Despite being mostly a harem-territorial species, one population in Peru has been recorded having a lek-like breeding system. Here, with its longer ratio of males in comparison to females, the males cluster together and display and try to attract females while allowing them to move freely. The warmer climate also makes the females move constantly to the water, further making the traditional mating system difficult to maintain. The group raids that exist in temperate populations are virtually non-existent here.

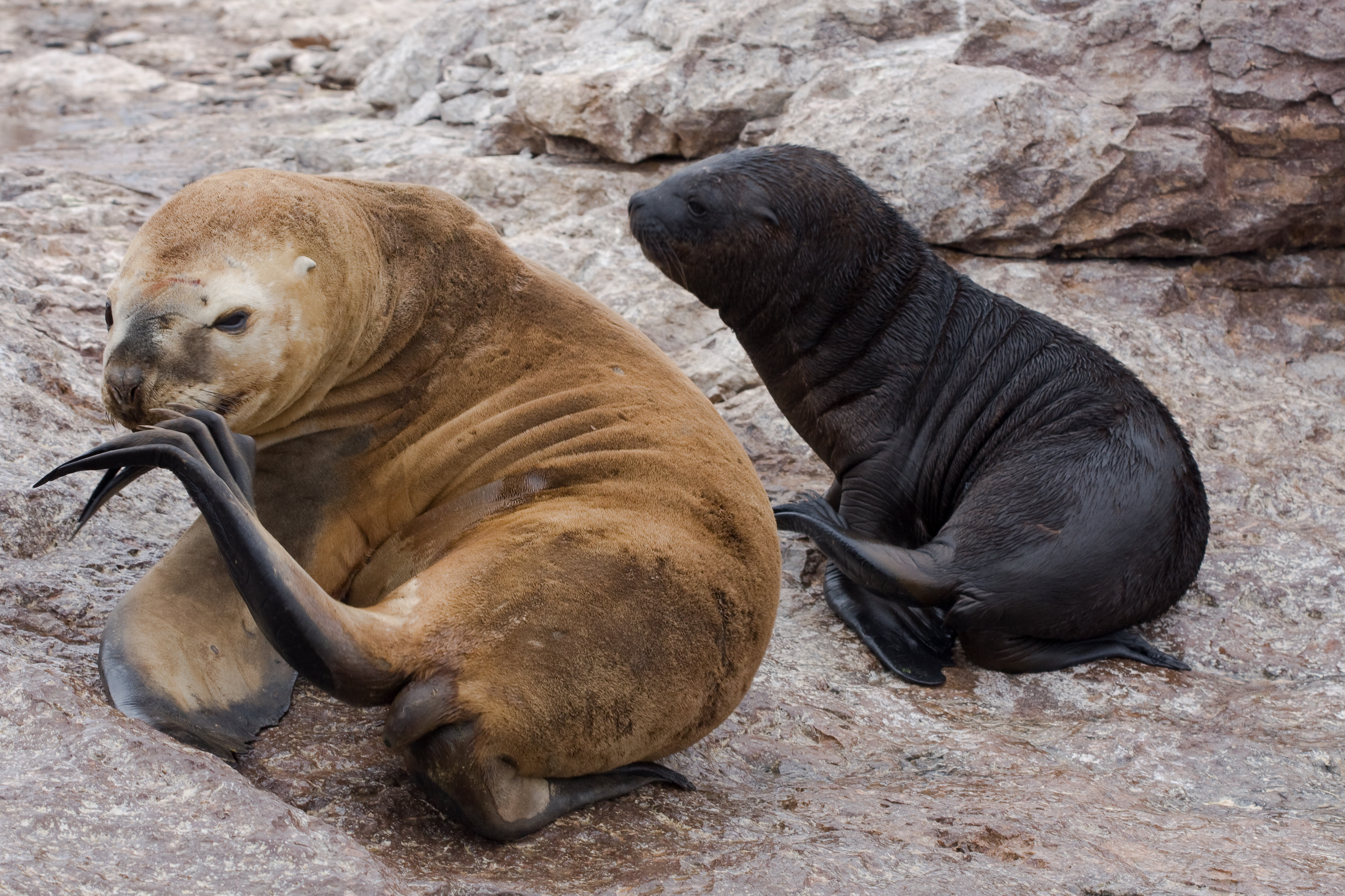
female and pup

Sea lion mothers remain with their newborn pups for nearly a week before making a routine of taking three-day foraging trips and coming back to nurse the pups. They act aggressively to other females that come close to their pups, as well as alien pups that try to get milk from them. Pups first enter the water at about four weeks and are weaned at about 12 months. This is normally when the mother gives birth to a new pup. Pups gradually spend more time in the nearshore surf and develop swimming skills.

South American sea lions are observed to make various vocalizations and calls which differ between sexes and ages. Adult males make high-pitched calls during aggressive interactions, barks and growls when establishing territories, growls when interacting with females, and exhalations after antagonistic encounters. Females with pups make a mother primary call when interacting with their pups, and grunts during aggressive encounters with other females. Pups make pup primary calls. Some of those vocalizations and acoustic features may support individuality.

== Human interactions ==
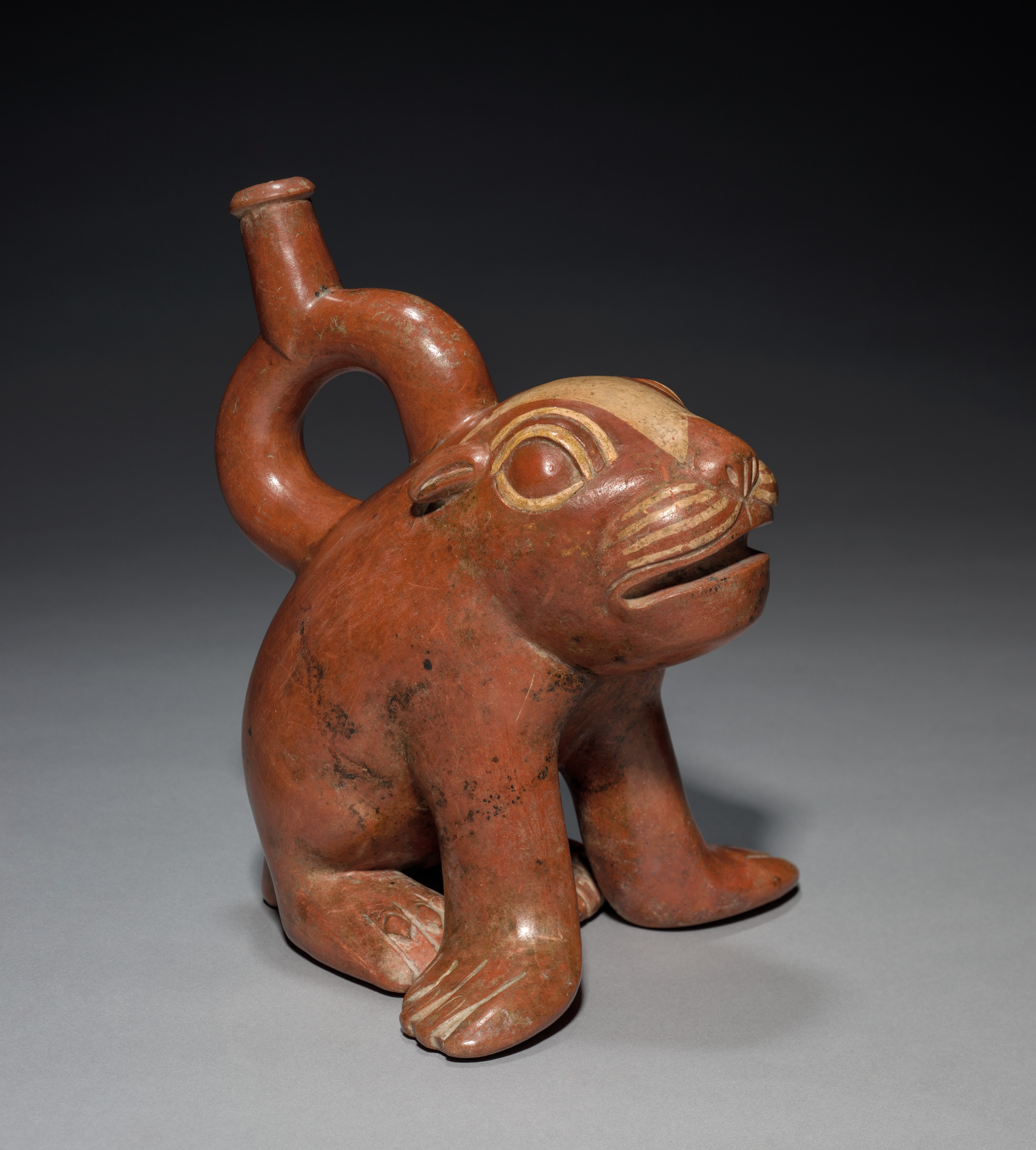
Sea lion pup depicted in Moche art

The Moche people of ancient Peru worshipped the sea and its animals. They often depicted South American sea lions in their art. Two statues of this species are the symbol of the city of Mar del Plata.

This species was exploited by Indigenous peoples of South America for millennia and by Europeans around the 16th century. The hunting has since gone down and the species is no longer threatened. The species is protected in most of its range. Numerous reserves and protected areas at rookeries and haul-out sites exist for the sea lions. Despite this, protection regulations are not effectively enforced in much of animals' range.

The overall population of sea lions is considered stable; the estimate is 265,000 animals. They are declining in the Falkland Islands, and in Argentina Patagonia, but are increasing in Chile and Uruguay. Many sea lions of the Peruvian population died in the 1997/1998 el Niño. They still are killed due to their habits of stealing fish and damaging fishing nets.

== See also ==
- Unihemispheric slow-wave sleep
- Pincoy – a sea-spirit in Chilote mythology that resembles a sea lion
