= Caleuche =

Mythical ghost ship in Chilean mythology

El Caleuche or The Caleuche (Spanish pronunciation: [kalˈeutʃe]), also known by other names such as Buque de Arte (the Magic Ship) or the Barcoiche, is a legendary ghost ship from Chilote mythology in southern Chile.

== Nomenclature ==
The Caleuche is also known as the Buque de Arte ("the Magic Ship"). Natives also refer to it as the Barcoiche, the Gauiteca, the Saiza, El Marino or Barco Marino ("Marine Ship") or Buque de Fuego ("Fire Ship").

While Buque Fantasma ("Ghost Ship") has been given as another alias proper name, earlier commentators use this term for ghost ship lore in general, including the legends from Europe from which the Chilean version may have derived certain base elements. (Note: "bajel fantasma" is also used as the generic term (for ghost ships of the Strait of Magellan and the seas of Europe) in the gloss for Caleuche by F. J. Cavada.)

=== Etymology ===
One theory derives "caleuche" from Mapuche/Mapudungun/Araucanian caleutun (var. kalewtun) "to transform, to change condition" and che "people". Alternately it may derive from calül "human body" and che "people".

There is also the hypothesis that the legend originates from an early 17th century Dutch ship Kalache or El Calanche, lost at sea (Cf. § Origin explanations).

== Legend ==
The legend of the Caleuche is related to many aspects of history and the beliefs of the Chiloé archipelago. It travels along Chiloé canals.

The Caleuche is a pirate ship crewed by witches and demons, only witnessed at night. It appears as a brightly illuminated ship, (Note: A barebone version is localized as lore of Castro.) (Note: Vicuña Cifuentes (1914), p. 425 citing Cavada, Darío (1896). Chiloé.) and blamed for the kidnappings of young women, night raids, and robberies. The ship captures sailors aboard other boats by attracting them with alluring orchestral music. Allegedly, ordinary people who board it fall into a kind of stupor, preventing them from divulging any secrets about the ship later (lore of Puerto Varas). Anyone who falls victim turns mad, with his face always turning backwards.

The Caleuche can disappear instantly; it can also take on the appearance of other things to escape notice, e.g., turn into a tree trunk (especially cypress) and even come ashore that way, or remain afloat, or the ship may turn into a rock as well. (Note: Cavada (1914), repeated by Plath.) Its sailors can transform into seals, sea lions, (Note: Spanish: lobos [marinos].) dolphins, or sea birds. The ship sails at extraordinary speed. In order to observe the ship without being noticed, one must cover one's mouth, because they can smell one's breath. There are also varieties of trees behind which one can hide so as to not be captured by the Caleuche, some being the maqui berry tree (Chilean wineberry) and the tique tree (olivillo).

It is said that when certain conditions are met, such as it being a foggy day, the ship becomes discernable to other seafarers (or the luminous ship seems to appear and disappear surrounded by fog): the sounds of chains, parties, music ("flutes, horns, pipes, and drums" (Note: Spanish: "flautas, cuernos, pitos y tambores")), and the dominating outline of the ship makes it unmistakable. According to some, it is an incorporeal ship, and will pass right through other vessels, but some insist it is real enough.

Many believe that the sailors of this ship have a leg attached to their spine, similar to the invunche (imbunche, a deformed humanoid monster). Other informants add that the crew's deformity of one leg bent backward forces them to hop around to maneuver, and, as aforementioned, are purposely kept as forgetful idiots in order to protect the ship's secrets. In contrast, others describe the crew as specially dressed and well-presented ("walking elegantly in long leather boots" (Note: "Todos andan muy elegantes, calzando largas botas de charol")), except when one greets them with a handshake, their hands will feel very cold.

The Buque de Arte is furthermore a submarine ship, and also navigates up rivers or canals. In one version (lore of Valdivia), it is more particularly a submarine steamship, and the potential recruits are taken to a treasured city at the bottom of the sea, but sworn to secrecy on pain of death.

When the ship is in need of repair, it prefers to go to a ravine or cliff to work on the damaged hull or machinery during the night.

=== Merry merchant ship ===
As common as the tale of a haunted ship of dead and enslaved sailors, there also exists a version of this tale where the Magical Ship houses sorcerers of Chiloé, and they party and transport merchandise. It is also stated that the sorcerers return from a voyage that they make every 3 months in order to strengthen their powers. It is said that only crewmembers can board the ship and use the caballo marino ("sea-horse", mythological creature that can carry 13 warlocks on its back) as a form of transportation, but the rules of the witches forbid the men from entering the ship by any other means than riding the caballo marino.

Some have even claimed to have attended parties held aboard the ship. But the crew of the Caleuche would rather cavort with women on land when holding their carousals, so they bargain with merchants to rent out their daughters in exchange for merchandise. (Note: Or they like to dance with the daughters of port captains (los capitanes del puerto) who would be handsomely compensated with money.) Sometimes if a merchant is suspiciously prospering without showing efforts of transacting business, this will invite rumors from the local Chiloense that they are "protegés of El Marino". According to legend, merchants who made a pact with the ship have black hens and tarred boats with ropes of quilineja.

In a different telling, when the crew of the ghost ship are on their shore leave, they impose themselves on friends or on someone who has committed some petty crime and force them to entertain the sailors at the host's expense. (Note: Specifically José Huala who used explosives to catch fish was forced to entertain, and the cost ruined his fortune.)

One collected tale claims a slender chalupa type boat commanded by a certain young man from Chonchi never returned, but the father rather than to mourn only smiled knowingly, indicating he was sure the son was safely aboard the Caleuche. The man thereafter grew increasingly rich, and people heard the sound of chains being lowered at the house over several nights; it was the Caleuche furtively unloading its cargo of merchandise to benefit this merchant. The commentary makes connection to the aforementioned popular belief that a man suddenly getting rich will be suspected of carrying on secret commerce with the ghost ship. (Note: The tale is paraphrased or repeated by Vicuña Cifuentes (1914), p. 426 and Plath (2022) in Spanish, and by the Insight guide in English, which cites Plath)

Rumors like these were rampant following the 1960 Valdivia earthquake because some houses were untouched by the fires that swept through Chiloé afterwards. In that same decade there were stories that the sounds of a ship dropping anchor could be heard around the houses of many prosperous merchants in the Chiloé archipelago. These were supposedly the sounds of the Caleuche stealthily delivering goods and treasures to those with whom it had a pact. However, most people rejected this supernatural explanation and instead blamed the merchant's prosperity on mortal, rather than supernatural, smugglers.

This ship has three favorite ports of call: Llicaldac and Tren-Tren on the coast of the former Department of Castro, and Quicaví where the major cave of the Warlock king of Chiloé (rey de brujos de Chiloé) is located. The warlock king mounts a caballo marino (sea-horse) which is swifter than the ship. (Note: Cañas Pinochet (1911) later redacted by Vicuña Cifuentes (1914), p. 427)

=== Reckoning for sea creatures ===
The Magical Ship is commanded by the sea deity Millalobo to sail all over the seas to keep track of all marine creatures living and newly born. A legend tells that a man named Pancho Calhuante in the village of Matao took a sea lion (lobo) cub from its mother and slaughtered it to extract oil. The crew of the Caleuche arrived and exacted penalty by killing the man's eldest son.

In a different account El Caleuche itself had taken a sea lioness for a wife, which was killed by fishermen of Tenglo, opposite Puerto Montt. The enraged El Caleuche sent evils (eruptions of the Calbuco volcano) there, and also abducted the prettiest girls from the port.

=== Elysium of the drowned ===
Also, Millalobo's daughter Pincoya goes around collecting drowned sailors, bringing him ashore if still alive, or else brings the dead to the ghost ship for them to live a new life as crewmembers who will pass eternity in happiness. In another telling, the ship itself simply collects the drowned and recruit them as crew.

Some believe that their final destination is the port named City of the Caesars, a marvelous place hidden away somewhere along the Andes where its residents eternally reside.

== Eyewitness accounts ==
An incident being ascribed as an alleged sighting of this ghost ship occurred some time in 1909 or earlier (though the account says there was no vessel). It was witnessed by the various crew members on a Chilean navy boat, as attested by Agustín Prat, 2nd in command of the naval escampavía Huemul who wrote an account of it in a letter that he saw "two large, white lights (each about the size of a lantern).. hovering no more than one metre above surface, with no vessel in sight". The two light or flame bars joined together to form one large flame pillar, and travelled at a speed between 7 and 15 miles per hour.

A 1911 testimony of a luminous ship passing by was given by the guard officer and lantern-lighter aboard the ship Copiapó, documented in the port authority archives of Valparaíso. The ship "passed near them without stopping, without making noise, without stopping or responding to their signals".

== Origin explanations ==
Several hypotheses have been proposed to scientifically explain a luminous ship. The light may be some sort of phosphorescence out at sea; it could be bioluminescence from the glowworm (gusano de luz) or a large colony of Noctiluca scintillans. (Note: Alias N. milijaris given by source.) Or it could be some electrical phenomenon.

There are some who classify it as a phenomenon of OSNI (abbreviation of Spanish: objeto sumergible no identificado, i.e., unidentified submerged object) or OFNI (abbreviation of Spanish: objeto flotante no identificado, i.e., "unidentified floating object").

Between the various hypotheses that have been proposed on the origin of the legend, it is suggested that it could be a readaptation of the European legend of the ghost ship known as The Flying Dutchman. It has also been argued that it was based on real events, such as the Dutch ship Kalache (also given as El Calanche), led by Vincent van Eucht, which disappeared in the southern seas in the early 1600s. (Note: Offered as another possibility is that the legend has origins based on the arrival of Dutch privateer ships led by Baltazar de Cordes, arriving in the archipelago and capturing the island for brief period in the year 1600.) Another interpretation is that it was originally only an invention to hide contraband operations in the Chiloé Archipelago.

== In media ==
The legend of the Caleuche is referred to in Alastair Reynolds' 2001 novel Chasm City, when the Chilean crewmembers of a generation ship discover a "ghost ship" trailing the flotilla of colony vessels and dub the ship Caleuche.

The Caleuche is a ghost pirate ship that sails around the globe, captained by the Sirena Chilota mermaid from the original legends in The Vampire Blade Book Series by M.C. Waring.

In film and television, Raúl Ruiz's Three Crowns of the Sailor (1983) and Litoral (2008) and Jorge Olguín's Caleuche: The Call of the Sea (2012) are all loosely inspired by the legend.

== Scientific namesakes ==
Caleuche Chasma, the deepest canyon on the moon Charon, is named after the Caleuche. The exoplanet HD 164604 b is also formally named Caleuche.

== See also ==
- Mapuche mythology
- Chilean mythology
- Chiloé
- Magellan
- Marlborough (1876 ship)#Ghost ship - allegedly spotted in the Strait of Magellan
