= Imbunche =

Mythical monster in Chilean mythology

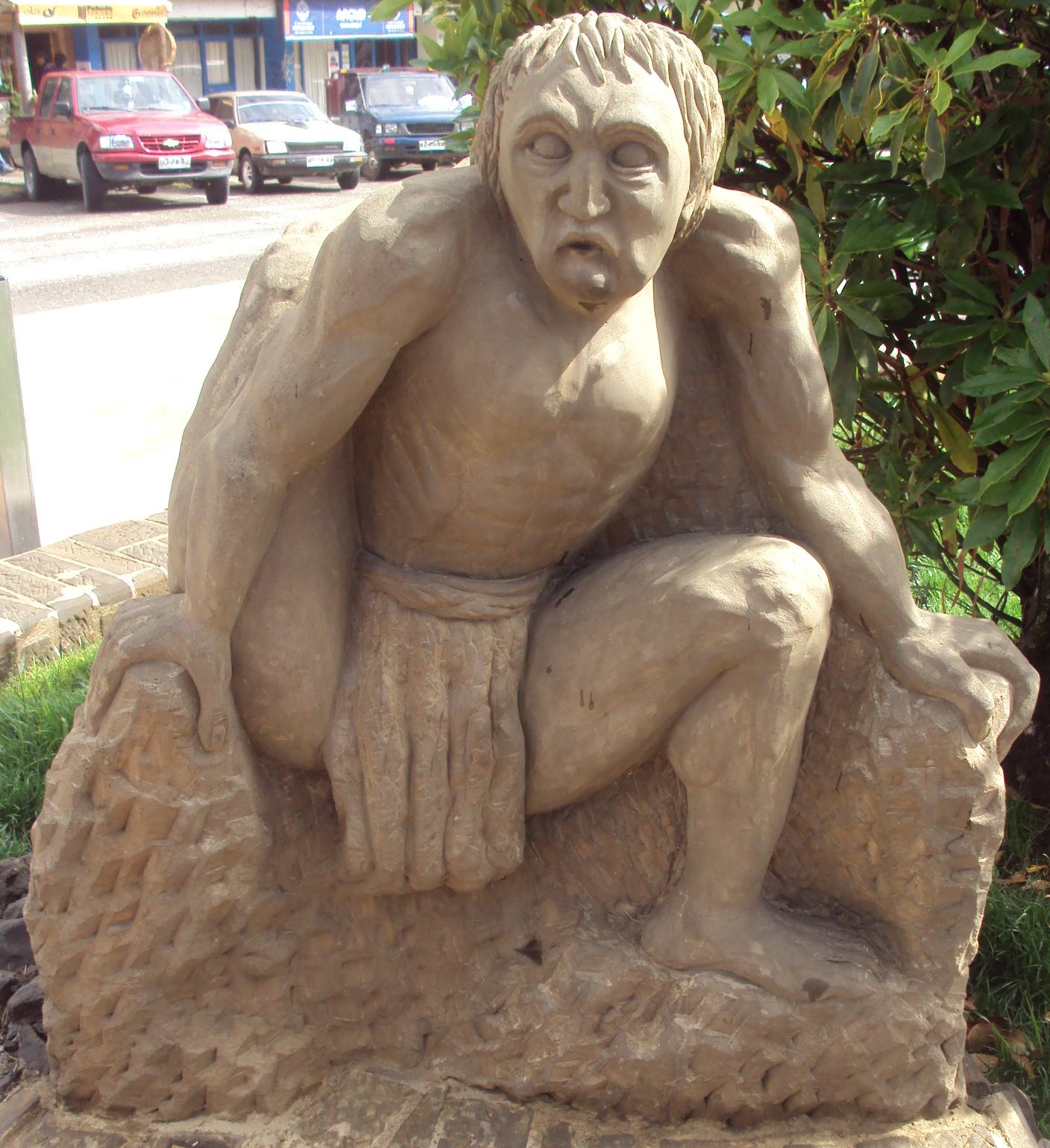
Imbunche statue in Plaza de Ancud, Chile.

In the Chilote folklore and Chilote mythology of Chiloé Island in southern Chile, the imbunche (Mapudungun: ifünche, lit. "short person") is a legendary monster that protects the entrance to a warlock's cave.

== Description ==
The imbunche is a deformed human with its head twisted backwards, along with having twisted arms, fingers, nose, mouth and ears. The creature walks on one foot or on three feet (actually one leg and two hands) because one of its legs is attached to the back of its neck. It has blue skin and sharp teeth. The imbunche cannot talk, and communicates only by guttural, rough and unpleasant sounds.

== Legend ==
According to legend, the imbunche is a first-born child less than nine days old that was kidnapped by, or sold by their parents to, a Brujo Chilote (a type of warlock of Chiloé). If the baby had been christened, the warlock debaptizes them through unknown means of black magic.

The Brujo chilote transforms the child into a deformed hairy monster by breaking their right leg and twisting it over their back. When the child is three months old their tongue is forked, their teeth turn sharp, their skin turns blue, and the warlock applies a magic cream over the child's back to cause thick hairs. During its first months the imbunche is fed on black cat's milk and goat flesh, and when old enough, with human corpses from cemeteries.

Besides guarding the entrance to the warlock's cave, the imbunche is used by warlocks as an instrument for revenge or curses. And, because it has acquired magical knowledge over its lifetime spent guarding the cave, even if the imbunche is not initiated into wizardry, it sometimes acts as the warlock's advisor.

The imbunche leaves the cave only in certain circumstances, such as when the cave is destroyed or discovered and the warlock moves to another cave, or when the warlocks have need of it and carry it thrashing and yelling, scaring the townspeople and announcing misfortune to come. The imbunche also comes out when the warlocks take it to the Warlock's Council.

The imbunche is fed solely by warlocks and is only allowed to search for its own edibles if food is lacking inside the cave.

== In popular culture ==
José Donoso's magical realist novel The Obscene Bird of Night reinterprets imbunche folklore as a way to bind a male child in a sack to prevent escape and bodily growth.

Travel writer Bruce Chatwin gives an account of Chilote witchcraft and the imbunche in his book In Patagonia.

British comic book writer Alan Moore wrote a version of the imbunche (here spelled invunche) very similar to Chatwin's description during his run on Swamp Thing, as an antagonist to John Constantine in the first story he appeared in. This imbunche has both legs turned backwards and the tongue is not forked. In addition, the left hand has been sewn under the skin of the right abdominal area making it appear as if the hand is tucked away.

An Imbunche appears in the Secret Saturdays animated series.

In the 2000 novel Portrait in Sepia (Retrato en Sepia) by Isabel Allende, the character Aurora del Valle recalls being told about the Imbunche in her childhood.

In the 2014 urban fantasy television series Constantine (based on the comics Swamp Thing and Hellblazer), the title character says that imbunche are nasty creatures that tore out throats during the time of Noah, but were presumed destroyed in the Great Flood. A living imbunche appears in "The Saint of Last Resorts". Constantine's friend, Ben, died because of an imbunche.

In the 2019 novel Nuestra parte de noche (translated to English in 2022 by Megan McDowell) by Mariana Enriquez who is based on Buenos Aires imbunche are mentioned. The main character, Juan, describes children who look like imbunche that are kept in a cave then saying “He turned back, ready to confront Mercedes, who was waiting for him at the door beside her imbunche child.” (Page 132).

In the 2020 Chilean-Brazilian Annecy-nominated animated film Nahuel and the Magic Book, Nahuel answered the riddle about the Imbunche when he made a deal with a goblin at the tavern.
