= Mythical Museum Ramón Elías =

Mythology museum in Paragaury

The Mythical Museum Ramón Elías
- (Spanish: Museo Mitológico Ramón Elías),
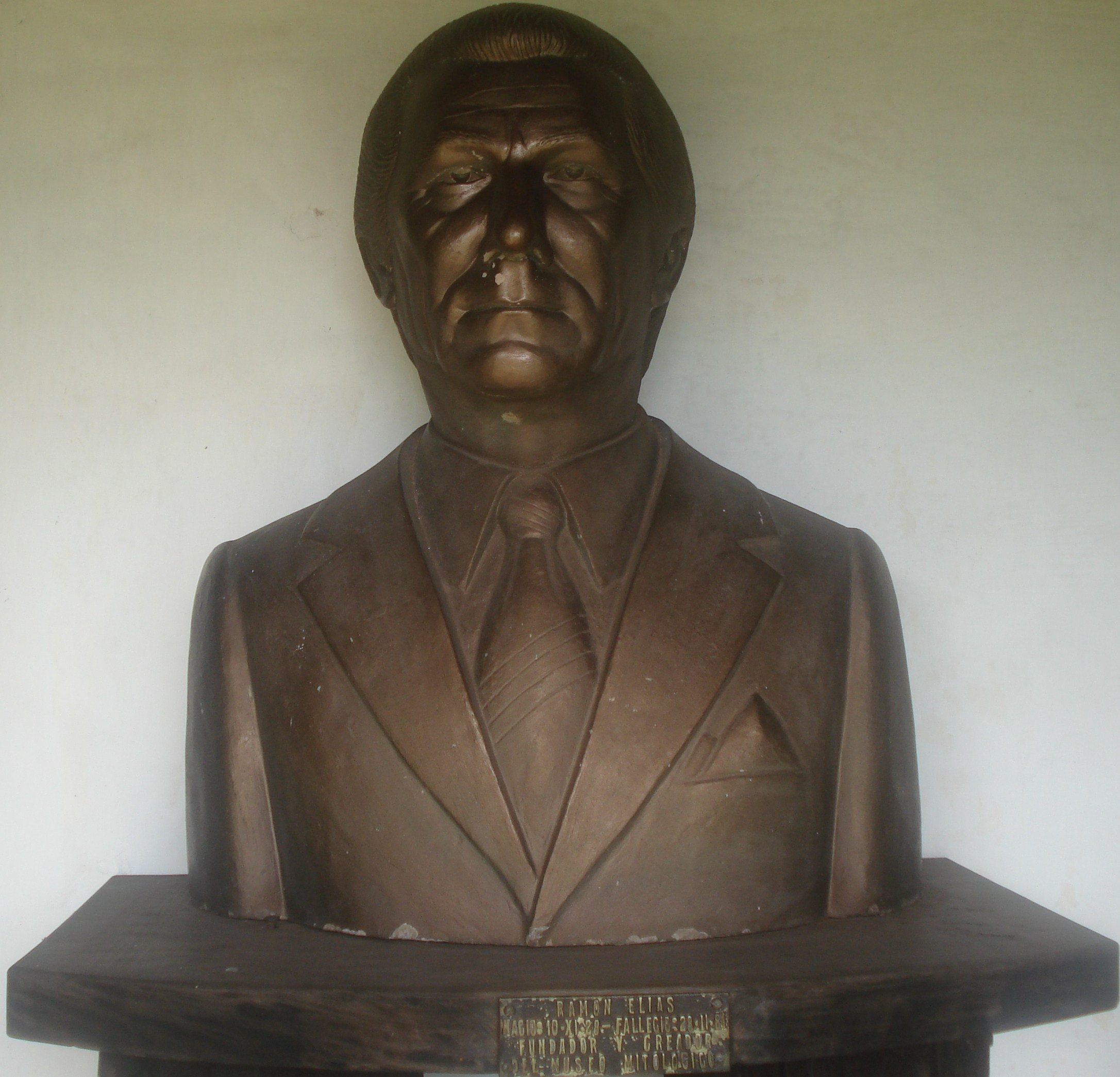
- Ramón Elías.
- Established: 1979
- Location: Capiatá, Paraguay
- Founder: Ramón Elías

The Mythical Museum Ramón Elías (Spanish: Museo Mitológico Ramón Elías), called honoring its founder, is a mythology museum in Capiatá, Paraguay.

This museum evokes memories from Paraguay's ancestors and at the same time is a calling out to maintain in the Paraguayan culture the presence of myths.

== The founder ==
Ramón Elías was born November 10, 1929. His father was Don José Elías (Arab) and his mother was Doña Francisca Fernández (Paraguayan).

His Elementary School was in Concepción, and his Secondary School in the capital city Asunción.

During his childhood, he was interested in sports, especially basketball, he promoted basket in Capiatá and was also one of the most popular players in Capiatà League.

On September 25, 1954, he married Elsa Agueda, Salvador Céspedes Valdez and Petrona Gamarra Gaona's daughter. They had six children.

He was very good at painting so was given a scholarship at Escuela de Bellas Artes from Asunción. He also restored antiquities, through researches and recompilations, one of his favorite activities. From 1967 to 1972 he was a teacher (drawing and geometry) at Colegio Nacional de Capiatá, he also made the seal office of the Municipalidad.

Ramón Elías made native masks combining different kinds of ingredients. His masks were put on view at the Dirección de Turismo in Paraguay in May 1966 and La Casa Paraguaya in Buenos Aires, Argentina.

Since he was a very curious person and had a researcher spirit, he travelled all the small towns in the interior of the country looking for antiquities which were bought and restored to be sold. During that time he met many elderly people, who knew a lot of historic memories about tales of magic characters. That was the time when he got into the world of mystery about myths and dedicated himself to interpret and make people know through fantastic sculptures. Don Ramón Elías is considered the father of the images of Paraguayan myths the same that long ago were found only in Paraguayan literature.

== The Beginning of the museum ==
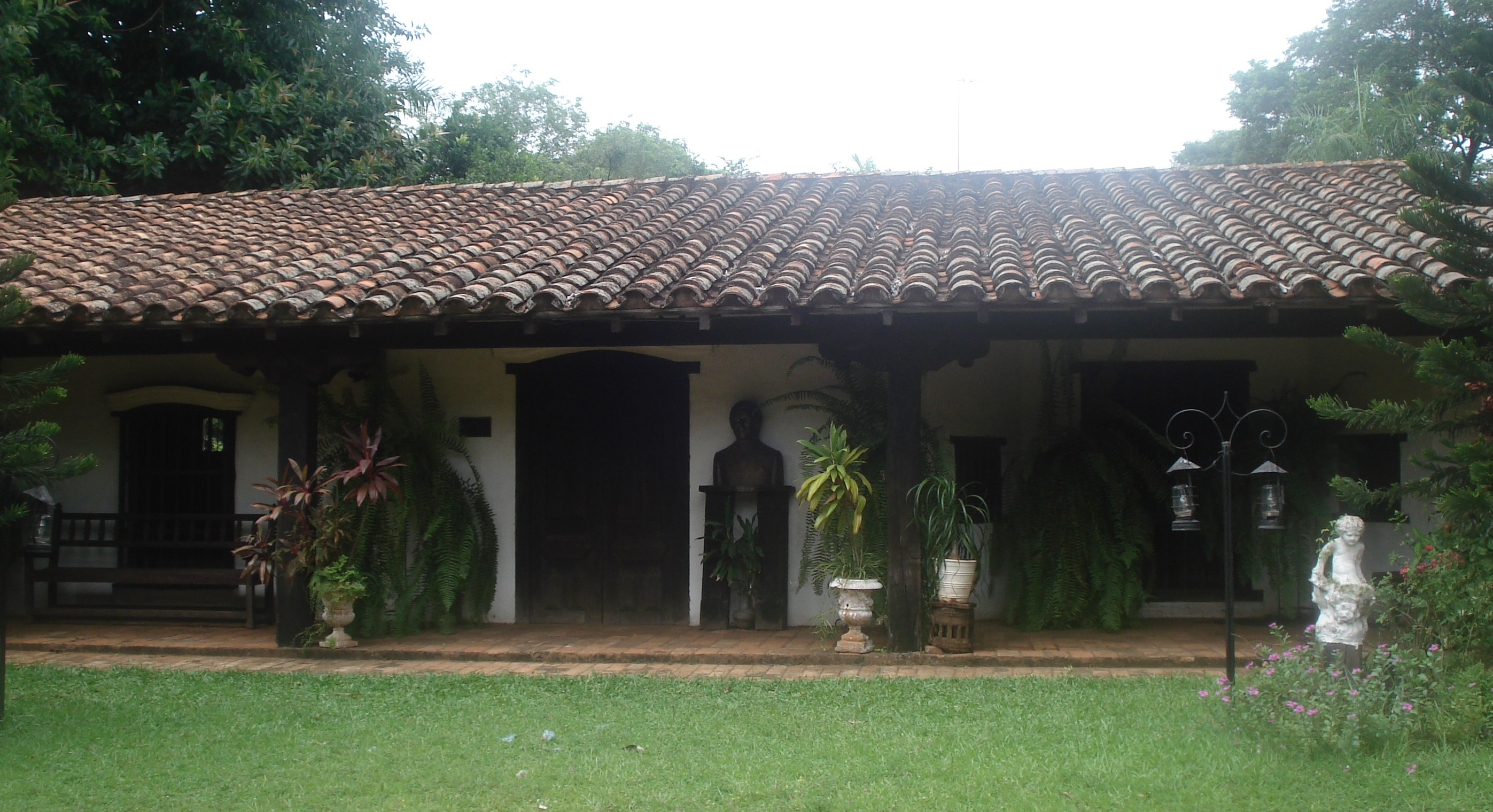
Front view.

Elías' had a great interest and passion for the characters of the Paraguayan mythology. He put a lot of effort in his research, data collection and visits to different places to gather information and small pieces of the Paraguayan history.

Ramón Elías had the idea of a place to put together all the objects he found from long ago, objects from the Guaraníes, Franciscanos, Jesuítas and from the Colonial period.

The “Mythical Museum Ramón Elías” opened in 1979.

== Characteristics of the museum ==
The lighting of this place, the walls, and the floor everything is the framework to be part of the magic monsters represented.

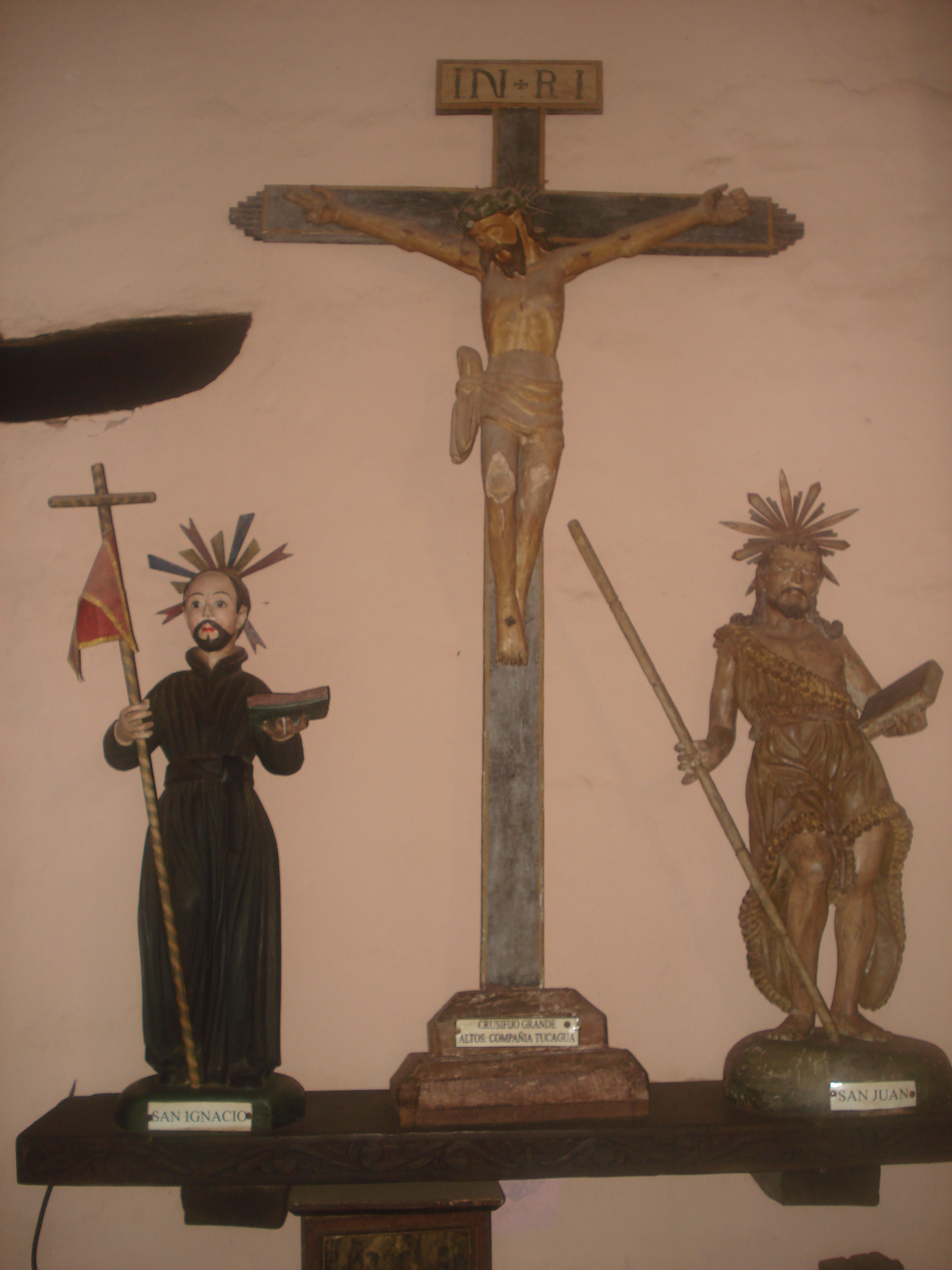
Crucifix, Colonial Period. Altos Compañía Tucaguá.

The museum has three big rooms: in the first room one can find all the creatures of the Paraguayan mythology; in the second one, all the objects and altarpieces from the first Franciscanos and Jesuitas who came to Paraguay to share their religion and believes. In the third room, photographs and elements used during the Paraguayan War and the Chaco war.

== Guaraní mythology ==
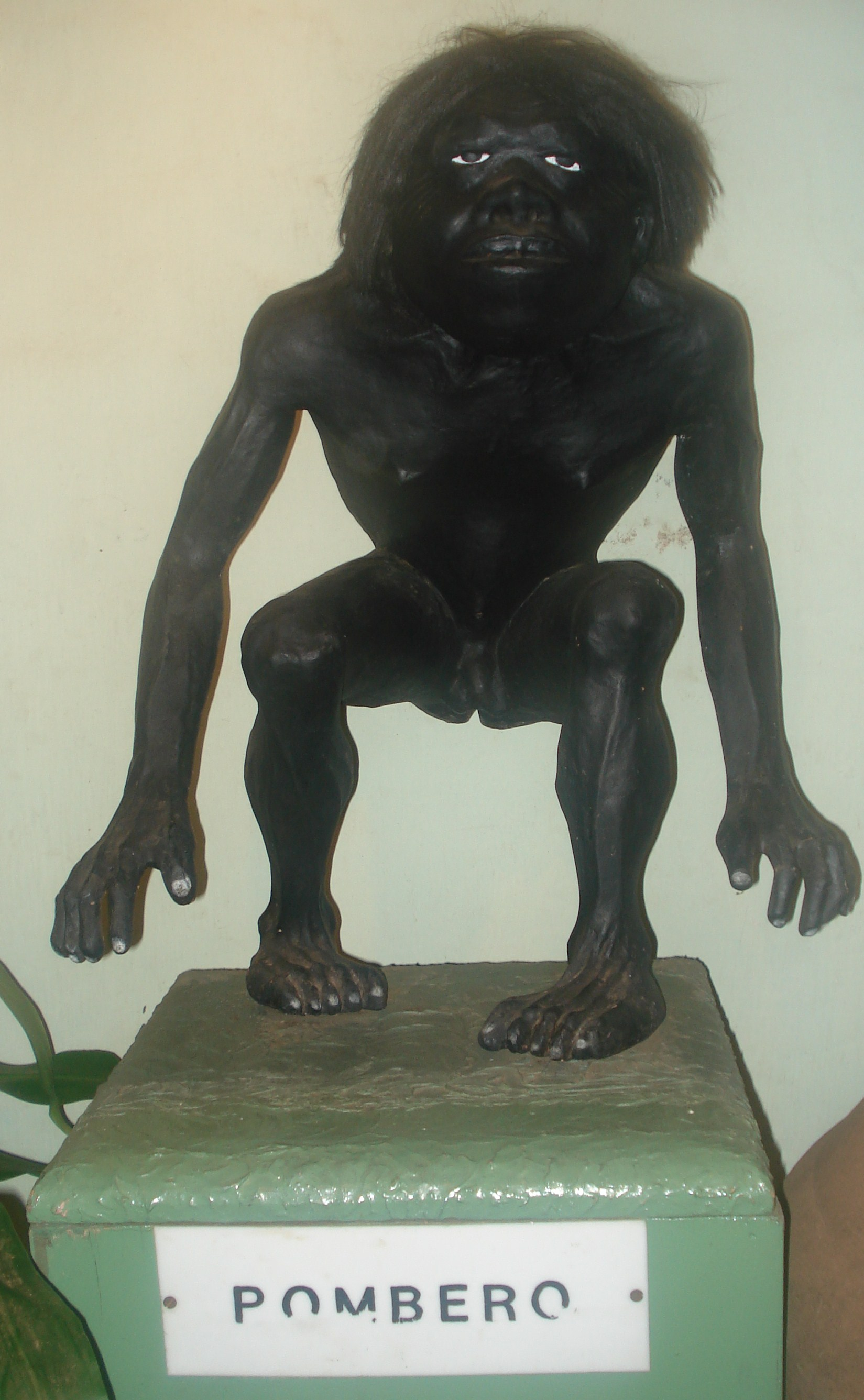
Pombero. Paraguayan Myth.

All the mythological creatures of the Paraguayan Culture are represented in the museum. Each one has its own story mixed up with what people believe it happened, a bit of real and fantasy. Explanations of those mysteries mind can not solve but the ancestors made them part of Paraguayan literature.

Inside glass boxes, human size the most popular characters of the Guaraní Mythology. They are Tau and Keraná, Ao Ao, Jasy Jateré, Pombero, Kuarahy Ra’y, Paje, Mala Visión, Luison, Mboi Jagua, Jagua Ru, Kurupi, Moñái, Mbói Tu'ĩ, Teju Jagua and Plata Yvyguy.

== Benefits for the culture ==
The “Mythical Museum Ramón Elías” is important because it is a place where Paraguayan people find and transmit their culture and identity. Elías has worked a lot to give the portrait of time and characters that are part of the Paraguayan History. He worked with native people learning about facts from long ago and explaining the way Paraguayan people are, think and live.

== Ramón Elías and his death ==
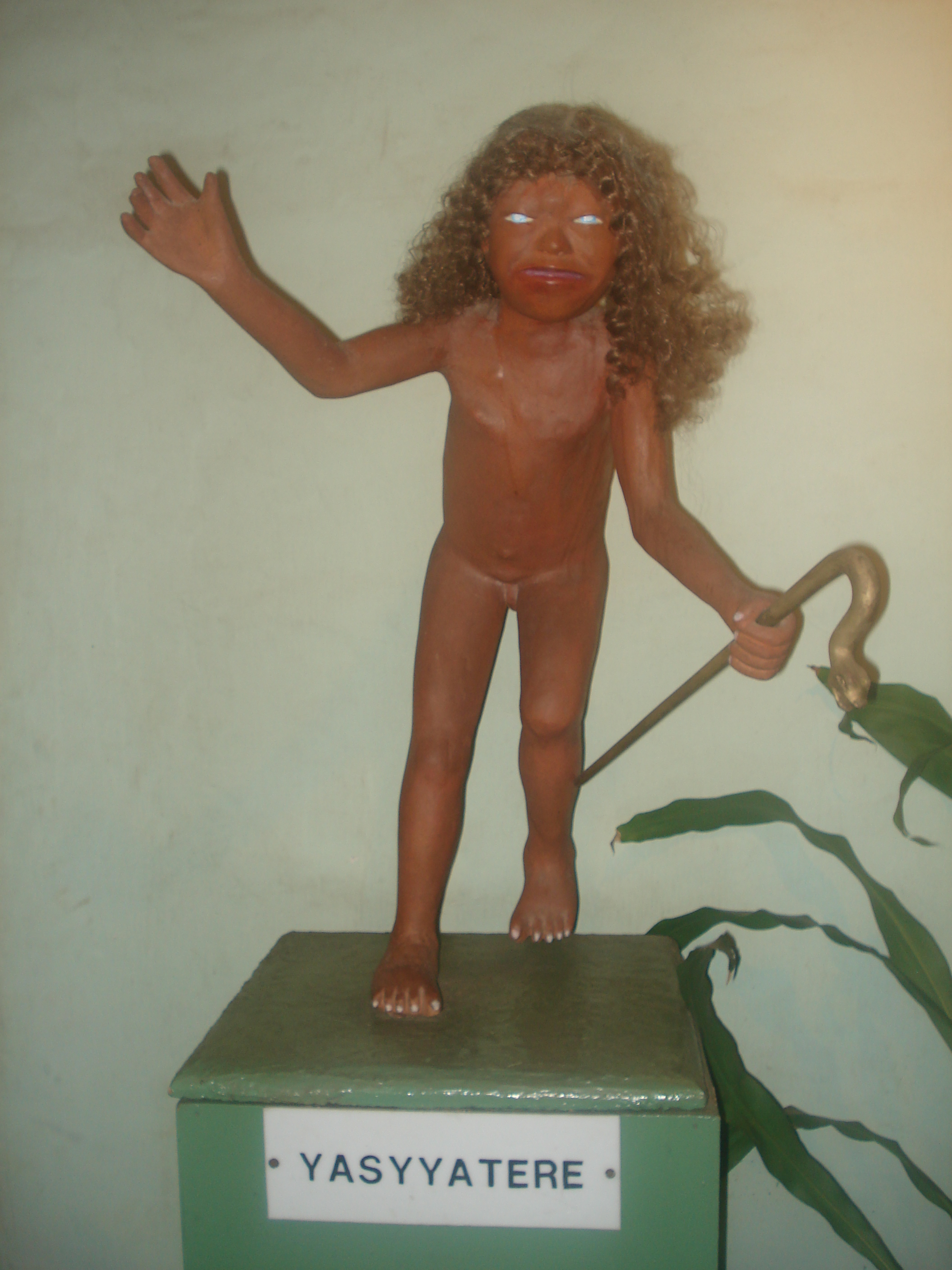
Yasy Yatere.

Elías worked during 20 years to show Paraguayan Culture, restoring images and objects from the past. He was travelling with his wife to Encarnación, on February 28, 1981. They wanted to present the mythological images in curved wood during the carnival. But he died in a car accident on their way in San Luis.

In that place, as the Paraguayan Tradition states, there is a beauty and solemn cross made of bronze and big chains made of iron and pillars. It states: “Ramón Elías 1929–1981”.

Doña Elsa de Elías, his wife continued working on his project: The Museo Mitológico, which was built with a lot of sacrifice and dedication. He could only enjoy the museum for a short time: a year and some months.
