= Mbói Tu'ĩ =

Legendary beast of Guarani mythology

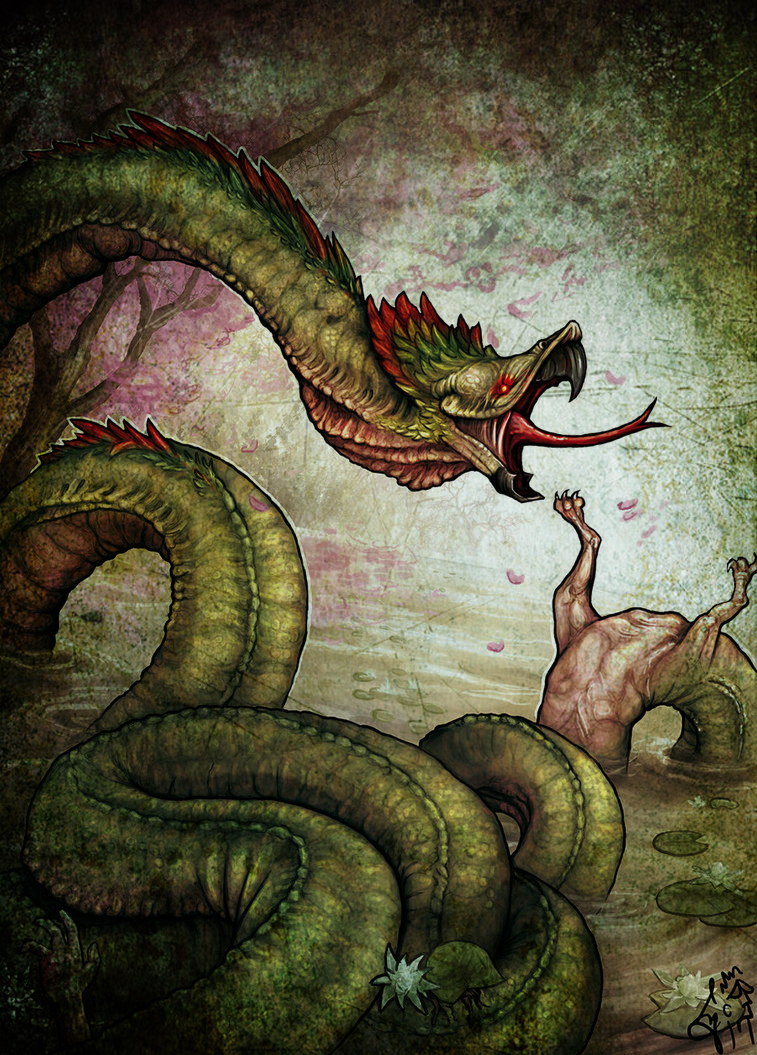
- An artistic depiction of Mboi Tu'i.

Creature information
- Family: Kerana (Mother); Tau (Father); Teju Jagua; Moñái; Jasy Jatere; Kurupi; Ao Ao; Luisón
- Folklore: Guaraní mythology

Mbói Tu'ĩ is one of seven legendary monster sons of Tau and Kerana in Guaraní mythology.

== Name and description ==
Mbói Tu'ĩ directly translates to "snake-parrot" or "serpent-parrot", which describes the morphology of the creature. It has two legs around the torso, the head of a parrot, the body of a serpent, and feathers on the head and back. It also has a long, red, forked tongue.

== Mythology ==
The goddess Arasy cursed Tau, after he kidnapped Kerana, that all of his children would be born at seven months and that all of them would transform into monsters.

Mbói Tu'ĩ is the second of Tau and Kerana's monstrous sons, and has the form of a enormous snake with the head and feathers of a parrot. It is frequently referred to as the ruler and protector of marshes and wetland life, as has the power to call illnesses and storms upon those that pollute or disrespect these. Mbói Tu'ĩ is also used as a Bogeyman by parents to warn children not to swim in dangerous backwater areas.

== See also ==
- Basilisco Chilote
- The Legend of Iguassu Falls: The Folklore, Mystery and Beauty C.W. Peters - the legend of how Iguassu was formed by the Serpentine God of the river - Mbói
