= Kurupi =

Figure in Guarani mythology

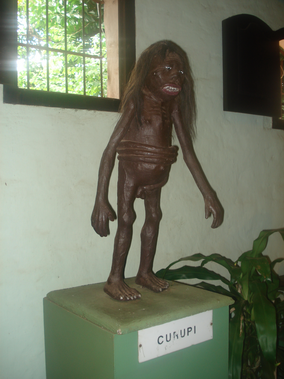
Statue of Curupi. ― Mythical Museum Ramón Elías, Capiatá, Paraguay

Curupi (Curupí) or Kurupi is a figure in Guaraní mythology, known particularly for an elongated penis that can wind once or several turns around the waist or torso, or wrap around its arms, and feared as the abductor and rapist of women.

He is one of the seven monstrous children of Tau and Kerana, and as such is one of the central legendary figures in the region of Guaraní speaking cultures. The curupí is one of the most widespread myth in the region. (Note: "Es éste uno de los mitos más difundidos en la región".)

== Myths ==
The modern so-called "Paraguayan" variety of Curupi/Kurupi is said to be short or small-bodied (like a child or be agéd), ugly, and hairy (or naked), and marked by its disproportionately long penis wrapped around the waist. This curupí's backward-pointing feet. will confuse anyone following its tracks and lead humans into the thicket or underbrush (which is also characteristic of the curupira). It is also regarded as a protector of nature.

The profile synthesized by Paulo de Carvalho Neto (1992) adds that it has bronze-tanned skin with black eyes and straight hair, (Note: "Bronzeado, de olhos negros cabeleira lisa".) while other sources give it "scaly skin" and large ears. (Note: "Curupí, que es un demonio de piel escamada, grandes orejas y pies para atrás".) According to some informants, it has the power of invisibility, and uses it as a form of defense, and kidnaps women and children using its penis as a lasso.

Other embellishments which have appeared are that it has a body without any joints (articulation), and that some consider it to be a duende with one hand made of lead and another hand made of wool.

=== Early record ===
The purported existence of the Curupi was logged in the 1793 diary of the explorer Juan Francisco Aguirre. Aguirre received information secondhand from a Friar Henrique Ruano who allegedly witnessed several Curupis who had been captured by the Mbayá people. These curupí were diminutive in size compared to ordinary humans, and had peculiar genitals:

"These [Curupis] are pygmies to the extreme, and their reproductive parts are extraordinary: for the female, her vulva forms a natural T figure, [like] the Roman letter; and for the male his "[male] member is so deformed that on his small body it extends once around the waist and reaches [the front]". (Note: Aguirre: "Son pigmeos en estremo y las partes generativas, extraordinarias: en la hembra hace la vulva una figura de T natural, caracter romano; y en el varon el miem-bro es tan disforme q[u]e alcanza en su pequeño cuerpo a dar una vuelta a la cintura". Partly quoted by Carvalho Neto (1956).)

Father Ruano (not Friar Ruano, the eyewitness) was one of those who considered the existence of the Curupí to be ridiculous, as did Aguirre himself, (Note: Aguirre introduces Curupi as rather like the stories about the "Guayaquiles" Indians, also said to be diminutive with monkey-like habits, which he deemed preposterous.) having understood the Curupi to be another (fabulous) tribe of deformed Indians.

=== Elongated phallus ===
Curupí's most distinctive feature is the penis which could wrap once around the waist, as attested by Aguirre in 1793. (Note: Carvalho Neto (1956) citing his own yet unpublished Folklore del Paraguay (1961))

While the long penis feature and identification as a fertility symbol (Note: e.g., Alvarez (2002): "Kurupi es el que tiene un falo que se lía por su cuerpo. Símbolo de la fecundidad y secuestrador de mujeres (Kurupi is the one with a phallus that wraps around his body. Symbol of fertility and kidnapper of women)".) is ubiquitous in written sources, only a small percentage of Guaraní informants elocuted to the Curupí being equipped with such "a long penis which he can twine around his arm", according to a 1977 statistical study by Martha Blache. (Note: That is to say, of 26 respondents, only 16 (62%) even knew of the Curupí, and only two (8%) gave the long penis response. It is also noted "most informants who evinced a desire to disown their Indian heritage".)

The poet Eloy Fariña Nuñez (1926) has attested to the lore that the Curupí binds (enlazar) or lassos women with his elongated penis, and the women are able to make a getaway by cutting it off. (Note: Fariña Nuñez (1926a) "Los mitos guaraníes". Revista do Instituto historico e geographico brasileiro. Tomo special: Congresso internacional de historia da America (1922), 2: 311–331", quoted by Basílio de Magalhães (1928) reprinted Fariña Nuñez (1926b), p. 215.) The Curupí loses all his special powers when that happens, because that is where his source of power lies.

On the authority of Fariña Nuñez, it is extrapolated that this penis must be long enough to wrap around the body several times. Thus in the modern exaggerated telling, Kurupi's humongous penis winds several times around his waist like a belt.

=== Absence of phallic exaggeration ===
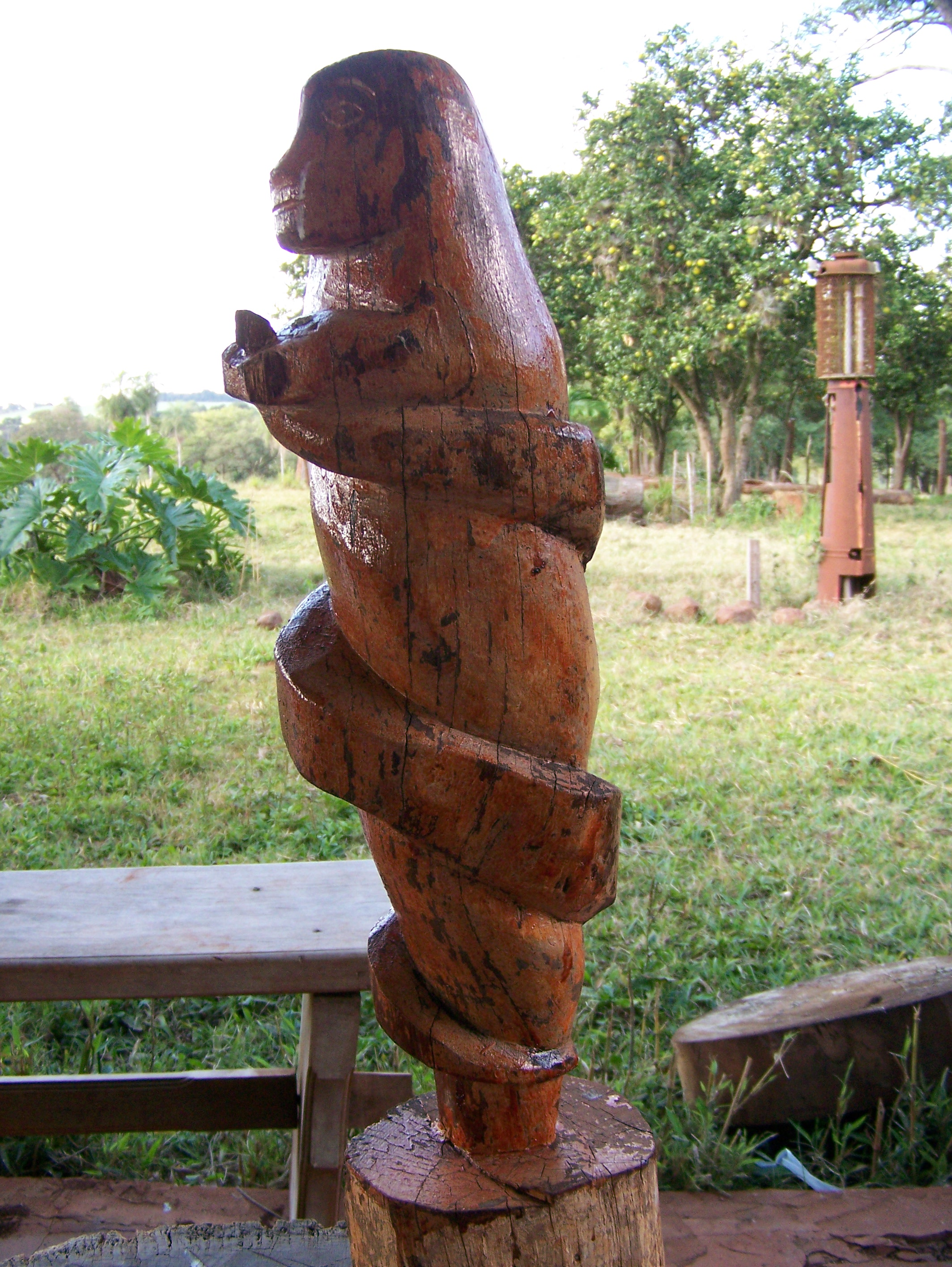
Pai Tavytera woodcarving of a Curupi (or perhaps rather the Mboguá Vusú). ―Amambay Dept., Paraguay

Not all indigenous peoples ascribe this extraordinary size or length to the phallus of the Curupi. As aforementioned, the 1977 study found only a couple of informants familiar with this stereotype.

In fact, the qualification "Kurupi of Paraguay" (paraguayo) has been used to denote the Kurupi with the attached attribute (of the exaggerated penis). Cf. § Kurupi of the Guianas

Anthropologist Alfred Métraux referred to the curupí without any such mention. Nor is the elongated penis part of the profile of the Curupi among the Mbyá Guaraní people.

For the Paï-Cayuä (Pai Tavytera) people of the Ypané River basin, Paraguay, the Curupi, often called ipiry, is not a phallic figure either, but is a guardian of wild beasts. For these people, the Curupi counterpart is called Mboguá Vusú, who has such a large penis he can only cohabit with females of his own kind. It is more fully called Mboguá Vusú ñe-mo-mitä meaning "Great Mboguá who becomes a child". The term "Mboguá" is not a native Pai word, but borrowed from Mbayá and means something like "demon".

=== Abductor ===
Kurupi, one of seven monstrous siblings (cf. § Children of Tau and Kerana), is the kidnapper of women. The Kurupi is often blamed for unexpected or unwanted pregnancies.

Kurupi's penis is said to be prehensile, and owing to its length he is supposed to be able to extend it through doors, windows, or other openings in a home and impregnate a sleeping woman without even having to enter the house. Kurupi was a scapegoat used by adulterous women to avoid the wrath of their husbands, and by single women to explain their pregnancies, including in cases of rape. Children fathered by the Kurupi were expected to be small, ugly and hairy much like their father, and if male to inherit something of their father's virility. In some cases, Kurupi is blamed with the disappearance of young women, supposedly stealing them away to his home in the forest for use in satiating his libidinous desires (rape).

Nowadays, the legend of Kurupi has faded somewhat, and figures more often as part of old tales. Rarely is he blamed with impregnating women anymore, although he is sometimes used to try and frighten young girls into being chaste.

=== Protector or prankster ===
While for some the curupí is nothing more than a terrible satyr that abducts maidens and teens (guainas) who wander into the jungle in the night, or at noon-tide. (Note: Encounters at "noon" elocuted by informants in 1977 study also.) But according to others, the curupí is a guardian spirit of the love-stricken man and the pregnant woman who blindly follows him. While the pregnant woman is in transit through the forest, the curupí keeps spiders, vipers, and wild beasts at bay.

Still others characterize the curupí as a playful mischievous spirit, along the lines of a Perú Rimá or Pedro Urdemales.

=== Parallels ===
The curupí may just be a sub-class of curupira, as it has been suggested that the name "Curupí" is merely a contraction of "Curú-piré" meaning "pimply-skinned" by Basílio de Magalhães (1928).

Kurupi is said to be somewhat similar in appearance to another creature, the Pombero, said to be hairy with reversed feet. Pombero is also part of Guarani tradition, and also held responsible for impregnating women unbeknownst to the victims.

The Jasy Jatere (var. jasyjateré) is another creature likened to it.

=== Children of Tau and Kerana ===
According to Guaraní mythology Kurupi was one of seven offspring engendered by the evil spirit Tau who abducted Kerana, daughter of Marangatú and begot seven monstrous sietemesinos, i.e., children born after only 7 months of gestation: Teju Jagua, Mbói Tu'ĩ, Moñái, most famously Jasy Jatere, then Kurupi, Ao Ao and the dog Luison.

== Curuzú-yeguá ritual ==
The creature Curupí is believed to be closely associated with the Guaraní ritual of the curuzú-yeguá (Guaraní: "adorned cross"). The notion that curuzú-yeguá originated as a pre-Christian ancient cult of Curupí was espoused by Goicoechea Menéndez and Natalicio González (1938?) (Note: Cadogan (1961), p. 40 citing Carvalho Neto (1956), pp. 266–269. Earlier citing Natalicio González (1948) [1938?] Proceso y formación de la cultura paraguaya) In the ritual, a cross is decorated with manioc flour bread called chipás. Enough is baked to go around to all attendees, who choose to eat breads of various shape like ladders and snakes. Carvalho Neto psychoanalyzes these as phallic symbols, i.e., more modest representations of the Curupí which can take on a more overtly sexual form.

== Kurupi of the Guianas ==
There are also spirits called the Kurupi or Kulupi known to the Kaliña people of the Guianas, characterized by a large scrotum. It has a protruding forehead that prevents it from looking upward (cf. Cabeça de Cuia). It is hairy all over, with flowing long hair trailing behind; it has clawed fingers and toes, feet turned backward, and "in the place of buttocks [he] has a fire-hearth with glowing embers". The Kurupi roaming the forests noisily "kicks or knocks the tree buttresses". (cf. curupira § Sounds and smell re sapopema). It can raise strong gusts of wind when angered and is considered the lord of winds by the Kaliña (cf. saci) (Note: Note that Basílio de Magalhães (1928)'s commentary on Curupí is placed under the section on "Sacy".). The spirit is recorded as Kalupi in Suriname and is capable of endowing blessing of the hunt and fishing.

Goeje considered this Kurupi to be a cognate of the curupira of the Tupi people of Brazil, etc.

The "Marana ywa" among the Tenetehara is also said to be a cognate, as it is described as a small man with enormous testicles. (Note: Zerries, citing Wagley-Calvão (1949), p.102.)

=== Other phallic parallels ===
The Hebu spirits of the Warao people of Western Guayana also are said to be gifted with scrotal enormity. (Note: Zerries, citing Roth (1915), p.173.) The Hebu spirit also possesses, in the place of buttocks, a "fire-hearth with glowing embers", earning them the nickname Huta-kurakura or "Red-back". Hence the "Hebu" and the "Kurupi" of the Guyanas are considered completely equivalent.

The Ýoši spirit of the Selknam on Tierra del Fuego also has an abnormally large phallus, (Note: Zerries, citing Gusinde (1931), pp. 997–998.) while the Kamiri, a forest spirit of the Apurinã people, has an penis only 1 centimeter long. (Note: Zerries, citing Ehrenreich (1891), pp. 67–68.)

== In popular art ==
Ernesto Morales has written a cycle of works on the Curupí theme, entitled "Amante generoso", "El Curupí y la mujer curiosa", "El Curupí buen amigo", etc.

== See also ==
- Curupira – Mythological creature in Tupi–Guarani folklore
- Trauco – Humanoid creature in Chilota mythology
- Pombero – Legendary monster from South America
- Jasy Jatere – Figure in Guaraní mythology
- Indio Pícaro – Traditional Chilean statuette
- Priapus – Greek god of fertility and male genitalia
