= Guarani mythology =

The Guarani mythology is the set of narratives about the gods and spirits of the different Tupi-Guarani peoples, ancient and current. Together with the cosmogonies, anthropogonies and rituals, they form part of the religion of these peoples.

The Guarani people live in the south-central part of South America, especially in Paraguay and parts of the surrounding areas of Argentina, Brazil, and Bolivia. The Tupi people were one of the most numerous peoples indigenous to Brazil, occupying largely the Atlantic coast of Brazil and In the Amazon where there are Tupi towns with no connection to the outside, heavily mixing with the Portuguese colonizers.

== Overview ==
There exist no written records of the ancient myths and legends associated with the Guarani people. The Guarani language was not a written language until modern times, so their religious beliefs have largely been passed down through word of mouth. As such, accounts of the various gods and related myths and legends can vary from one locale to the next, and the regional differences may be so extreme as to completely redefine the role a specific deity plays in the Guarani belief system.

Although many of the indigenous Guarani people have been assimilated into modern society and their belief system altered or replaced by Christianity (due in large part to the work of Jesuit missionaries in the 16th century), several of the core beliefs are still active in many rural areas in the Guarani region. As a result, the myths and legends continue to evolve to this day.

== Guarani creation myth ==
The primary figure in most Guarani creation legends is Tupã, the supreme god of all creation. With the help of the moon goddess Arasy, Tupã descended upon the Earth in a location specified as a hill in the region of Areguá, and from that location created all that is found upon the face of the earth, including the ocean, forests, and the animals. It is also said that the stars were placed in the sky at this point.

Tupã then created humanity (according to most Guarani myths, the Guarani were naturally the first race of people to be made, with every other civilization being born from it) in an elaborate ceremony, forming clay statues of man and woman with a mixture of various elements from nature. After breathing life into the human forms, he left them with the spirits of good and evil and departed.

== Early humanity ==
The original humans created by Tupã were Rupave and Sypave, whose names mean "Father of the people" and "Mother of the people", respectively. The pair had three sons and a large but unspecified number of daughters. The first of their sons was Tumé Arandú, considered to be the wisest of men and the great prophet of the Guarani people. Second of their sons was Marangatú, a benevolent and generous leader of his people, and father of Kerana, the mother of the seven legendary monsters of Guarani myth (see below). Their third son was Japeusá, who was from birth considered a liar, a thief and a trickster, always doing things backwards to confuse people and take advantage of them. He eventually committed suicide, drowning himself in the water, but he was resurrected as a crab, and since then all crabs are cursed to walk backwards much as Japeusá did.

Among the daughters of the Rupave and Supave was Porâsý, notable for sacrificing her own life in order to rid the world of one of the seven legendary monsters, diminishing their power (and thus the power of evil as a whole).

Several of the first humans were considered to have ascended upon their deaths and become minor deities.

== Seven legendary monsters ==
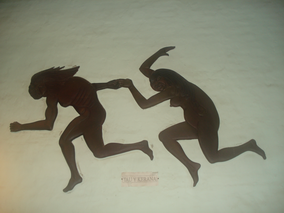
Tau pursued by Kerana

Kerana, the beautiful daughter of Marangatu, was captured by the personification or spirit of evil called Tau. Together the two had seven sons who were cursed of the high goddess Arasy, and all but one were born as hideous monsters. The seven are considered primary figures in Guarani mythology, and while several of the lesser gods or even the original humans are forgotten in the verbal tradition of some areas, these seven were generally maintained in the legends. Some of them are even believed in down to modern times in some rural areas. The seven sons of Tau and Kerana are, in order of their births:

- Teju Jagua, god or spirit of caverns and fruits
- Mbói Tu'ĩ, god of waterways and aquatic creatures
- Moñái, god of the open fields. He was defeated by the sacrifice of Porâsý
- Jasy Jatere, god of the yerba mate plant and also of the siesta, only of the seven to not appear as a monster
- Kurupi, god of sexuality and fertility
- Ao Ao, god of hills and mountains
- Luison (or Luisõ), god of death and all things related to it

== Other gods or important figures ==
- Angatupyry, spirit or personification of good, opposite to Tau
- Pytajovái, god of war
- Pombero, a popular spirit of mischief
- Abaangui, a god credited with the creation of the moon; may only figure as an adaptation of outlying Guarani tribes
- Jurupari, a god limited to worship by men, generally limited to isolated tribes in Brazil
- Jande Jari, "our grandmother", spirit of the river Parapetí in Bolivia
- Plata Yvyguy, (Buried Treasure): many treasures were buried during the Paraguayan War, there is a tradition that if someone is to see a headless white dog that disappears and re-appears all the time in their own house, it means that Plata Yvyguy is buried under it.
- The Celestial Jaguar: According to a version of the legend, the mother of the heavenly twins, known as Sun and Moon, was killed by the Celestial Jaguars. The twins were raised by the jaguars until a bird told them how their mother had been killed. The twins went on a rampage, killing all jaguars except one which was pregnant and the mother of today's primitive jaguars. Now, jaguars are a wild beast that are to be feared by the Guarani. It is common for the animal to be part of the beginning and end of a person's life. The meat will be eaten by a child's mother while she is pregnant and the jaguars themselves represent the souls of the dead in temples. Those that are sick, elderly, and slow-moving have also been known to have been left behind to the jaguars.
- Mala Visión, She appears as a beautiful woman with a tree‑like body. She wanders through forests, announcing her presence with sharp, echoing cries. Anyone who dares to answer her call draws her closer, moving in a zigzag. When provoked three times, she attacks and kills the victim. She is known to punish unfaithful men with brutal retribution.
