= Amantikir Park =

Garden in Brazil

Coordinates: 22°47′S 45°36′W

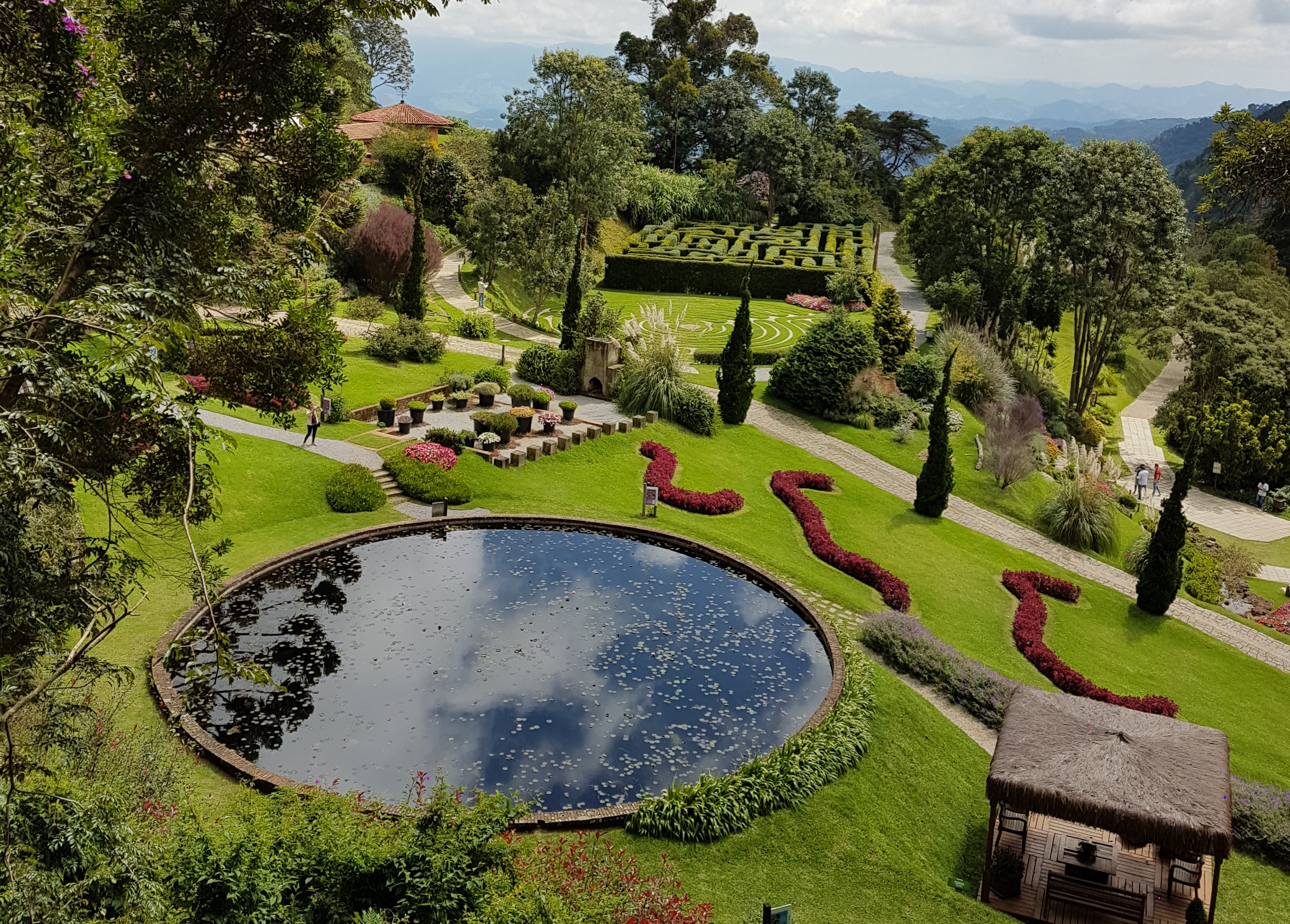
Aerial view of the WaterMirror

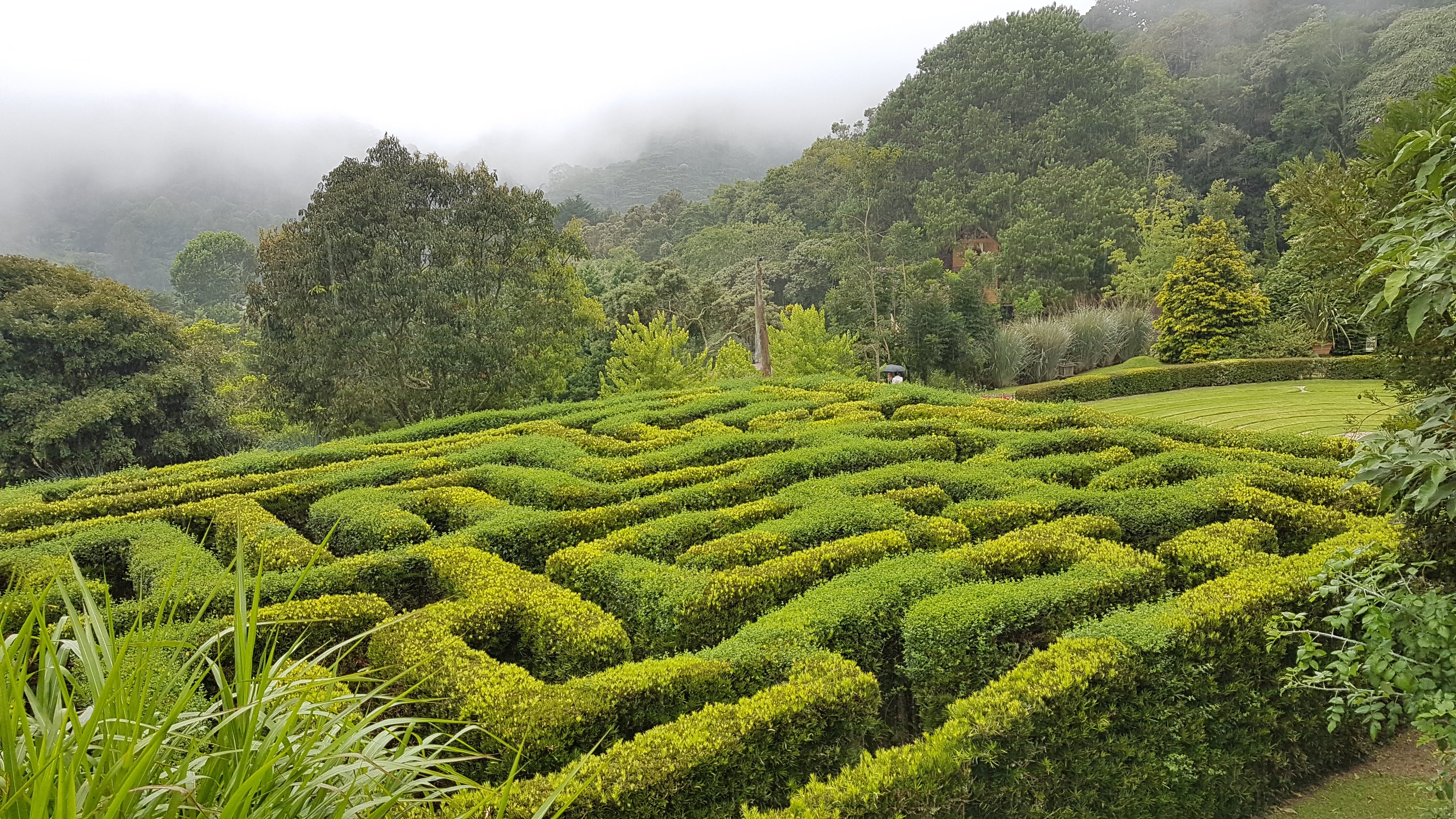
View of the Classical Labirinth

Amantikir Park or Amantikir Gardens (Portuguese: Parque Amantikir or Amantikir Jardins) is a park that includes a set of gardens and several points of interest. Located in the municipality of Campos do Jordão, 180 kilometres (110 mi) northeast of the Brazilian city of São Paulo, the park is visited by thousands of tourists annually.

The park was designed by the landscaper and agricultural engineer Walter Vasconcellos, known as Dr. Garden, and is home to more than 700 species of plants in 26 gardens across its 60,000 square metres (650,000 sq ft). In 2013, TripAdvisor certified Amantikir for the first time as the attractive No. 1 of Campos do Jordão, a position in which the park has maintained itself ever since.

The park and the city of Campos do Jordão are located in the Mantiqueira Mountains, a mountain range considered the 8th most "irreplaceable" protected natural formation on the planet, according to an article by the International Union for Conservation of Nature published in 2013 by Science Magazine.

== Etymology ==
The region of the Mantiqueira Mountains was known by the Tupi people as amantikir, which means "mountains that cry", referring to a large number of springs and streams found there. Later the name became Mantiqueira in Portuguese.

== History ==
Born in Campos do Jordão and passionate about the city, the landscaper and agricultural engineer Walter Vasconcellos, after visiting dozens of parks and gardens in Europe, United States, and Canada, always returned from vacation with the feeling that his city deserved a space as charming as those he had visited. It seemed unfair to him that not even the owners of the gardens, to whom he provided services as Dr. Garden, had the opportunity to enjoy the fullness of such beautiful gardens.

This concern was essential for the seed of the idea of a garden open to the public germinate. Built-in an area that previously housed Haras Serra Azul, Dr. Garden's dream gained strength with the financial contribution of friends and customers. On August 25, 2007, Amantikir was born and after more than a decade of history, the park has received thousands of visitors from different parts of the world.

== Legend ==
A legend has it that the Sun fell in love with a beautiful Indian and she also fell in love with him. So the jealous Moon went to mourn with the god Tupã who placed an imposing mountain on the Indian, imprisoning her forever. Since then, the Indian has been crying for days and nights longing for the Sun and her waters fill the mountain veins, overflowing in the rivers and waterfalls that flow through the Mantiqueira Mountains. That's why the Tupi called it amantikir, the crying mountain.

== Attractions ==
In addition to the park's 26 gardens, other points of interest include: Zen Patio, the Tori, the Meda, the Chinese Dragon, the Moon Gate, the Mandala, the Pottery, the Belvedere, the Wood, the Vegetable Garden, the Large Vases, the Tent, the Picture Frame and the Tree House. All of these spaces have varied architectural references.

=== Classical Labirinth ===
Among the gardens of the amantikir park is the Classic Maze, similar to the hedge maze seen in castle gardens in Europe. It has an area of 450 square metres (4,800 sq ft) and 600 metres (0.37 mi) of corridors, with walls 2.20 metres (7.2 ft) high.

=== Grass Labirinth ===
The Amantikir's grass maze is considered by a group of scholars and labyrinth locators around the world, the largest grass maze in Brazil and is among the largest in the world of this type.

== Sectors ==
Amantikir's 26 gardens are divided into seven sectors and are inspired by different parks around the world, with scenic features from countries such as England, France, Germany, Austria, Spain, Italy, United States, Canada, Mexico, Japan and China, among others.

Sector	Garden	Number
Grey	Japanese Garden	1
Grey	Chinese Garden	2
Grey	Bromeliads Trail	26
Lilac	Romantic Garden	3
Lilac	Shade Garden	4
Orange	Bridge's Pond	5
Orange	Fall Colour Garden	6
Orange	Green Carpet	7
Orange	Greenhouse	8

Sector	Garden	Number
Green	Rock Garden	9
Green	Grass Labirinth	10
Green	Classical Labirinth	11
Green	English Garden	12
Red	Belvedere	13
Red	Dry Garden	14
Red	Roots Garden	15
Red	Grass Garden	16
Red	Pine Garden	17

Sector	Garden	Number
Yellow	FlowerSteps	18
Blue	Salzburg Gardens	19
Blue	Outdoor Fireplace	20
Blue	French Garden	21
Blue	School Garden	22
Blue	WaterMirror	23
Blue	German Garden	24
Blue	Author's Garden	25

== Gallery ==
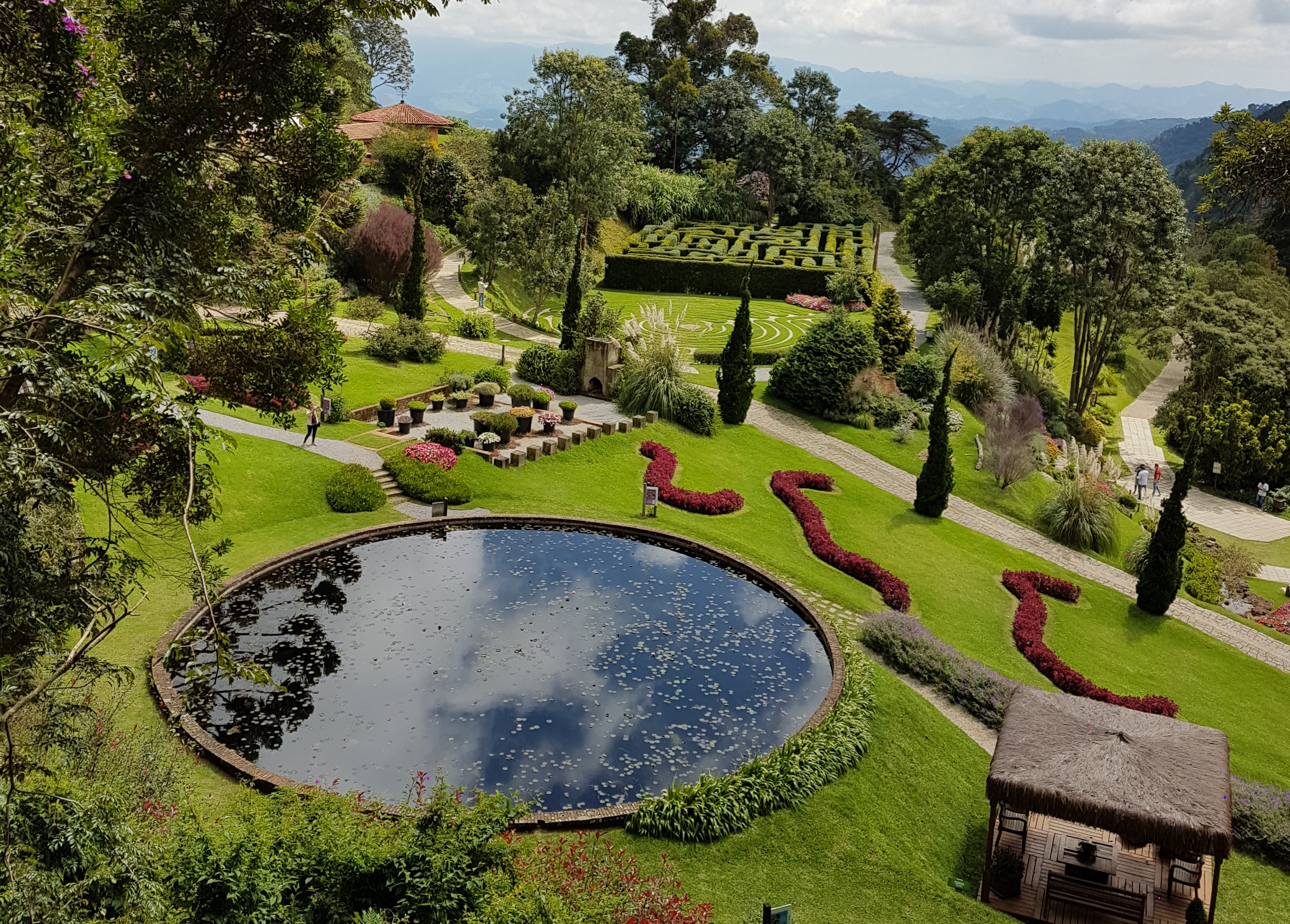

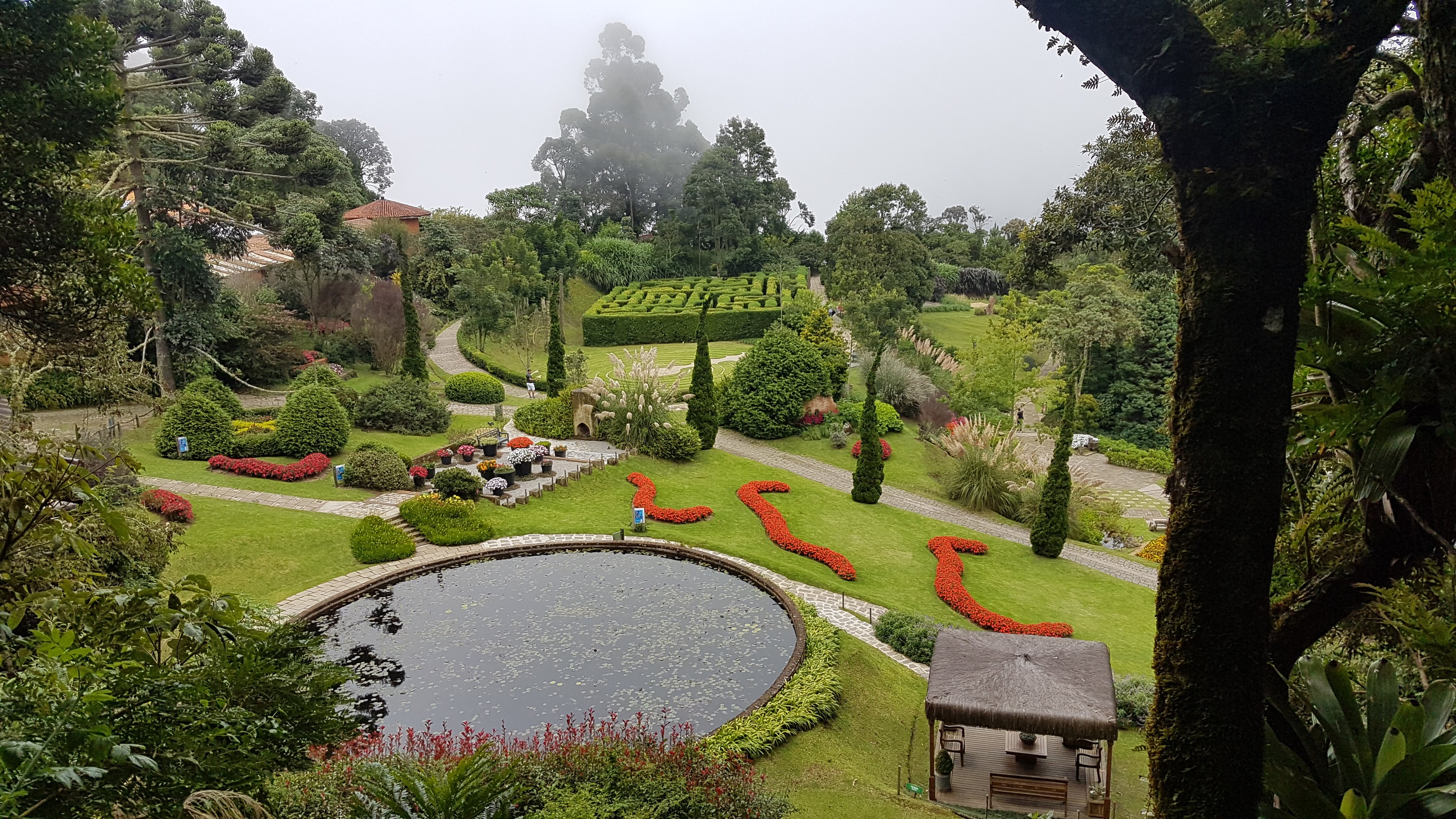

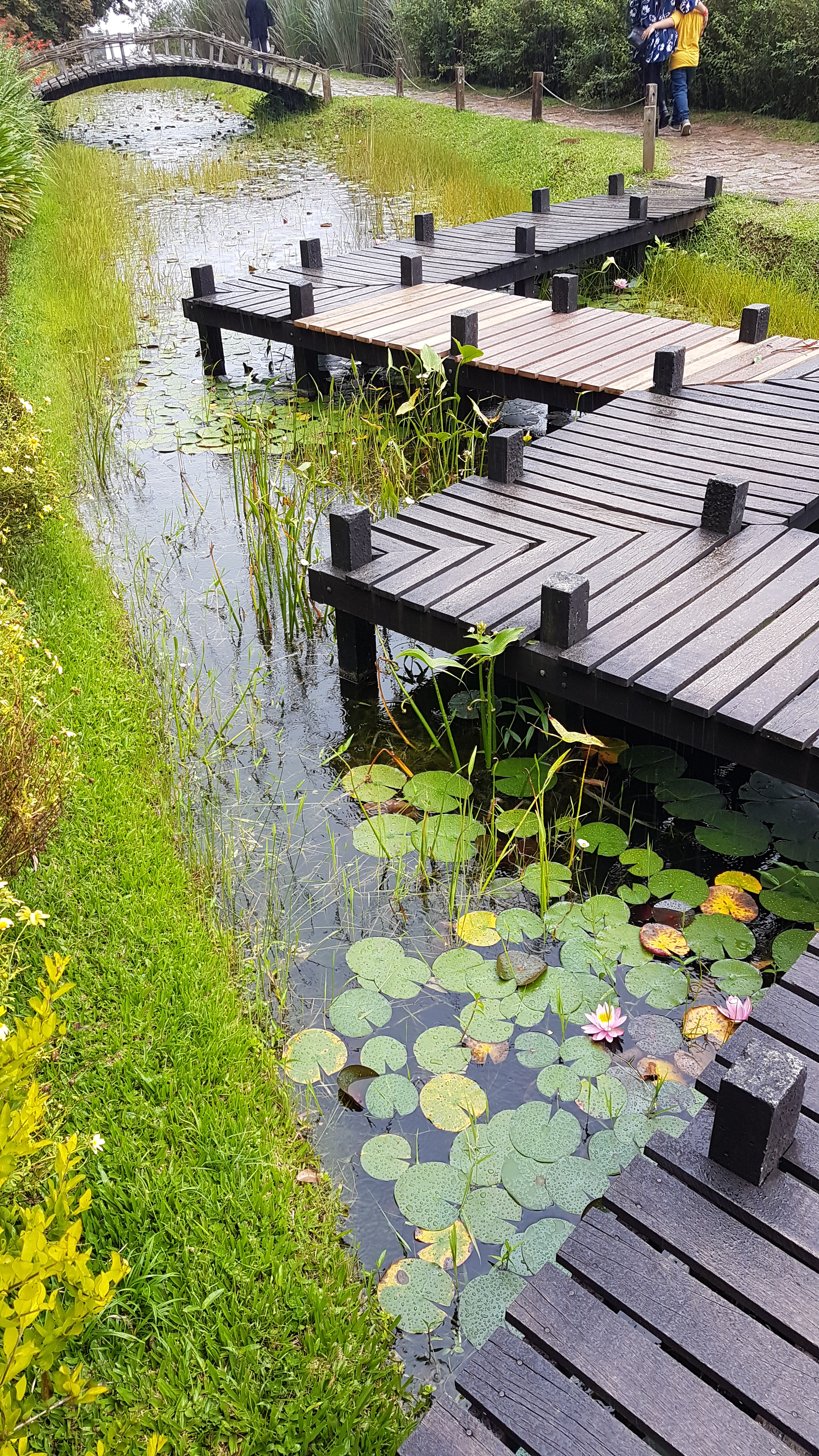

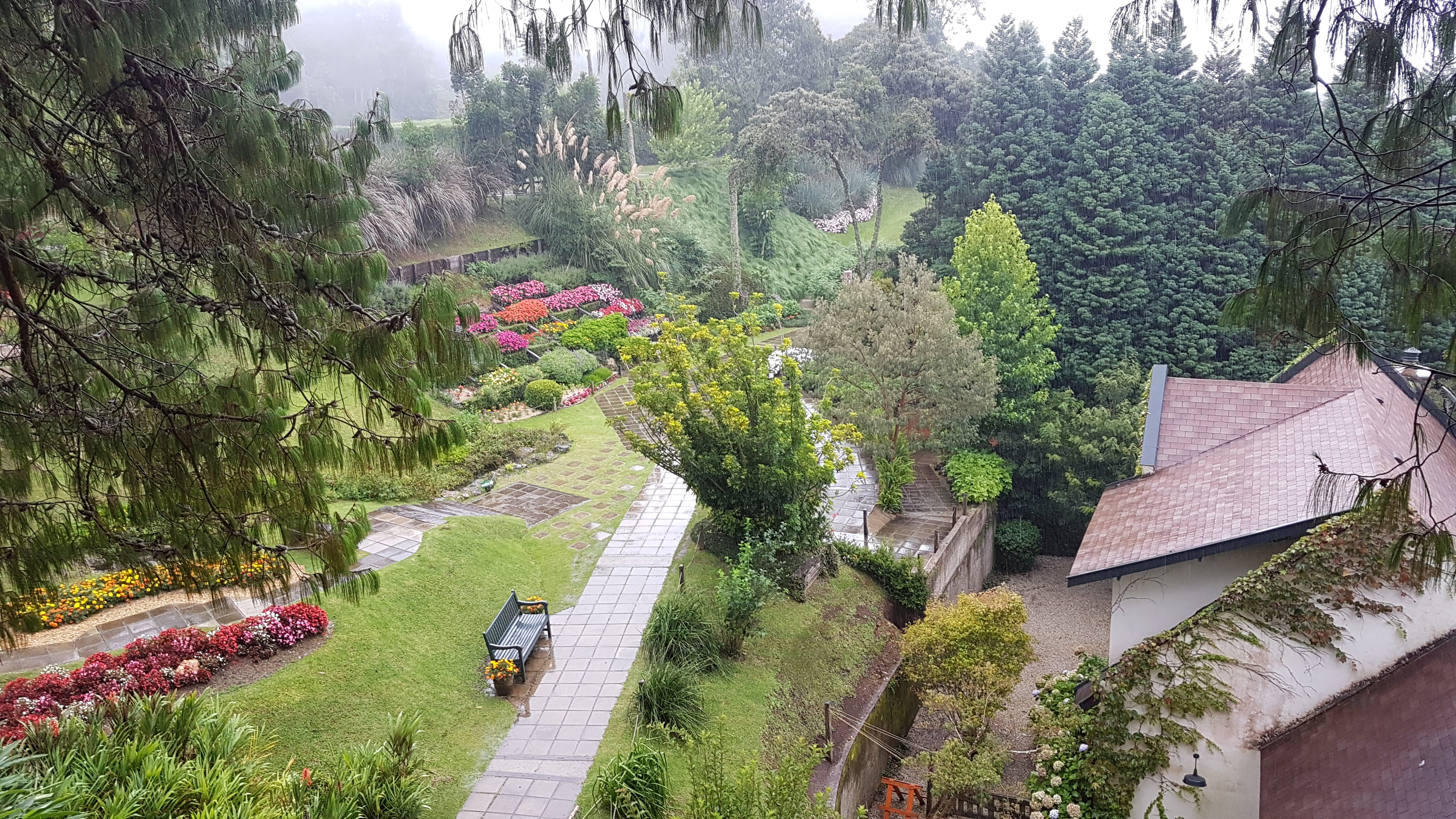

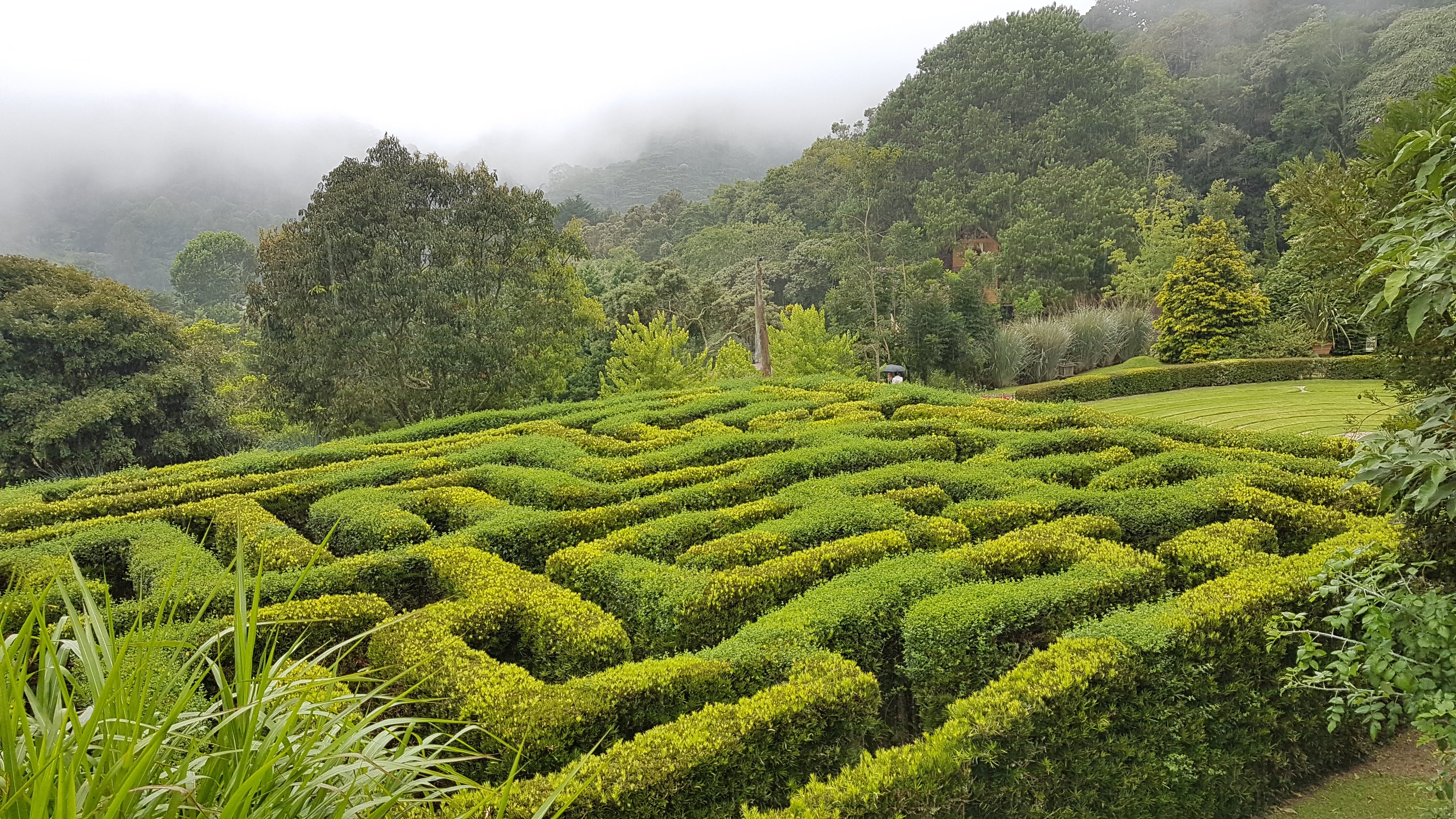

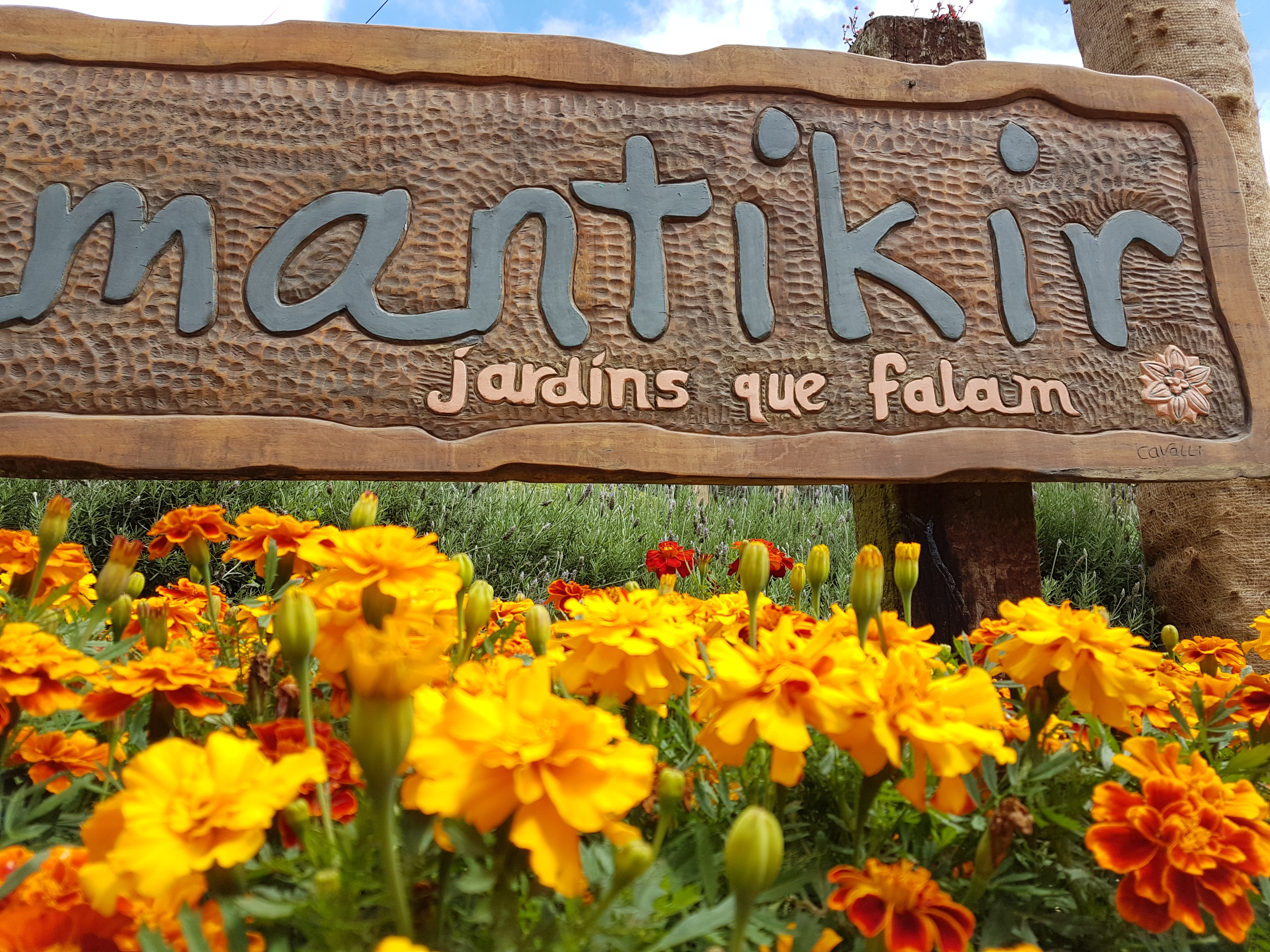

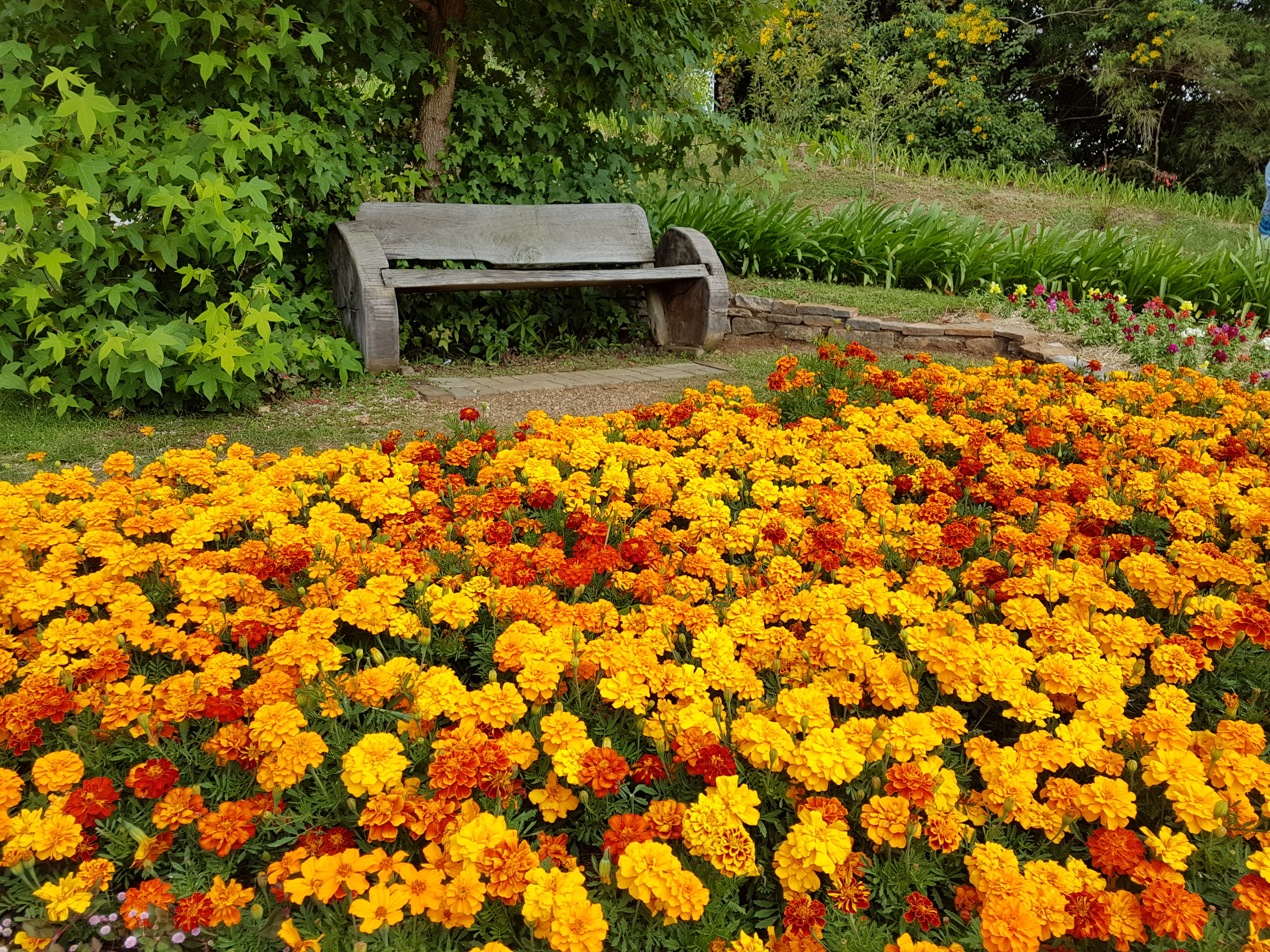

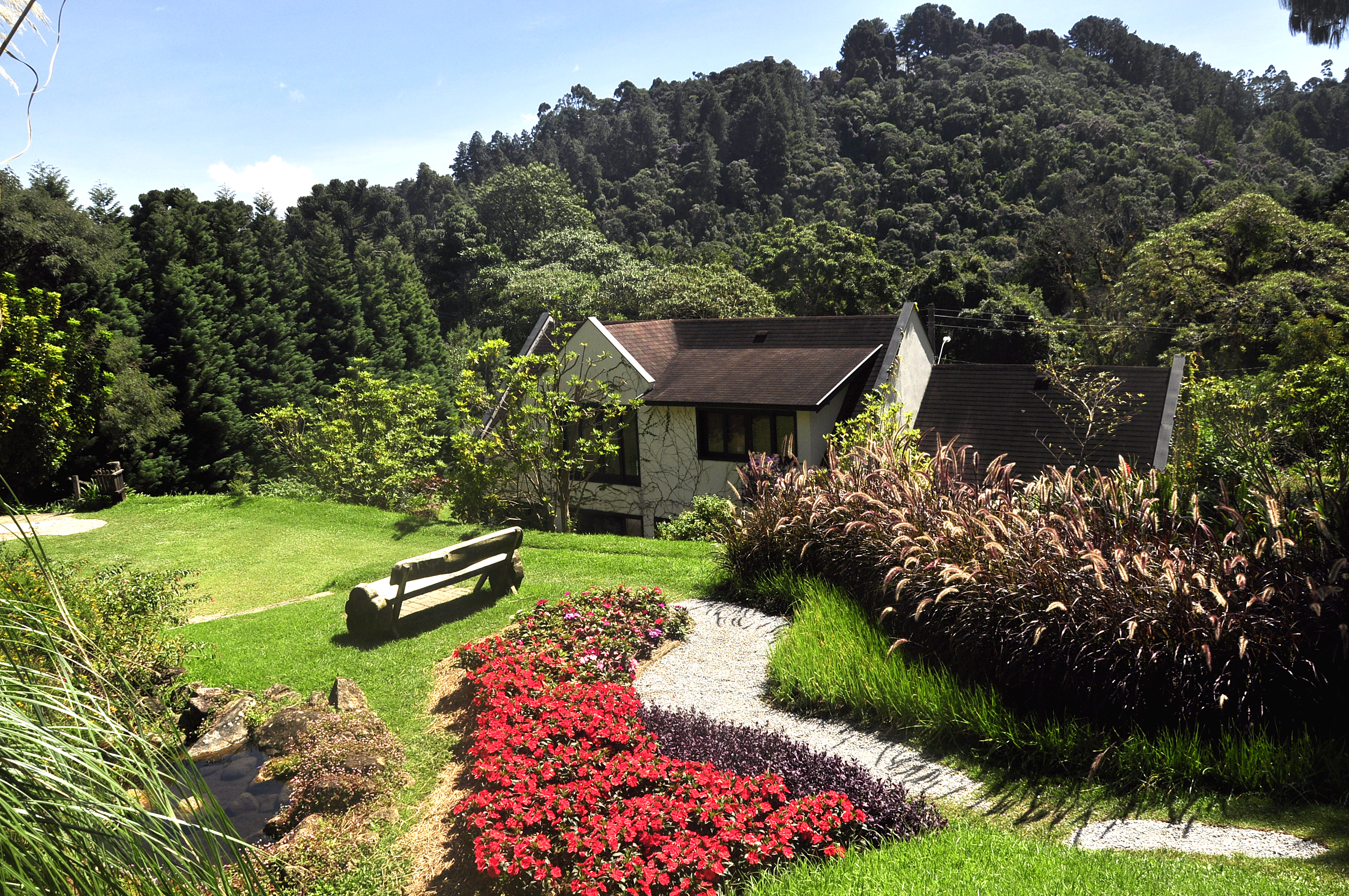

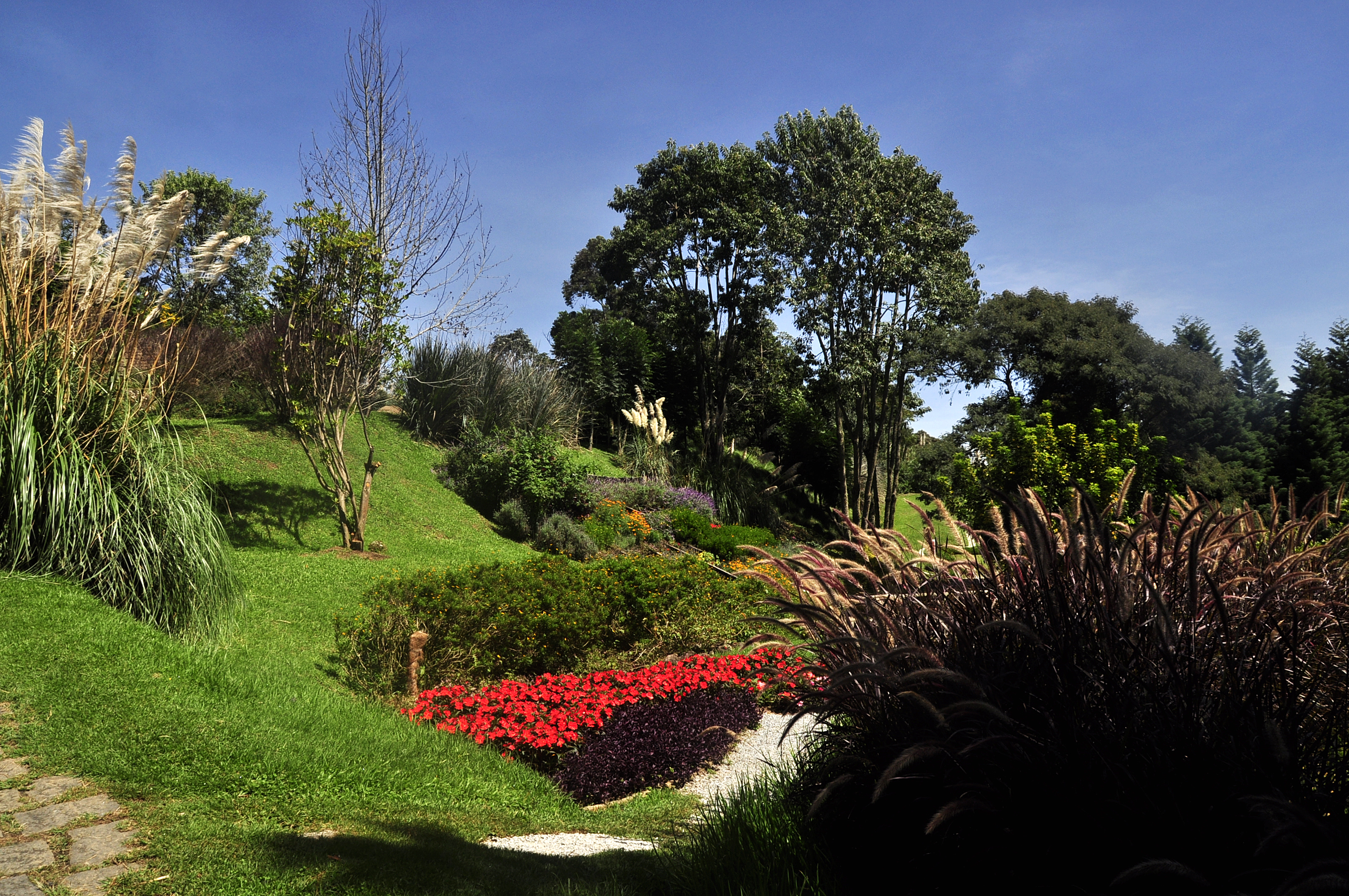

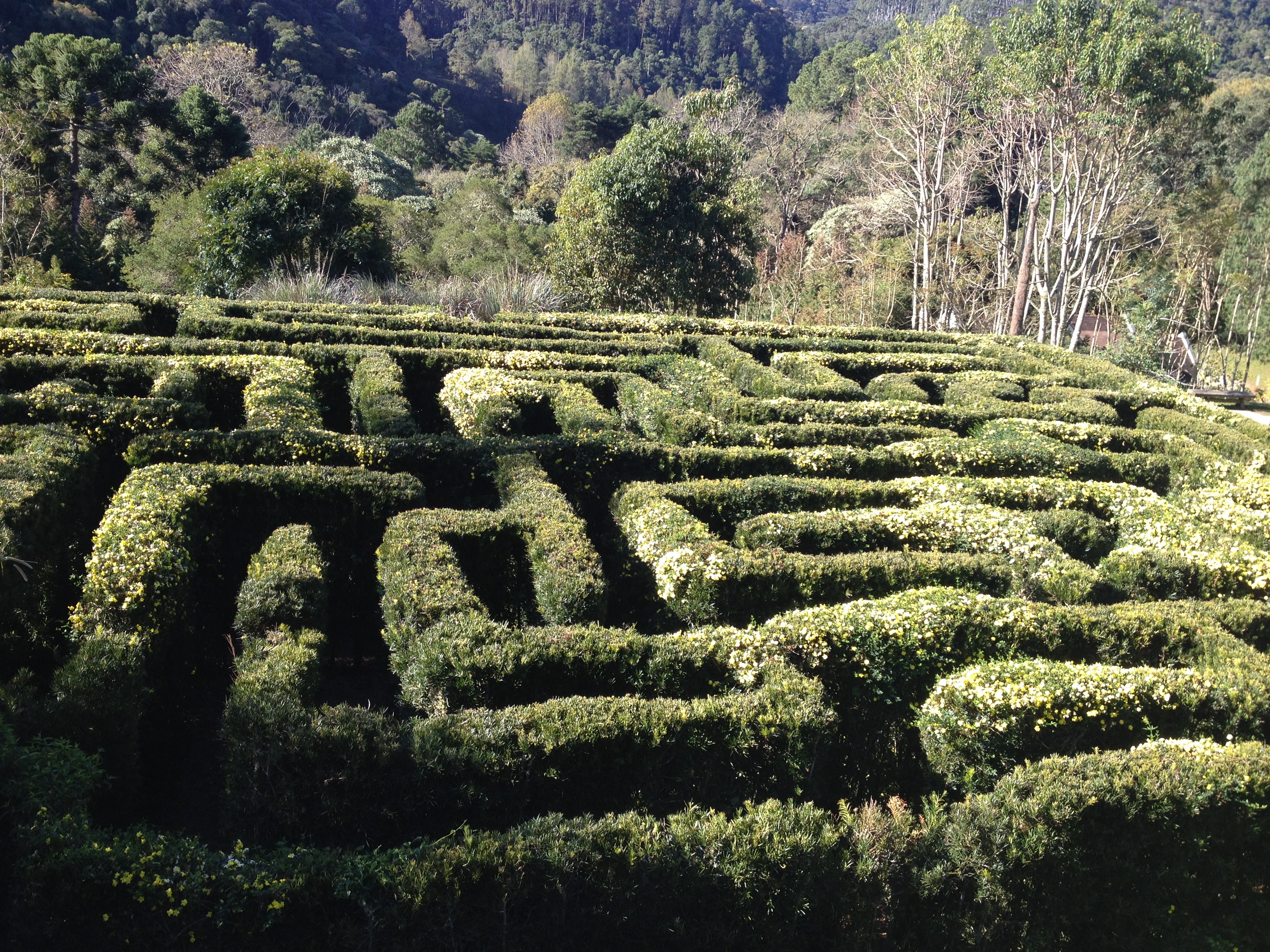

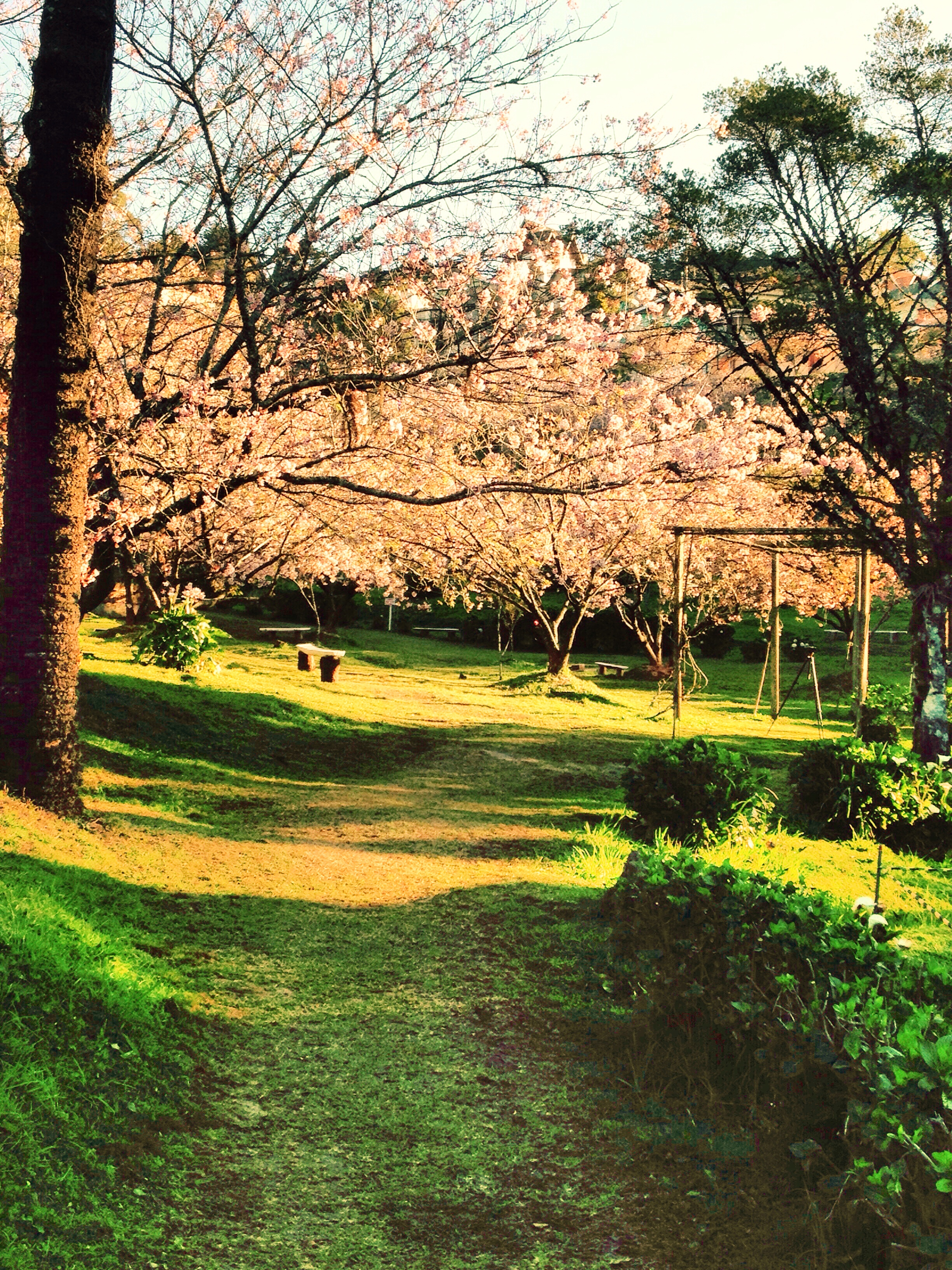

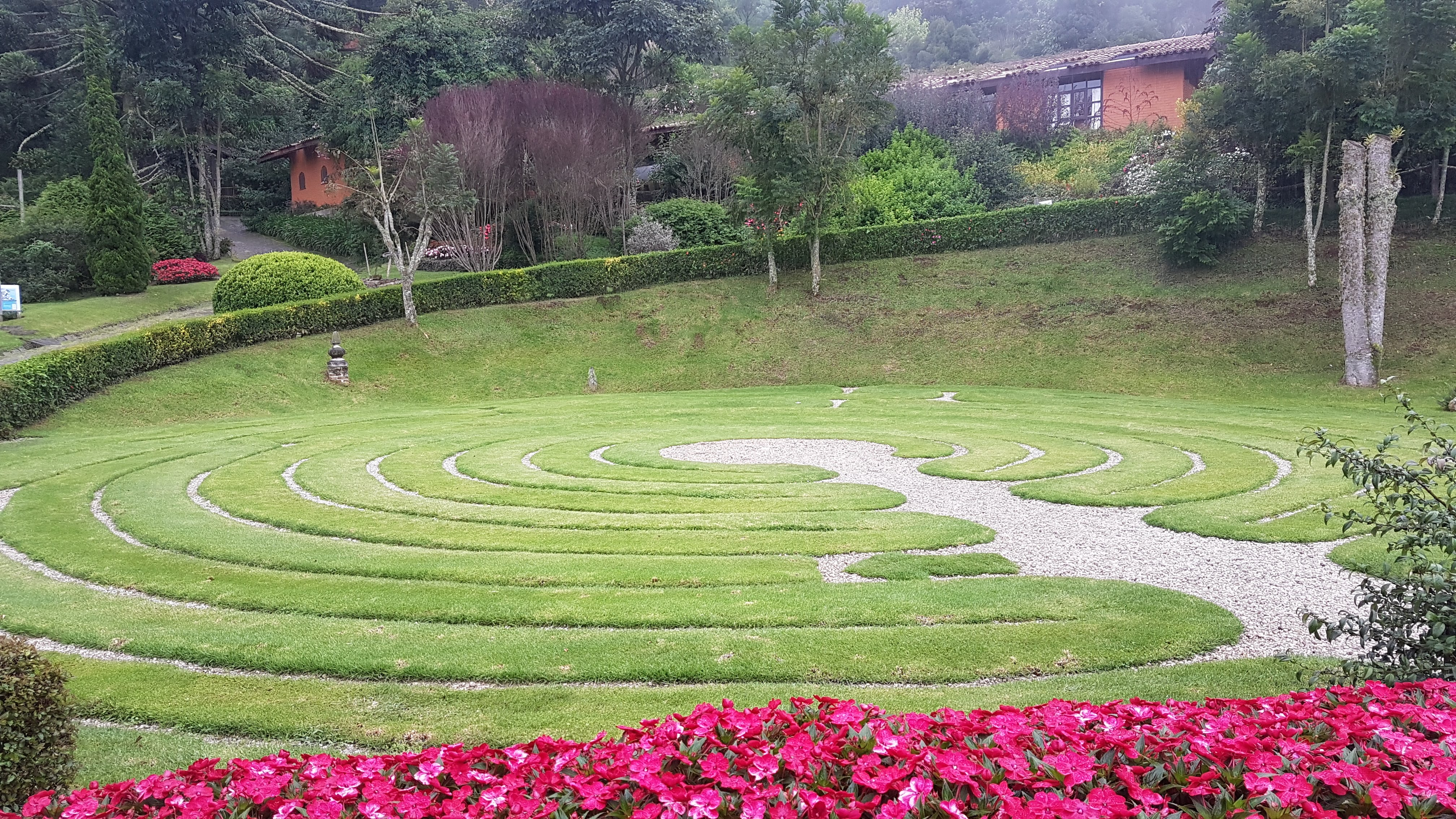

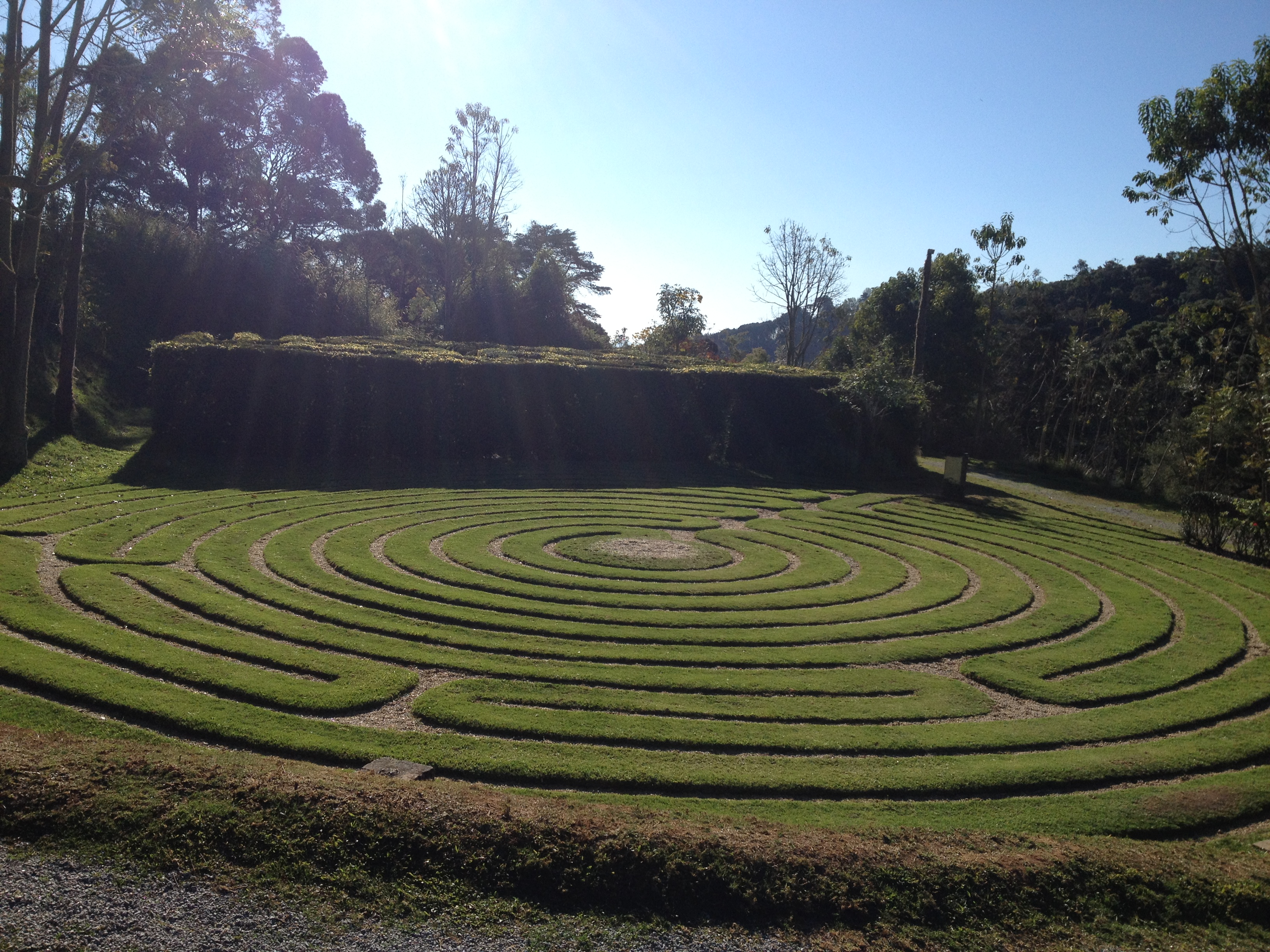

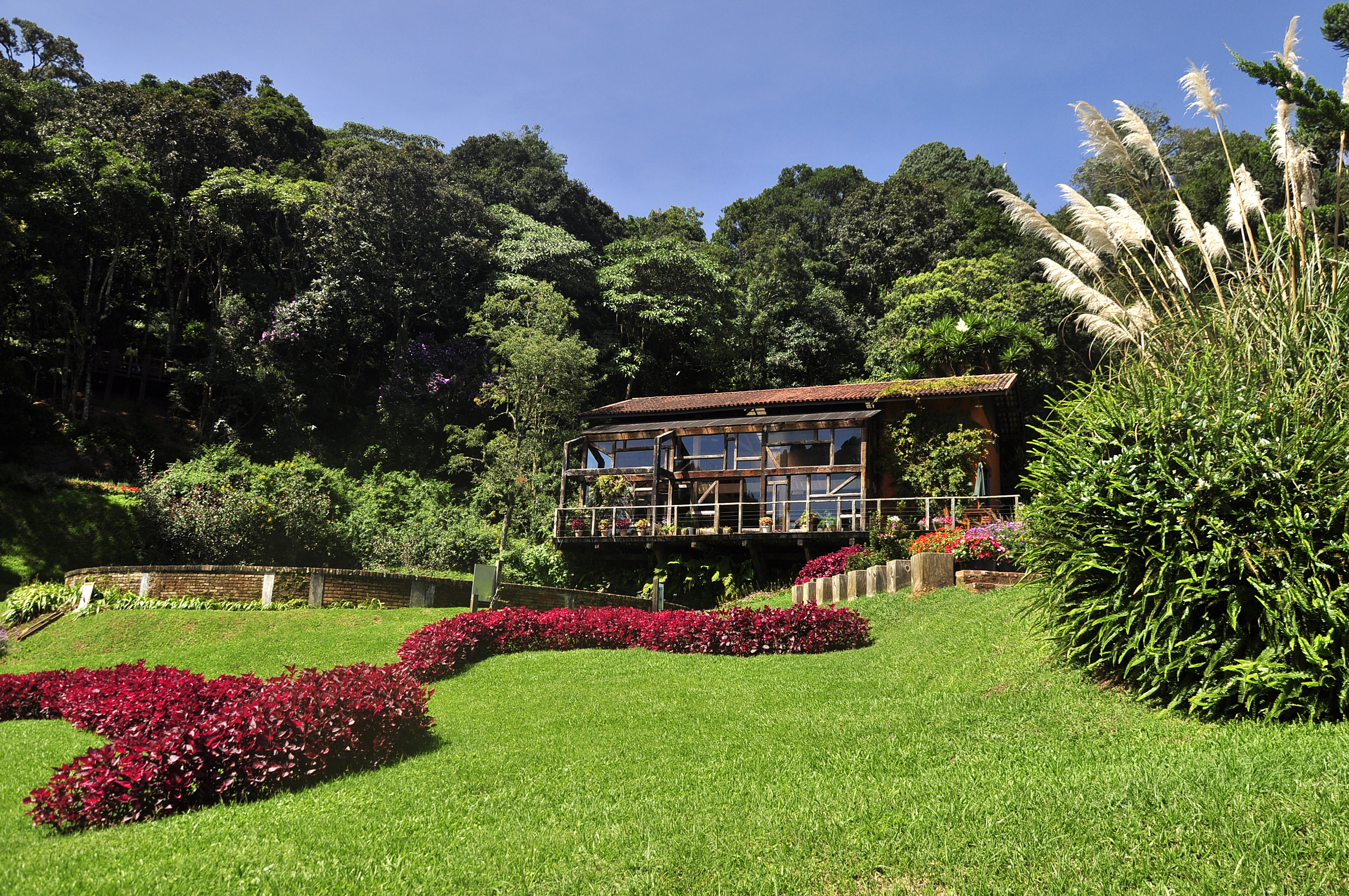

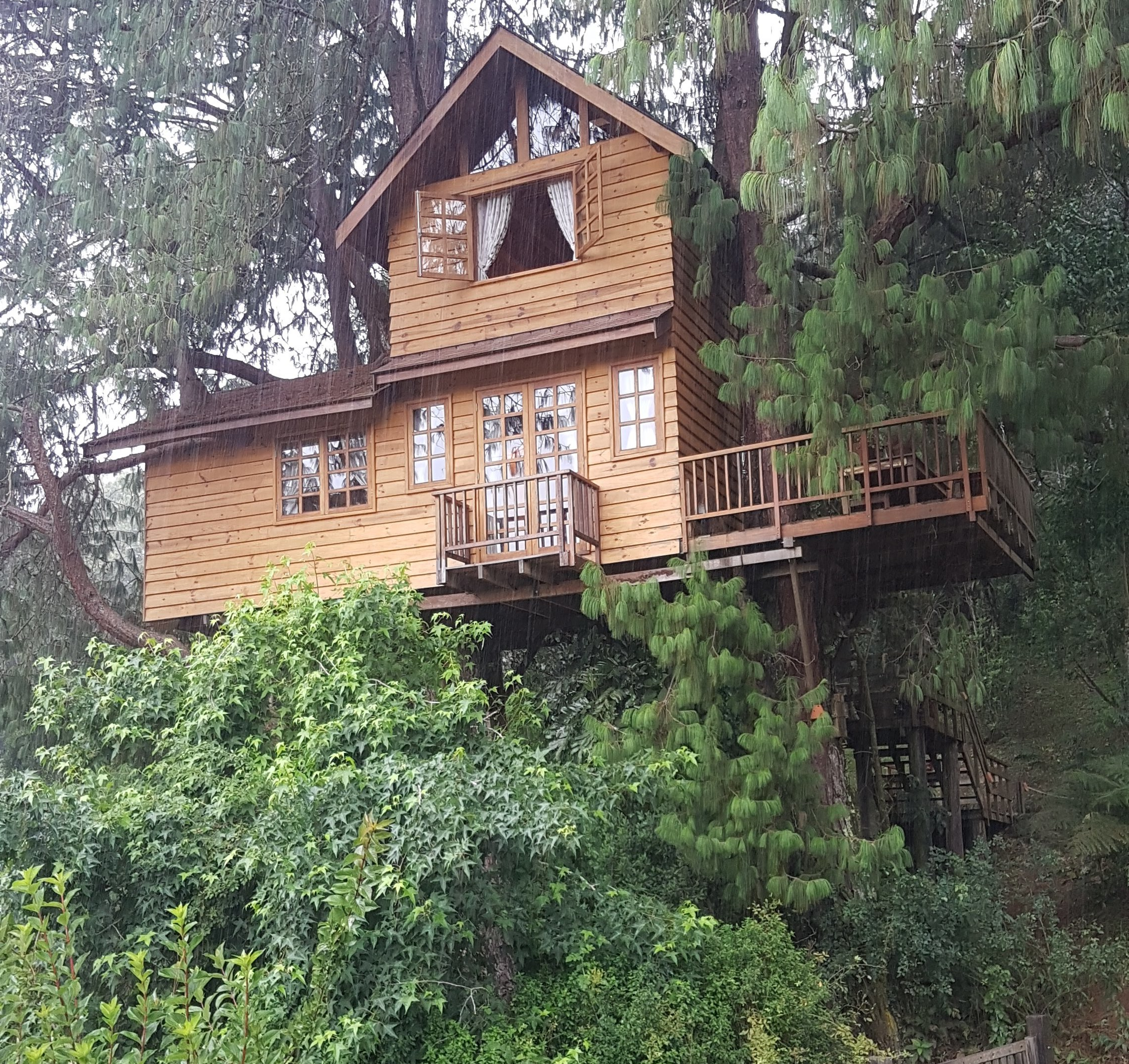

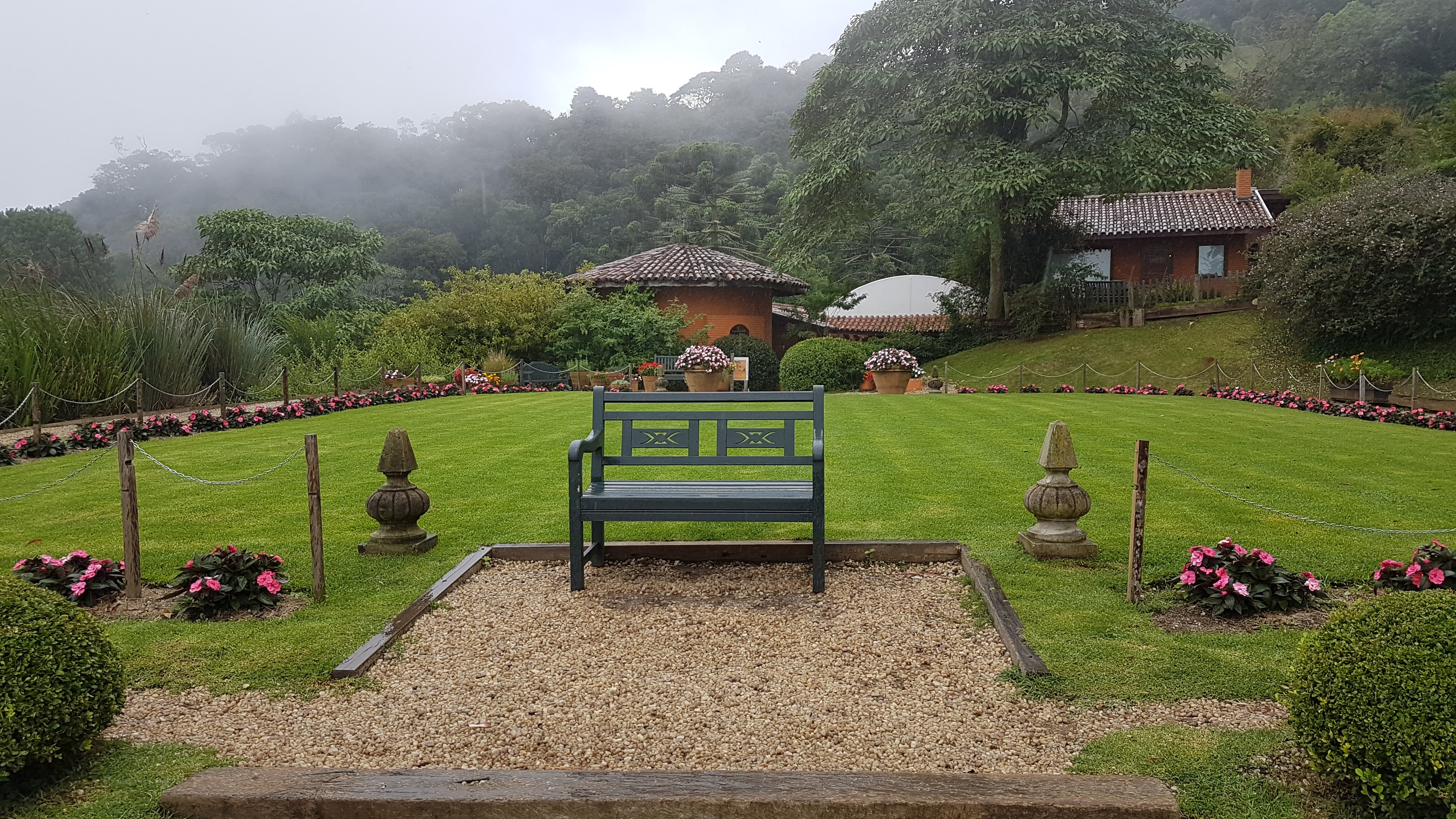

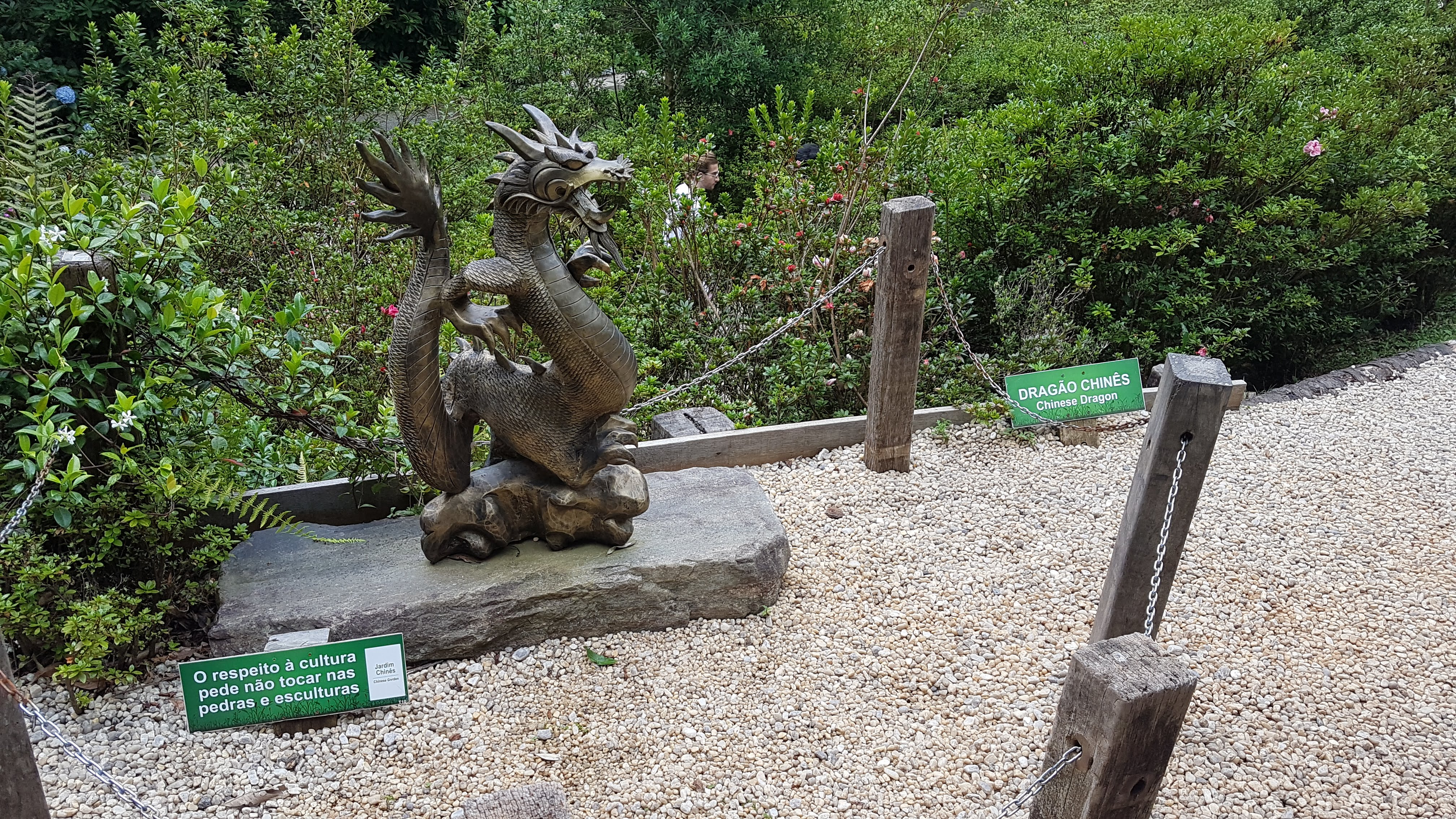

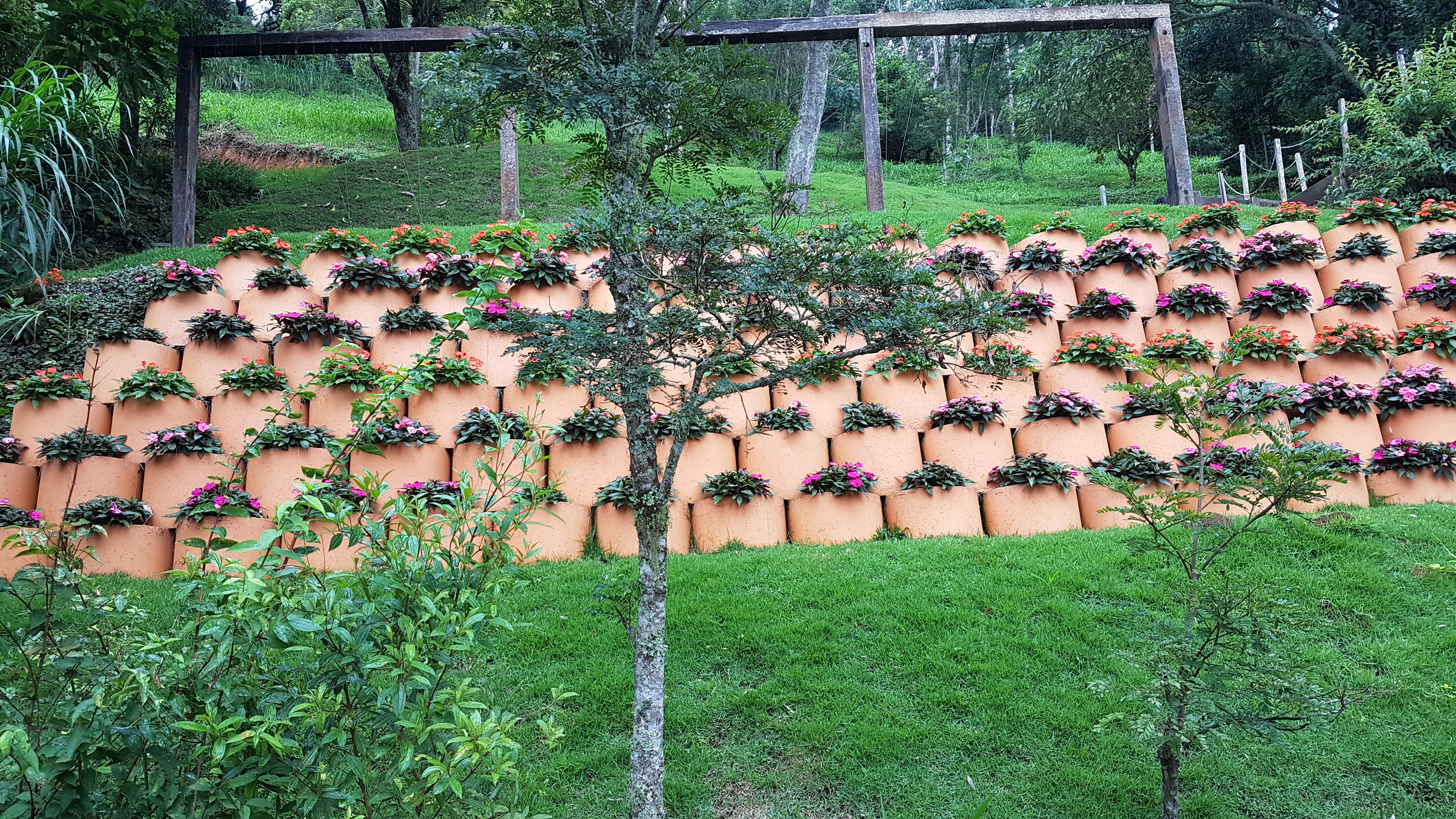

== See also ==
- Mantiqueira Mountains
- Campos do Jordão
- Atlantic Forest
- Inhotim
