= Chupa-Cu =

Fictional Brazilian creature

- Created by: TV Maresol
- Based on: Slenderman

Chupa-Cu (lit. 'Ass-Sucker'), also known as Chupa-Cu de Goianinha, is a fictional creature akin to the chupacabra and Slenderman. Created in February 2017 by Renan Ribeiro, owner of the TV Maresol profile, the character he invented quickly gained repercussion in the Brazilian internet scene.

== Origins ==
Renan Ribeiro first concocted the idea of the Chupa-Cu in February 2017. The creature is defined as a "sort of extraterrestrial being mixed with a porn actor" who attacked people in the inland village of Goianinha, Rio Grande do Norte, abusing the population in unconventional ways, by sucking the anuses of the victims. The first reference to Chupa-Cu emerged on February 17, 2017, on TV Maresol's Twitter profile. TV Maresol is a fictional television channel in Rio Grande do Norte which was created due to the rise of other satirical Twitter profiles, among them Jornal Metrópole, to which TV Maresol is affiliated to.

Renan chose Goianinha as the first thing that came from his mind, and the Chupa-Cu helped increase the number of followers on his profile; in two days, TV Maresol went from 150 followers to 1200, and other websites such as BuzzFeed Brazil started talking about the subject. The creature is also correlated with the Tupi-Guarani myth of the Kurupí, a creature with a large penis, who had a similar function to the Chupa-Cu, and the Ataíde of Bragança. A similar indigenous narrative, the diabo sem cu (Assless Devil) circulated on social media in 2016, as means of debauchery.

Fictionally, as soon as the Goianinha Chupa-Cu sightings began to viralize, reports of sightings in other parts of Brazil becan to circulate on Twitter.

On October 22, 2017, a Twitter profile impersonating UOL Notícias posted a story about a supposed sighting in Manaus, causing collective hysteria in Manaus.
