= Tau (mythology) =

Evil spirit in Guaraní mythology

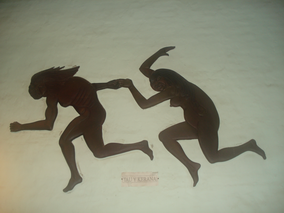
Tau pursued by Kerana.

Tau is the name of an evil spirit in South American Guaraní mythology. Although Tau is not quite synonymous with the Devil in Christian beliefs, for example, he was sometimes referred to as The Evil Spirit and as such may have been a personification of evil itself. Tau was created along with his opposite, Angatupyry, by the supreme god of the Guaraní creation myth, Tupã, and was left with humanity on Earth.

== Consort and children ==
Tau found himself enamored by a woman named Kerana, the daughter of Marangatu, who lived among the Guaraní tribe. Tau disguised himself as a handsome young man and wooed her for seven days before deciding to kidnap her, but his plot was foiled by Angatupyry, the spirit of goodness. Tau and Angatupyry fought each other for seven days and seven nights until he was at last defeated. Following his defeat, he was exiled from the land by Pytajovái, the god of war and valour.

Tau would not be so easily defeated. In spite of his expulsion he was able to return and kidnap the beautiful Kerana. It is generally assumed that he raped her while keeping her in captivity, although the tale is often told differently because the Guaraní did not have a written language, and some accounts tell of Tau and Kerana being married. Whichever the case, the product of Tau and Kerana's intercourse was seven children who were cursed by the goddess Arasy and born as monsters. Each of the seven were revered or feared, each possessing different abilities and traits, central to Guaraní lore.

The seven children were, in order of birth:

1. Teju Jagua, a half-lizard, half-dog creature considered lord of caverns
2. Mbói Tu'ĩ, a giant snake with the head of a parrot
3. Moñái, a giant horned snake said to be the lord and protector of the fields
4. Jasy Jatere, lord of the siesta
5. Kurupi, god of sexuality
6. Ao Ao, appeared as perhaps a monstrous sheep or peccary
7. Luison, a dog-like human, lord of death
