= Teju Jagua =

Legendary monster in Guarani Mythology

Teju Jagua is the first son of Tau and Kerana and one of the seven legendary monsters of Guaraní mythology.

Because of the curse placed upon Tau by Arasy for raping Kerana, Tau's descendants were forever cursed to a deformed and monstrous appearance.

Thus, the pair's first son was a huge lizard with seven dog-heads and eyes that shoot out fire. His seven dog-heads make any movement difficult. Some versions of the story say Teju Jagua has only one giant dog-head. But all versions agree that he has a limited ability to move around.

His appearance was the most horrid of all the seven brothers. However, his ferocity was tempered by choice of Tupã. He was left calm and harmless. Still he was feared for his fiery gaze.

He feeds on fruit and his brother Yasy Yateré gave him honey, his favorite food. He is considered the lord of the caves and protector of fruit. He is also mentioned as a brilliant protector of buried treasure.

Its skin became shiny after rolling around in the gold and precious stones of Itapé.
