= Moñái =

Guaraní legendary monster

Moñái is the third son of Tau and Kerana and one of the seven legendary monsters of Guarani mythology. This creature has an enormous serpent-like body with two straight, colorful horns over his head, which serve as antennae.

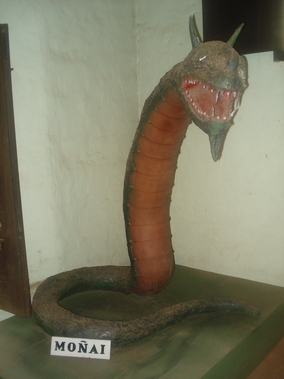
Depiction of Moñái

== Myths and functions ==
His dominions are the open fields. He can climb trees with ease and slide down to hunt the birds on whom he feeds and dominates with the hypnotic power of his antennas. Because of this he is called "the lord of the air".

Moñái is fond of stealing and hiding the products of his misdeeds in a cave. His continuous robbing and raiding in the villages provoked great discord among the people as they all accuse each other for the robberies and mysterious "disappearances" of their belongings.

The townspeople joined to put an end to Moñái's misdeeds and those of his brothers. The beautiful Porâsý offered herself to carry out this mission. She convinced Moñái that she had fallen in love with him and that before they celebrated their wedding she wanted to meet his brothers.

Moñái left her in the care of Teju Jagua and left to search for the rest of his brothers: Mbói Tu'i, Yasy Yateré, Kurupí, Luisón, and Ao Ao. When he finally brought them all they began the wedding rituals. The brothers exchanged the drinks freely and quickly became completely drunk. It was in this moment that Porâsý attempted to escape from the cave which was closed off by a huge stone.

Moñái prevented her from leaving and threw her back into the cave. Porâsý screamed to alarm the people who were waiting outside. Knowing that she was lost she ordered the people to burn the cave, even with her inside. While this killed Porasy herself, it also successfully destroyed Tau and Kerana's cursed descendants, including Moñai himself.

In return for the sacrifice of Porâsý, the gods lifted her soul and changed it into a small but intense point of light. Since then, the gods destined the spirit of Porasy to light up the aurora as the morning star.
