= Tupã (mythology) =

Thunder god of the Tupi and Guaraní people of Brazil

Tupã or Tupan (also Tupave or Tenondete) is the word for God in the Tupi and Guarani languages, including the Guarani creation myth.

Tupã is considered to be the creator of the universe, of humanity and of the spirits of good and evil in Guarani mythology referred to as Angatupyry and Tau respectively. Tupã is more specifically considered the creator of light and his residence is the Sun.

== As a post-conquest deity ==
Tupã was not actually a god, but rather a manifestation of God, in the form of thunder, according to Daniel H. Candido and Luc H. Nunes of the University of Campinas; he asserts that the Jesuit evangelizers of the period would have misinterpreted it as an actual divinity. The god in question is Nhanderuvuçu (Tupi) or Ñanderuvusu (Guarani), the Tupi-Guarani supreme deity; "Tupã" is solely used to refer to the lightning and thunder phenomenon, which has been called both a "messenger" and a "demon" at various times throughout history; the term "Nhanderuete" would be more suitable to compare to the Christian concept of God.

Tupã, according to some sources, is an adaptation of catechism, which also existed in concept for the Amerindians, but as the "sound of thunder" (tu-pá or tu-pã), an unknown (and thus feared) phenomenon. Some writers were of the opinion that "the supreme being's voice was heard in storms" as tupã-cinunga, "the thunder", whose reflection was tupãberaba, "the lightning"."

== Myths ==
=== Creation of human race ===
Before the creation of the human race, Tupã wedded the goddess Arasy, the mother of the sky whose home was the Moon. According to the myth, Tupã and Arasy descended upon the Earth one morning after their wedding, and together they created the rivers and the seas, the forests, the stars and all the living beings of the universe. It is said that the location they stood while creating these things was atop a hill in Areguá, a city in Paraguay near the capital of Asunción.

After the creation of all things in earth, Tupã set to creating the first human couple on the earth. For his creation, Tupã used a mixture of clay, juice extracted from yerba mate, blood from the Short-tailed Nighthawk, the leaves of several kinds of plants, and finally a centipede. He made a paste of this mixture, using the waters from a nearby spring that would become Lake Ypacaraí. From this paste Tupã created a pair of statues in his image, and left them in the sun to dry and filled them with life. The newly created humans were placed in front of the gods, and the woman was named Sypave (literally "mother of the people") by Arasy, and the man was named Rupave (literally "father of the people") by Tupã. Tupã and Arasy counselled the humans to live peacefully, to procreate, and to live in peace. Tupã then created the spirits of good and evil, Angatupyry and Tau, and left them to guide the people down one path or another and departed back into the heavens.

== Legacy ==
A contest was run by the Centro Paraguayo de Informaciones Astronómicas in Paraguay in 2019. This bestowed the star HD 108147 with the name Tupã in December 2019.
