= Jasy Jatere =

Figure in Guaraní mythology

Jasy Jatere is an important figure in Guaraní mythology. One of the seven cursed children of Tau and Kerana, Jasy Jatere is one of the most important gods among the Guaraní speaking cultures of South America, especially in Paraguay.

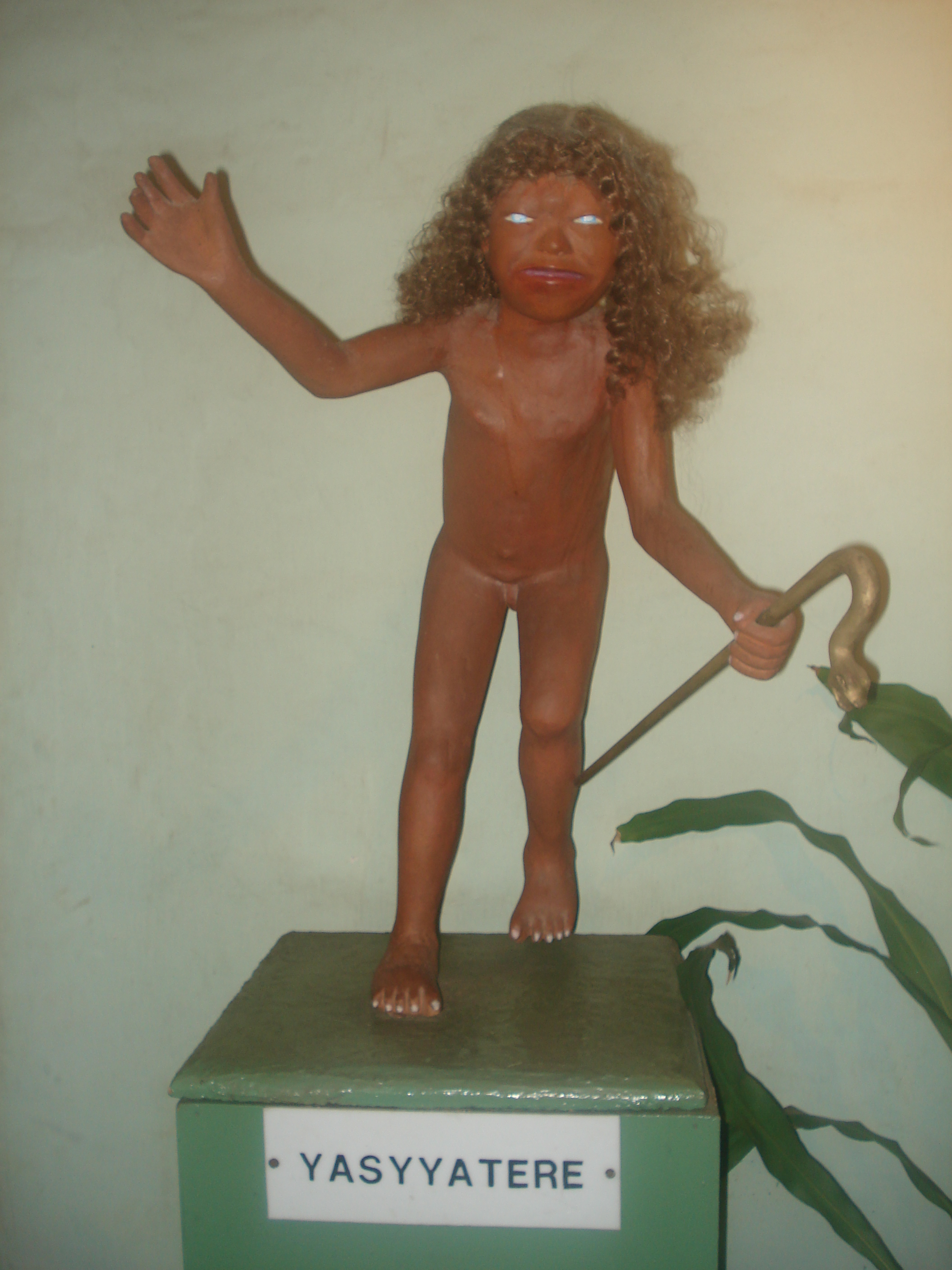
Depiction of young Jasy Jatere

== Mythology ==
=== Description ===
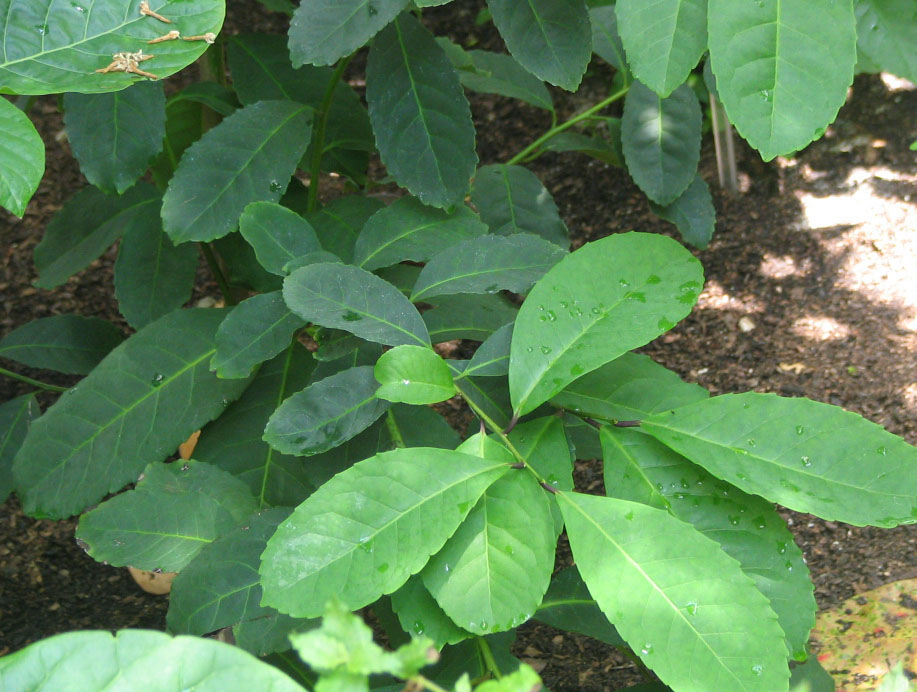
In Guaraní (Latin American) mythology, Jasy Jatere is protector of the yerba mate plant. He is also lord of the siesta.

Jasy Jatere, which means literally "a little piece of the moon", is unique among his brothers in that he does not have a monstrous appearance. He is usually described as being a small man or perhaps a child, with light blonde hair and sometimes blue eyes. He is fair in appearance, sometimes described as even beautiful or enchanting, and carries with him a magical wand or staff, sometimes described as a golden cane, although what clothing he wears, if any at all, does not seem to be an important part of the legend. Like most of his brothers he dwells in the wild, he is considered to be the protector of the yerba mate plant. Sometimes he is also viewed as a protector of hidden treasures.

=== Relations with children ===
Jasy Jatere is also considered to be the lord of the siesta, the traditional mid-day nap taken in many Latin American cultures. According to one widespread version of the myth, Jasy Jatere leaves the forest and wanders the villages looking for children who are not napping during their siesta. Although he is generally invisible, it is said that he shows himself to the children he finds not napping, and that any who look upon his staff fall into a trance. He may even lure them into the forest with a distinct whistle.

What happens to such entranced children differs depending upon which version of the story is told. Many Guaraní myths have multiple versions because there existed no written version of the language, and all myths have survived as word of mouth tales only. In the fairer version of the tale, Jasy Jatere is considered a friend of such disobedient children, taking them into hidden places in the forest to play and feeding them with honey and fruit. At the end of the siesta, when all are weary from the play, Jasy Jatere gives them a magical kiss to send them back home with no memory.

Most versions of the story are back to a cave where he puts out their eyes and imprisons them for an untold amount of time, sustaining them with wild fruits and berries until they become feral like animals. Still more gruesome tales say that the children are brought back to his brother Ao Ao, a cannibalistic creature who feeds upon their flesh. These versions of the myth are told in a similar vein to the Bogeyman, designed to frighten children into being obedient and taking a nap during their siesta. Paraguayan parents are known to warn their children not to wander off alone during siesta to prevent being kidnapped by Jasy Jatere.

It is said that Jasy Jatere's power stems from the magical staff that he carries, and if one is able to take it from him, he breaks down and cries like a little child. In this state, one may ask him for the treasures that he is protecting in return for the staff, not unlike a captured leprechaun who must reward his captor with a pot of gold.

== See also ==
- Pombero
- Kurupi
