= Luison =

Creature in Guaraní mythology

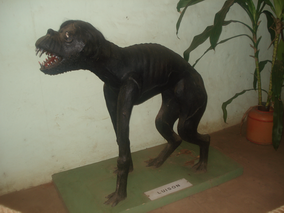
A Luison sculpture

The Luison (Paraguayan Guaraní: Luisõ; Spanish: Luisón or Lobizón) is one of the seven legendary beasts of Paraguay, and is the seventh and last son of Tau and Kerana. The myth is known also in Argentina and says that in a family with seven male children, the last child will become Luisón.

== Myth ==
In the original version of the myth, Luisón was the seventh and last child of Tau and Kerana, and thus was the most accursed. He appeared to be a giant dog, and was said to be extremely ugly, even horrendous looking.

The myth tells that the seventh son in a family will transform on his 13th birthday.

== Origin ==
The myth is widely present in roughly the same areas where the maned wolf is present. Wolves do not occur naturally in South America, but when settlers arrived they brought their myths and legends, including lycantrophy. The maned wolf, a slender, wolf-like, stilted canid that moves with shambling steps, fitted the popular depiction of the werewolf and ultimately it was syncretized with local guarani myths.

In Santiago del Estero, Argentina, a similar description is now given to the Alma mula, originally a demonic spirit shaped like a mule.

== Presidential godchild, legend and sponsorship law in Argentina ==
It has been customary since the 19th century for the President of Argentina to be named the "godparent" of each seventh male child of a married couple. This custom arose because superstitious people sometimes sacrificed their seventh son out of fear of the "possibility" that a Luisón had been born. Although this sponsorship was carried out informally until 1907, there are records that in that year the first official baptism took place with the president as godfather. On 12 March 1973, President Juan Domingo Perón gave legal form to this custom through Decree No. 848, known as the presidential sponsorship law. The decree also grants full scholarships for primary and secondary studies, while clarifying that this sponsorship "does not create any rights or benefits of any kind in favor of the godchild or their relatives".

Argentina's government and an opposition lawmaker are pushing to repeal the so-called "lobizón law" because it is seen as outdated and based on superstition, though current beneficiaries would keep their benefits.

== See also ==
- "Cry Luison"
