= Ao Ao =

South American mythological creature

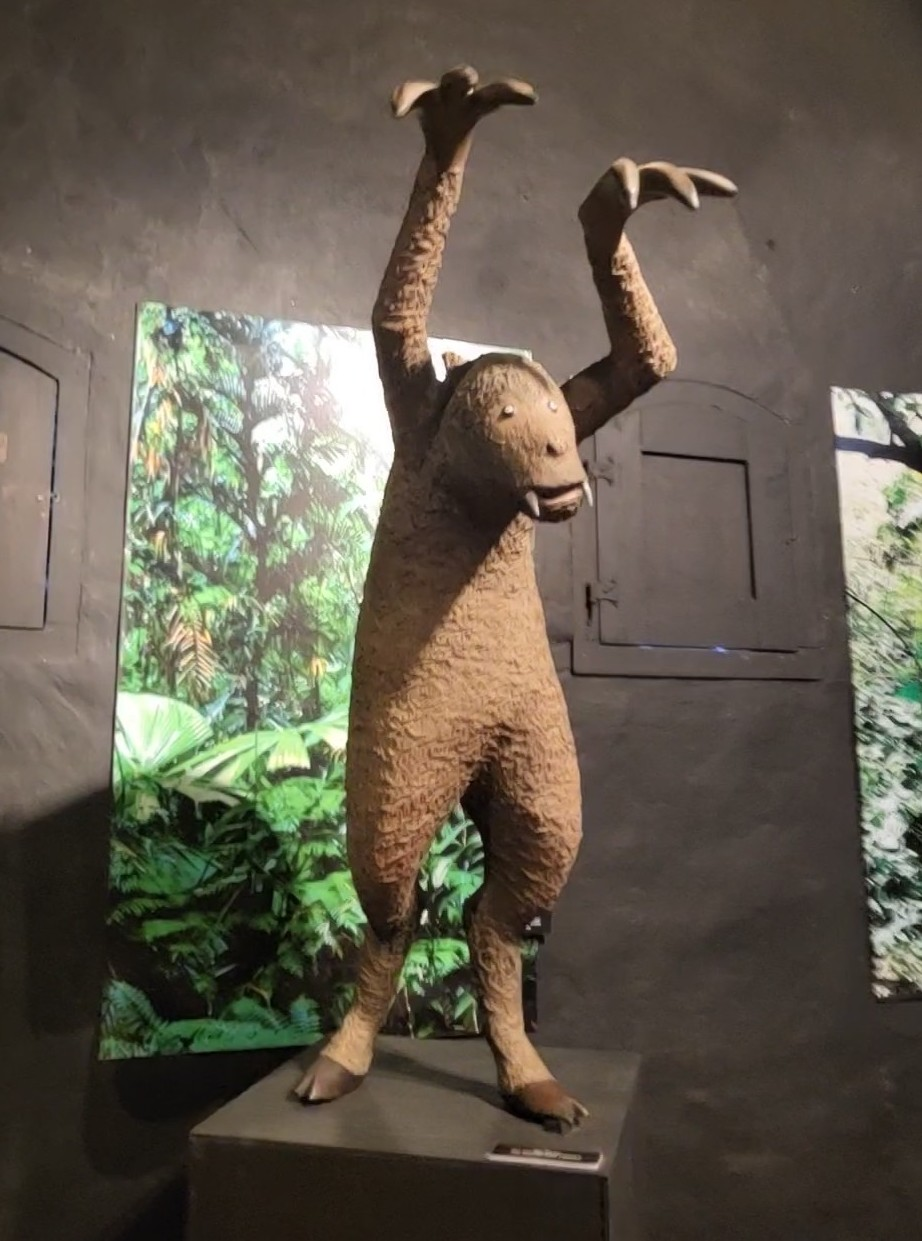
Ao Ao statue in Mythical Museum Ramón Elías

Ao Ao is the name of a monstrous creature from South American mythology. As one of the cursed sons of Tau and Kerana, it is one of the central mythological creatures among Guarani-speaking cultures. The Ao Ao is often described as being a voracious sheep-like creature with a massive set of fangs. Alternatively, it is also described as being a large, carnivorous peccary. Its name is derived from the sound that it makes, howling "Ao ao ao!" when it is pursuing its victims. The original Ao Ao is said to have profound reproductive powers and thus sometimes is identified as being the Guaraní spirit of fertility. Ao Ao produced many offspring who are cursed in the same manner, and collectively they served as lords and protectors of the hills and the mountains.

Ao Ao is said to have people as its sole source of food. Although the creature is clearly not human in description, it is at least half-human by birth, which accounts for its cannibalism. According to most versions of the myth, the Ao Ao, upon locating a victim for its next meal, will pursue the unfortunate person over any distance and over any terrain, not stopping until it has had its meal. If a person attempts to escape by climbing a tree, for example, the Ao Ao will circle the tree, howling incessantly and digging at the roots until the tree falls. In fact, according to the myth the only way to successfully escape from an Ao Ao is to seek shelter by climbing a palm tree. The tree contained some unknown power against the Ao Ao, and if its intended victim did climb one, the creature would howl in defeat and leave in search of another meal. Ao Ao is also known for eating clothes.

In some versions of the myth, the Ao Ao would feast upon disobedient children brought to it by his brother, Jasy Jatere. In Paraguay, adults scare the children by saying that Ao Ao will come after them.

== Bibliography ==
- COLMAN, Narciso R. (Rosicrán): Ñande Ypy Kuéra ("Nuestros antepasados"), 1929.
- Mauricio Cardozo Ocampo, MUNDO FOLKLORICO PARAGUAYO 2a Parte: De la tradición oral. Mitos Leyendas y Cuentos Paraguayos,1989, 215 pgs.
