= Legend of Trentren Vilu and Caicai Vilu =

Mapuche flood myth from Chile

The legend of Trentren Vilu (Trengtreng or Tenten) and Caicai Vilu (Kaikai) is a Mapuche flood myth that tells the story of a fierce battle between two mythical snakes, Trentren Vilu and Caicai Vilu. It explains how the Chilóe archipelago and mountains of southern Chile came to have its unique geography.

== Myth ==
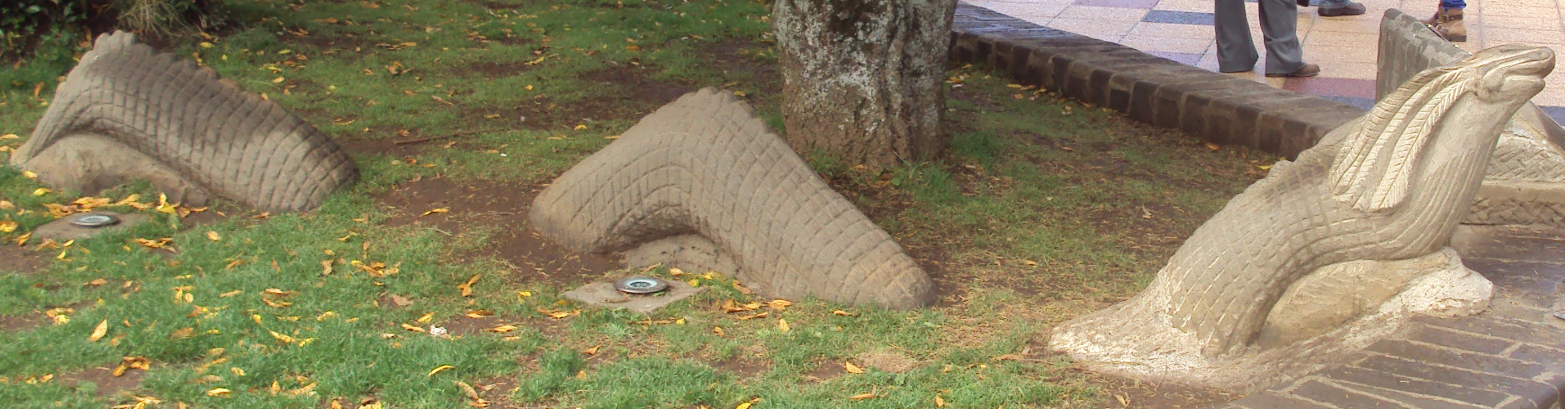
Statue of Trentren Vilu

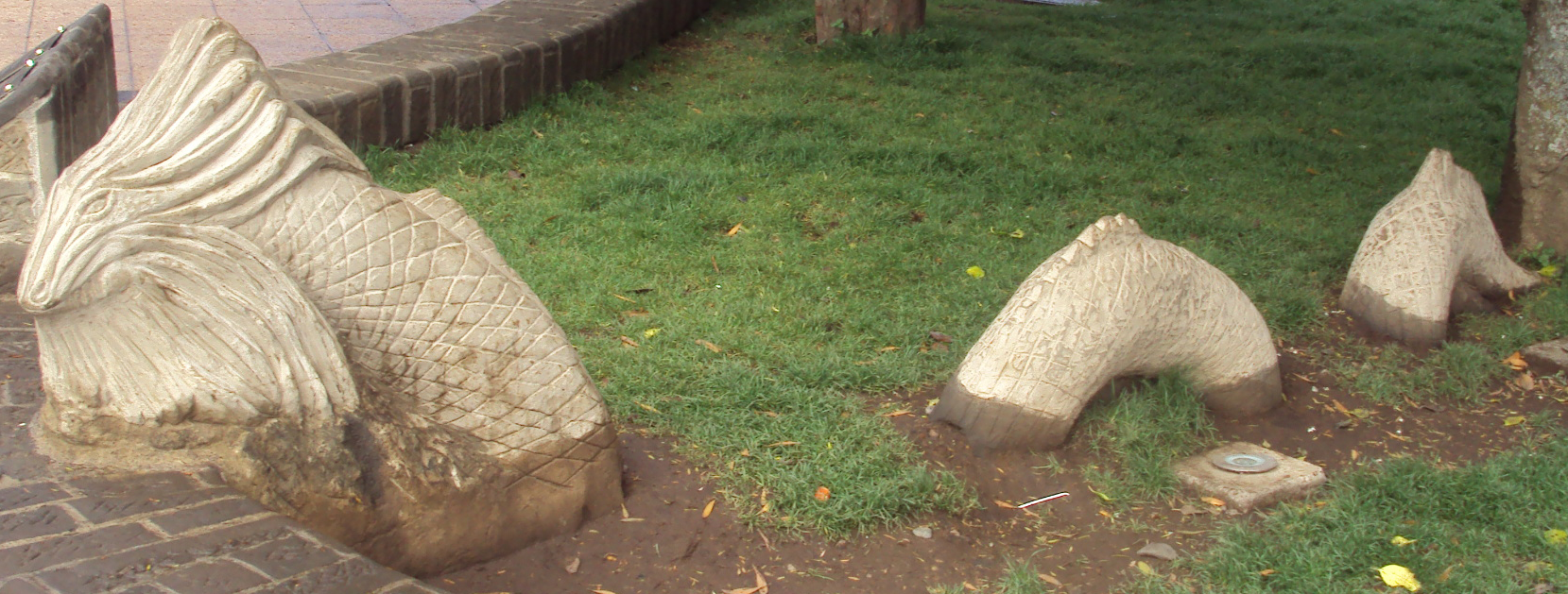
Statue of Caicai Vilu

According to the Mapuche, the two snakes were originally the children of the most powerful pillans, who were converted into their animal forms as punishment. Peripillán's son was turned into a huge snake that would be Caicai and Antu's son turned into a huge snake that would be Trentren. They were to be enemies, just as Antu and Peripillán were. Caicai was sent to live in the sea to help care for it with the Ngen-ko (water spirits), and Trentren was sent to live on earth to help care for the earth with the other Ngen, and to help humanity; thus these two snakes were used as an instrument through which the will of the ancient Mapuche spirits was fulfilled.

It is said that after Caicai awoke from his years-long slumber, he became enraged because of the ungratefulness that men showed for every gift given to them by the sea, and desired to punish humanity and to incorporate all terrestrial life to his dominions. Caicai used his fish-shaped tail to hit the water, causing a great flood, since Caicai ordered the waters to flood the valleys and hills, and to bring all its inhabitants to the bottom of the sea.

Humans invoked the help of Trentren, who saw that both humans and animals were desperate. By order of her father, she was the one who had to provide them with wisdom and protection, so she decided to help humanity. She helped the people and the animals to escape by raising them on her back and taking them to the hills; and she transformed those who were trapped by the waters into birds, so they could escape by flying; those who were drowning into fish and marine mammals (one of them being the origin of the cahuelche or talking dolphin), and those who had already drowned into sumpall (Mapuche mermen and mermaids). Those who were immobilized by the terror they felt, were transformed into mankial (petrified). But as the sea continued to rise, Trentren had to order the hills to increase in height to counteract the power of Caicai. Angry, Caicai began to fight against Trentren in a titanic battle that lasted a long time, until both snakes were tired. Caicai was partially defeated as he was not able to flood all the land; however, the waters did not return completely to their old level, giving Chile its current geography.

According to Chiloé tradition, Caicai was satisfied with the portion of land that he had managed to flood, and delegated his functions pertaining to the sea to the great Millalobo.

According to Mapuche tradition, after the cataclysm, everyone continued their quiet life; until one day it was Trentren who was angered by the attitude that men had, and made all the volcanoes erupt and the population had to move to other safer places. From that moment on, Trentren continues to manifest itself through earthquakes and volcanic eruptions, while Caicai causes tidal waves and floods when he rolls over during his sleep.

=== Variations of the myth ===
Many variations of the myth exist which can be explained through the vast area the Mapuche culture covers and the fact that many of these stories have been carried through oral tradition.

==== Central Valley variation ====
Trentren is a large mountain in a range that runs between Galvarino and Temuco. Caicai was a large snake/serpent with three arms, which were trees, the head of an ox, and a tail that was rooted in the ground. Caicai was also the chief to all the animals. High on Trentren there was a lake, which was the house of Caicai. People used to come and hit Caicai's tail with sticks. One day the people bothered Caicai too much, and Caicai led all the animals away. Caicai led them into the air, and no one knows where they went, but they are the spirit protectors of all living animals.

==== Tolten region ====
Trentren was a hall and also a good spirit which helped people. Caicai was a sea bird, an evil spirit, who used to harm people. One day Caicai decided to wipe out all the Mapuche and caused the sea to rise until the land was flooded. Many people managed to climb Trentren with their animals, and the wild animals followed. When Caicai called "cai, cai, cai" the sea rose until it nearly covered the top of Trentren and threatened everything on top. Upon seeing this, Trentren rose higher. This continued until Trentren reached its present height and all the sea water was used. Caicai was beaten and all the people and animals which climbed Trentren were safe. This is how Trentren saved the Mapuche and vanquished evil.

=== Similar myths ===
A variant of the myth tells that Caicai's anger against human beings began because a girl rejected her son, the Trauco.

Some Huilliche communities of Chiloé say that the battle originated because a daughter of the Trauco rejected the pillán Peripillán, and for this reason her son decided to take revenge.

In Argentina there are other later versions of the myth, which change the original parents of both mythical snakes, indicating that they would be brothers and/or sons of the gods Nguenechèn and Kueyen.

== In popular culture ==
In the final shot in the trailer of Nahuel and the Magic Book by Latido Films, the Caicai raise to the ocean as Nahuel hugged an unconscious friend Fresia.

== Geological and meteorological interpretations in recent studies ==
This myth has been geologically interpreted as a narrative linked to the volcanism of the Southern Volcanic Zone, emphasizing its relationship with eruptions, lahars, lake and river overflows in mountainous areas, as well as with tectonic uplifts and subsidence on the coast following major earthquakes. In Chile and Argentina, 36 place names are named after Trentren, Caicai, or variations of these names. Certain variations around Caicai also have an atmospheric component, particularly with tornadoes and waterspouts that have occurred in the central-southern region of Chile.

== See also ==
- Chilote mythology
- Deluge myth
- Mapuche mythology
