= Nguruvilu =

Mythical fox-serpent of Mapuche myth

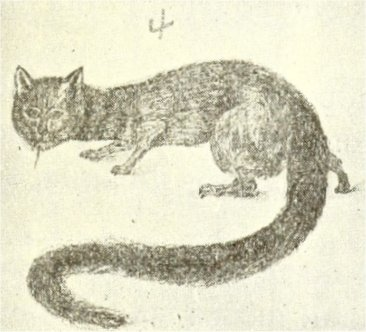
Ngúrúvilu of the Mapuche

The Nguruvilu or Guruvilu, Guirivilu, Guirivilo, etc., (from Mapudungun: ngürü, "fox" and Mapudungun: filu, "snake";) is a legendary creature originating from the Mapuche religion of the indigenous people inhabiting Chile. It is a lake- or river-dwelling creature that appears in the form with a fox-like head and snake-like body (or a cat-like head with a slender fox-like body and serpent-like tail), which snatches wading people with its (clawed) long tail, and devours or blood-sucks its victim.

== Nomenclature ==
From Mapudungun: Nguruvilu (pronunciation: with "ng" or <g̃> representing ɲ sound, "ñ" representing nʸ (Note: Lehmann-Nitsche explains the first letter ("n" in "nürüfilu") "in this Araucanian word has a dull sound, pronounced in the last region of the palate, like the "n" in the German word Dinge".)).

The etymology is given as "fox" + "serpent" (ŋərürko + filu, ngúrú + vilu, gùrù + vilu, or gurú + vilu).

Mapudungun forms also occur as: Guirivilo, Nirivilo, ñirivilo, ñirivílo, nirivílo, (Note: [Frontera] apud Lenz.) ñirivilu, guruvilo, (Note: Vidauure I, 240 apud Lenz.) ngürüvilu, gueruvilo. (Note: Lenz dictionary misprinted as "guerovilu")

Also transcribed as Nguruvilu, Guruvilu, or guirivilu. Also Ngurru vilu.

== Legend ==
The indigenous people believed the "guruvilu" to be a beast of "monstrous size" that devours people, causing the natives to avoid bathing in the lakes where the beast occurs. Some described it as fox-headed with the body of a serpent (as its name suggests), but others claimed it was like a round bloated ox hide, perhaps the "manta" (Note: Here "manta" is another name or "El Cuero" or "demon pelt" monster. See postscript.) according to Joseph de La Porte (d. 1779) as translated by Pedro Estala (1798), who commented that it can hardly be believed such creatures could exist. La Porte's report was nearly identically rehashed as the account of the "Ghyryvilu" by Juan Ignacio Molina (1810), who also believed the beast to have been the figment of their imagination.

P. S., the manta ("blanket") is (not a manta ray in the modern scientific sense) but an alias of the pelt-like monster El Cuero. (Note: Consequently DeMello's encyclopedia entry on "El Cuero", quotes the above description by Molina on the Ghyryvilu.) The Guirivilo (nguruvilu) is confused with El Cuero as well as the cuchivilu (Note: For further information, see cuero (legendary creature) § Nguruvilu.)).

However the nguruvilu (zorro culebra "fox serpent") was not so monstrously large according to an alternate account, but rather a river-dwelling beast with a cat-like head, a small and slender body, and an extremely long tail like the fox's, according to the Mapuche sourced by ethnologist Tomás Guevara (1908). It also had had a snagging claw at the tip of the tail, (Note: Guevara (1899): "Spanish: una uña agudísima en la cola".) and used the tail to ensnare humans and animals, dragging them to the river bottom, and drinking their blood. It seemed to lurk in the passes (channels) and still backwaters of the river.

Lehmann-Nitsche (1902) collected a number of anecdotes as well as sayings regarding the fox-viper (zorro-víbora) or nürüfilu from his indio informant. (Note: named Nahuelpi) While some bodies of waters are unnamed as the monster's haunt, but while fording the Limay River in Argentina, a man (Note: Named Salva.) who scoffed at his companion's fear of the monster, lost his entire pack of horses while crossing, nearly dying himself.

The informant added that the creature handled humans in water the way horses were controlled (or reined in), that when the horse died the human was spared and vice versa. Also the evil spirit wekufe (Note: Here transcribed "huekufü") was thought capable of transforming into the fox-viper. (Note: While some believe there are witches who can manifest in the form of a whirlpool ("creen que existen brujas que se revelan también en forma de remolinos)".)

Although it is not explicitly clear if the Lake Alomuní (Aluminé Lake) which the informant's (Note: Lehmann-Nitsche's source, Nahuelpi when he was 8 years-old) whole tribe had to cross from Chile into Argentina was a lake infested with the monster. Argentine historian Gregorio Álvarez makes it clear the monster of Aluminé Lake is part of the lore of Neuquén Province, where it is called Ngarrafilu, according to his informant. (Note: Ignacio Huenufil from Nahuel Mapá.) At this lake, the monster is reputed to attack the horseback rider, coiling around the legs of the horse to drag it down with the rider. It can only be dislodged by cutting it with a sharp knife, but would require a skilled swimmer (Note: Called queyelfe) to succeed. English-language books take up the legend with the lake named as one of the most dangerous waters due to the beast's presence.

Some local versions don't give a very divergent account on its appearance, and adds minutiae, such as throwing rocks at it may be met with the irritable and ferocious beast's reprisal (lore of Coinco). Or it has a body of a dog with a very long tail, and in the rare instance it leaves water, it shivers as if it were feeling cold. (lore of Coihueco de Chillán).

Later sources describe the nguruvilu with the face of a puma or wildcat and a clawed tail (Note: Morel & Moral (1987): "una terrible garra en la punta de la cola")) (Note: "with its terminal claw".) (or many claws (Note: The nguruvilu is represented as a ferret (hurón) with huge claws on its tail, according to Paleari's Andean deity dictionary.)). Folktale collector Sperata R. de Saunière (1917/1918) commented that for the Ugúruvilu, its vital source resides in the tail, and this is borne out by what happens in the tale in his anthology (Note: Title: "The Indian who gained money". The protagonist hires himself out to kill two monsters. First a cat-headed snake with a nail on its tongue attacking sheep, which the editor thinks is a lampalagua (boa constrictor), and a calf-headed fox with a long bushy tail, which Saunière is thinks is a Ngùruvilu.) where the hero cuts off the fox-monster's tail, and it dies.

Nguruvilus live in dangerous whirlpools which kill people who try to cross rivers. The creatures make the water shallow on either ford, to encourage people to try to cross it making it seem safe. However, the only safe way of crossing a river with a nguruvilu is by boat.

== Religion ==
The nguruvilu originates from the ethnic religion of the Mapuche.

Lehmann-Nitsche (1902) wrote that according to his informant Nahuelpi, it was believed that the fox-viper did no harm so long as they performed a certain form of worship. The worship ritual involved using straw to splatter chafi (wheat dough fermented in leather bag) and planting spears. There was an instance when they slaughtered a small white bull and offered the pieces for the creature to appease it. It was taboo to call it by name, and the circumlocution "lord of the water" was used. (Note: Spanish: dueño del agua.)

(For a layman), the only way to get rid of a nguruvilu is through the offices of a machi (shaman) or good kalku "sorcerer". The kalku is to be offered gifts in return for the service of Nguruvilu removal. The kalku (who may be male or female) wades through the river until they reach the whirlpool and then dives in. Afterwards, they swim to the surface having captured the Nguruvilu in their arms with their powerful magical abilities. They then proceeds to threaten the creature with a long, sharp knife, saying they will mutilate it if it ever harms another person trying to cross the waterway. The Kalku then releases the nguruvilu back into the water.

It is important that this act is witnessed by everyone from the area. Then usually a great celebration is held and no one must fear crossing the waterway ever again. The whirlpool or whirlpools shrink and then disappear, and the fords become even shallower, making the crossing safe enough even for the frailest old woman or youngest child. It is believed the creature moves its business elsewhere, probably to torment the peoples downstream at the next popular river crossing.

== Fauna identifications ==
Anthropologist Robert Lehmann-Nitsche was of the opinion that the myth of this creature originated from observations of the otter, more particularly Lutra felina G. I. Molina, i.e. marine otter (syn. Lontra felina).

== Parallels ==
Antonio Paleari's dictionary of Andean deity compares the "nguruvilu" to the Matlicue (Chalchiuhtlicue), the Aztec water deity causing floods and tempests and held to be the protector of children, with the distinction that the nguruvilu dwells strictly in inland waters (freshwater (Note: "Ghyryvilu" discussed under "XII. pesces de agua dulce" by Molina (1987) [1810])).

== See also ==
- Coi Coi-Vilu
- Underwater panther
- Ahuitzotl
