= Cuero (legendary creature) =

Creature from Mapuche mythology

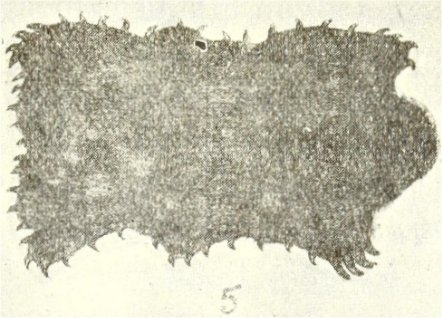
Trelquehuecufe ("cuero-wekufe or "pelt of the evil spirt") of the Mapuche, a monster with claws around its rim.

El cuero (from Mapudungun: trülke wekufü "pelt or hide" and "wekufe or evil spirit") also known as cuero del agua ("water hide"), cuero vivo ("live hide"), manta (El Manta, "The Blanket") or manta del diablo is an aquatic creature from Mapuche mythology subsequently incorporated into the myth of Central Chile (including Chiloé Islands) and Southern Chile, and certain parts of southwest Argentina.

== Nomenclature ==
Mapudungun orthography: trülke wefukü "devilish pelt", (Note: Spanish: cuero diabolo.) also transcribed trəlke "hide or pelt" + wekufü.

Transliterated as Trelquehuecuve, Trelquehuecufe (with the footnote that the "v" in the north tends to be pronounced as "f" by the southern population) or Trelquehuecuvu, Trelquehuecú, telquehuécuve or chueiquehuecú, chueiquebueicú. (Note: Lenz, "Chueiquehuecú" apud Vicuña.)

Alias Laquen trilque, lufquen-trilque (cuero del lago "pelt of the lake" <Mapudungun: lafken "lake").

This also called cuero del agua or cuero de agua. or colloquially cuero vivo ("live hide").

It is also called manta (La Manta, "the Blanket") or "manta del Diablo". Also Cuero del agua "water hide".

== General description ==
El Cuero dwells in the depths of rivers and lagoons. Most sources agree in describing El Cuero as resembling an outstretched cowhide (or calfskin, or donkey hide come to life (Note: Lore of Concepción.)) which envelops its prey, and many sources call it an octopus (Spanish: pulpo), or cuttlefish (Spanish: jibia).

From Mapuche sources, Guevera earlier stated the Trelquehuecuve (northern pronunciation) was an octopus with "nails at the end of its arms", (Note: Spanish: brazos terminan en uñas) (Note: Guevara Historia I: 230 apud Vicuña; (=Guevara (1899) Ch. VIII) but in a later work, he said the Trelquehuecufe (southern pronunciation) was "armed with claws all around", (Note: Spanish: armada de garras en todo su alrededor) and included a drawing of a pelt with many claws all around the edges.

Details differ, and a different source described the cuero as an octopus with innumerable eyes on the rim, with four large eyes in the middle (lore of Talagante). Some informants told a story collector that the hide was brown "with large whitish spots", and had many short legs ending in a claw to grab the victim.

Or tentacles terminating in pincers and a pair of eyes, with a suction cup in the center, according to Bernardo Quintana Mansilla (1972). Red, bulging eyes at the center, and a feeding mouth underneath, according to another book (2023).

=== Manta ===
El Cuero is also known as the La Manta ("blanket"), assumed to be an octopus also, with an expansive skin that folds back to catch its prey.

"Manta" is the preferred term in the Chiloé Islands where it would be called "Cuero" elsewhere in Chile, according to Cavada. The Manta targets humans and animals entering water, wraps around, and drags its prey to the bottom of the water.

As for connection to manta ray cf. § Fauna identification.

=== Guirivilo ===
El Cuero is sometimes confused with the Guirivilo (nguruvilu), the "fox-serpent".

Father Joseph de La Porte (d. 1779)'s report of the "guruvilu" was closely reiterated by Father Juan Ignacio Molina (1810)'s on "Ghyryvilu", with both saying that the term was also applied sometimes to an ox-hide like creature they reckoned to be the "Manta". Molina's description is filed under the entry for "Cuero" in DeMello' encyclopedia (2024).

Julio Vicuña Cifuentes had filed Vicuña Mackenna's description of the "cuero" (cf. § Local legends) under his "Guirivilo" material.

The monster dubbed gueruvilo by the locals of the town of Talcamávida on the northern bank of the Biobío River, had been blamed for taking children who bathed in the lagoon about 400 yards in circumference beyond the town's moat. Vicente Carvallo y Goyeneche (d. 1816) reported the beast as the Manta, in his posthumously published work.

== Legend ==
The creature lurks in the rivers, lagoons, and lakes of Chile and Argentina. The legend of the cuero or "manta" extends to the whole of Chile, including the Chiloé Archipelago.

=== Mapuche lore ===
The "Trelquehuecufe", presumed to be a clawed octopus uses its ability to contract and squeezed the life out of its victim.

The "Trelquehuecuve" evidently engages in sunbathing on the beach: it crawls out to the edge of a river or lagoon to receive the warmth of sunlight, and when it wishes to return, it raises a whirwind or whirpool (Note: Spanish: remolino.) which will shove it back into water.

=== Local legends ===
A cuero appeared in the lagoon of Viña del Mar which enveloped its unwary prey like a "sheet", (Note: Spanish: sábana) as reported by Benjamín Vicuña Mackenna (1877). The writerremarked it must be the case of the giant octopus from Victor Hugo. (Note: Vicuña Mackenna (1877) De Valparaíso a Santiago, p. 76 apud Vicuña.)

In the Lácar region of Neuquén Province, where they perform the Mapuche rite of the ngillatun, (Note: At a place named "Pampa de Oro" (milla lelfün); Hassler attended the ceremony 1953.) The researcher gathered detailed information on the "lafquen-trilque" ("pelt of the lake") which reputedly assumes a straight-log like form, like a thick, long trunk (tronco), but is able unfurl (expand) and flatten out (Lácar Lake). It has a generally earthen color but is sometimes green or black. The waves wash sand over it and it becomes camouflaged. When one steps on it, there is a mossy feel, but then experiences dizziness (or drowsiness), and the pelt monster flips up its sides equipped with numerous sharp nails and claws, and envelops the victim, carrying him to the depths. (Note: From informant Lucas Lefiñir, interviewed by researcher Hassler. Requoted by Álvarez) (Note: Nearly identically worded but abridged account from informant Quintomán at Lácar Lake, given by Leonardo at Lácar Lake.)

There is a local legend of the cuero appearing at Tranque Lautaro or Lautaro Reservoir, Atacama Region.

== Protection ==
The traditional capturing method use a sort of natural fishing lure using a "thorny bush" known in Chile as quisco, which usually refers to the cactus Echinopsis chiloensis (lore of Buin and Coihueco de Chillán conurbation).

But to defeat a cuero, the help of a machi wise woman may be required. The machi will use a method similar to the one already described, plunging the thorny bush of the calafate (Berberis microphylla, Magellan barberry) and the cuero will pounce on it mistaking it for food prey, is damaged by the thorns as it squeezes, and it dies.

In one retold story, a family was camping at a lake in southern Chile, and the father was hypnotized by a strange bubbling and jumped in, then the bubble grew into a whirlpool and out came a Trelke-wekufe (tr. The Cowhide) which grabbed the man away. She created a lure out of the spiny cuttings of the quizco (quisco' cactus) and the calafate wrapped up to resemble a human, and made some incantations in Mapudungun. The monster attacked and got snagged by the spines, and mortally wounded the creature.

== Popular tales ==
In the story "The indio and the cuero", the hero Ñanco defeats the cuero by fighting it with bunches of quisco cacti tied to his arms and legs, and the monster bled out to death. He enters a secret cave, and stabs the monster's master, fat, with one leg stuck to his back, and the face turned away (identifiable as an Invunche) and rescues his cousin, daughter of the cacique chieftain. Other girls had been kidnapped by the cuero, and brought to be forcibly married to the Invunche, or have their blood sucked. Ñanco finds silver treasure, and with the wealth, successfully marries the cousin, over the rich one-eyed rival. (Note: Narrated by Ramón Trincau, from Río Bueno.)

The story entitled "The Lagoon of Pudahuel" referring to a sector of Santiago tells of a time when the railroad had not been connected from Valparaíso to the capital, when one ox-carter decided he would ford across on a Good Friday, against the apprehensions his colleagues, and got taken down by a cuero before their eyes. (Note: The informant, Ramon Fernandez, 15 year-old student, explains furthermore in a footnote signed "R.F." that the cuero attacks people, animals and small Watercraft vessels, and sandwiches the victim between the folds of skin it develops by movement.)

== Fauna identification ==
One lexicographer (1916) opined that the Cuero del agua "water hide", a supposed freshwater species of octopus that attacks humans must be a fabulous invention based on a marine species.

Some have suggested the myth of "La Manta" may be connected to the manta ray or some other large ray.

=== Scientific explanation ===
The myth may have originated from the phenomenon of the remolino (whirpool, whirlwind).

== Sightings ==
In 2026 a report of a sighting with video was published.

== See also ==
- nguruvilu – Mythical fox-serpent of Mapuche myth
- Wekufe – Spirit or demon in Mapuche mythology
- Monster of Lake Tota – Colombian mythological creature
- Nahuelito – Alleged cryptid in Argentina
- Ubrique
- Caboclo de agua
