= Fire-breathing monster =

Type of monster in mythology and fantasy

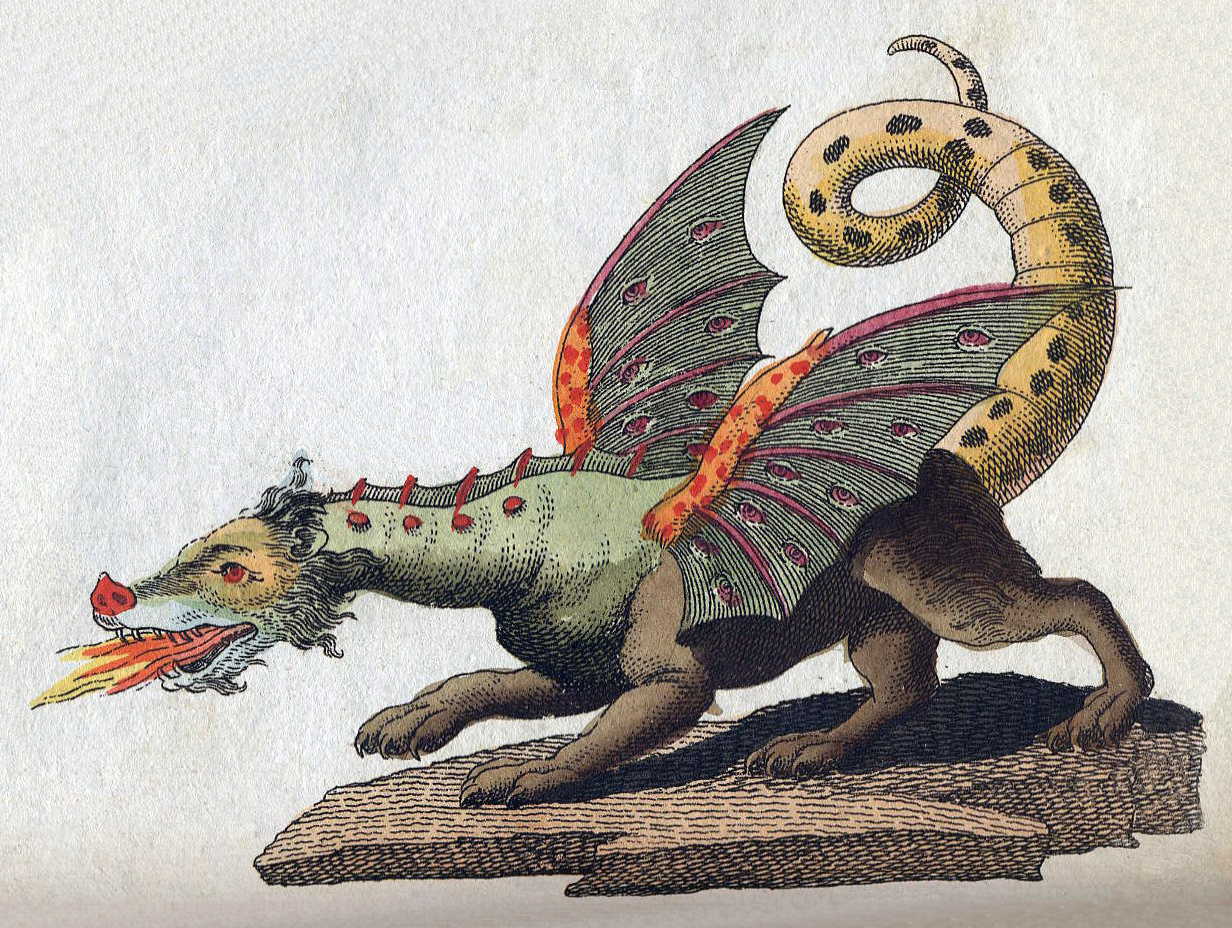
A mythical fire-breathing dragon depicted by Friedrich Justin Bertuch (1806)

In mythology and fantasy, a fire-breathing monster is a monster with the ability to shoot fire from its mouth. The concept of a fire-breathing monster is shared by various mythological traditions throughout history, and is also a common element of monsters in the fantasy genre, especially dragons, which are almost always given the ability to shoot fire, or some other type of breath-based attack. The origins of this power may vary, from magic to a biological explanation similar to an organic flamethrower.

== Religious and mythological origins ==
One of the first monsters described as fire-breathing was the Chimera of Greco-Roman mythology, although these types of monsters were comparatively rare in such mythology, with limited other examples including the Khalkotauroi, the brazen-hooved bulls conquered by Jason in Colchis, which breathed fire from their nostrils, and the cannibalistic Mares of Diomedes, owned by Diomedes of Thrace, which were conquered by Heracles. In addition, the giant Enceladus was fire-breathing, with the eruptions of Mount Etna being attributed to his breath after the island of Sicily was thrown on top of him by Athena, goddess of wisdom.

Cacus was described by the Romans as a monstrous, giant fire-breathing son of Vulcan, who resided in a cave beneath the Palatine Hill prior to the founding of Rome, and was killed by Hercules after a tremendous battle in which the hero was attacked by the creature's fire breath.

In Jewish mythology, the sea serpent Leviathan, a predecessor to the concept of the dragon, is described as having the power to breathe fire. It is stated in Job 41:19–21 that "its breath kindles coals, and a flame comes out of its mouth". Chapter 11, Verse 18 of the deuterocanonical Book of Wisdom describes how God had the power to create fire-breathing beasts plague the Egyptians that could scare humans to death simply by seeing them, but chose not to do so because that amount of power was unnecessary.

In the Anglo-Saxon epic poem Beowulf, the dragon was the first fictional appearance of a fire-breathing European dragon in its typical form, having been inspired by the evil Biblical Leviathan. The Beowulf dragon in turn directly influenced fantasy writer J. R. R. Tolkien, a Beowulf scholar, who went on to incorporate a fire-breathing dragon in The Hobbit in the form of Smaug.

In Japanese mythology, the Yōkai sea serpent Ikuchi is known for breathing fire through its nostrils, emitting smoke. Another creature from Japanese mythology called Basan is described as a bird which breathes a brightly hued cold ghost-fire.

In Philippine mythology, the sea serpent Bakunawa, known in Visayan folklore as the moon eater, is described as kindling coal and emitting flames from its mouth at night.

In Native American mythology, the sea serpent Gaasyendietha is said to kindle coal and emit flames from its mouth, resembling a sea dragon.

A winged monster believed to have a body like that of a crocodile or snake and spit fire called Ninki Nanka appears in West African folklore.

In Mapuche religion, the Ten Ten-Vilu is a giant snake god of the earth, fire, and volcanoes.

== In fantasy ==
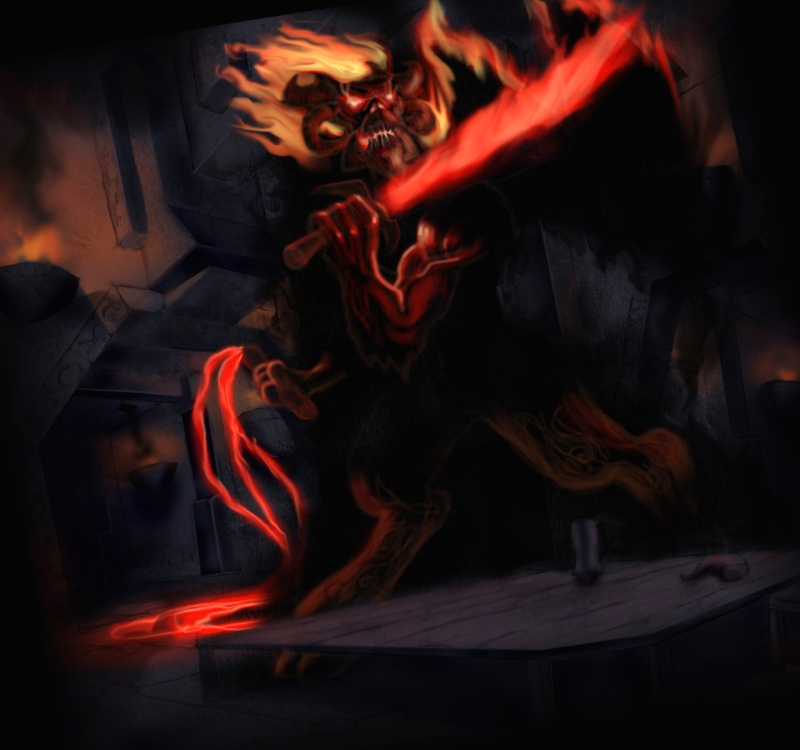
The Balrog in The Lord of the Rings and associated works is depicted as a demon with the ability to breathe fire.

The Hobbit and The Lord of the Rings, seminal works of fantasy fiction by J. R. R. Tolkien, prominently included powerful fire-breathing monsters, such as Smaug the dragon and the Balrog. Notably, Smaug drove the dwarves out of Erebor primarily with his fire breath and resided within the mountain for the ensuing 150 years. The demonic Balrog also uses its "flames and fireballs" to defeat Gandalf, a protagonist and powerful wizard.

Fire-breathing dragons in fantasy fiction have become a stereotype, therefore, numerous dragons with alternate means of attack have been depicted. This includes various forms of elemental breath, noxious poison, and even laser beams.
