= Ngen =

Nature spirits in Mapuche mythology

In Mapuche mythology, Ngen or " Ngen-ko " are spirits of nature of the Mapuche beliefs. In Mapudungun, the word ngen means "owner".

== Legend ==
The Ngen are those that manage, govern and arrange the different features of nature; but also those that nature takes care of and protects. The Ngen were created by the Pu-am (the representation of the universal soul), who wanted the Ngen to assure the order and the laws of admapu (rules of the Mapuche tradition); and they prevent commotion such as the one caused by the battle of the pillan before the beginning of time. The Ngen receive orders of the Pu-am and of Antü (the most powerful pillan spirit).

If a Mapuche needs to obtain something from nature, they must respect and give an offering to the specific Ngen spirit.

The Ngen take on forms that are based on humans, animals, and plants. Each type of Ngen spirit receives a specific name.

- Ngenechen (Ngen-che): spirit or deity who governs human beings
- Ngen-mapu: owners of the Earth
- Ngen-wingkul: owners of the hills or volcanos
- Ngen-kütral: owner of the fire
- Ngen-ko: owners of the water
- Ngen-kürüf: owners of the winds
- Ngen-mawida: owners of the forest
- Ngen-kulliñ: owners of the animals
- Ngen-lawen: owner of the medicinal herbs
- Ngen-kura: owners of the stones
- Ngen-rüpü: owners of the paths created by nature or the footsteps of wild animals
