= Ten Ten-Vilu =

Mapuche god of Earth and Fertility

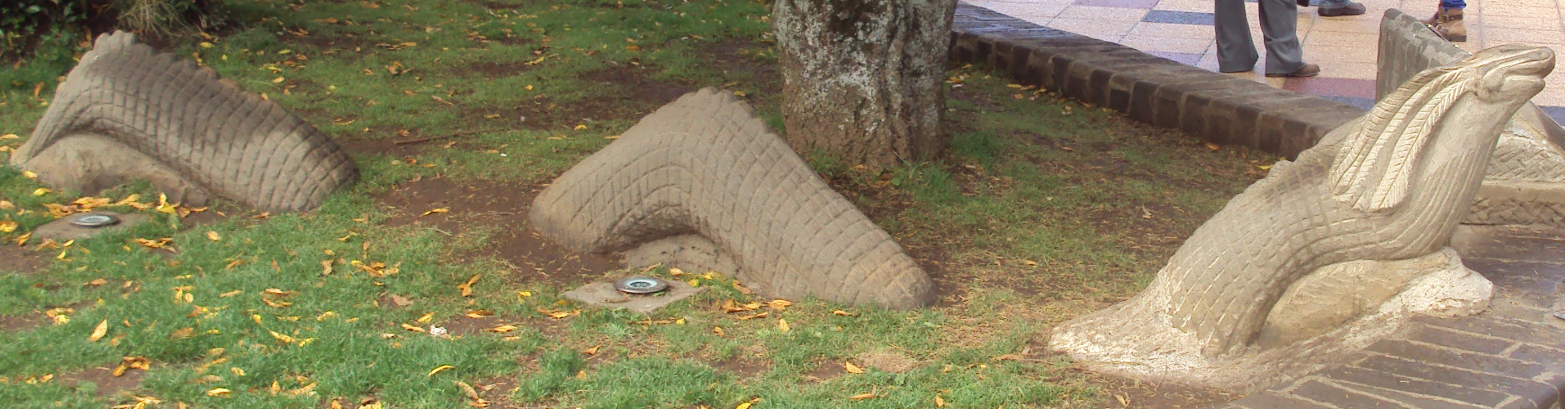
Statue of Ten Ten-Vilu at Plaza de Armas, Ancud, Chile

Ten Ten-Vilu or Trentren-Vilu (from Mapudungun: Trengtrengfilu; Trengtreng, a name, and filu, "snake") is the Mapuche god of earth and fertility (or goddess in some versions found in Chiloé); he has a generous spirit and is the protector of all life on Earth, and the flora and fauna and according to some Mapuche myths (later also found in Chiloé). This snake was a central figure in the origin of the Chiloean Archipelago. In Mapuche mythology, Ten Ten-Vilu is son of Antü (a Pillan spirit).

== Origin ==
The legend tells that the son, or daughter (in other versions), of the spirit Pillan Antu wanted the power of his father. As punishment, his father transformed him into a serpent, which would become the divinity of all that is the earth.

Ten Ten-Vilu, along with Kai Kai-Vilu, were the children of powerful spirits Antu and Pien-Pillan (Antu, father of Ten-Ten, and Pien-Pillan, father of Kai Kai), but they were ambitious and desired the power of their parents. They tried to obtain their power, and in punishment their parents transformed them into serpents. Kai Kai-Vilu became "the serpent god(dess) of the sea" and Ten Ten-Vilu "the serpent god(dess) of the earth".

=== Fight against Kai Kai-Vilu ===
When humans did not show gratitude for what the spirits gave them, Kai Kai-Vilu and evil spirits attempted to eliminate them by raising the waters to drown and assassinate them, but Ten Ten-Vilu raised the earth and began a titanic war, creating (in effect of the elevation of the sea and the mountains) the archipelago of Chiloe. That is why now when Kai Kai-Vilu raises the water, Ten Ten-Vilu moves the ground (this last narrative explains why earthquakes and tsunamis occur).

== See also ==
- Chilota mythology
- Mapuche mythology
