= Antu (Mapuche mythology) =

Antu is the name given to the principal Pillan spirit in Mapuche mythology. Antü is the most powerful Pillán, who governs the other Pillans. In Mapuche mythology, Antu represents the Sun, as well as light, wisdom and spirit, and is opposite to darkness and the physical world, and is married to Kueyen, a Wangulén spirit that represents the moon.

== Battle of the Pillan ==
It is said that when Antu decided to take a Wangulén (of Mapudungun wangülen, "star") as wife, all of them wanted to be picked as Antu was the brightest of the Pillan, but when he picked Kueyen, as she was the most luminious, great unrest started between the Wangulén. Peripillán, the red spirit of fire, was behind this, as he, Antu's rival, felt envy at Antu, as Antu's gold was undarkened by the flame, while Antu himself resented Peripillán as the fire was brighter than the gold amidst the darkness, as peace had ceased, the two Pillán fought in battle, and the spirits took sides in battle, many Pillán and all the Wangulén supporting Peripillán.

The battle was long and violent, the land moved, as well as the Minche Mapu (in Mapudungun, "underworld") and the Ankawenu. As the fight extended, the sons of the elder spirits had grown, and in desire to take their parents's place, fought against them. Both Antu and Peripillan, angered by this, grabbed their giant sons by their long hair and threw them down, they fell on the rocky ground, one landing in the Puelmapu and the other in the Lafkenmapu. As they fell their hard bodies marked the land, forming tall mountains as they were broken into pieces and sunk into the depths of the land.

Finally after the battle Antu had topped Peripillán and came out as the victor, blinded in rage and seeking revenge, he threw the defeated Pillán to the land and sunk them to its depths, then he put rocks, hills and mountains over he buried Pillán, forming more mountain ranges and Peripillán, the most powerful one, was buried with the tallest mountains covering him. This wasn't enough to put off his fire's light though, and as Peripillán and his allies try to free themselves the land itself shakes and tremors happen. Sometimes their fire is able to briefly escape their mountain prisons, as the smoke and fire columns coming off volcanos.

Meanwhile, the Wangulén fearing retribution cried as they pleaded for mercy, and their tears fell between and on top of the newly risen mountains, forming lakes and freezing into snow in the mountain tops. Seeing this, Antu decided to be merciful and only weakened their light so it was slight and pale so none of them could rival Kueyen.

Between the body of the fallen were the sons of Antu and Peripillán, and their respective wives cried in sorrow at their lose, so Antu felt for them and decided to bring them back to life, but in new forms, as giant snakes. Peripillán's son was to be known as Coi Coi-Vilu, while Antu's own son was to be known as Ten Ten-Vilu, and these were to be rivals as their fathers, and to do as the elder spirits willed. As a result of the fight, the earth moved so strongly, that the imprisoned malignant Wekufe spirits were freed from it and began roaming the land. And the universe was left with no harmony.

== See also ==
- Ngenechen
