= Anchimayen =

Creature in Mapuche mythology

The Anchimayen (in the Mapudungun language, also spelled "Anchimallén" or "Anchimalguén" in Spanish) is a mythical creature in Mapuche mythology. Anchimayens are described as little creatures that take the form of small children, and can transform into flying fireballs that emit bright light. They are the servants of a kalku (a type of Mapuche sorcerer).

According to some sources, the goddess (Note: Given as "Anchimalhuen") was originally conceived of as the moon goddess, married to the sun, but later developed into a fuego fatuo (will-o'-the-wisp) type being that frightens and unhorses travelers.

Anchimayens are sometimes confused with Kueyen (the Mapuche lunar goddess), because she also produces a bright light.

== See also ==
- Ball lightning
- Energy being
- Tupilaq
- Tikoloshe
- Atmospheric ghost lights
- Will-o-the-wisp
