= Koromodako =

Japanese mythological creature

The koromodako (ころもだこ/衣蛸; "clothing octopus") is a yōkai in the Japanese folklore.

Although in the guise of a small octopus, it is said to expand and envelop boats and people.

The lore is localized in northern Kyoto Prefecture, vaguely described as promontory areas (jutting into Wakasa Bay), though also pinpointed to a village (Sodeshi) at the northern tip of Tango Peninsula.

== Mythology ==
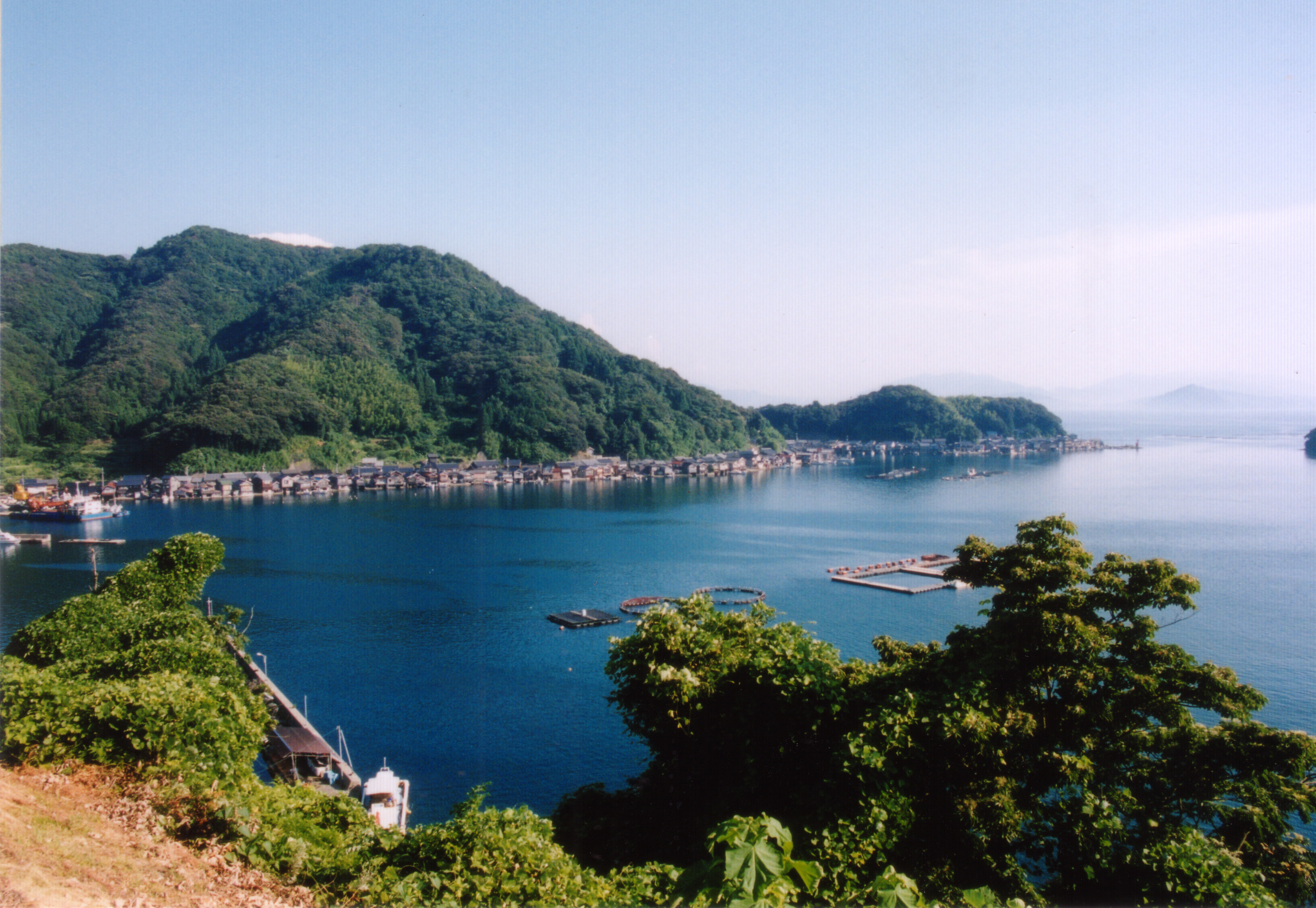
Seascape of Yosa District, Kyoto (here Ine Bay) (Note: Ine is not specified by any source, and book sources vaguely list "promontory areas of Yosa District". Given that the current district contains widely separated towns of Yosano, Kyoto (nearly landlocked, hardly with anyreal promontory) and Ine, the candidates are reduced to spots in the latter, e.g. Ise Promontory, Washi Promontory. However the former Yose District during the Meiji Era included the bulk of the city of Miyazu, and if this is loosely meant, it would expand the number of candidates to include, e.g. Tai Fishing Port.)

As the name indicates, koromo-dako is an octopus-like yōkai that appear small at first, but expands widely like a piece of clothing when a boat arrives, and sinks both vessel and humans in the sea. (Note: Miyagi-ken shi 宮城県史 [History of Miyagi Prefecture (1973 edition), citing Sōgo nihon minzoku goi 綜合日本民俗語彙 [Comprehensive Japanese folklore vocabulary] . Cf. 1957 edition.) (Note: Sōgo nihon minzoku goi (Noroko Nagata 永田典子) cited by Nihon no shinbutsu no jiten dictionary, s.v. "Koromodako".)

The small octopus can expand to the area of 6 tatami mats, 12 x 12 Japanese feet square, or 142.3 square feet (13.2 m^{2}). (Note: In Japan, the tatami mat unit of area is called jō, so 6 jō area. Each tatami measures 6x3 shaku which is 11.93 inches, nearly 1 foot.) Some of them are found concealed inside a shell.

One source (Tokihiko Ōtō 1949) identifies the locality of the lore as Sodeshi village, which is on the northern tip of Tango Peninsula (aka Yosa Peninsula). The localization is given more vaguely as some promontory area in Yosa District, Kyoto., and the yōkai is also described as appearing in Wakasa Bay. (Note: Wakasa Bay is also claimed by Fukui Prefecture, but there is no basis to assume the lore is spread as far east as that.)

An actual marine animal compared to this yōkai is the Common blanket octopus (Japanese name: murasaki-dako, lit. 'purple octopus') that inhabits the Sea of Japan. It has membranes between the tentacles when outspread can expand its area 10-fold, though the octopus is quite small. This octopus is in fact called koromo-dako (衣ダコ) locally in some areas of Japan such as Takeno, Hyōgo.。

== Analogue ==
A similar creature described in a collection of sea yōkai is the Futon kabuse (フトンカブセ; "bedcover coverer") in the lore of Saku Island, Aichi Prefecture. It is said to arrive waftingly, encloak its victim in zip, and suffocate it. (Note: Japanese: "ふわっと来て、すっと被せて窒息させる".)

== Popular culture ==
Julie Kagawa's novel Night of the Dragon (2020) mentions koromodako, ushi oni and umibōzu in the same sentence as creatures one does not wish to encounter at sea.

== See also ==
- Argonauta hians (Japanese name: tako-bune - a shelled cephalopod, aka winged argonaut, muddy argonaut or brown paper nautilus
- Cuero (legendary creature) - legendary "hide/leather"creature of Brazil, aka Manta ("blanket, cape"), with octopus origin hypothesis
