= Coi Coi-Vilu =

Nature god in Mapuche tradition

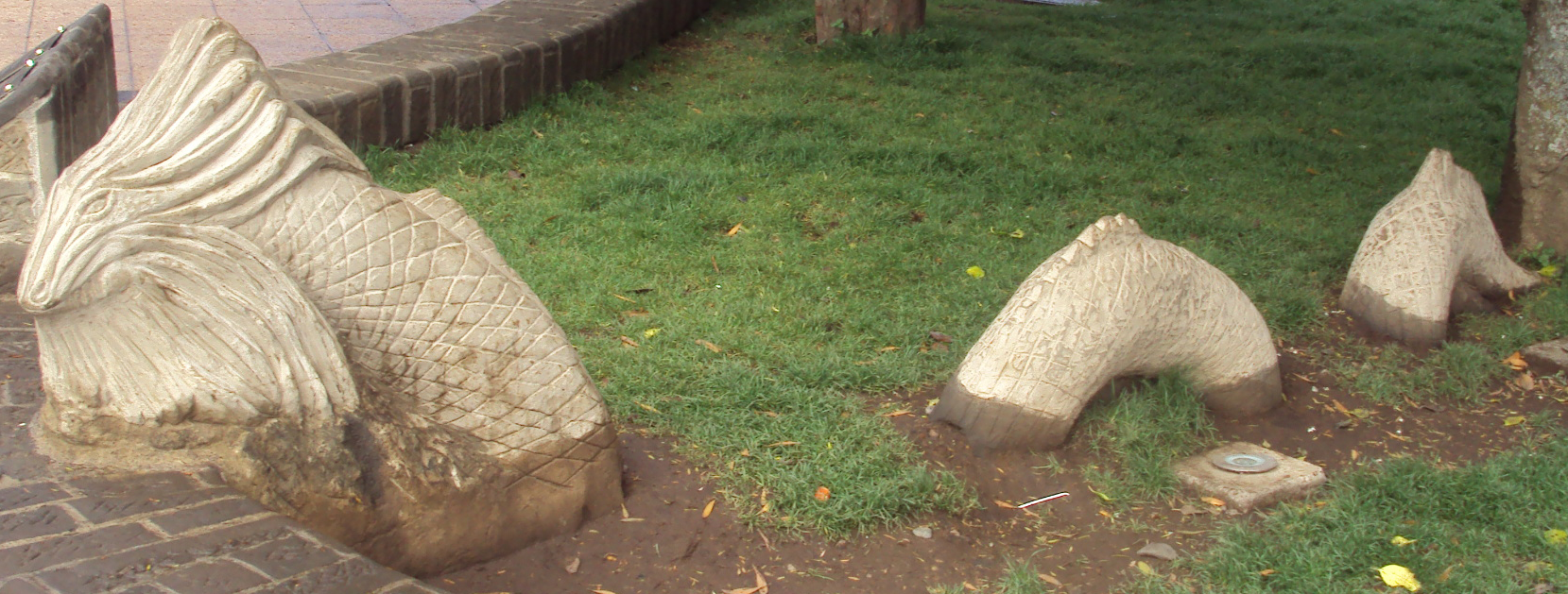
Statue of Cai Cai-Vilu at Plaza de Armas, Ancud, Chile

Coi Coi-Vilu or Caicai-Vilu/Cai Cai Vilu (from Mapudungun: Kaykayfilu; Kaykay, a name, and filu, "snake") is the Mapuche god of water (or goddess, in some versions found in Chiloé) and, according to Mapuche myths (later also found in Chiloé), supreme ruler of the sea and of all sea-dwellers. This snake was a central figure in the origin of the Chiloean Archipelago. In Mapuche mythology, Coi Coi-Vilu is son of Peripillan (a Pillan).

Some legends state that it is a parent of the mythical Trauco.

== In popular culture ==
In the final shot in the trailer of Nahuel and the Magic Book by Latido Films, the Caicai raise to the ocean as Nahuel hugged an unconscious friend Fresia.

Titan X, the main adversary of Monarch: Legacy of Monsters' season 2, is referred to as "Co-Cai".

== See also ==
- Bakunawa
- Chilota mythology
- Horned Serpent
- Kaikaifilu, an extinct genus of mosasaurs named after the deity
- Kaikaifilusaurus, an extinct genus of rhynchocephalians named after the deity
- Mapuche mythology
- Ten Ten-Vilu
- Jiaolong
- Dragon King
