= Élie Catherine Fréron =

French writer (1718–1776)

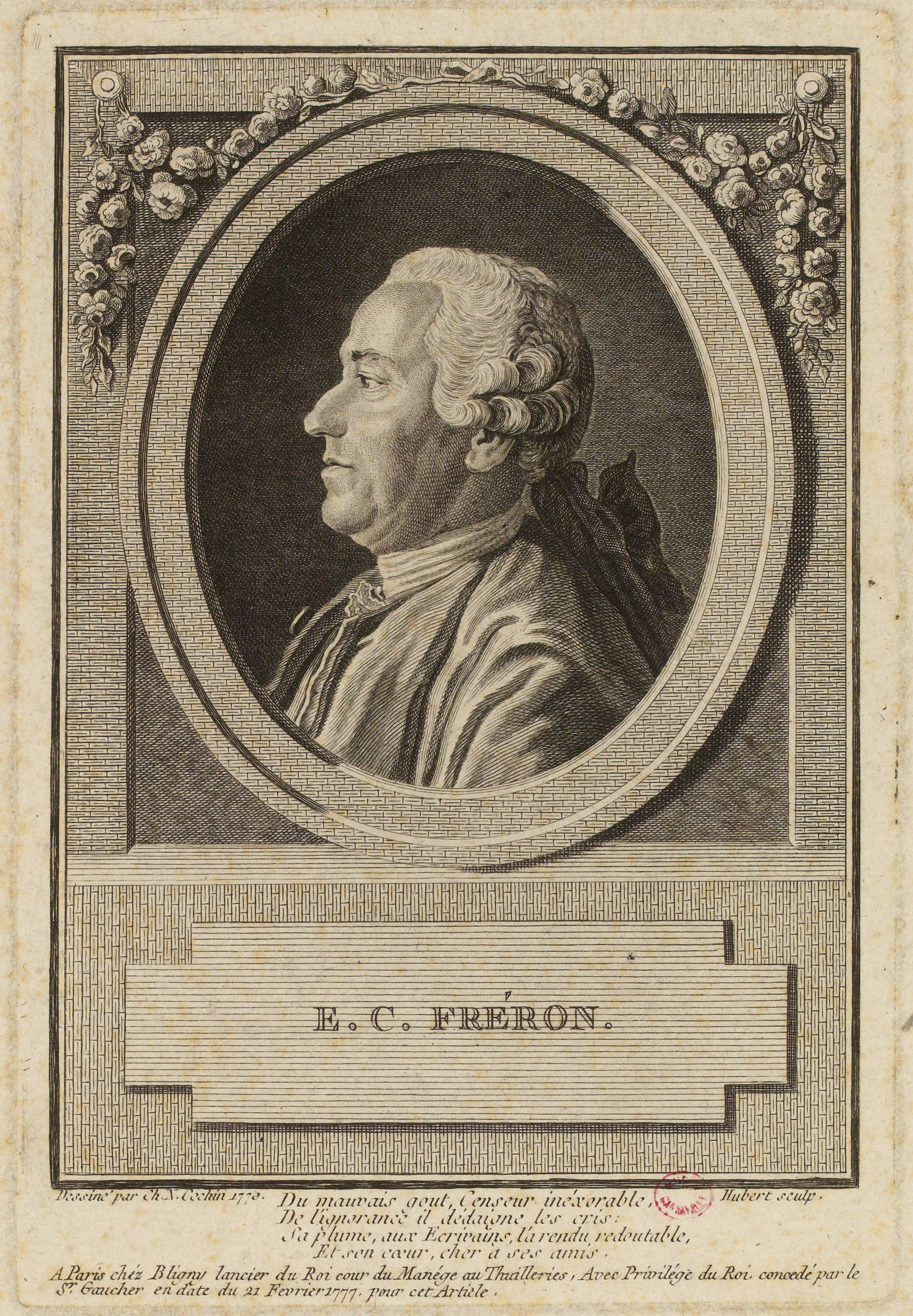
Élie Fréron

Élie Catherine Fréron (French pronunciation: [eli katʁin fʁeʁɔ̃]; 20 January 1718 – 10 March 1776) was a French literary critic and controversialist whose career focused on countering the influence of the philosophes of the French Enlightenment, partly through his vehicle, the Année littéraire. Thus Fréron, in recruiting young writers to counter the literary establishment became central to the movement now called the Counter-Enlightenment.

== Biography ==
Fréron was born at Quimper in Brittany and educated by the Jesuits. He made such rapid academic progress that he was appointed professor at the college of Louis-le-Grand before he turned twenty. He became a contributor to the Observations sur les écrits modernes of the abbé Pierre Desfontaines. The very fact of his collaboration with Desfontaines, one of Voltaire's bitterest enemies, was sufficient to arouse the latter's hostility, and although Fréron had begun his career as one of his admirers, his attitude towards Voltaire soon changed.

Fréron in 1746 founded a similar journal of his own, entitled Lettres de la Comtesse de ... It was suppressed in 1749, but he immediately replaced it by Lettres sur quelques écrits de ce temps, which, with the exception of a short suspension in 1752, on account of an attack on the character of Voltaire, was continued till 1754, when it was succeeded by the more ambitious Année littéraire. His death at Paris in 1776 is said to have been hastened by the temporary suppression of this journal. (Note: For Fréron's publications, see Jack Censer, The French Press in the Age of Enlightenment (London) 1994, pp 102–10.)

== Legacy ==
Fréron is now remembered solely for his attacks on Voltaire and the Encyclopaedists, and for the retaliation from Voltaire, who, besides attacking Fréron in epigrams, and even incidentally in some of his tragedies, directed against him a virulent satire, Le Pauvre diable, and made him the principal personage in a comedy L'Ecossaise, in which the journal of Fréron is designated L'Âne littéraire, "the Literary Ass". Fréron is also mentioned in Voltaire's famous novel Candide, in reference to a rude critic the title character meets at a theater. A further attack on Fréron entitled Anecdotes sur Fréron ... (1760), published anonymously, is generally attributed to Voltaire.

Fréron was the author of an Ode sur la bataille de Fontenoy (1745) Histoire de Marie Stuart (1742, 2 vols.); and Histoire de l'empire d'Allemagne (1771, 8 vols.).

He was the father of Stanislas Fréron, revolutionary politician.

== Works ==
- 1742: Histoire de Marie Stuart, with abbé de Marsy.
- 1745: Ode sur la bataille de Fontenoy.
- 1746: Lettres de la comtesse de ***.
- 1749–1750 and 1752–1754, Lettres sur quelques écrits de ce temps, with Joseph de La Porte, 13 vol.
- 1753: Opuscules, 3 vol.
- 1754–1790: L'Année littéraire, 290 vol.
- 1771: Histoire de l'empire d'Allemagne, 8 vol.

== Bibliography ==
- Jean Balcou, Fréron contre les philosophes, Geneva, Droz, 1975.
- Jean Balcou, Le Dossier Fréron. Correspondances et documents, Geneva, Droz, 1975.
- Jean Balcou, Sophie Barthélemy et André Cariou (dir.), Fréron, polémiste et critique d'art, Collection Interférences, 2001 ISBN 2-86847-528-0.
- François Cornou, Elie Fréron (1718–1775), Trente années de luttes contre Voltaire et les philosophes du XVIII, Paris (Champion) et Quimper (Le Goazion), 1922. Review by Louis Marcel in the Revue d'histoire de l'Église de France, 1922, vol. 8, n° 41, pp. 476–479, available at le site Persée.
- Charles Monselet, Fréron ou l'illustre critique, Paris, R. Pincebourde, 1864.
- Julien Trévédy, Fréron et sa famille d'après des documents authentiques & inédits rectifiant toutes les biographies, Saint-Brieuc, L. & R. Prud'homme, 1889.
