= Kueyen =

Principal wangulen spirit

Kueyen or kuyen is the name given to the moon in Mapuche mythology. She is the principal wangulen spirit. Kueyen governs the others wangulen spirits (spirits of the stars). Kueyen is married Antu (the Pillan spirit that represents the sun).

Mistakenly, Kueyen is also sometimes known by the name of Anchimallen (a name that makes reference to another class of mythological creatures).
