= Energy being =

Alleged life form composed of energy rather than matter

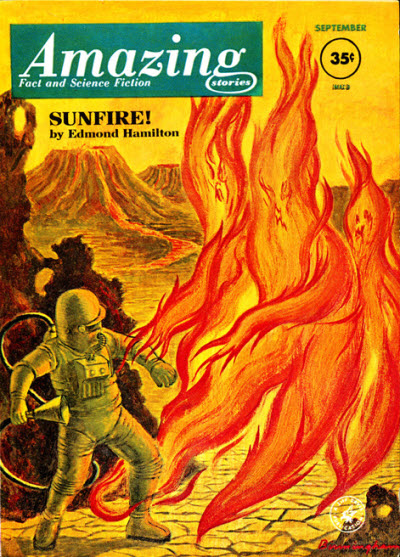
Illustration of Edmond Hamilton's 1962 short story "Sunfire!", about astronauts encountering alien creatures whose bodies are "force, rather than matter"

An energy being is a fictional or alleged life form that is composed of energy rather than matter. They appear in paranormal/UFO accounts, and in various works of speculative fiction.

== In fiction ==
It has been argued that the titular color in H.P. Lovecraft's "The Colour Out of Space" is a depiction of an energy being. In Stranger in a Strange Land, the Martians continue existing and participating in society as energy beings after death. Energy beings are also frequently portrayed in the Star Trek franchise with use of simple special effects.

== In ufology ==
Writer of the blog ET Database Scott C Waring claimed to see alien energy beings in NASA's photos of the Sun. He said that these beings were about 1.5 kilometers wide and claimed that they were feeding off of the Sun's energy. What Waring saw was likely to have been small debris floating in front of NASA's cameras.

== See also ==
- Anchimayen
- Angel
- Demon
- Divine spark
- Inward light
- Jinn
- Non-physical entity
- Spirit
