= Ngenechen =

Nature deity in Mapuche mythology and religion

Ngenechen (also known as Ngunechen, Nguenechen, Guenechen, Guinechen) is one of the most important Ngen spirits within traditional Mapuche religion; and is the most important deity in the present beliefs of the Mapuche people.

Ngenechen originally was only the Ngen spirit "governor of the Mapuche people" and not their creator god; but as a product of syncretism with Catholicism, Ngenechen is now also the "Supreme Being" in Mapuche religion, and is synonymous with the term God as used in Abrahamic religions.

== See also ==
- Antu
