= Joseph de La Porte =

French priest, literary critic, poet and playwright

Joseph de La Porte, (baptised 19 January 1714 in Belfort – died 19 December 1779) was an 18th-century French priest, literary critic, poet and playwright.

A member of the Society of Jesus, abbot de La Porte first worked to some periodical publications, in society with Fréron and, among others, with L'Année littéraire.

Temporarily in bad relation with Fréron, abbot de La Porte began in 1758 to publish l'Observateur littéraire. The first sheet of this periodical for the year 1761, including Voltaire, implacable enemy of Freron, speaking of "a masterpiece of its kind," contained an article on l’Année littéraire, a newspaper where Father La Porte saw "a designed plot consisting of censorship, debasing, and decrying the masterpieces, and placing our most famous writers below more obscure literators."

A prolific author, abbot de La Porte also wrote a large number of books and compilations. His first writing was the Voyage au séjour des ombres, critical book that had some success. He then made a periodical entitled Observations sur la littérature moderne as it applied to contradict Fréron.

His compilation of world travels LE VOYAGEUR FRANÇAIS, ou la connaissance de l'ancien et du nouveau monde (THE FRENCH TRAVELER, or the knowledge of the old and the new world), is a fiction based in real voyages. The author was never a traveler, he was an expert in travel literature. Rather than telling other people's travels, La Porte chooses another formula: he introduces himself as "the Traveler", and, writing letters from his places of residence to a certain "Madame", uses Traveler Relations, real those, to furnish her souvenirs in her dressing-gown. And he pepper his story of the meeting of some other characters. And due to its objectivity, many historians have cited him as a primary source, when his text is of secondary or referential source.

== Works ==
- undated: Almanach chinois, ou Coup d’œil curieux sur la religion, les sciences, les arts, le commerce, les mœurs et les usages de l’Empire de la Chine, Pékin; et Paris, Duchesne
- 1727–1728: Almanach du Parnasse, Paris, Flahaut et Vve Pissot
- 1775: Anecdotes dramatiques, Paris, Veuve Duchesne; réimp. Geneva, Slatkine, 1971
- 1763: Description des tableaux [-Description des ouvrages de sculpture] exposés au salon du Louvre, avec des remarques par une société d’amateurs, Paris, Mercure de France.
- 1776: Dictionnaire dramatique, contenant l’histoire des théâtres, les règles du genre dramatique, les observations des maîtres les plus célèbres et des réflexions nouvelles sur les spectacles, Paris, Lacombe.
- 1767: Du Mahométisme, ou de la Vie, de la religion et de la politique de Mahomet et de ses sectateurs, [S. l. n. d.]
- 1767: École de littérature, tirée de nos meilleurs écrivains, Paris, Babuty fils.
- 1762: Esprit de Bourdaloue, tiré de ses sermons et de ses pensées, Paris, C.-J.B. Bauche.
- 1764: Esprit, maximes et principes de Jean-Jacques Rousseau, Neuchâtel, Libraires associés.
- 1769: Histoire littéraire des femmes françoises, ou Lettres historiques et critiques contenant un précis de la vie et une analyse raisonnée des ouvrages des femmes qui se sont distinguées dans la littérature françoise, avec l’abbé J.-Fr. de La Croix, de Compiègne, Paris, Lacombe.
- 1751: L’Antiquaire, comedy in 3 acts, Paris, A. Aubry, 1870.
- 1758: La France littéraire, contenant les noms et les ouvrages des gens de lettres, des sçavans et des artistes célèbres françois... pour l’année 1758, Paris, Duchesne.
- 1756: La Revue des feuilles de M. Fréron... lettres à Mme de ***, 1st part. Analyse de quelques bons ouvrages philosophiques, précédée de réflexions sur la critique. 2nd part of the Revue des feuilles de M. Fréron, London.
- 1765: Le Portefeuille d’un homme de goût, ou l’Esprit de nos meilleurs poëtes, Amsterdam; Paris, Vincent.
- 1769: L’Esprit de l’Encyclopédie ou Choix des articles les plus curieux, les plus agréables, les plus piquants, les plus philosophiques de ce grand dictionnaire, Genève, Briasson.
- 1764: L’Esprit des monarques philosophes : Marc-Aurèle, Julien, Stanislas et Frédéric, Amsterdam, Vincent.
- 1751: Observations sur l’Esprit des loix, ou L’art de lire ce livre, de l’entendre et d’en juger, Amsterdam, Pierre Mortier.
- 1751: Observations sur la littérature moderne, Paris, Duchesne.
- 1751: Recueil de poësies nouvelles, London [i.e. Paris?].
- 1766: Ressource contre l’ennui, ou l’Art de briller dans les conversations, The Hague; Paris, Vve Duchesne.
- 1749: Suite du voyage au séjour des ombres. À Madame D***, The Hague.
- 1757: Tableau de l’Empire ottoman, Paris, Duchesne.
- 1765: Le Voyageur francois, ou la Connaissance de l Ancien et le Nouveau Monde, Paris, Moutard, reprint 1795.

== Sources ==
- Gustave Vapereau, Dictionnaire universel des littératures, Paris, Hachette, 1876, (p. 1190)
