= Wekufe =

Spirit or demon in Mapuche mythology

The wekufe, also known as huecufe, wekufü, watuku, huecufu, huecubo, huecubu, huecuvu, huecuve, huecovoe, giiecubu, güecubo, güecugu, uecuvu, güecufu; is an important type of harmful spirit or demon in Mapuche mythology. The word wekufe comes from the Mapudungun word wekufü meaning "demon, outside being".

== Concept ==
In the Mapuche language, Mapudungun, the word wekufe can be attributed to any person that tells lies or is deceptive. It was only after the arrival of Catholicism that the word became associated with demons.

Since that time the idea behind wekufe has broadened to include multiple meanings, either as a subject, quality or agent depending on the speaker's reference point or the situation that it is used in. The word is generally used as a generic name in order to describe creatures from Mapuche mythology that usually have harmful intentions towards human beings.

These beings can have solid, material bodies, evanescent ghost-like bodies or be extracorporeal spirit-like entities. They project from or originate in the wekufe's energy, which is characterized by its propensity to disturb and/or destroy the balance of the world's natural order. In this way they cause illness, destruction, death, and other calamities amongst the Mapuche. Wekufes are often incorrectly likened to beings with similar characteristics such as the gualichos or the demons of Greek or other mythologies.

The missionaries who followed the Spanish conquistadors to America interpreted the Mapuche beliefs regarding both wekufes and gualichos in the context of their own religion. They used the word wekufe as a synonym for the devil, demons, and other evil or diabolical forces.

== Wekufe legend ==
Mapuche legends say that wekufes come from Minchenmapu, which is located to the west beyond Mapu (the Mapuche word for land, although in this instance it refers to the land described by the traditional Mapuche worldview). These beings originated from the forces or energies that disturb and/or destroy the world's natural order. Unlike other living beings or spirits that possess their own soul, wekufes are soulless.

Wekufes entered the Mapu world as a consequence of the mythical battle amongst the Pillán spirits, which resulted in the breaking of the Admapu (system of rules that define Mapuche behaviour) and the destruction of the perfect harmony of the Wenumapu (world of goodness). This battle also disrupted the land of Minchenmapu allowing the wekufes and the Laftraches, which had previously been confined there, to escape and roam the Mapu and live in the Mag Mapu (the world of evil, to the west of Mapu). The best known of the wekufes are Trelke-wekufe (El Cuero or cow hide), and Canillo, both of which are powerful wekufes with the ability to change into solid form.

=== Relationship with kalkus ===
The Mapuche believe that many wekufes allow themselves to be manipulated by kalkus (Mapuche sorcerers, equivalent to witches or wizards who work with black magic), who use them as a mystic medium for obtaining power. The wekufes allow the kalkus to use them to cause the illness or death of certain chosen people. It is said that a powerful kalku will inherit a wekufe spirit from an ancestor who was also a kalku. However, in order to be able to use a wekufe, a kalku must voluntarily become the servant of the wekufe.

In order to use a wekufe to make someone ill, a kalku must introduce the wekufe into the body of the victim. This is generally achieved by using a small fragment of wood, or straw, or part of a lizard's body, or directly through an attack by ghost-like forms or disembodied spirits that direct the disruptive wekufe energy towards the victim.

=== Relationship with the dead ===
The wekufe also have the power to capture and enslave the pillú (spirit of the recently deceased that is reluctant to leave its body) before it transforms into an alwe (more mature spirit). A kalku can also take advantage of this power by using a wekufe as a means for trapping a pillú. Once it is trapped a pillú can also be used to hurt other people.

=== Relationship with ancient spirits ===
Wekufes can also be controlled by the Pillan and Ngen spirits, or at least these spirits will allow the wekufes to harm a Mapuche if they have broken one of the spirit's rules by: behaving badly, not carrying out the guillatún ritual (a form of prayer thanking the spirits for their beneficence, asking for well being etc.), mocking or disbelieving a Machi (Mapuche shaman), eating food that was caught or harvested without previously asking for permission from the Ngen of the animal, vegetable, or mineral that was consumed, or most importantly by not respecting the laws of the admapu.

=== Protection and healing ===
In the Mapuche tradition a person who has a wekufe in their body is called kalüleluuk'len ("to be in the body") in the sacred, secret language of the Machi. The machitún ceremony must be performed in order to release the wekufe.

As long as the Mapuche people obey the admapu laws and perform the guillatún ceremony, then the Ngen and Pillán spirits will continue to keep the wekufe under control.

Equally, in order to identify and gain protection from a kalku that may be using a wekufe, one should be cautious of people wearing black as this is the only color worn by kalkus.

In the more southerly regions, it was said that the wekufe, (Note: Given as "los huécuvus".) serving the Pillán, bringing disease to the hut (ruca), the cattle, and the fields could only be exorcised by burning the foiqe (Note: Given as "foighe".) or cinnamon branches.

== Other uses for the word wekufe ==
The term Uecuvu Mapu or Wekufe Mapu is often translated as Land of the Devil and it is also used in toponymy to indicate especially inhospitable areas in Comahue and Patagonia. For example, the cold, deserted area located around coordinates 36°22′S 68°43′W between the south east of Mendoza Province and La Pampa Province in Argentina. Another "Uecuvu Mapu" is located on the desolate and windy plateaus of central Patagonia.

== See also ==
- Daeva
- Huecuva
- Pillan
