= Pillan =

Powerful male spirit in Mapuche mythology

The Pillan (of Mapudungun origin; Spanish: pillán, plural pillanes) are powerful and respected male spirits in Mapuche mythology.

According to legend, the Pillan are good spirits, but they can also cause disasters, since they also punish (or they allow the wekufe to punish) with drought or flood, earthquakes, or diseases. The Antü is the most powerful Pillan, who governs the others. In the Mapuche tradition, a man that follows the laws of the admapu can also become a Pillan after death. The Mapuche perform a ngillatun ceremony for the Pillan, for the latter to grant benefits to the people, and to thank them for their gifts.

The Pillan have been described as spirits that live in the Wenumapu (a spiritual world of good), and those that inhabit the Earth generally live inside the volcanoes. (Example: Osorno and Quetrupillán Volcano). The accompanying female spirits of the Pillan are the Wangulen spirits.

The name Pillan was used by Chilean ENAER to name their 2-seat trainer aircraft, the T-35 Pillan.

== See also ==
- Choshuenco-Pillán – old name for Mocho-Choshuenco volcano
- Pillanleufú – a river near Mocho-Choshuenco
- Quetrupillán – a strato volcano near Pucón and Coñaripe.
- Rucapillán – mapudungun name for Villarrica volcano
