= Mapuche religion =

Religion of the indigenous Mapuche people of South America

The Kultrul

Mapuche religion is the traditional Native American religion of the Mapuche people. It is practiced primarily in south-central Chile and southwest Argentina. The tradition has no formal leadership or organizational structure and displays much internal variation.

Mapuche theology incorporates a range of deities and spirits. One of the most prominent deities is Ngünechen, sometimes equated with the Christian God. Communal prayer ceremonies are termed ngillatun and involve the provision of offerings and animal sacrifice. Various different ritual specialists were historically active among the Mapuche, but in the 20th century many of these died out, leaving the machi as the main kind. These machi are tasked with overseeing healing and divination, tasks accomplished through their communication with spirits.

Historically, the Mapuche were politically independent and prevented conquest by the Incan and Spanish Empires. In 1883 the Chilean military defeated the Mapuche and began to restrict them to reservations. Chilean efforts were then made to convert the Mapuche to Catholicism. From the 1990s, Mapuche religion underwent a revitalisation, with greater visibility and efforts to use it to encourage tourism.

== Definitions and terminology ==
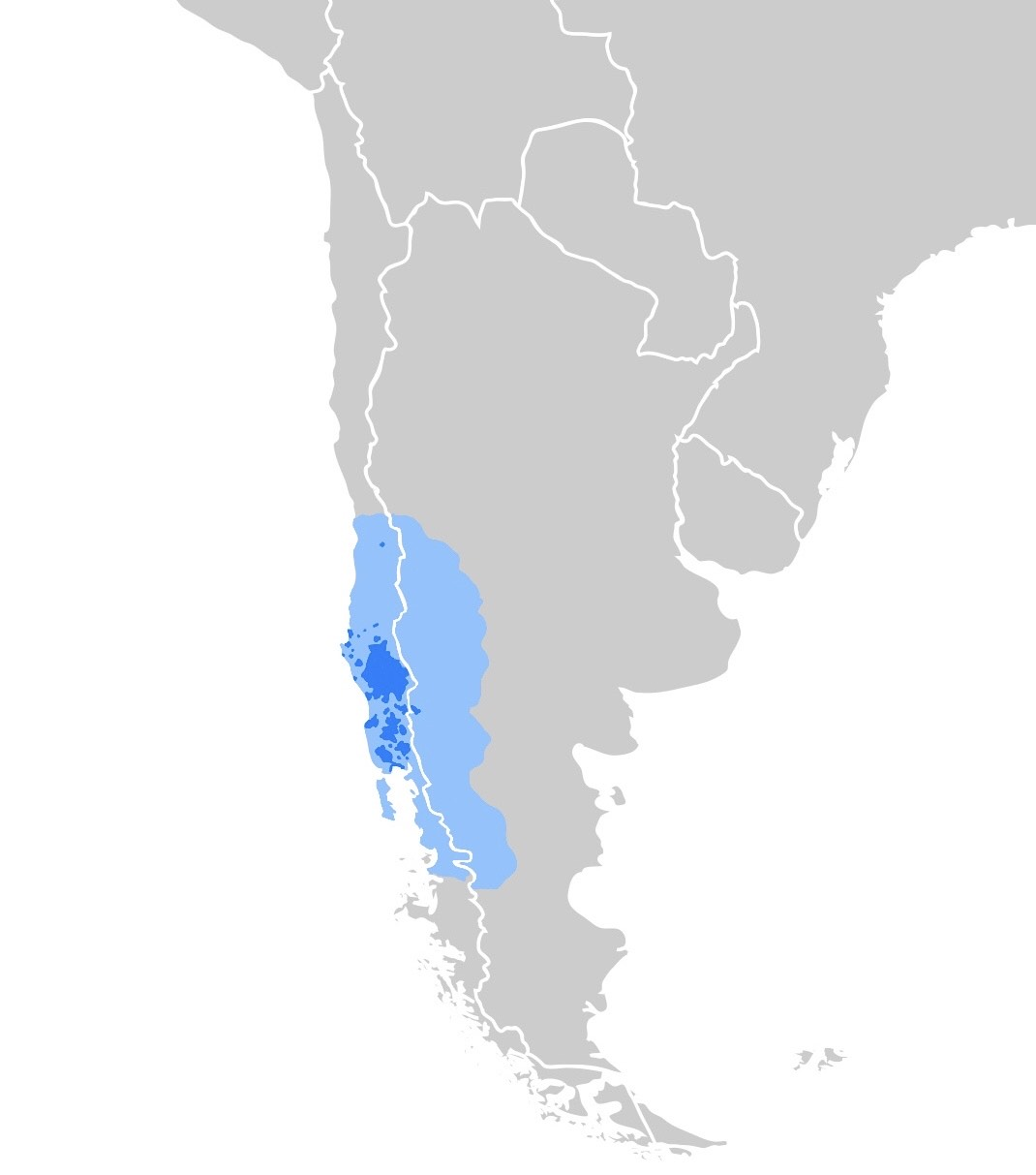
The area of South America where the Mapuche language is spoken. Dark blue areas indicate it as the majority language, light blue as a minority language

Mapuche religion is not institutional. In Latin America, traditional religions are rarely pure, unadulterated continuations from the traditions that existed prior to European contact. The term "Mapuche," found in the Mapuche language, means "people of the land". Another term for this people, used by the Spanish colonialists, was the Araucanians. Contemporary Mapuche people are largely bilingual, speaking both their own language, Mapudungan, and Spanish, the main colonial language of the region.

There are no written records about Mapuche ancient legends and myths from before the Spanish arrival, since their religious beliefs were passed down orally. Their beliefs are not necessarily homogenous; among different ethnic groups, and the families, villages, and territorial groups within those ethnic groups, there are variations and differences and discrepancies in these beliefs. Many of the Mapuche beliefs have been integrated into the myths and legends of Chilean folklore, and to a lesser extent, folklore in some areas of Argentina. Many of these beliefs have been altered and influenced by Christianity, due largely to the evangelization done by Spanish missionaries. This happened chiefly through the syncretism of these beliefs and also through misinterpretation or adaptation within both Chilean and Argentine societies. This syncretism has brought about several variations and differences of these core beliefs as they have become assimilated within Chilean, Argentine and even Mapuche culture. Today, these cultural values, beliefs and practices are still taught in some places with an aim to preserve different aspects of this indigenous Mapuche culture.

== Beliefs ==
=== Theology ===
Mapuche traditional religion features a pantheon of gods and goddesses. The Meli Küyen are the four moon spirits; the Meli Wangülen are the four spirits of the stars. The wenu püllüam are ancestral spirits in the sky.

Ngünechen is also known as Chaw Dios (Old Man God) and Ñuke Dios (Old Woman God). Ngünechen first appeared in Mapuche religion during the 19th century; it has been argued that the introduction of this deity was a response to the Chilean national hierarchies. The root of this divinity's name, genche, first appeared in 1601 to describe a Spanish landowner. Many Mapuche equate Ngünechen with the Christian God, although other Mapuche traditionalists stress they are different.

The ngen are nature spirits. They populate the earth and are in turn prayed to by other spirits. These ngen are the owners of particular environments and can capture, possess, and punish those who enter their realms without permission. The foki spirits are intermediaries between the forest and humanity, connecting the two through the rainbow. Like humans, the foki engage in prayer.

Both the deities and other spirits are thought to have both good and bad sides. The gods and spirits can grant wealth, good harvests, and fertility if propitiated with offerings. If people fail to provide offerings or transgress norms called admapu, Mapuche traditionalists believe that deities and spirits can punish people with illness, scarcity, or infertility.

Various wekufe spirits kill humans. The sumpall is a blond mermaid who seduces men into the river, where it kills them and steals their souls. The witranalwe takes the form of a thin Spaniard on a horse; his wife is the small, luminescent añchümalleñ, who sucks people's blood. The Punkure and Punfüta are spouses who seduce their victims in their dreams to drain their life energy.

Sun and moon worship among the Mapuche have parallels among the Central Andean peoples and the Inca religion. Indeed, in among Mapuches as well as Central Andean peoples the moon (Mama Killa, Cuyen in Mapudungun) and the sun (Inti, Antu in Mapudungun) are spouses. Mapuche, Quechua and Aymara words for the sun and the moon appear to be a borrowing from Puquina language. Thus the parallels in cosmology may be traced back to the days of the Tiwanaku Empire in which Puquina is thought to have been an important language.

=== Cosmology ===
In Mapuche traditional belief, the cosmos consists of three vertical planes, each comprising a different force that remains in conflict with the other two. The upper realm is termed the wenu mapu and is associated with goodness, purity, and the forces of creation. Located in the sky and containing the sun and the moon, it is the home of the gods and the ancestral spirits. It is associated with the colors white, yellow, and blue.

The earth is called mapu and it is here that the struggle between good and evil takes place. Mapu is associated with the colors green and blood red. The underworld beneath mapu is termed munche mapu, a realm associated with evil, death, destruction, and pollution. It is also associated with volcanic eruptions, whirlwinds, and cemeteries, as well as the colors bright red and opaque black. It is in munche mapu that the wekufe spirits live.

The word Wallmapu originally meant "Universe" as well as "set of surrounding lands".

=== Soul and the ancestors ===
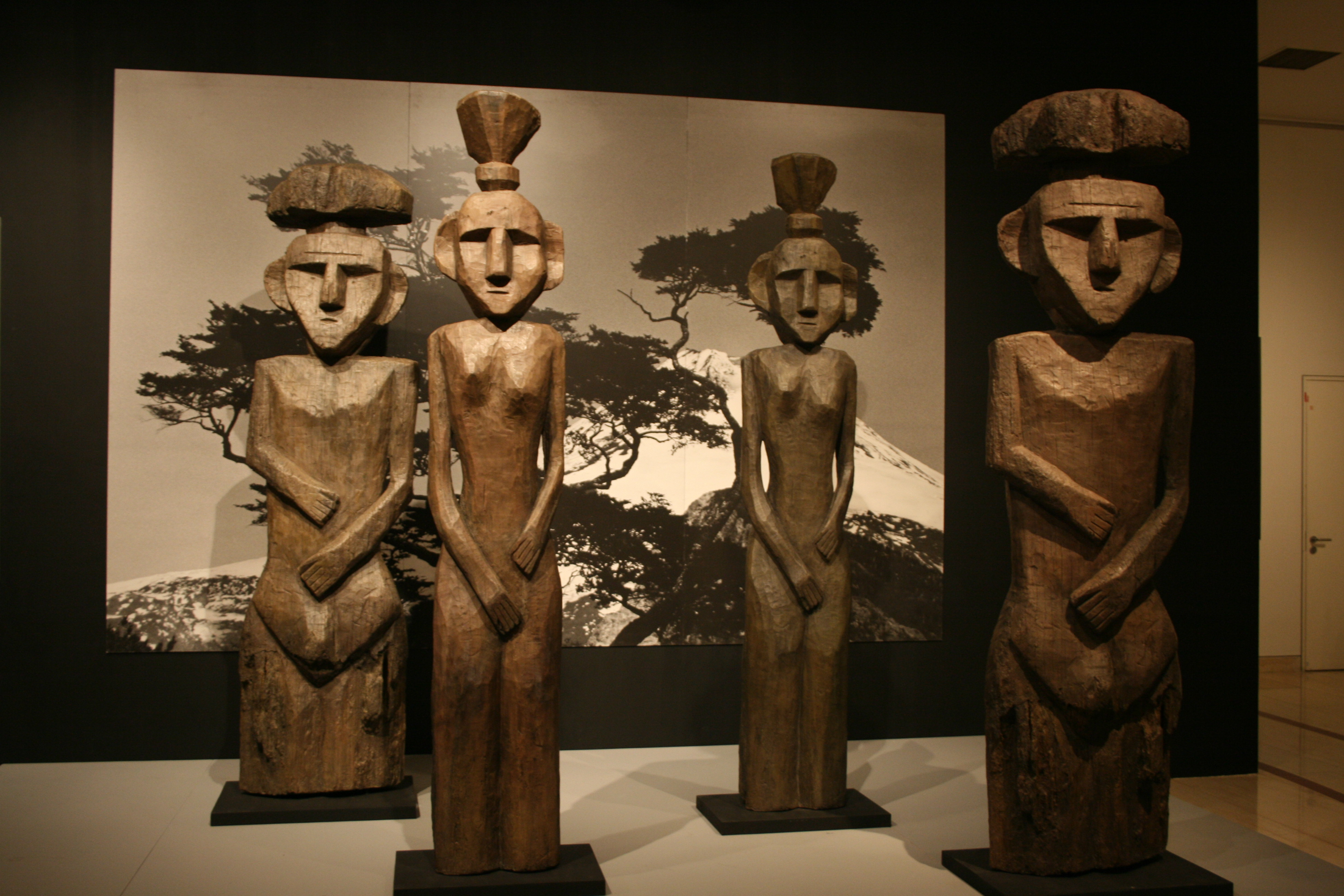
Mapuche funerary statues on display at a museum in Beijing

Mapuche traditional religion teaches that humans, other animals, and natural phenomena all have a trata, or body, as well as a distinct spiritual essence. The living soul is called a püllü, while humans also have a soul that survives bodily death, the am. According to the traditional belief, Mapuche people fear that their spirit can be captured and manipulated by a wekufe spirit or a witch; spirits of the dead can for instance be captured and polluted by witches unless they are appropriately dispatched to the afterlife.

The spirits of the dead can reside in an eternal shadow realm. The continuing relationship of mutual dependence between the living and their ancestors is an important facet of Mapuche traditional religion. Propitiating these ancestors is thus a key ritual among Mapuche traditionalists. If ancestral spirits do not feel they are being acknowledged, they may return to the land of the living to remind their descendants of their obligations.

There are differing views among scholars on whether ancestors play a significant role in Mapuche religion. Wine or chicha is regularly poured for the ancestors.

=== Morality and ethics ===
In traditional Mapuche culture, the transgression of social norms or the failure to fulfil commitments to kin, ancestors, and gods can result in individual and social illness as well as social chaos. Rural Mapuche women often place great emphasis on modesty. In Mapuche society, men are permitted to have multiple wives.

== Practices ==
Prayers are called ngillatunes. The prayers of the machi are usually in their native Mapudungu language, although rituals and other situations will often see them use both Mapudungu and Spanish. There are often taboos on photographing traditional rituals. Prior to the Chilean colonial conquest of the Mapuche, there were an array of different ritual specialists.

=== Ngillatun ===
The ngillatun has been described as "the main rituals" of contemporary Mapuche religion. The whole community takes part in the ngillatun rituals, which occur within a consecrated space. These involve prayers and animal sacrifices and are believed to maintain balance among cosmic forces and avoid catastrophe. The ngillatun ritual is designed to ensure cosmic wholeness, and is often performed both before and after the harvest.

The ngillatuwe is the collective altar; it is also called la cruza (the cross). It takes the form of a pole with the face and arms of either Ngünechen or an ancestor carved on it; it will face east and is thought to protect the community. A Catholic priest will often bless it after it has been erected. White and blue crosses, representing the powers of the sky, are often planted beside it. The ngillatuwe represents an axis mundi. It is located inside the ngillatun fields, which are deemed sacred and left uncultivated. If the ngillatuwe is destroyed it is believed that catastrophe will befall both the person responsible and the community to whom it belongs.

Until the early 20th century, the ngillatun was often led by male community elders known as ngenpin (orators). By the 21st century, the ngenpin were still officiating in the Pewenche and Williche areas but machi were instead doing so in the areas of the south-central valleys and the Andean foothills.

The ngillatun ritual can take over two days to complete. Those participating will typically wear Mapuche traditional clothing and may have their faces painted. During the ceremony, prayers are offered to Ngünechen, with offerings of maize, beans, and muday placed at the foot of the ngillatuwe. An animal such as a sheep would then be sacrificed. If the community is in danger and needs important messages, machi will go into a trance at the ngillatun but this does not always happen. Those assembled will dance both in rows and in a circle around the ngillatuwe. Men on horseback perform the awün, circling the dances in imitation of the sun.

=== Ritual specialists ===
Historical accounts testify to a range of different types of ritual specialist active among Mapuche communities prior to the late 19th century. European colonial accounts indicate that the most important specialists at the time were the ampivoe or ampivavoe who invoked spirits for healing purposes, and the voiguebuyes or voiguevoyes tasked with influencing ancestral spirits and combatting witchcraft. The scholar Ricardo Latcham suggested that the ngenpin replaced the role of the voiguebuyes prior to the 19th century.

==== Machi ====
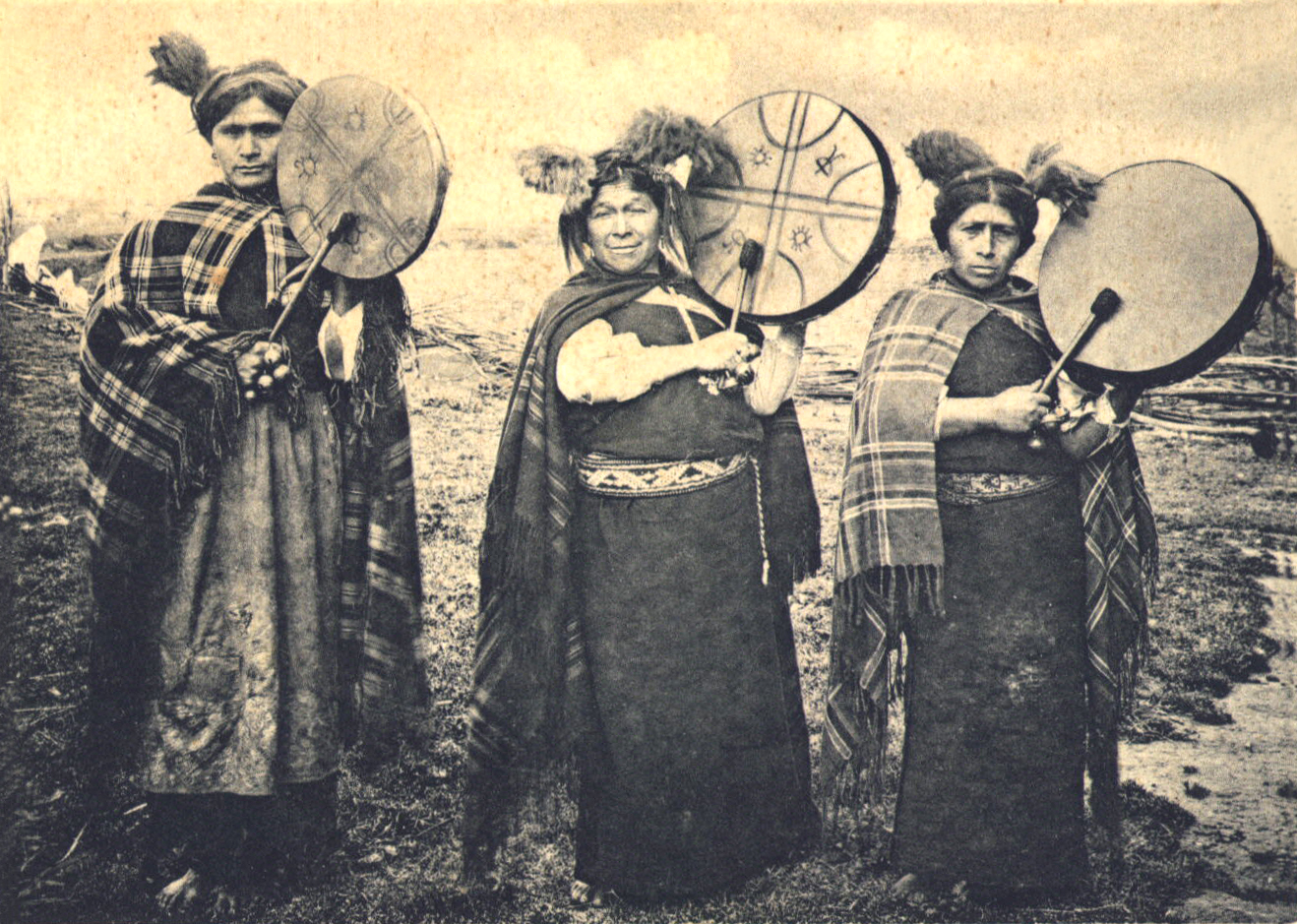
Three machis, each with a kultrun drum, photographed in 1900

By the end of the 20th century, the dominant ritual specialist in Mapuche traditional religion was the machi, a figure who is tasked with healing, divination, and participating in certain other rituals. In English language studies, various anthropologists have called the machi "shamans", although the term "shamanism" has never received a commonly agreed definition and has been used in at least four distinct ways.

The machi are believed to obtain their powers from various natural and ancestral spirits, as well as from Ngünechen. They also draw on the power of special locations, such as waterfalls, lakes, volcanoes, and the rock. They embody and travel with a spirit called a machi püllü as well as having an ancestral spirit of all the machi, the filew. Mapuche traditionalists believe that the machi are capable of using their powers for either good or evil, thus existing on a spectrum of good to bad.

Mapuche traditionalists believe that the spirits call certain individuals to become machi, sending them dreams (pewma) and visions (perimontum). The spirits may inflict an illness on the person, the machikutran, which can include boils, fever, foaming at the mouth, insomnia, partial blindness, and partial paralysis. The machikutran is only alleviated by their initiation as a machi through the machiluwün ritual. As the spirits are insistent, it is thought difficult for a person to resist them, although some people do. Through visions and dreams, the spirits reveal the use of herbs to the prospective machi and then give them their ritual tools for healing, such as the drum and their spirit animals.

Machis may experience their initiation through various ways. They may inherit their machi spirit from a deceased machi from their material family; experience direct initiation in the midst of a powerful natural event like an earthquake or lightning; or they may experience a vision called the perimontum in which a spirit appears before them. Those who have gained initiation through the latter two methods are considered more powerful although also more morally ambiguous.

The trance states entered by the machi are called küymi. During their rituals they typically perceive themselves as being possessed by a spirit. During possession, the spirit mounts the machi's head, a process called the longkoluupan. Sometimes, the possessing spirit is thought to convey messages from Ngünechen. The words spoken in a possessed trance state may then be interpreted by an individual, often a family members, called the dungumachife. This dungumachife will elicit information about a patient's illness and treatment. Together, the machi and dungumachife are sometimes seen to represent the Ñuke Dios and Chaw Dios respectively. Some machi use hallucinogens during their rituals, namely palo de bruja or seeds of the miyaya or chamico, although other machis are critical of this practice.

As each machi is regarded as the "spiritual bride" of their filew, they wear female-associated clothing, including blue or purple head scarves, black shawls, and silver jewellery. Bacigalupo noted that this meant that machis engaged in a form of "ritual transvestism". Machi may have sexual relationships or remain celibate; in Chilean culture they are stereotyped as homosexuals. Some find the burden of being a machi too much and abandon the profession. The machi has to periodically renew their powers through the ngeykurewen rituals or they will become ill. The ngeykurewen ritual entails renewing the ritualist's marriage ties with their filew.

===== Rewe =====
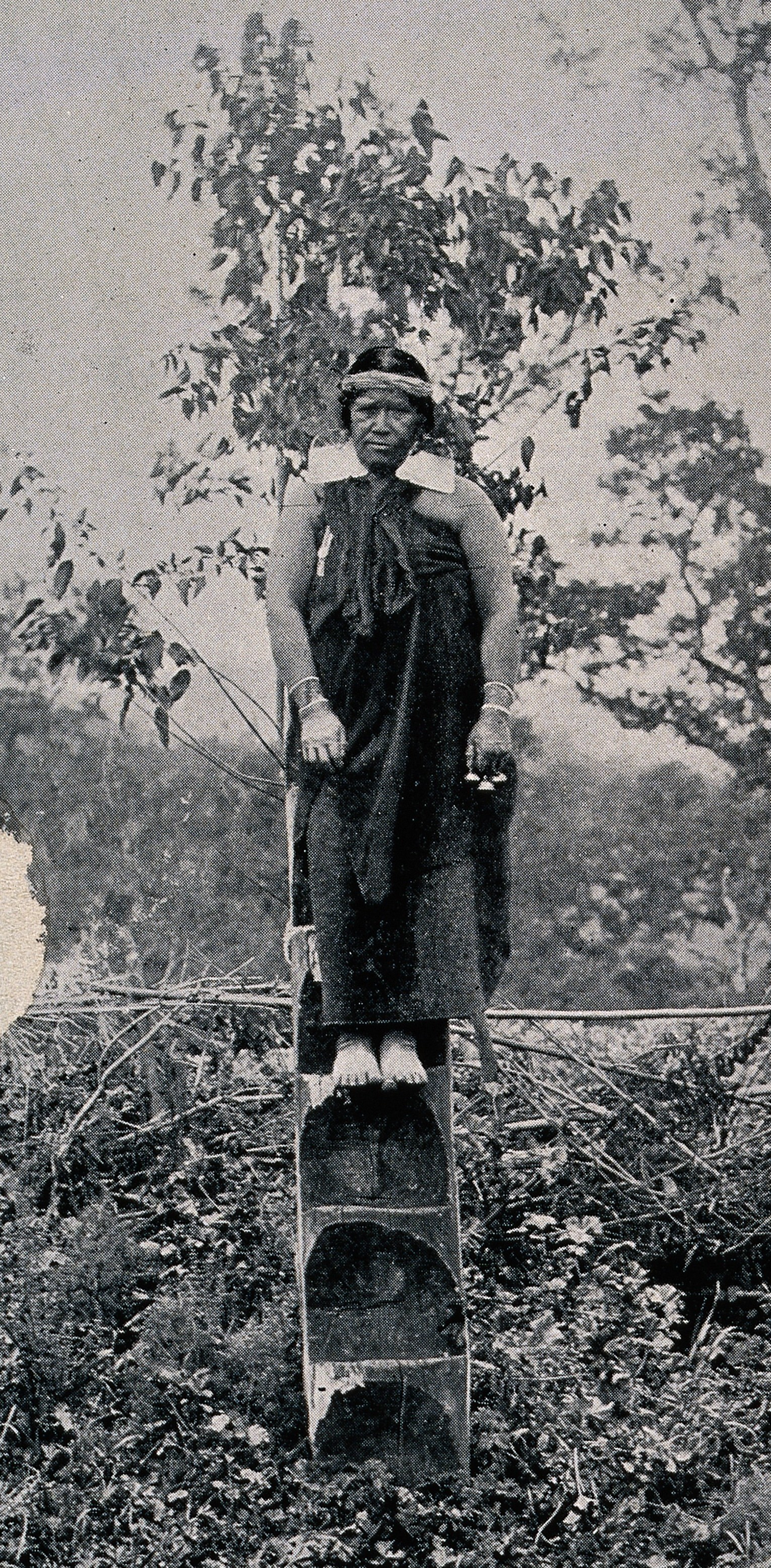
A machi standing on their rewe, the timber structure they climb onto while in a trance-state

At their home, machis will have a timber pole called a rewe ("the purest"), alternatively referred to as the foye or canelo. This usually consists of the trunk of a laurel or oak tree, into which steps have been notched. Branches of klon, triwe, foye, or coligüe will often be tied to the side. The rewe represents the axis mundi of the world, a nexus between the human and spirit worlds, and is positioned to face east.

The filew is believed to live in the rewe; kopiwe flowers, food, drink, and herbal remedies, all things regarded as female, are placed on or around the rewe to feed the rewe, while knives, volcanic rocks, and chueca sticks, all things thought male, are places atop the rewe and on its steps to protect the filew from evil spirits. It is on this pole that the machi travels to other worlds while in a trance state; during rituals, the machis ascend the steps on the rewe to inform their audience that they have entered their visionary flight. Some machis put a llang llang, a rainbow-shaped arch made from vines, above the rewe; it represents their connection with forest spirits. After the ngeykurewen, many machis place their old rewe into a river to decay, replacing it with a new one; other machis believe that their rewe should only be deposited in a river after their deaths.

The machi uses a shallow drum called a kultrun. This consists of a laurel or oak bowl with goatskin stretched across it, and is often conceptualised as a womb. Often, four items are placed inside the drum; two of these are regarded as male and may include darts, bullets, foye leaves, charcoal or volcanic rocks, while the other two are regarded as female and can include maize, seeds, wool, or kopiwe flowers. The goatskin will be decorated with a painted cross, representing the meli witran mapu, or fourfold division of the world.

=== Kalku ===
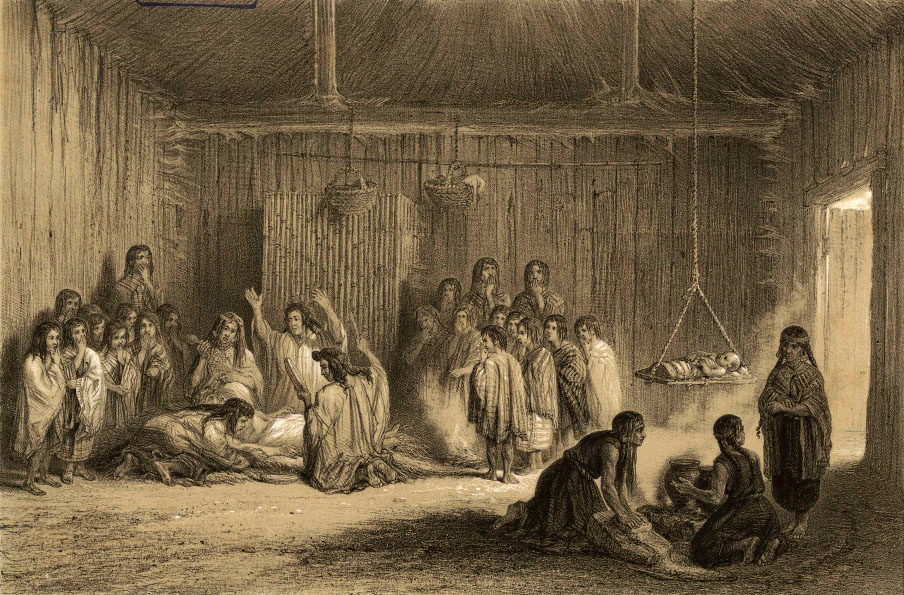
Illustration of a machi healing a patient, from Atlas of Physical and Political History of Chile (Atlas de la historia física y política de Chile), by Claudio Gay

In Mapuche society, harmful witchcraft is called kalkutun or, in Spanish, brujeria. The witch or sorcerer themselves are called a kalku. Mapuche society does not contain self-acknowledged kalku. In Mapuche lore, kalkutun can involve invoking harmful spirits through incantations; poisoning a victim by placing a substance called fuñapue into their food or drink; by adding fuñapue to an object associated with the victim, such as their hair, nail clippings, clothes, or belongings; or by putting cemetery earth on the place where the victim stands or sits. The fuñapue substance was composed of nails, hair, poisonous herbs, cemetery soil, parts of decomposing animal corpses, or pieces of worms, lizards, or frogs.

Mapuche who believe themselves afflicted by kalkutun will often hire a machi to counteract it. In the Mapuche traditional worldview, the kalku and the machi play a role in balancing the conflicting forces in the cosmos. The religion holds that the most powerful kalku are machi who succumbed to those evil spirits they were fighting. Those machi who transgress social norms or acquire significant wealth and prestige are sometimes accused of being kalku. Non-Mapuche, or wingka, are often assumed to be kalku, as they are perceived as being wealthier than most Mapuche and as valuing individual gain above communal well-being.

=== Divination ===
The machi perform divination rituals, the latter referred to as pewuntun.

=== Healing ===
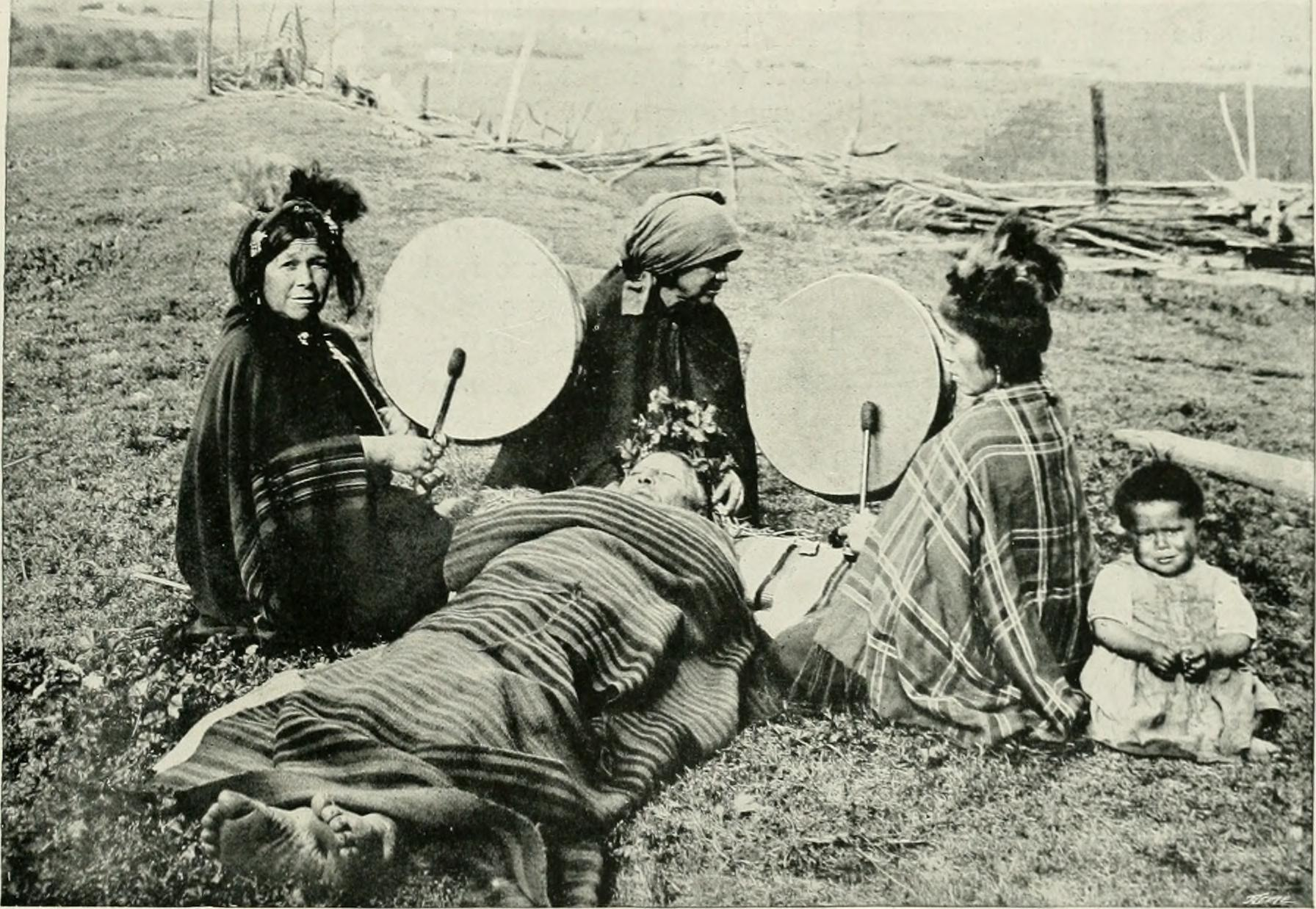
Three machi engage in a healing ritual in 1908

Various traditional health practitioners exist in Mapuche society, including machis, meicas (traditional healers), yerbateras (herbalists), hueseros (bonesetters), and suerferos (diviners). Their practices are often religiously syncretic, reflecting Christian influence. The machi's task is to diagnose the cause of an illness. To do this they will look into their patient's eyes, examine urine samples, drum over their worn clothes, or conduct the uluntun, a diagnostic ritual involving prayers, massages, and rattles. They will determine which deity, kalku, or wekufe is responsible for the ailment and how to treat it. Some evil spirits are then dispersed from the person they are harming and sent back to the individual believed to have originally sent them.

The machi healing ceremonies are called datun. The patient will pay the machi for this service; some machis have set fees, while others leave the payment to their client's discretion.

Mapuche traditionalists believe that all plants have sacred powers, and they are often collected for use in healing. Some plants are thought to have the fourfold qualities of Ngünechen. Machi may place a coin where they have taken cuttings of plants.

=== Funerals and the dead ===
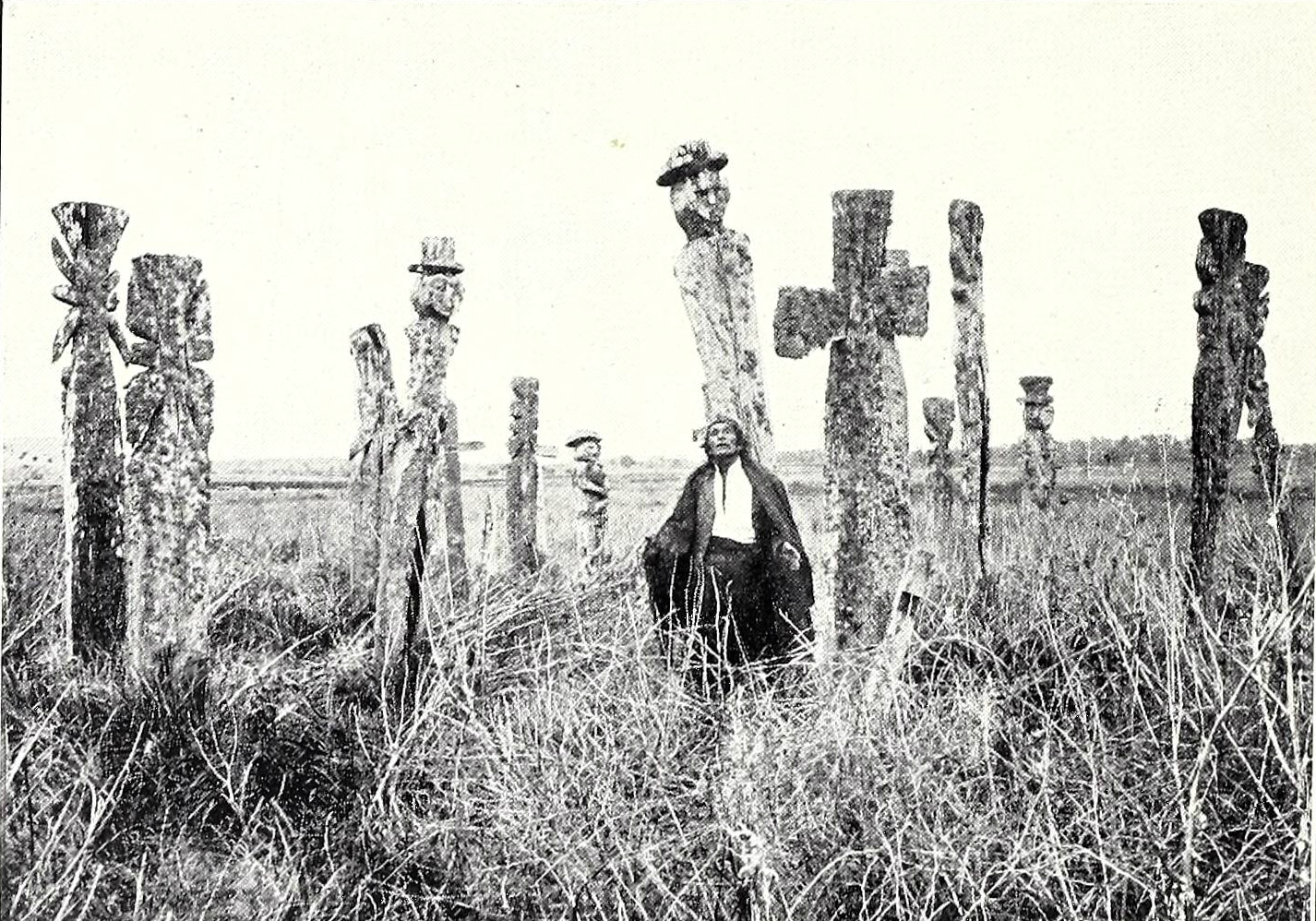
A machi photographed in a Mapuche cemetery in 1904

A funeral is called an awn. Members of the reservation often feel obliged to attend the funeral, with non-attendance casting suspicion that they may have had a hand in the individual's death. The funeral ceremony is designed to rid the living both of the deceased person's spirit and other malevolent spirits that may be lurking around at that time; if the spirit lingers among the living after death it is at risk of being captured by a witch and used for malevolent ends. During the ceremony, the ancestors are invoked and called on to protect the spirit of the recently deceased individual.

== History ==
The Mapuche resisted being conquered by both the Inca Empire, stopping the Incan invasion forces at the end of the 15th century. It has been noted that some symbols and aspects of the Andean religion are present among Mapuches and Huilliche whose lands lay well beyond the border of the former Inca Empire. A hypothesis claim an older origin in Tiwanaku for these religious commonalities.

The Mapuche subsequently also successfully resisted conquest by the Spanish Empire. Spanish accounts of the Mapuche religion were produced from the 16th to the 19th centuries, although were largely biased heavily against it and reflected a focus on both the Spanish war with the Mapuche and the efforts of Catholic missionaries to evangelise to them.

=== Modern history ===
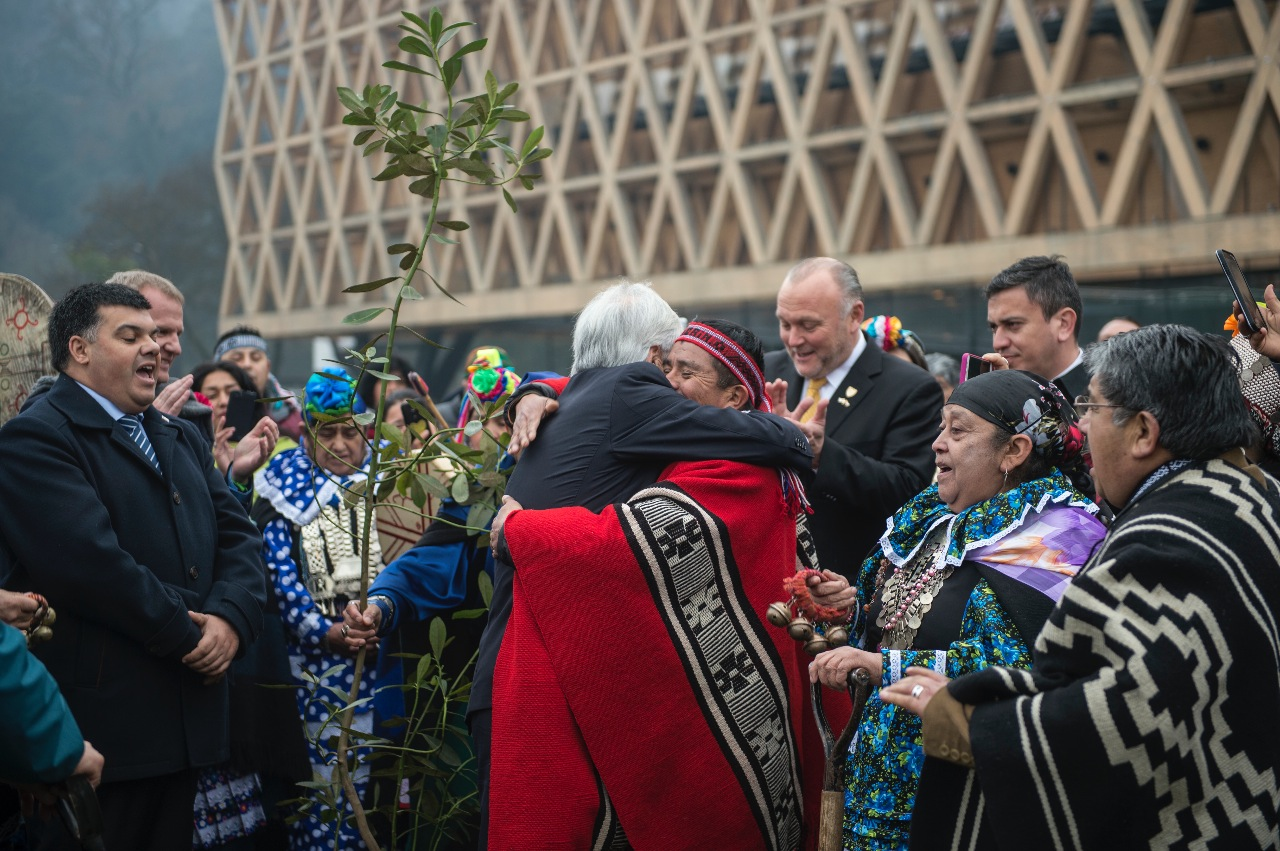
President Piñera participates in a Mapuche religious ceremony

In 1883 the Mapuche were militarily defeated by the army of Chile, a newly independent republic established by former Spanish criollos. The Chilean government moved the Mapuche into reservations and launched missions to convert them to Catholicism. On the reservations, Mapuche subsistence shifted from cattle rearing towards sedentary agriculture. Chilean colonisation brought changes to Mapuche religion. The diversity of different ritual specialists declined, leaving the machi as the only full-time specialist, while some of the functions previously performed by other ritualist being consolidated in the machi. This also brought what Degarrod called a "feminisation of the religious world". The colonial context also impacted Mapuche views of divinity.

In the latter half of the 20th century, anthropologists like Louis Faron, Maria Ester Grebe, and Mischa Titiev emphasised the continuation of the machi's practices as evidence of the Mapuche's resistance to colonisation. By 1998, Lydia Nakashima Degarrod argued that this perspective ignored the "dynamics of interaction" between the Mapuche and the conditions they were now living in.

The 1990s saw the growing influence of indigenous movements across Latin America. In 1990, Chile became a democracy and in 1993 the Indigenous Law was passed, although the Mapuche remained socioeconomically marginalised. In 2002, the scholar Cristián Parker Gumucio argued that a greater number of Mapuche were willing to admit practicing their traditional religion than in prior decades, part of a "new climate of respect and recognition". Traditional rites were continued by many Mapuche who had moved to Chilean cities.

In the 1990s, various Mapuche began commodifying aspects of their traditional religion for ethnotourism, for instance performing ceremonies for tourist audiences, arguing that this commodification was acceptable so long as machi benefitted. Tensions within Mapuche communities over these commodifications often involved accusations and counter-accusations of witchcraft, as well as claims that machi who commodify the religion have been punished by their spirits.

== Demographics ==
By the close of the 20th century, there were around half a million Mapuche people. A 2001 survey of 352 Mapuche people from Chol-Chol and San Juan de la Costa found that 8 percent described themselves as followers of Mapuche traditional religion, while an additional 3.1 percent described following both traditional religion and Catholicism. The largest religion among Mapuche people surveyed was Catholicism, at 40.9 percent, followed by Evangelical Protestantism at 23.6 percent, and then Seventh-day Adventism, at 9.7 percent.

== Reception ==
Evangelical and Pentecostal Christian groups have often gone among Mapuche communities and denounced traditional religious practices as witchcraft and superstition, claiming that they involve interaction with demons.

== See also ==
- Chemamull
- Chilean mythology
- Chilote mythology
- Mapudungun
- Misión Jesuita Mapuche
- Indigenous religion
- Pillan
- Wallmapu
