= German folklore =

Expressive culture of Germany and German-speaking countries

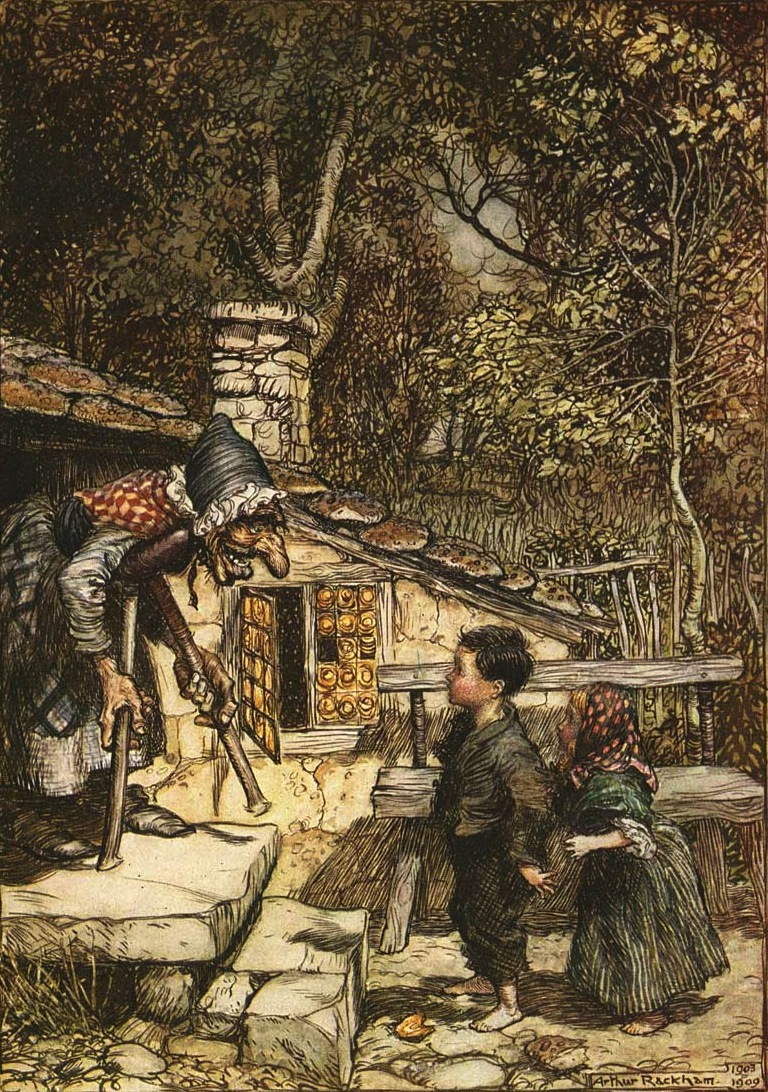
Illustration of Hansel and Gretel, a well-known German folktale from the Brothers Grimm, by Arthur Rackham, 1909

German folklore is the folk tradition which has developed in Germany over a number of centuries. Seeing as Germany was divided into numerous polities for most of its history, this term might both refer to the folklore of Germany proper and of all German-speaking countries, this wider definition including folklore of Austria and Liechtenstein as well as the German-speaking parts of Switzerland, Luxembourg, Belgium, and Italy.

== Characteristics ==
It shares many characteristics with Nordic folklore and English folklore due to their origins in a common Germanic mythology. It reflects a similar mix of influences: a pre-Christian pantheon and other beings equivalent to those of Norse mythology; magical characters (sometimes recognizably pre-Christian) associated with Christian festivals, and various regional 'character' stories.

As in Scandinavia, when belief in the old gods disappeared, remnants of the mythos persisted. There are:

- The banshee Klagmuhme
- Changelings
- The Doppelgänger, supernatural beings said to resemble the exactly similar appearance of determined person
- Dwarves such as the Fenixmännlein or the Ork, and their rulers like King Goldemar and King Laurin
- The elves and their ruler, the Erlking
- Field sprites like the Feldgeister
- Ghosts and undead such as Feuermann, Hemann, Nachzehrer, Uhaml, Will-o'-the-wisp, and Wiedergänger
- Household spirits such as the Kobold (with variants such as Bieresel, Gütel, Heinzelmännchen, Hinzelmann, Hödekin, Jack o' the bowl, Nis Puk, and Petermännchen), the Drak, and the Klabautermann found on ships
- Mountain spirits such as Rübezahl and mining sprites like the Bergmönch
- Nightmare-causing Alp, mare, and Drude
- Tormenting and frightening spirits such as Aufhocker, bogeyman, and poltergeist
- Water spirits like nixies, among them the Rhine siren Lorelei and the Rhinemaidens
- White female spirits such as the Weiße Frauen and Witte Wiwer
- The Wild Hunt with the wild huntsmen ewiger Jäger or Türst, wild huntswomen Frau Holle, Perchta or Devil's grandmother, and participants Treuer Eckart and Heimchen
- Wood sprites such as the Moss people and their matriarch Buschgroßmutter, the Fänggen, the Schrat, and the Wild man

There further are mythical animals such as Bahkauv, Beerwolf, Elwetritsch, Erdhenne, lindworm, Nachtkrapp, Rasselbock, Schießschlange, Tatzelwurm, and Wolpertinger, or mythical plants such as Alraune (mandrake) and Irrwurz.

Popular folklore includes Krampus, Belsnickel, and Knecht Ruprecht, a rough companion to Saint Nicholas; the Lutzelfrau, a Yule witch who must be appeased with small presents; the Christkind; the Osterhase (Easter Hare – the original Easter Bunny); and Walpurgisnacht, a spring festival derived from pagan customs.

Character folklore includes the stories of the Pied Piper of Hamelin, the Godfather Death, the trickster hero Till Eulenspiegel, the Town Musicians of Bremen and Faust.

== History ==
Documentation and preservation of folklore in the states that formally united as Germany in 1871 was initially fostered in the 18th and 19th centuries. As early as 1851, author Bernhard Baader published a collection of folklore research obtained by oral history, called Volkssagen aus dem Lande Baden und den angrenzenden Gegenden. The Saxon author Johann Karl August Musäus (1735–1787) was another early collector.

Study was further promoted by the Prussian poet and philosopher Johann Gottfried von Herder. His belief in the role of folklore in ethnic nationalism – a folklore of Germany as a nation rather than of disunited German-speaking peoples – inspired the Brothers Grimm, Goethe and others. For instance, folklore elements, such as the Rhine Maidens and the Grimms' The Story of a Boy Who Went Forth to Learn Fear, formed part of the source material for Richard Wagner's opera cycle Der Ring des Nibelungen.

Some of the works of Washington Irving – notably "Rip van Winkle" and "The Legend of Sleepy Hollow" – are based on German folktales.

Within Germany, the nationalistic aspect was further emphasized during the National Socialist era. James R. Dow has written that under National Socialism, "folklore became a propaganda instrument of anti-democratic, anti-socialist, and extremely inhumane terrorist policies". Folklore studies, Volkskunde, were co-opted as a political tool, to seek out traditional customs to support the idea of historical continuity with a Germanic culture. Antisemitic folklore such as the blood libel legend was also emphasized.

== See also ==
- Continental Germanic mythology
- German Legends
