= Hemann =

Shouting spirit from German folklore

The Hemann (German: [ˈheːˌman]), also Homann, Hoymann, Hoimann, or Jochhoimann, (Mann = man), is a spirit from German folklore known to scare people through yelling, usually invisibly and at night. The first part of its name usually depicts the kind of yell heard from the Hemann. It can be found in former German-speaking Bohemia (where the Czechs also know it as Hejkadlo), former German-speaking Silesia, Upper Palatinate, the Fichtel Mountains, the Vogtland, Westphalia, and around Crailsheim in Baden-Württemberg.

== Characteristics and identity ==
The Hemann yells "he he!" or "he helfts!" ("Hey help!") and chases the people with its yelling without ever reaching them completely. Only, it will "aufhocken" (leap upon a person's back and force them to carry the aufhocking spirit) if anybody dares to imitate its yells.

It is either a ghost, especially a Grenzfrevler (boundary sinner, i.e. someone who has moved a boundary stone or similar landmark with criminal intent, thus damning the soul to haunt the very boundary it unlawfully changed in life), or a field sprite who is offered the last sheaf of harvest. Occasionally, it also appears as domestic spirit.

The Hemann likely has its origin in the very real calls of the owl and eagle owl, the hoopoe, and the nightjar. Accordingly, in Silesia the owl is explicitly identified with the Hemann In Upper Palatinate, the same is true for the raven.

== Local variants ==
In Upper Palatinate, there is the Hoymann or Hoimann haunting the mountain forests besides the Hemann proper. Its shout, sounding like a coarse male voice or like an owl, can still be heard a quarter hour away. It shouts day and night but preferably in autumn and Advent season. Its appearance is that of a tall man in hunter's costume wearing a broad-brimmed hat or that of a giant (German Riese) reaching up to the clouds but usually it is rather heard than seen. Its identity is either an irredeemable poor soul of a deceased (German arme Seele) or the devil (German Teufel) himself. The Hoymann punishes the theft of wood from the forest and the imitation of its shout, the latter with "aufhocken", leading astray, or a slap in the face. The Hoimann also accompanies the Wild Hunt (German wildes Heer, literally "wild host"). The Hemann from Upper Palatinate wears a smock-frock.

In Lower Lusatia, the Homann yells every noon at stroke 12 p.m. and is thus used as a time indicator by the local people.

In Northern Bohemia, the Hehmann dwells in the cornfield and shrilly shouts "heh". Those who dare to answer with the same shout will experience "aufhocken". The Hehmann leaps on their neck.

In Switzerland, the Egelsee-Hüper who is invisibly haunting the lake Egelsee can be heard at midnight yelling "hüp hüp!".

In Westphalia, where the Hemann is known as Ropenkerl (shouting guy), his shout "hoho!" is an omen of bad weather. There further is the Heitmännchen (Männchen = manikin) shouting "heit heit!" or "ju ju!". It has the appearance of a little blue flame, will "aufhocken" if imitated but also helps with the harvest when offered a sandwich. Additionally, there is the Homännchen shouting from the midst of a cow herd, appearing for a short moment as a little manikin wearing a gray camisole before vanishing directly afterwards.

In the Lechrain, the Hojemännlein, Hojemännl, Hojemännel, or Hojemannl (sg., pl.; Männlein, Männl or Mannl = manikin) are little Kobolds, tiny and green of appearance, which are inhabiting forests and dilapidated farms where they dance on meadow patches without grass During Advent season they are yelling "hoje!", doing somersaults, and playing good-natured tricks. Their yelling sounds wistfully and like heart-rending weeping. Although born without marrow, they nonetheless can punish quite heavily those who dare to imitate their yells.

== Literature ==
- Beitl: Korndämonen. In: Hanns Bächtold-Stäubli, Eduard Hoffmann-Krayer: Handwörterbuch des Deutschen Aberglaubens: Band 5 Knoblauch-Matthias. Berlin 1933. (reprint: Walter de Gruyter, Berlin/New York 2000, ISBN 978-3-11-016860-0)
- Haberlandt: Messer. In: Hanns Bächtold-Stäubli, Eduard Hoffmann-Krayer: Handwörterbuch des Deutschen Aberglaubens: Band 6 Mauer-Pflugbrot. Berlin 1935. (reprint: Walter de Gruyter, Berlin/New York 2000, ISBN 978-3-11-016860-0)
- Heckscher: Gras. In: Hanns Bächtold-Stäubli, Eduard Hoffmann-Krayer: Handwörterbuch des Deutschen Aberglaubens: Band 3 Freen-Hexenschuss. Berlin 1931. (reprint: Walter de Gruyter, Berlin/New York 2000, ISBN 978-3-11-016860-0)
- Jungbauer: Hut. In: Hanns Bächtold-Stäubli, Eduard Hoffmann-Krayer: Handwörterbuch des Deutschen Aberglaubens: Band 4 Hieb- und stichfest-Knistern. Berlin 1932. (reprint: Walter de Gruyter, Berlin/New York 2000, ISBN 978-3-11-016860-0)
- Jungbauer: Rock. In: Hanns Bächtold-Stäubli, Eduard Hoffmann-Krayer: Handwörterbuch des Deutschen Aberglaubens: Band 7 Pflügen-Signatur. Berlin 1936. (reprint: Walter de Gruyter, Berlin/New York 2000, ISBN 978-3-11-016860-0)
- Ranke: Grenzfrevler. In: Hanns Bächtold-Stäubli, Eduard Hoffmann-Krayer: Handwörterbuch des Deutschen Aberglaubens: Band 3 Freen-Hexenschuss. Berlin 1931. (reprint: Walter de Gruyter, Berlin/New York 2000, ISBN 978-3-11-016860-0)
- Ranke: Hemann. In: Hanns Bächtold-Stäubli, Eduard Hoffmann-Krayer: Handwörterbuch des Deutschen Aberglaubens: Band 3 Freen-Hexenschuss. Berlin 1931. (reprint: Walter de Gruyter, Berlin/New York 2000, ISBN 978-3-11-016860-0)
- Ranke: Ruf, rufen. In: Hanns Bächtold-Stäubli, Eduard Hoffmann-Krayer: Handwörterbuch des Deutschen Aberglaubens: Band 7 Pflügen-Signatur. Berlin 1936. (reprint: Walter de Gruyter, Berlin/New York 2000, ISBN 978-3-11-016860-0)
- Seemann: jauchzen, juchzen und johlen. In: Hanns Bächtold-Stäubli, Eduard Hoffmann-Krayer: Handwörterbuch des Deutschen Aberglaubens: Band 4 Hieb- und stichfest-Knistern. Berlin 1932. (reprint: Walter de Gruyter, Berlin/New York 2000, ISBN 978-3-11-016860-0)
