= Gütel =

Domestic and mining sprite from German folklore

The Gütel (sg., pl.; German: [ˈɡyːtl̩]) is a variant of and synonym for the Kobold in German folklore. Originating in the Middle High German term gütel, güttel (= little god) signifying an idol, the name was later connected with the adjective gut = good.

The Gütel is first attested in 1507 as Güttgen, denoting a hunchbacked Kobold. Georgius Agricola mentions them as Saxon mining sprites in the Latinized form gutelos (acc. pl. masc.) based on which they entered Swiss literature as Guteli or Gueteli. Other early sources from the 16th or 17th century call them Gütelen or Güttichen.

Dialectal variants of the name Gütel are Gütchen, Gütgen, Güdgen, Güetel, Gietel, Gitel, Gidl, Gidle, Göthel, and Jütel (sg., pl.; alternate pl. Jüteln). Further corruption of its name and confusion with the word Jude = Jew made the Gütel a Jüdel, Jüdelchen, Jüdchen, Jüdgen (all diminutives of Jew), Jülchen or, through further derivation, Hebräerchen (diminutive of Hebräer = Hebrew) in Thuringia, Saxony, and Lower Lusatia. Another name from the Vogtland and the Ore Mountains is Heugütel (hay Gütel), in dialect variously given as Heigidl, Heigidle, Heigitel, Hagitel, and Haagitel.

== Identity, appearance and dwelling ==
The Gütel appear in the Vogtland and the Ore Mountains as domestic sprites or the souls or deceased children. The same is true for the Heugütel of the same regions which, despite appearing as a bearded old manikin inhabiting the hayloft (hence the name), really is the soul of a child who died unbaptized, though it can also appear colored black. For this reason newborn children have to be baptized soon so that they don't become Heugütel. Thus it is not surprising when the footprints left behind in ash by the Heugütel are like that of little children.

The Gütel or Gütchen also dwells inside the stove.

In Lower Lusatia, the Gütel are Erdmännlein (sg., pl.; earth manikins), i.e. dwarves. The same is said about the Jüdel.

In Halle (Saale) in Saxony-Anhalt, the newborn children are said to come from the Gütchenteich (Gütel pond) or the Gütchengrube (Gütel pit). The former relates the G.s to water sprites, as does the Gütgesbach (Gütel creek) near Bonn in North Rhine-Westphalia.

In Lusatia, the Jüdelchen are also behind the appearances of the will-o'-the-wisps (German Irrlichter).

== Activities ==
The Gütel usually is a good-natured, obliging, and child-friendly household spirit, while the rather malicious Jütel or Jüdel tends to torment domestic animals and children. The characteristics blend into each other, though. The connection between the Gütel and Jews is purely dialectal in its origin and by no means is the Jüdel any worse than many other legendary creatures, although a certain underlying historical anti-Semitic sentiment can be seen among the malicious tendencies.

The Heugütel is a swift little helper in house and stable. It particularly likes to cradle the children to sleep and dallies with the child in its sleep.

The Jüdel, Jütel or Gütgen teases the little children in their sleep making them restless, and it also causes them various diseases such as chills and ague, seizures, and measles. Seizures in particular are caused by the Gietel playing with the child. Women in childbirth are also in jeopardy.

Often it is already enough to distract the spirit with various amusements such as some bathing water left over placed on the stove inside a little pot for the Gütel to dabble with. Eggshells and playing cards hung on the crib or bow and arrows placed in the cellar and barn are also for the Gütel to play with.

It can be kept away, though, by greasing the stove door with a bacon rind or by lacing a straw from the bed of the woman in childbirth at every door. In Saxony, the Jüdel is driven away by a gift of new clothes. A gift of clothing also drives the usually half-naked benign Heugütel away, and with it also the blessing on the house. Furthermore, the Heugütel only stays in houses where the inhabitants are pious and live a Christian life.

If somebody has already fallen ill, or if at night a loud, heavy plunge was heard which, according to belief in the Ore Mountains, is an omen of impending death, then the Gütgen is offered animals as sacrifice which it kills instead. The offerings are as follows: a cock for a man, a sow for a woman, a goat for the person actually offering the animal, or hens for children.

At night, the Jütel or Jüdel enters the stable and plays with the cows until they growl and harasses the horses until they wildly bite and kick around. Jüdel and Güttichen also like to tangle the manes of horses and hair of women. The resulting Polish plait is thus called Jüdenzopf (Jew plait) or Güttichen Zopf (Gütel plait). From this activity of knotting hair together, in Upper Saxony the Gütel is also known as Haargütel in Standard German and Hoorgitel in dialect. Both terms mean "hair Gütel".

In Saxony, a Jütel, Jüdchen or Mützchen (little cap (wearer)) is attested once to practice "aufhocken" (leaping upon a person's back and forcing them to carry the aufhocking spirit), tormenting lonesome travelers until they are faint, out of breath, and ill due to that experience. This Hockelmännchen (aufhocking manikin) appears in the woods.

== Literature ==
- Bächtold-Stäubli: Krampf. In: Hanns Bächtold-Stäubli, Eduard Hoffmann-Krayer: Handwörterbuch des Deutschen Aberglaubens: Band 5 Knoblauch-Matthias. Berlin 1933. (reprint: Walter de Gruyter, Berlin/New York 2000, ISBN 978-3-11-016860-0)
- Burren: Gütel, Gütchen; Jütel, Jüdel. In: Hanns Bächtold-Stäubli, Eduard Hoffmann-Krayer: Handwörterbuch des Deutschen Aberglaubens: Band 3 Freen-Hexenschuss. Berlin 1931. (reprint: Walter de Gruyter, Berlin/New York 2000, ISBN 978-3-11-016860-0)
- Burren: Haargütel. In: Hanns Bächtold-Stäubli, Eduard Hoffmann-Krayer: Handwörterbuch des Deutschen Aberglaubens: Band 3 Freen-Hexenschuss. Berlin 1931. (reprint: Walter de Gruyter, Berlin/New York 2000, ISBN 978-3-11-016860-0)
- Burren: Heugütel. In: Hanns Bächtold-Stäubli, Eduard Hoffmann-Krayer: Handwörterbuch des Deutschen Aberglaubens: Band 3 Freen-Hexenschuss. Berlin 1931. (reprint: Walter de Gruyter, Berlin/New York 2000, ISBN 978-3-11-016860-0)
- Burren: Jüdel. In: Hanns Bächtold-Stäubli, Eduard Hoffmann-Krayer: Handwörterbuch des Deutschen Aberglaubens: Band 4 Hieb- und stichfest-Knistern. Berlin 1932. (reprint: Walter de Gruyter, Berlin/New York 2000, ISBN 978-3-11-016860-0)
- Jungbauer: Kleid. In: Hanns Bächtold-Stäubli, Eduard Hoffmann-Krayer: Handwörterbuch des Deutschen Aberglaubens: Band 4 Hieb- und stichfest-Knistern. Berlin 1932. (reprint: Walter de Gruyter, Berlin/New York 2000, ISBN 978-3-11-016860-0)
- Jungwirth: Kobold. In: Hanns Bächtold-Stäubli, Eduard Hoffmann-Krayer: Handwörterbuch des Deutschen Aberglaubens: Band 5 Knoblauch-Matthias. Berlin 1933. (reprint: Walter de Gruyter, Berlin/New York 2000, ISBN 978-3-11-016860-0)
- Mengis: schwarz. In: Hanns Bächtold-Stäubli, Eduard Hoffmann-Krayer: Handwörterbuch des Deutschen Aberglaubens: Band 7 Pflügen-Signatur. Berlin 1936. (reprint: Walter de Gruyter, Berlin/New York 2000, ISBN 978-3-11-016860-0)
- Ranke: Irrlicht. In: Hanns Bächtold-Stäubli, Eduard Hoffmann-Krayer: Handwörterbuch des Deutschen Aberglaubens: Band 4 Hieb- und stichfest-Knistern. Berlin 1932. (reprint: Walter de Gruyter, Berlin/New York 2000, ISBN 978-3-11-016860-0)
- von Geramb: Ofen. In: Hanns Bächtold-Stäubli, Eduard Hoffmann-Krayer: Handwörterbuch des Deutschen Aberglaubens: Band 6 Mauer-Pflugbrot. Berlin 1935. (reprint: Walter de Gruyter, Berlin/New York 2000, ISBN 978-3-11-016860-0)
