= Household deity =

Deity or spirit associated with the home

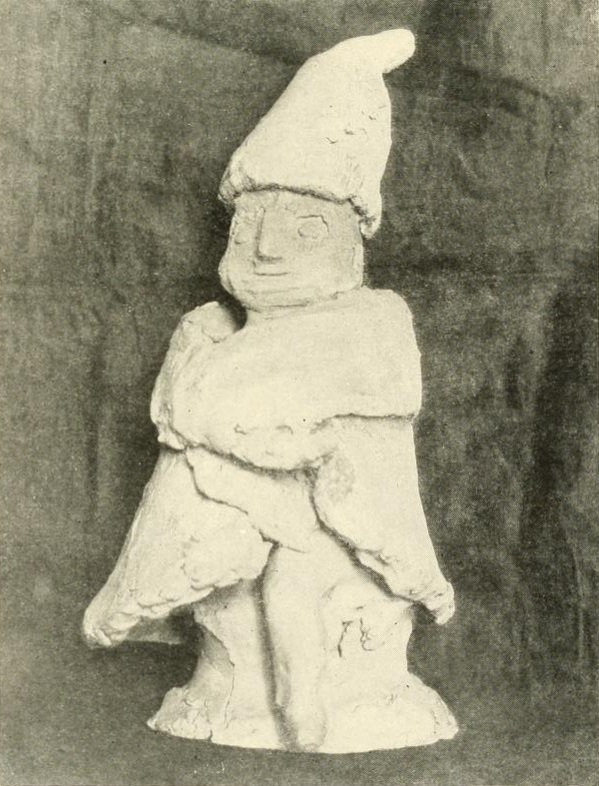
Early-20th-century Slavic cult image of a Domovoy, the household deity, progenitor of the kin, in the Slavic religion

A household deity is a deity or spirit that protects the home, looking after the entire household or certain key members. It has been a common belief in animistic religions and folklore across many parts of the world.

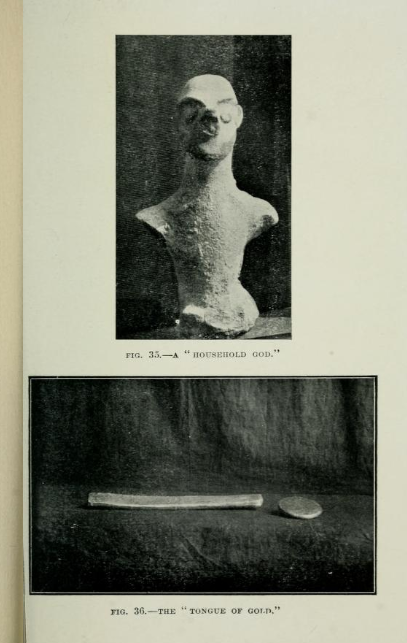
"Household god" in Gezer by R A Stewart Macalister

Household deities were usually worshiped in the home, where they would be represented by small idols (such as the teraphim in the Bible), amulets, paintings, or reliefs. They could also be found on domestic objects, such as cosmetic articles in the case of Tawaret. The more prosperous houses might have a small shrine to the household gods, for example the lararium in ancient Rome. The gods would be treated as members of the family and invited to join in meals or be given offerings of food and drink.

== Types ==
Household deities fit into two types. The first type was a specific deity – typically a goddess – often referred to as a hearth goddess or domestic goddess associated with the home and hearth, such as the ancient Greek goddess Hestia.

The second type of household deity is an animistic deity, which usually has lesser powers than major deities. This type was common in the religions of antiquity, such as the lares of ancient Roman religion, the gashin of Korean shamanism, and cofgodas of Anglo-Saxon paganism. These survived Christianisation as fairy-like creatures existing in folklore, such as the Anglo-Scottish brownie and Slavic domovoy.

== Household deities in the modern period ==
Many European cultures retained house spirits into the modern period. Some examples of these include:

- Brownie (Scotland and England) or Hob (England) / Kobold (Germany) / Duende y Trasgu (Spain and Portugal) / Goblin / Hobgoblin
- Domovoy (Slavic)
- Nisse (Norwegian or Danish) / Tomte (Swedish) / Tonttu (Finnish)
- Húsvættir (Norse)

Although the cosmic status of household deities was not as lofty as that of the Twelve Olympians or the Aesir, they still had to be appeased with shrines and offerings. Because of their immediacy, household deities had arguably more influence on the day-to-day affairs of men than the major pagan gods did. The influence of household deities persisted long after Christianity and other major religions reduced the worship of the major pagan pantheons. Elements of household deity worship can be seen even today, with Christian accretions, where statues to various saints (such as St. Francis) protect gardens and grottos. Even the gargoyles found on older churches could be viewed as guardians partitioning a sacred space.

For centuries, Christianity fought a mop-up war against these lingering minor pagan deities, but they proved tenacious. For example, Martin Luther's Tischreden have numerous references to dealing with kobolds. Rationalism and the Industrial Revolution threatened to erase most of these minor deities, until the advent of romantic nationalism rehabilitated and embellished them into objects of literary curiosity in the 19th century. Since the 20th century, this literature has been mined for characters in role-playing games, video games, and other fantasy personae, sometimes given invented traits and hierarchies differing from their mythological and folkloric roots.

== Origins in animism and ancestor worship ==
=== Shinto as an exemplar of development ===
The general dynamics of the origin and development of household deities over a considerable span may be traced to the Shinto belief system in Japan. As Japanologist Lafcadio Hearn claimed:

The real religion of Japan, the religion still professed in one form or other, by the entire nation, is that cult which has been the foundation of all civilized religion, and of all civilized society, – Ancestor-worship.

Three stages of ancestor-worship are to be distinguished in the general course of religious and social evolution; and each of these finds illustration in the history of Japanese society. The first stage is that which exists before the establishment of a settled civilization, when there is yet no national ruler, and when the unit of society is the great patriarchal family, with its elders or war-chiefs for lords. Under these conditions, the spirits of the family-ancestors only are worshipped;—each family propitiating its own dead, and recognizing no other form of worship. As the patriarchal families, later on, become grouped into tribal clans, there grows up the custom of tribal sacrifice to the spirits of the clan-rulers;—this cult being superadded to the family-cult, and marking the second stage of ancestor-worship. Finally, with the union of all the clans or tribes under one supreme head, there is developed the custom of propitiating the spirits of national, rulers. This third form of the cult becomes the obligatory religion of the country; but it does not replace either of the preceding cults: the three continue to exist together.

Whenever a child is born in Japan, a local Shinto shrine adds the child's name to a list kept at the shrine and declares him or her a "family child" (氏子 ujiko). After death an ujiko becomes a "family spirit", or "family kami" (氏神 ujigami).

Many Japanese houses still have a shrine (kamidana, kami shelf) where offerings are made to ancestral kami, as well as to other kami.

=== Cultural evolution and survival ===
Edward Burnett Tylor, one of the main founders of the discipline of cultural anthropology, spoke of survivals, vestiges of earlier evolutionary stages in a culture's development. He also coined the term animism. Tylor disagreed with Herbert Spencer, another founder of anthropology, as well as of sociology, about the innateness of the human tendency towards animistic explanations, but both agreed that ancestor worship was the root of religion and that domestic deities were survivals from such an early stage.

==== Animism and totemism ====
In contradistinction to both Herbert Spencer and Edward Burnett Tylor, who defended theories of animistic origins of ancestor worship, Émile Durkheim saw its genesis in totemism. This distinction is somewhat academic since totemism may be regarded as a particularized manifestation of animism, and a synthesis of the two positions was attempted by Sigmund Freud. In Freud's Totem and Taboo, both totem and taboo are outward expressions or manifestations of the same psychological tendency, a concept which is complementary to, or which rather reconciles, the apparent conflict. Freud preferred to emphasize the psychoanalytic implications of the reification of metaphysical forces but with particular emphasis on its familial nature. This emphasis underscores, rather than weakens, the ancestral component.

=== Domestic deities and ancestor worship ===
==== Jacob Grimm (1835) ====
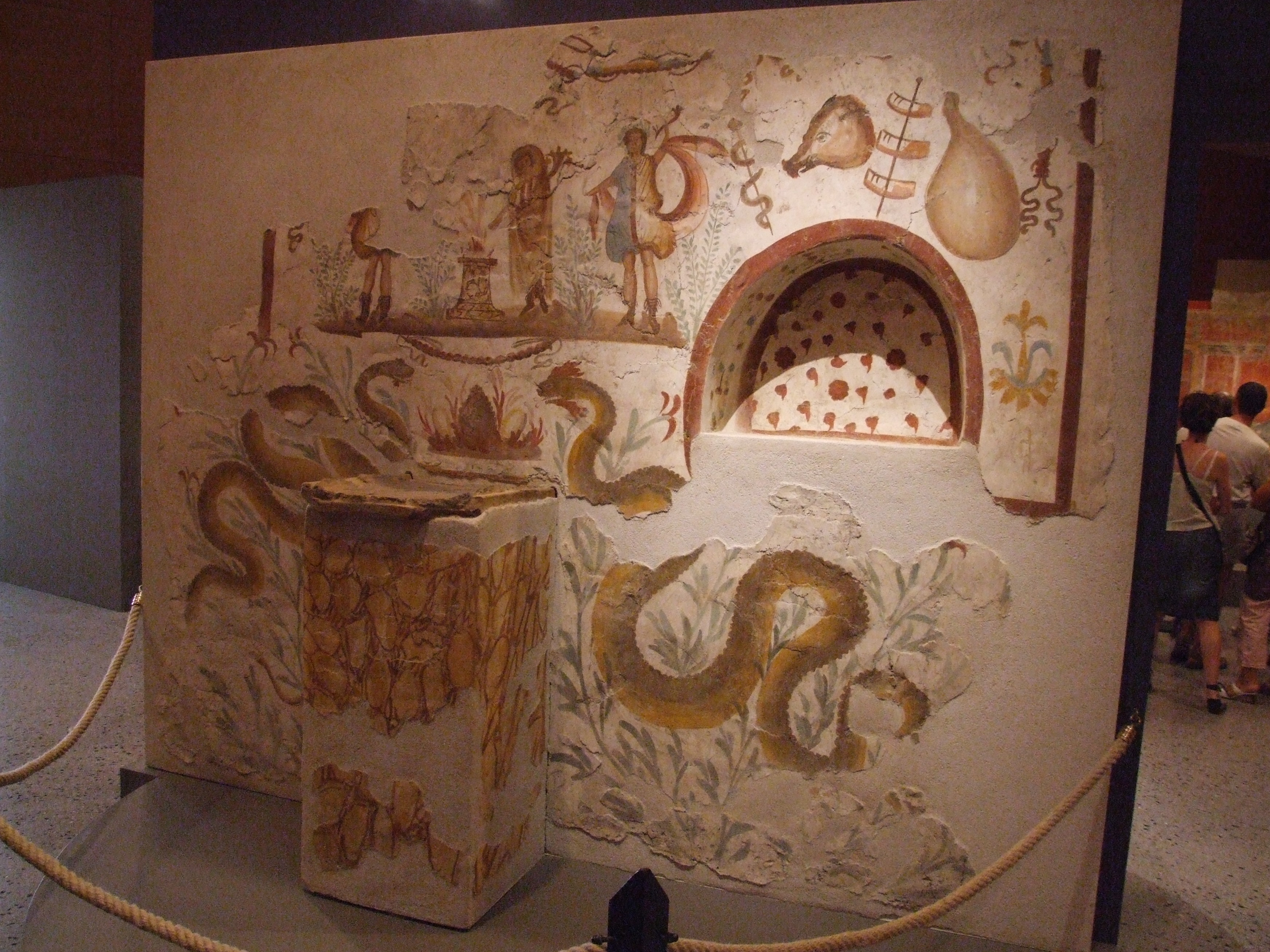
Shrine of the household deities lares in Pompeii, showing the offering altar and a niche for votive images

European folklorist Jacob Grimm did not hesitate to equate the Roman lar familiaris to the brownie. He explains in some detail in his Deutsche Mythologie:

Larva betrays its affinity to lar ..., and the good kindly lares were often held to be manes or souls of departed ancestors. So in our German superstition we find instances of souls becoming homesprites or kobolds, and still oftener is there a connexion between unquiet spirits and spectres.

==== Thomas Keightley (1870) ====
To underscore the equivalence of brownie, kobold, and goblin, consider the words of the English historian and folklorist Thomas Keightley:

The Kobold is exactly the same being as the Danish Nis, and Scottish Brownie, and English Hobgoblin. [b] He performs the very same services for the family to whom he attaches himself. ... The Nis, Kobold, or Goblin, appears in Scotland under the name of Brownie.

==== MacMichael (1907) ====
MacMichael elaborated his views on the folkloric belief complex as follows:

What are our elves and fairies, goblins, nisses, brownies, and pixies but latter-day survivals of arkite ancestor worship? Brownies and pixies were probably invariably of good character, originally, a likelihood suggested by the good points which in many respects survive in their character, their virtues being turned into vices, and, contrariwise, their vices into virtues, as good or ill fortune befell the household and its appurtenances. Is not the bowl of milk placed for the Brownie in the corner of the room a survival of the drink-offering of wine which was poured out before the household gods of the Romans?

==== New International Encyclopaedia ====
Demonstrating that this evolution and functional equivalence has generally come to be accepted and that their nature is indeed that proposed by Grimm, one may refer to the early twentieth century New International Encyclopaedia:

The term fairy, however, is also loosely used to include other beings of a similar character like the brownie, elf, fay, gnome, goblin, kobold, pixy, puck, salamander, sprite, sylph, troll and undine. ... Fairy lore contains likewise certain elements of ancestor-worship, of mythology, and of older religious beliefs.

and also

The resemblance to the Robin Goodfellow (q.v.) of the English and the Kobold of the Germans is conspicuous, and the Roman Lar is also suggested by this suspicion.

=== Origin of ancestor worship in animism ===
==== Hearn (1878) ====
William Edward Hearn, a noted classicist and jurist, traced the origin of domestic deities from the earliest stages as an expression of animism, a belief system thought to have existed also in the Neolithic and the forerunner of Indo-European religion. In his analysis of the Indo-European household, in Chapter II, "The House Spirit", Section 1, he states:

The belief which guided the conduct of our forefathers was ... the spirit rule of dead ancestors.

In Section 2, he proceeds to elaborate:

It is thus certain that the worship of deceased ancestors is a vera causa, and not a mere hypothesis. ...

In the other European nations, the Slavs, the Teutons, and the Kelts, the House Spirit appears with no less distinctness. ... [T]he existence of that worship does not admit of doubt. ... The House Spirits had a multitude of other names which it is needless here to enumerate, but all of which are more or less expressive of their friendly relations with man. ... In [England] ... [h]e is the Brownie. ... In Scotland this same Brownie is well known. He is usually described as attached to particular families, with whom he has been known to reside for centuries, threshing the corn, cleaning the house, and performing similar household tasks. His favorite gratification was milk and honey.

==== George Henderson (1911) ====
George Henderson elaborated on the presumed origin of ancestor worship in animism:

The second phase of this stage of thought [Animism] would be a cult of human ancestors, specially of tribal chiefs and clan-heroes: this is Manism or Ancestor Worship proper, culminating in hero worship. ... it is to be noted that the characteristics pertaining to a particular clan or tribal community, which mark ancestor worship, will have fallen very much to the background if they can be at all inferred among the Celts; the relations emphasised will be found pertaining to mythologic concepts and to the Nature-Myth. For, as modifications and transitions in behalf are constant, ancestor worship gets partly transcended. But in Manism the guardian spirit has its specific influence on the tribal consciousness. I recollect Aoibhell of Craig Liath, the guardian spirit of the Dal Caiss, mentioned in the narrative concerning Brian Boru in the Wars of the Gaedhel and the Gall; there is also Mag Molach or Hairy Hand, and Bodach An Duin of Rothiemurchus, as well as the more familiar belief in the Brownie which renders offices of help in some houses,—a feeble survival of early phases of cult.

== List ==
Domestic or hearth goddesses from various mythologies include:

=== African ===
- Bes, a god in Ancient Egyptian religion
- Ekwu, a god in Igbo Odinani

=== European ===
- Agathodaemon in Ancient Greek religion
- Aitvaras in Lithuanian mythology
- Berehynia (originally a river spirit, since 1991, has become a hearth goddess in Ukrainian Romantic nationalism)
- Bieresel in German folklore
- Brighid, a goddess in Ancient Celtic religion
- Brownie or Urisk in Scottish folklore
- Bwbachod in Welsh folklore
- Cofgodas in Anglo-Saxon paganism
- Domovoy in Slavic religion
- Drak in German folklore
- Erdhenne in German folklore
- Frigg, a goddess in Old Norse religion
- Gabija, a goddess in Baltic religion
- Haltija, or Haldjas in the Baltic Finnish religion, Finnish folklore, and Estonian mythology.
- Heinzelmännchen, Heimchen, and Fenixmännlein in German folklore
- Hestia, a goddess in the Ancient Greek religion
- Hob, Lubber fiend, and Puck in English folklore
- Húsvættir, Norse
- Jack o' the bowl in Swiss folklore
- Kabouter in Dutch folklore
- Kikimora in the Slavic religion
- Klabautermann, a household sprite in German folklore found on ships instead of houses
- Kobold (including Gütel, Hinzelmann, Hödekin and Petermännchen) in German folklore
- Lares in Ancient Roman religion
- Lutin in French folklore
- Matka Gabia, a goddess in the Slavic religion
- Monaciello, Monachiccio, Mamucca, Lu Laùru, Aguriellu, or Mazapegol in Italian folklore
- Moss people, wood sprites in German folklore that also appear as domestic sprites
- Nis Puk in Danish, Frisian, and German folklore
- Penates, in Ancient Roman religion
- Safa, in Ossetian mythology
- Schrat in German and Ashkenazi Jewish folklore
- Tomte, or Nisse in Scandinavian folklore
- Trasgu in Spanish folklore and Portuguese folklore
- Vesta, a goddess of Traditional Roman religion, both state and domestic

=== West Asian ===
- Ev iyesi in Turkic mythology
- Ḫašamili, god of smithing and the household in Hittite, Hattian, and Palaic mythology
- I Gudli Saibia, a female guardian angel in Romani mythology
- Kamrušepa or Kataḫzipuri, goddess of healing, the hearth and family life in Hittite, Luwian, Hattian, and Palaic mythology
- Lamassu, house guardians in Mesopotamian mythology
- Zilipuri, god of the house and the hearth in Hittite and Hattian mythology

=== East Asian ===
- Anito in prehispanic Filipino culture.
- All gashin, the most prominent being Teoju, Seongju, Jowang, or Samshin in Korean folk religion
- Imoinu (Emoinu), a household hearth goddess in Meitei mythology and Sanamahism of Manipur
- Kamui Fuchi, a goddess in the Ainu folklore in Japan
- Leimarel Sidabi, a household mother goddess in Meitei mythology and Sanamahism of Manipur
- Menshen, divine guardians of doors and gates in Chinese folk religion
- Ông Táo, kitchen god in Vietnamese folk religion
- Ông Địa, is the god of the earth and patron of the land on which the houses are built in Vietnamese folk religion
- Sanamahi, the most predominant god in Meitei mythology and Sanamahism of Manipur
- Tu Di Gong (earth deity), in Chinese folk religion
- Yumjao Leima (Yumjao Lairembi), a household mother goddess in Meitei mythology and Sanamahism of Manipur
- Zao Jun (kitchen god), in Chinese folk religion
- Zashiki-warashi, in Japanese folklore

=== North American ===
- Chantico, a goddess in Aztec mythology

== See also ==
- Ancestral shrine and Ancestral tablets
- Chinese ancestral worship
- Dharmapala
- Kitchen God
- Teraphim

== Bibliography ==
- Freud, Sigmund. Totem und Tabu: Einige Übereinstimmungen im Seelenleben der Wilden und der Neurotiker. 1913. (English translation Totem and Taboo: Resemblances Between the Mental Lives of Savages and Neurotics, 1918.) Third essay, "Animism, Magic and the Omnipotence of Thought".
- Grimm, Jacob. Deutsche Mythologie (Teutonic Mythology). Göttingen, 1835, 3rd ed., 1854, 2 vols. English translation available online at http://www.northvegr.org/lore/grimmst/017_12.php
- Grimm, Jacob, and Wilhelm Grimm. Deutsches Wörterbuch (German Dictionary). Available online in German at http://germazope.uni-trier.de/Projects/DWB.
- Hearn, William Edward. 1878. London: Longman, Green & Co. The Aryan Household, Its Structure and Its Development: An Introduction to Comparative Jurisprudence. "Chapter II: The House Spirit". Available online at https://books.google.com/books?name=9663WttGfbUC&pg=PA39.
- Hearn, Lafcadio. Japan, an Attempt at Interpretation. The Macmillan Company, New York, 1904. Available online at
- Henderson, George. "The Finding of the Soul", in Survivals in Belief Among the Celts, I.2. [1911]. Available online at Survivals in Belief Among the Celts: I. The Finding of the Soul (part 2).
- Heine, Heinrich. Zur Geschichte der Religion und Philosophie in Deutschland ("Concerning the History of Religion and Philosophy in Germany".) Available online at.
- Keightley, Thomas. The Fairy Mythology: Illustrative of the Romance and Superstition of Various Countries. 1870. Available online at The Fairy Mythology: Germany: Kobolds.
- MacMichael, J. Holden. "The Evil Eye and the Solar Emblem", in The Antiquary, XLIII, Jan-Dec 1907, p 426. Edward Walford et al., eds. London: 1907. ... Available online at Google Books.
- The New International Encyclopaedia, Coit et al., eds. Dodd, Mead & Co., 1911. Available online at Japan, An Attempt at Interpretation Index.
