= Feuermann (ghost) =

Fiery ghost from German folklore

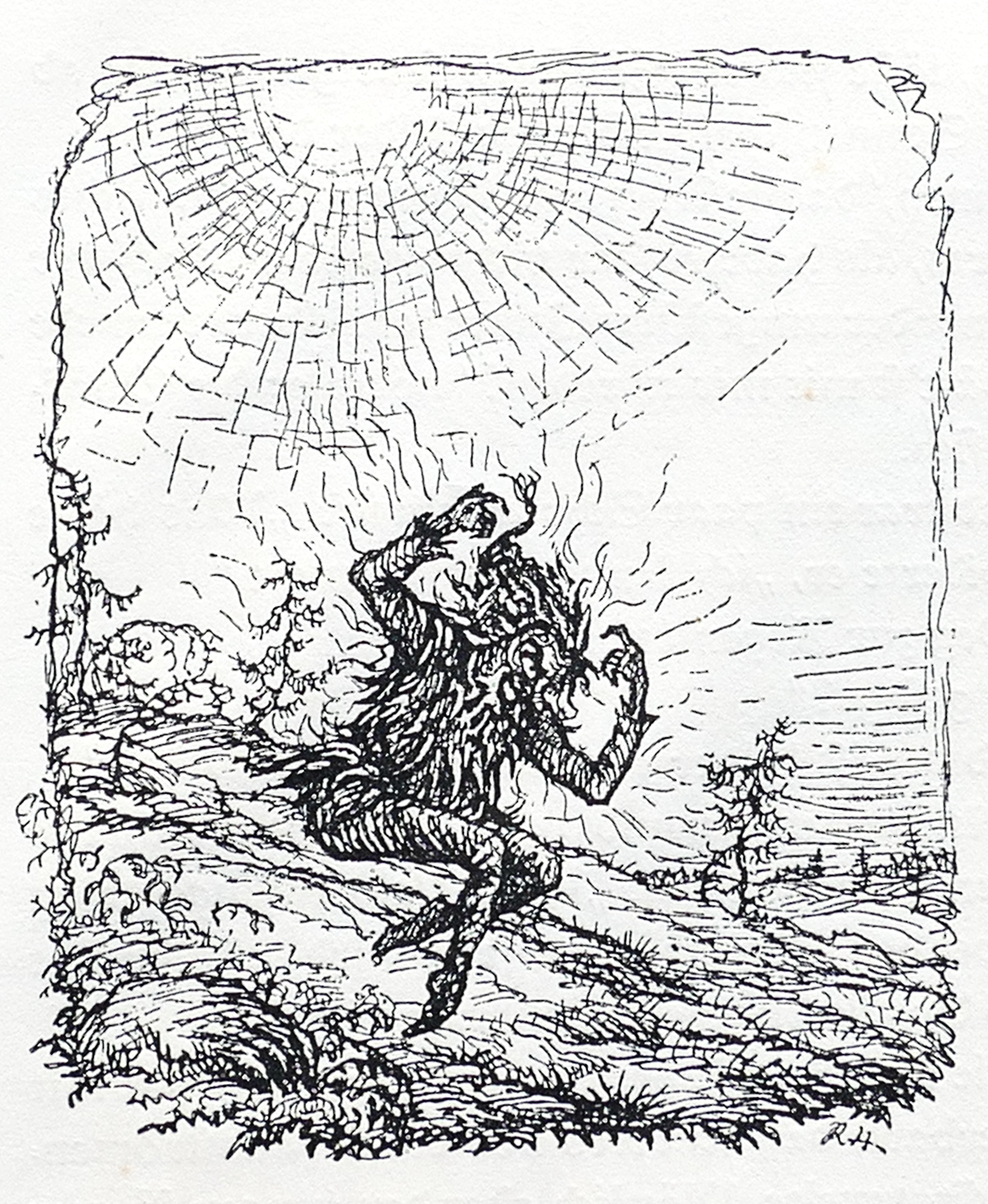
Illustration of a Feuermann

The Feuermann (fire man; German: [ˈfɔɪ̯ɐˌman]; pl. Feuermänner), also Brennender, Brünnling, Brünnlinger, Brünnlig (all: burning one), brünnigs Mannli (burning manikin), Züsler (sg., pl.; flickering one or arsonist), and Glühender (glowing one), is a fiery ghost from German folklore, which is different from the will-o'-the-wisp (German Irrlicht) owing to its size: Feuermänner are rather big, while Irrlichter are rather small. An often recurring term for Feuermänner is glühende Männer (pl.; glowing men; die glühenden Männer; in dialect gloinige Männer, glöhnege Männer, glöänige Männer or jlönige Männer).

== Appearance ==
The appearance of the Feuermann varies across accounts. Some are described as rather humanoid, such as a human skeleton whose insides are blazing with fire, or as a leaden manikin wearing a leaden mantle blazing with fire underneath. Another description is of a black man inside a tall, wide pillar of fire, or a Feuermann who is half black, half fiery. It is able to change its height at will, varying from gigantic to diminutive. Variously occurring features are long scrawny legs, a missing head (if not carried under the arm), and a hollow back. In other cases the Feuermann appears as a black or invisible man with a single or two fiery eyes who is either carrying a light or lantern or smoking a pipe which sprays fiery sparks. Rarer appearances are that of a fiery, sometimes headless rider on a fiery horse and that of a fiery ploughman with fiery horse and plough.

Alternatively, the Feuermann also appears more or less shapeless like a (sometimes gigantic) sheaf or bundle of straw, a big floating light, a fiery ball, a pyramid, a snake, or a fiery wheel. The Feuermann is very quick and able to rise in the air so that it hovers above the treetops. If the Feuermann shakes itself or collides with others of its kind, then it will spray sparks.

== Identity ==
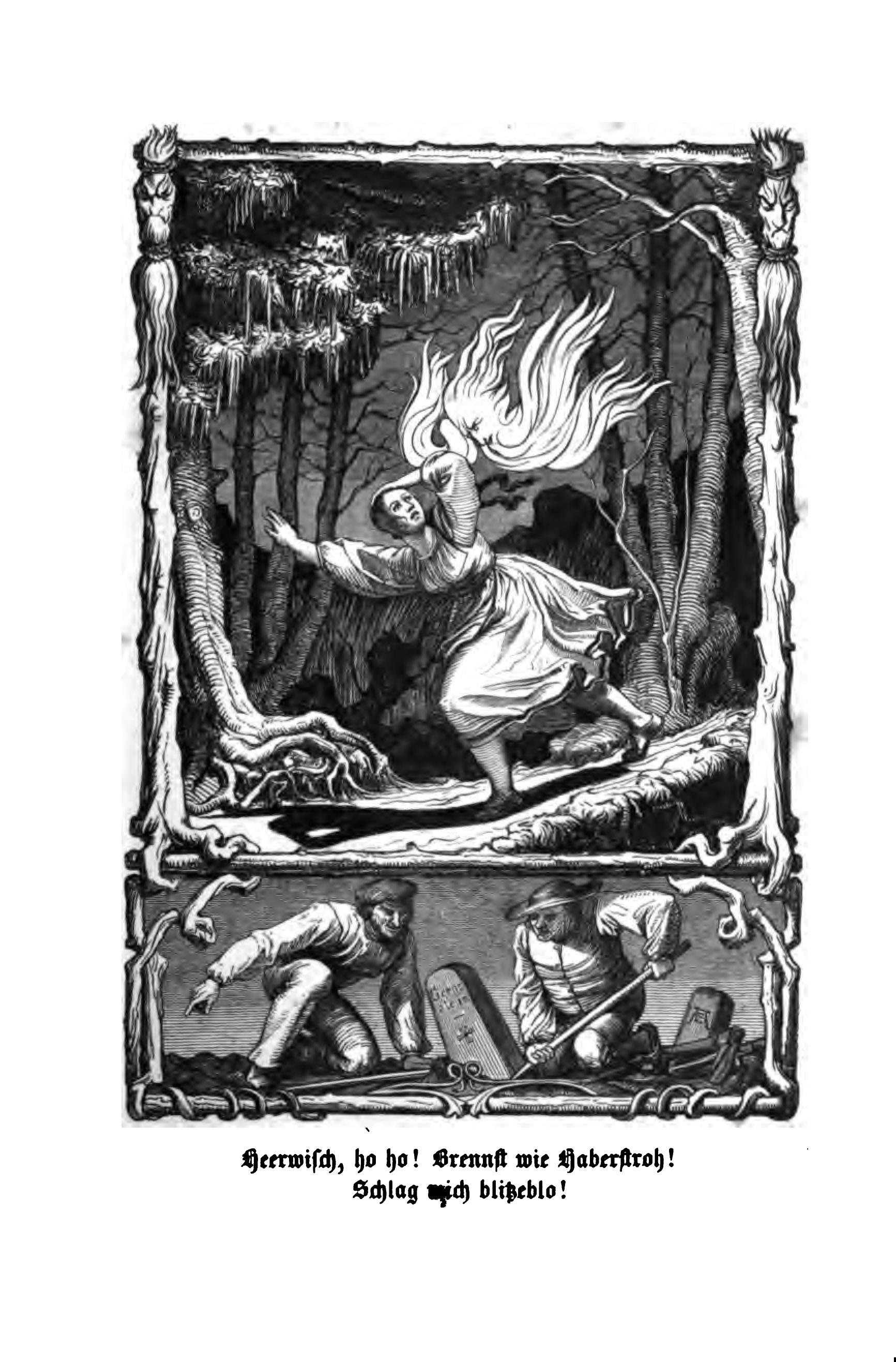
Illustration of a Feuermann (here: Heerwisch) haunting for illegally moving a boundary stone. The girl is mocking, "Heerwisch, ho ho! Burning like oat straw! Beat me black and blue!"

It is seen as a sinner remaining hauntingly on earth to repent for its sins during lifetime. Frequently, the Feuermann is a so-called Grenzfrevler (sg., pl.) or boundary sinner who has moved a boundary stone or similar landmark with criminal intent, thus damning the soul to haunt the very boundary it unlawfully changed in life. Other possible identities of the Feuermann include a sacristan who has stolen money from the collection bag, a murderous incendiary, a traitor of his country, and several other kinds of evildoers. Grenzfrevler, suicide victims, double murderers and unrepentant executed evildoers can appear as fiery spheres.

== Haunting times and haunting spots ==
The Feuermann appears only at evening or at night, preferably at fields, particularly field borders, and meadows, especially swampy ones. Its appearance in settlements is an omen of impending firestorm. In Silesia, the Feuermann or Feuermändel (fire manikin) is a nursery bogey sitting in the cornfield. The feuriger Fischer. (fiery fisherman; der feurige Fischer) haunts Lake Constance and is known to walk around on the water surface of the whole lake taunting the living fishermen.

== Interaction with the living ==
Usually harmless, the Feuermann can also appear helpful to humans by showing and illuminating them the way at night for a small sum of money or a word of gratitude such as "Vergelt's Gott" ("May God reward it") or "Bezahl dir's Gott (soviel Mal wie du's nötig hast)" ("May God repay you (as many times as you need)"). Such a blessing redeems the burning sinner, as do prayers and masses because of which Feuermänner draw near upon hearing a prayer. Swearing drives them away instead. During the way home, when illuminated by a Feuermann, one shouldn't speak, though, and enter the house facing backwards. If invited to eat some onion and bacon flans after illumination service, the spirit will follow the invitation and eat up the flans.

The Feuermann also burns away the cobwebs in the houses without the houses catching fire, allows humans to light their pipes with its fire, and is thankful to be given ribbons to burn since during the span of time the ribbon is burnt it is freed from the infernal pains it always has to suffer from as a soul in purgatory. The Feuermann comes willingly if called.

A malicious Feuermann can be experienced when it has helped out a human and is refused the promised reward or when it takes revenge on a human who has played a prank on it. Then, the Feuermann leads astray, practices "aufhocken" (i.e., leaping upon a person's back and forcing them to carry the aufhocking spirit; particularly experienced by people whistling at the Feuermann), gives a slap in the face, or follows the person and sets the straw on their wagon or even their house ablaze. It is dangerous to touch the Feuermann's hand. Thus, one should always give an object instead of one's hand as one will find a black handprint burnt on it where the Feuermann has touched. The Feuermann further shoots glowing balls at passersby after midnight.

== Literature ==
- Beitl: Korndämonen. In: Hanns Bächtold-Stäubli, Eduard Hoffmann-Krayer: Handwörterbuch des Deutschen Aberglaubens: Band 5 Knoblauch-Matthias. Berlin 1933. (reprint: Walter de Gruyter, Berlin/New York 2000, ISBN 978-3-11-016860-0)
- Eckstein: Kuchen. In: Hanns Bächtold-Stäubli, Eduard Hoffmann-Krayer: Handwörterbuch des Deutschen Aberglaubens: Band 5 Knoblauch-Matthias. Berlin 1933. (reprint: Walter de Gruyter, Berlin/New York 2000, ISBN 978-3-11-016860-0)
- Freudenthal: glühend. In: Hanns Bächtold-Stäubli, Eduard Hoffmann-Krayer: Handwörterbuch des Deutschen Aberglaubens: Band 3 Freen-Hexenschuss. Berlin 1931. (reprint: Walter de Gruyter, Berlin/New York 2000, ISBN 978-3-11-016860-0)
- Freudenthal: Kugel. In: Hanns Bächtold-Stäubli, Eduard Hoffmann-Krayer: Handwörterbuch des Deutschen Aberglaubens: Band 5 Knoblauch-Matthias. Berlin 1933. (reprint: Walter de Gruyter, Berlin/New York 2000, ISBN 978-3-11-016860-0)
- Jungwirth: Fischer, fischen. In: Hanns Bächtold-Stäubli, Eduard Hoffmann-Krayer: Handwörterbuch des Deutschen Aberglaubens: Band 2 C.M.B.-Frautragen. Berlin 1930. (reprint: Walter de Gruyter, Berlin/New York 2000, ISBN 978-3-11-016860-0)
- Jungwirth: Schweigen. In: Hanns Bächtold-Stäubli, Eduard Hoffmann-Krayer: Handwörterbuch des Deutschen Aberglaubens: Band 7 Pflügen-Signatur. Berlin 1936. (reprint: Walter de Gruyter, Berlin/New York 2000, ISBN 978-3-11-016860-0)
- Ranke: Feuermann. In: Hanns Bächtold-Stäubli, Eduard Hoffmann-Krayer: Handwörterbuch des Deutschen Aberglaubens: Band 2 C.M.B.-Frautragen. Berlin 1930. (reprint: Walter de Gruyter, Berlin/New York 2000, ISBN 978-3-11-016860-0)
- Ranke: Grenzfrevler. In: Hanns Bächtold-Stäubli, Eduard Hoffmann-Krayer: Handwörterbuch des Deutschen Aberglaubens: Band 3 Freen-Hexenschuss. Berlin 1931. (reprint: Walter de Gruyter, Berlin/New York 2000, ISBN 978-3-11-016860-0)
- Ranke: Irrlicht. In: Hanns Bächtold-Stäubli, Eduard Hoffmann-Krayer: Handwörterbuch des Deutschen Aberglaubens: Band 4 Hieb- und stichfest-Knistern. Berlin 1932. (reprint: Walter de Gruyter, Berlin/New York 2000, ISBN 978-3-11-016860-0)
- Schewe: blau. In: Hanns Bächtold-Stäubli, Eduard Hoffmann-Krayer: Handwörterbuch des Deutschen Aberglaubens: Band 1 Aal-Butzemann. Berlin 1927. (reprint: Walter de Gruyter, Berlin/New York 2000, ISBN 978-3-11-016860-0)
- Seemann: Pfeife, pfeifen, Flöte, flöten. In: Hanns Bächtold-Stäubli, Eduard Hoffmann-Krayer: Handwörterbuch des Deutschen Aberglaubens: Band 6 Mauer-Pflugbrot. Berlin 1935. (reprint: Walter de Gruyter, Berlin/New York 2000, ISBN 978-3-11-016860-0)
