= Drak (mythology) =

Infernal familiar and domestic sprite from German folklore

The Drak (German: [dʁaːk]), Drâk, Dråk, Drakel (Note: Kuhn (1859) "43 De Bastor to Achelriën", place near Osnabrügge (Westphalian for Osnabrück), cited by Mackensen (1930) at n245. Kuhn's original source is a Dr. Schwerdtmann, the tale printed in a 1850 Osnabrück journal.) or Fürdrak (either "for-Drak" or "fire Drak"), in Oldenburg also Drake (f.), is a household spirit from German folklore often identified with the Kobold or the devil (German Teufel), both of which are also used as synonymous terms for Drak. Otherwise it is also known as Drache (dragon) but has nothing much to do with the reptilian monster in general.

== Nomenclature ==
The etymology of drak, it has been argued, does not descend directly from Latin draco (German: Drachen, Middle High German: trachen) for "dragon", but rather from the name mandragora (which is sometimes misconceived of as relating to the dragon, as in the English name "man-drake"). (Note: This is reiterated in Frick (1982), though the HdA citation is only for the devil's or witch's toad (Kröte) being discussed.) (Note: The form Drakel as well descending from mandragore/mandrake.)

The Drak (Drache) is known under various other names. Some names given to the Drak hint at its elfish or Kobold descent, such as Alf, Alber, Alp, Kolbuck, Koberchen, Pûks, and Erdhühnlein (earth chicken). Names based on clothing are typical for both Drak and Kobold, e.g. Hauslätzchen ("house bib"), Rôdjackte or Rodjackte ("the one with the red jacket"). (Note: Cf. Jackerl ("the one with the jacket"; noa name for devil).)

In Westphalia, there is popular belief that the Drak (feurige Drache) is manifested in meteors, thus the creature is also called Herbrand (Note: Sartori actually gives Hêrbrand (var. Hjärbram, Hjäwenbrand.)) (Herbrand, lit. 'war flame', denoting fireball or shooting star (Note: Grimm, Deutsche Worterbuch, s.v. "Heerbrand" apud Plassmann)). It is called Schlingsteert ("coiling tail"), Langwams ("long doublet"), and Kortwämsken ("little short doublet", these three occur in Minden, Westphalia), and Langschwanz ("long tail", in Bückeburg, Lower Saxony, 10km east of Minden).

The creature is also known in the Alpine region by such "cute" names as Tragerl (Austria), Stutzli (diminutive of Stutz, a Swiss franc coin), Geldhühndl, but calling it drak has become current in Switzerland, apparently due to adoption of the Low German form: this local house kobold exhibits an overlap with the Alpine "field dragons" (tatzelwurm, etc.), (Note: The tatzelwurm or stollenwurm was associated with blood-sucking and milk-suckling. The drak was also said to suck the milk from cows. Devil's or witch's toad (subject to comparison with drak by Frick) was also said to suck milk from cows.) as well as conflation with the lucky Alraun (Note: Note Alrun/Alrune( [sic]) are given as alias of kobold of "dragon" type in the article on "Kobold" in HdA.) (lit. 'mandrake') And Tragerl has been discussed rather as a subtype of mandrake doll/imp (Alraun, aka Galgenmännlein) or kobold. While the name Tragerl (also used in Austria) has been folklorically connected to the sprite's penchant to carry (tragen) goods or riches to its owner, the similarity of this name to Trache (var. German for "dragon") is also noted.

Yet other names are rather proper names like they are also given to the Kobold or even the devil, such as Mårten (Martin), Mertche (diminutive of Martin), Lütche Ohle ("little old one"; a devil name), Steppchen, Stepke, Steppken or Steffchen (devil names; cf. § Steppchen below), Hänschen ("Johnnie", diminutive of Johann. Cf. § Wendish drache below), and Federhänschen (Note: citing Witzschel as n240.) ("feather-Johnnie", another devil name).

A 2020 reference provides a "Kobold" map, indicating that Drak is a common alias for kobold particularly around northeastern Germany. The same reference also has a further map giving the breakdown on what aliases of Drak within various states inside Germany. It shows that in Saxony, Drak, Drache, Gelddrache (lit. 'money dragon') are used. Drak (Note: Or Draken, apparently plural form.) as well as the equivalents Glûbolt (Note: Or Glûbolte apparently plural form.) and Glûschwanz, Glûschwän (Note: Or Glûswänze apparently plural form.) occur in Lower Saxony (cf. § Glûbolt below).

Drache and Draak are used in the state of Brandenburg, while Plon occurs on the eastern edge of Brandenburg. Plon is actually distinctive of Lusatia (Slavic-speaking area spanning Germany, Czech, and Poland), (Note: Plon could also be referred to as "der Drack" or "der Drock" by the Wendish population in Lusatian Heiligensee.) and in fact, plon is a Lower Sorbian term applied to a household spirit (a house-dragon), to be distinguished from a usual monster-dragon (cf. § Zmij and plon below).

== Physical description ==
The physical appearance of the Drak is very variable. Although humanoid (small manikin) shape is attested, sometimes wearing a red cap and red jacket, the Drak predominantly takes the shape of an animal. Especially frequently mentioned is its occurrence in the guise of a cat or kitten, which may be black or brown-black, or even be a so-called Teufelskatze (devil cat). It is also said to appear as a black chicken (cock or hen) or a wet one (cf. § Chicken forms). Such a Drachenhuhn (dragon chicken) is sometimes capable of laying Taler (thaler) or silver eggs, in the latter case two per day. Other attested bird shapes, besides bird in general, are the partridge, a gray hawk, an owl, and a jackdaw.

The Drak might also appear as a (pied) calf (cf. § Wendish drache belwo) a (three-legged or fiery) hare, a wingless red snake, or a black ant. The Drak might take the shape of an animal by day and that of a Kobold by night, or it appears as a chicken inside the house and in fiery appearance outside of it.

Various fiery appearances are also typical for the Drak when it flies out at night. A shooting star, meteor, will-o'-the-wisp (German: Irrlicht) or lightning flash might thus very well be the Drak. The fiery appearance of the Drak is too variable to describe exhaustingly, thus only a few examples shall suffice. It might appear as a fire column or fire pillar, as various objects with a fiery tail (a broom, a glowing ball, a star), as a fiery red lump, a firelight, a fiery grain sack, and quite frequently as a fiery hay pole (with a broad head, a big head like a stove pot, or surrounded by blue firelight). Other appearances are more like animals, such as a fiery snake, cat, or chicken, a being with a big fiery head and a long black-blue tail, and a being with a big dog head and a glowing snake tail. Where the Drak is flying everything burns down. Because of that it is regarded as an omen of firestorm. The Drak might also burn down its owner's house if it feels mistreated. Names associated with the Drak's fiery and tailed appearance are Herbrand ("shooting star"), Langschwanz ("long tail"), Kortschwanz (short tail), Schlingsteert ("entwining tail"), Gluhswanz, Gluhstert or Glüsteert (all: glowing tail), and Salamander. It further is accompanied by infernal sulfur stench.

The Plon is said to have seven heads (Note: Cf. the Russian zmei's multiheadedness.) according to the lore of Lusatian Heiligensee (i.e., Poświętne village in Osiecznica).

== Owning a Drak ==
To win a Drak as one's domestic spirit a deal with the devil signed with one's own blood is necessary, thus the owners are often said to be witches (German: Hexen, sg. Hexe) or freemasons (German: Freimaurer (sg., pl.)). What makes owning a Drak so desirable despite the price of one's soul is the fact that the Drak brings its owner whatever they might covet by stealing it from the neighbors. A Drak's owner is not allowed to pray or to go to church for communion. The Drak will take every third owner back to hell.

There are several types of Drak.

The Drache may act in the capacity of a Gelddrache, a bringer of money, gold and treasures to the owner. Lutz Mackensen notes the lore is represented both among Germans and Slavs, i.e., the Gelddrache of Upper Lusatia is called Upper Sorbian: peńežny zmij in the language of Sorbian Slavs (Note: Meiche and Grimm here cited by Mackensen.) which has been rendered as "penny-dragon" (cf. § Zmij and Plon below).

The Drache might also show where wealth is hidden. In accordance to both activity and appearance other names for the Drak are Geldhühndel (money chicken), Tragerl (carrier), and Stutzli (money). The money it brings can be spent but will return to the owner without fail. Owning a Drak can be bound to owning a specific Taler which will always return to its owner if not sold lower than its value. Otherwise it can only be inherited or given away as part of a dowry. Occasionally, such a Feuerpûz (fire bogey) might also be enclosed in a glass bottle. Owning a Drak makes the process of dying very difficult its owner. Placing the dying person on the dunghill (Note: Mackensen cites MdBl-fVk 3 on woman in Rauda near Eisenberg.) or placing dung under the dying person's pillow is the only way to ease dying for a Drak owner. (Note: Mackensen and Geiger citing Meiche (1903) "404. Der Drache in dem Weitzdorfer Gute" (Weitzdorf near Hohnstein, Saxony), p. 309. and others.) But even then the Drak might still scratch its owner's face. (Note: Mackensen cites MdBl-fVk 3 of a dragon owner who was a farmer in Dünnschütz (obscure location, somewhere in eastern Thuringia accord. to article title).)

People who die a sudden death are suspected of being Drak owner. And people who get rich too quickly also raise talks (gossips) about being a Drak owner. The Drak brings its money load through the chimney or the skylight. Sometimes this load also can be horse dung turning into gold afterwards. The Drak carrying gold or money appears distinctly colored (black, glowingly red, half red or half blue, or dazzlingly yellow) or blue when carrying money, and flies particularly low when carrying such a load. For this job the Drak expects to be well fed with millet porridge, though, to be placed on the stove the Drak dwells inside. If the feeding ceases, the Drak can't fulfill a task or its lair is discovered, then the Drak will escape never to return again. When the gruel is burnt, then the Drak rages in the stove so that it seems it would soon explode.

Another is the Getreidedrache, Korndrache or Weizendrache (crop dragon, grain dragon, and wheat dragon respectively) which is also known as Roggenkatze (rye cat). This kind of Drak accordingly brings its owner loads of cereals. When doing so its color is blue, gray, black, or variously colorful. The Drak usually transports grain in an eggshell or a nutshell. Sometimes it carries so much that it has to throw away a part of its load during its flight. The Drak often appears as a wet or freezing chicken at the wayside. If someone takes it home for it to warm at the fireplace, it will bring cereals to show its gratitude.

The third type is the Butterdrache (butter dragon), Milchdrache (milk dragon) or Quarkdrache (quark dragon). Accordingly, this Drak brings its owner milk or dairy goods, among them cheese and quark but never the good one. The milk might look like cherry stones, though. It might even bring all ingredients needed to bake a cake, e.g. cream, butter, and raisins. It sucks other people's cows dry so that they only give blood instead of milk. In the shape of a squirrel it sits on a cow when the cattle get milked. Stealing butter is rather difficult for the Drak, as it needs to visit a hundred villages to gather a spoonful of butter. The same can also be true for milk, for it will take one "Nödel" (measurement? spoon?) of milk per house in a hundred villages. The Drak brings other goods too, such as wood lugs turning into smoked beef, sausages (accordingly it is called Wurstdrache or sausage dragon), bread, flour and eggs, linen, dung, and frogs which can be used to make chicken soup. It only readily unloads its gifts if there is nobody else looking, though, and also guards its owner's goods. Hence, it will disappear if eavesdropped on. The Wurstdrache is offered milk containing chunks of bread roll for its services.

In the guise of a black dog, the Drak vomits dumplings. The Drak can also vomit milk. As a black cat, it defecates knöpfle, a type of Southern German noodle dish. Only that the knöpfle are cat dirt in reality. The toad-shaped Knöpflekröte (knöpfle toad), too, poops knöpfle. The Drak is milked through a thread.

There is further differentiation between a guter Drache (good dragon) and a armer Drache (poor dragon). The former enters the chimney as a fireball and pours out milk, eggs, and money. The latter appears as a long hay pole, enters through the window's pendentive and leaves behind a gruesome stench.

== Driving the Drak away ==
Other people can drive the Drak away or force it to part with its load by swearing (e.g. "Schwinsdreck!" = "pig dirt!"), calling it by its name, calling at it through a wheel hub, or shouting commandos such as "Halbpart!" ("half part!") "Schütte, schütte!" ("Pour out, pour out!"), "Losch loh!" ("Let go!" in Silesian dialect = "Lass los!" in Standard German). Reciting the rhyme "Es fährt kein Fuhrmann über Land und Brück', Er lässet seinen Zoll zurück!" ("No teamster drives overland and over bridges, He leaves behind his toll!") has the same effect, as has showing one's naked behind, and shooting or throwing at the Drak, best with inherited silver, iron, or steel. Yet another method is pulling off a wheel from a wagon and putting it back on inverted. But one shouldn't stand directly beneath the Drak and flee under a roof as otherwise it will throw down a load of lice or filth, or sulfur stench which will never go away. A yellow sulfuric smelling substance left behind by the Drak is called Drachenschmalz (dragon lard) or Drachengspei (dragon spit). This is the load the Drak had to drop because it flew over manure or tan, thought to be yellow, pungent milk. Otherwise it might also enter the house of its owner, setting it on fire and burning itself to death.

Wendish/Sorbian folklore on ridding the household spirit is discussed under § Zmij and Plon.

== Subtypes ==
As already discussed, the Drak or Drache (also called fliegende Drache, lit. 'flying dragon') is a subtype of the broad category of household kobolds, conflated with the notion of servant devils. (Note: Another generic broad category (under which fliegende Drak falls is) Korndämon "corn demon", employed by Mannhardt.)

=== Chicken forms ===
The Drak/fliegende Drache often takes on the guise of black or red rooster or hen, as already touched upon.

==== blauer Gickel ====
The blauer Gickel (lit. 'blue rooster') is a Hessian variant of Drak or subtype of the fowl-formed fliegende Drache. In an oral tale set in Gelnhaar (district in Ortenberg, Hesse) a certain assessor's wife served peculiar tasting food, and the servants spied on the ongoings to determine that the food was procured food from a devil, entering the house through the chimney. Though they knew they could trap and seal the devil inside by inscribing "The Blood of Jesus Christ" upon four lumps of dough, they all just resigned from service.

=== Steppchen ===
Steppchen (probably shortened form of Stephanchen, "little Stephen") is a form in Northern Thuringia. Also known as Hauslätzchen (<Latz "bib") in the region. A tale speaks of a woman of Mauderode who brought a Heckethaler ("multiplying dollar" cf. Hecktaler below) which brought her family wealth until her child playing with it lost it.

A certain Hofmeister (overseer of a farm) in Berga after supervising a team plowing summoned his Steppchen at lunchtime, which brought him food, and urged his workers to share the meal, but they were too frightened to do so. Another tale tells of a miller in Immenrode (in Werther, Thuringia) who hired boys to help him accomplish the ritual of ridding his Steppchen, which consisted of beating a sack containing seven flint stones at a boulder on the crossroad in the forest.

The cognate group of diminutive devil names are much more widely distributed, thus Stöpke or stöpke in der helle in Lower Saxony (in Low Saxon); stebchen, stäbchen on the Main steppche; steppche in thieves' slang; stebgen, stöpgen in Upper Saxon; stöpfel in Thuringian; and steubel in Baden, denoting particularly a fiery dragon that brings back money or grain to the household, as discussed by according to Jacob Grimm.

== Drak by regional variant ==
=== Drakel near Osnabrück ===
The Drakel spewed out gold for a Pastor of Achelrien near Osnabrück, Lower Saxony, according to legend.

=== Feuriger Drache ===
The usage of the form feuriger Drache[n] (lit. 'fiery dragon') spans the state of Hesse into northwestern parts of neighboring Bavaria (Franconia)

Whereas the feuriger Drache is known as Federhanschen around Arnstadt, Thuringia.

=== Glûbolt ===
Glûbolt has been registered as a prominent variant of Drak within Saxony. (Note: Blocklettered as "GLÛBOLT" within Saxony on the 2020 map.)

In Lower Saxony, the witches are said to employ Glûbolt (var. Glûschwanz (Note: Or in the dialect spelt rather as Glûswänz (singular of Glûswänze given.)) to bring money, but the Glûbolt unrewarded with milk will set fire to the house.

=== Wendish Drak ===
==== Zmij and Plon ====
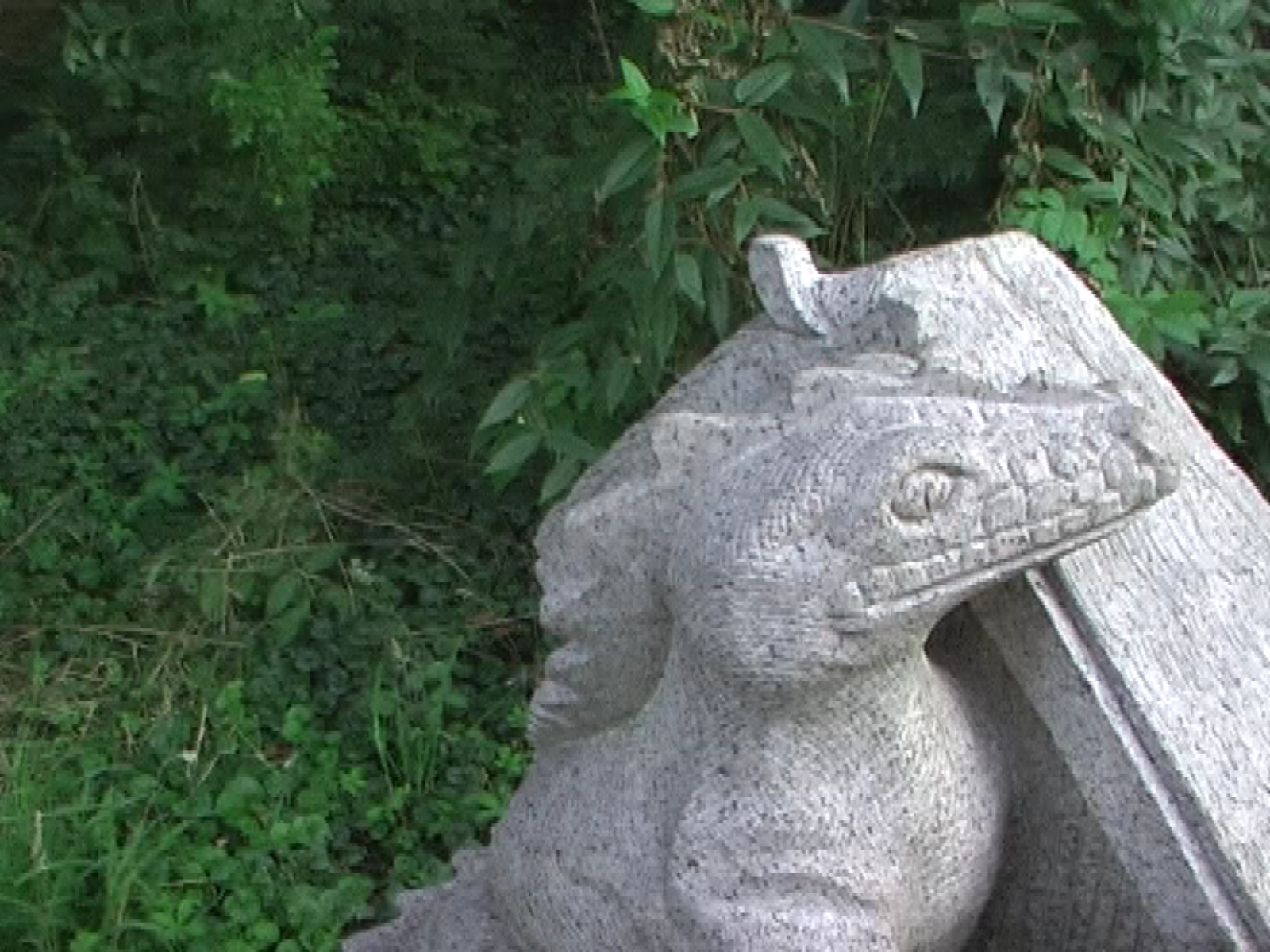
The Plon, Sorbian equivalent of the Drak

The term for the household spirit dragon (drak) in Wendish/Upper Sorbian is zmij, and it equivalent in Lower Wendish/Lower Sorbian is plon. These beings are to be distinguished from an ordinary "dragon". (Note: In Sorbian, paliwaka is the term for the usual dragon or lindworm.) The term zmij is cognate to Russian zmei ("serpent, dragon") while plon carries the base meaning of "wealth" or "abundant yield", and cognate to a creature known as plívník to the Czechs.

The spirit brings wealth to the household where it resides, dwelling in a spot behind the stove, called "Hell". It makes transit through the chimney flue, and carries goods through it, be it hard cash, grain, milk, or quark (curd), stolen from elsewhere. Accordingly there are subtypes of the creature: the money zmij (Upper Sorbian: peńežny zmij), grain zmij (žitny zmij), and milk zmij (mlókowy zmij), or the quark zmij, and even a "shitty" zmij. (Note: Given as "beschissenen zmij" by Nedo. Cf. § Wendish drache) The money zmij has a red tail, while the grain zmij is blue-tailed. The money zmij can be acquired by finding a special penny (called Heckpfennig by the Germans). The grain zmij can be gotten by bringing home a wet chicken. It demands to be compensated with millet porridge with milk (or meat), (Note: Plon said to require millet porridge thickened with syrup and sugar (in Lusatian Heiligensee),) and if not properly fed will wreak havoc.

In one version from Upper Lusatia, the creature inveigles itself to be adopted by letting the prospective owner find a coin, at first a Dreier (3 Pfennig piece), then a 6 Pfennig piece, and so on, doubling until the sum is a whole Speziestaler('silver dollar').

Ridding the zmij may be challenging, though supposedly accomplishable by restoring the chicken or coin back to where it was found, or selling the magic coin (Hecktaler, meaning "breeding/multiplying dollar") for less than par value. (Note: Similarly explained by Mackensen on "Drache", citing Grimm and others.) It is more easily accomplished if only a short time has elapsed since taking the creature in. If unsuccessful at ridding oneself of the zmij, horrific death may be the dire consequences.

The zmij can be eliminated using a commonplace motif trick of assigning the imp the impossible task of filling a boot without a sole with money (this trick is mentioned in other folklore concerning a devil). However, the owner risks reprisal by the zmij which may set fire to the house or cause other damages. In one tale, a Plon could not accomplishing the chore of bringing enough money to fill a bottomless stocking, was starved without the food reward, and departed, but as consequence, all the farmer's money turned to manure except the sums he had loaned.

==== Wendish drache ====
In one Wendish folklore anecdote (from around Schlossberg by Burg (Spreewald), Brandenburg), a certain woman was free to work the field later than other housewives since she was spared the chore of cooking the meal, for she had a Drache in the attic, and with her chant beckoning its name Hänseken (i.e. Hänschen), and urging it to "vomit" (Note: "Küllexe man nur Hänseken külexe}", where standard German verb is kolxen for "to vomit".), it would disgorge a whole meal into a large bowl. A revulsed maidservant refused being served food that the "spotted calf" belched out, and as a consequence, the Drache perched on the bacon-hanging bar in the chimney and shat on the maid, and the stain would not come off. Hence if anyone is looking black and blue, it is customary to tauntingly ask the person if a Drache had shat on it.

== In art ==
In January 2025 in Bautzen, a sort of float or windsock version of the Sorbian zmij, measuring 12 meters long, has been crafted by stitching together patches of colorful cloth, and placed on public installment to hang between buildings. Conceived of by the city's Cultural Office, and executed by Chilean artists Muriel Cornejo und César Olhagaray.
