= Ork (folklore) =

Mountain demon of Tyrol folklore

The ork is a demon of Tyrol Alpine folklore.

== Folklore ==
The ork lives on mountains, almen, rock holes, or valleys. He warns the noble game of hunters. He is a feared monster like the aufhocker. Another type of ork, of dwarf-like appearance, is similar to a well-behaved kobold/house spirit in wine cellars.

A particular kind of ork is the Orco Burlevole (Tricky Ork), very popular in the area of Verona. This tall, horse-hoofed and horse-haired man, who lives in caves or abandoned houses, can assume any form, produce any sound and even alter the victim's perception of place or time. Despite his great power, his only goal is to play jokes on the victims and, when he has had his fun, he disappears in a sulphur cloud saying "Te l'ho fatta!" meaning, in the local language, "I fooled you" or “I got you”.

== Origins ==
Like the French ogre, the word Ork may be derived from the Etruscan god Orcus. Similarly named creatures called Orco or Uerco appear in Italian folklore, later evolving into the ogre of fairy tales. The Ork of Tyrolean folklore may share a similar etymology.

The Ork may also be connected to the figure Orkise in the medieval poem Virginal, about Dietrich von Bern's battle with a similar being.

== See also ==
- Orc, a similarly named creature in the fantasy fiction of J.R.R. Tolkien.
