= Cofgod =

Household god in Anglo-Saxon paganism

'Cofgod' (plural Cofgodas ("cove-gods")) was an Old English term for a household god in Anglo-Saxon paganism.

The classicist Ken Dowden opined that the cofgodas were the equivalent of the Penates found in Ancient Rome. Dowden also compared them to the Kobold of later continental folklore, arguing that they had both originated from the kofewalt, a spirit that had power over a room. If it is true that such beings were known to the early English, later legendary beings such as the English hob and Anglo-Celtic brownie would be the modern survival of the cofgod. However, the only instance of the word cofgodas in Old English is as a gloss (an explanatory definition) to the Latin word penates.

== See also ==
- Wights, Germanic equivalent
- Landvættir, Norse and Icelandic equivalent
- Rå, later Scandinavian equivalent
