= Bergmönch =

Mining spirit from German folklore

Bergmönch by Karl Reinecke-Altenau

The Bergmönch ("mountain monk"; German: [ˈbɛʁkˌmœnç]) is a mountain spirit from German folklore. He is also known as Meister Hämmerling ("master hammering guy").

The appearance of the Bergmönch is like a giant in size. He has white hair and fiery looking eyes as large as dining plates. The mountain spirit wears a black hooded cowl as used by monks; this gave rise to his name Bergmönch. He also can be dressed like a miner. As such he is called Meister Hämmerling. Additionally, he can take the shape of a horse with long neck and terrible looking eyes, and is also able to become invisible.

The residence of the Bergmönch are pits and mines in the mountains. There he is active as well deep in the pits as up on the surface. Especially on Fridays this mountain spirit is very busy. He fills the excavated ores from one bucket to another. The Bergmönch should be given his head because he will violate anyone who dares to scold his futile effort. The mountain spirit generally is an erratic and dangerous being. His breath is poisonous, able to kill twelve people at once. Also, he sometimes grasps a miner and puts him down at another place with so much strength that the miner's limbs are shattered. The mountain spirit loves hoaxing and is known as a very hot-tempered person. He doesn't like being denied or joked about and will surely punish those who deny him.

The Bergmönch can also be just and helpful, guarding the good miners and punishing the evil ones. He punishes vices such as whistling and cursing, egoism, infidelity and idleness. For example, the mountain spirit killed an evil foreman of miners by crushing his head invisibly with his knees. The Bergmönch sometimes gives miners whose mining lamps are in danger of going out some of the oil from his giant pit lamp. This oil never diminishes and burns steadily even for years when the miner never reveals the secret that he got lamp oil from the Bergmönch. He also has favorite miners whose work he does, excavating ores for them. This spirit is able to excavate more ores in one hour than miners are able to excavate in one week. He also shows his favourite miners hidden lodes of gold and silver but the miner has to throw some of his mining tools in the offered lode or it will be closed to never being seen by human eyes again.

== Similar beings ==
Many other mountain spirits appear in German folklore. The most frequently appearing mountain spirits are the dwarves, which are most commonly called Zwerge (sg. Zwerg) but are also known under a wide range of other names such as Bergmännchen (sg., pl.; "mountain manikins") or Erdkobolde ("earth Kobolds"; sg. Erdkobold). They are said to often appear in droves. A malevolent mountain spirit of Swabian salt pits is the long-nosed Halgeist or Haalgeist (both "salt ghost") which throws everyone over the mountain who dares to make fun of its large nose.

== See also ==
- Rübezahl – a Czech-German mountain spirit or woodwose

== Literature ==
- Wilhelm Grimm, Jacob Grimm: Deutsche Sagen: Vollständige Ausgabe mit Illustrationen von Otto Ubbellohde. Kassel 1818, reprint at Nikol, Hamburg 2014, ISBN 978-3-86820-245-8.
- Ludwig Bechstein: Deutsches Sagenbuch. Meiningen 1852, reprint at F. W. Hendel Verlag, Meersburg, Leipzig 1930.
- Christa Agnes Tuczay: Geister, Dämonen - Phantasmen: Eine Kulturgeschichte. Marix Verlag, Wiesbaden 2015, ISBN 978-3-7374-0972-8.
