= Bernhard Baader =

Collector of German folklore

Bernhard Baader was a collector of German folklore in the former Baden, now part of Baden-Württemberg.

== Biography ==
Baader completed his education in 1819 at the Wilhelmsgymnasium in Munich. From 1830 to 1840 he published (as several other authors) texts from German folklore in various newspapers. Parts of his stories were taken by August Schnezler and published in his book Badisches Sagenbuch in 1846.

In 1851, Baader published his 20 years of folklore gathering in his book Volkssagen aus dem Lande Baden und den angrenzenden Gegenden. He stated that all the stories in his book were from oral history. In 1859 he published a sequel with more folklore.

== Works ==
- Volkssagen aus dem Lande Baden und den angrenzenden Gegenden (German)
- Neugesammelte Volkssagen aus dem Lande Baden und den angrenzenden Gegenden (German)
