= Uhaml =

Legendary creature or ghost from German folklore

The Uhaml (German: das Uhaml with neuter article; German: [ˈuːˌhaml̩]) is a spirit from German folktales. It was known among the former Germans of Bohemia and Silesia, now part of the Czech Republic and Poland respectively, particularly in the former Iglau language island of Bohemia. The Uhaml is an airy sprite, a ghost, or possibly some kind of demonic bird. Nothing is known about its appearance other than it having horse feet.

At night, the Uhaml's call can be heard from the air: "Uhuhu!" People mocking it by imitating its call will be chased by the Uhaml until they are safe from it under the eaves. In the forest, "she" (for the Uhaml is apparently imagined as female in this case only) might also aufhocken, i.e. leap on a passerby's back and let itself be carried, jumping down from "her" victim only upon reaching the forest border.

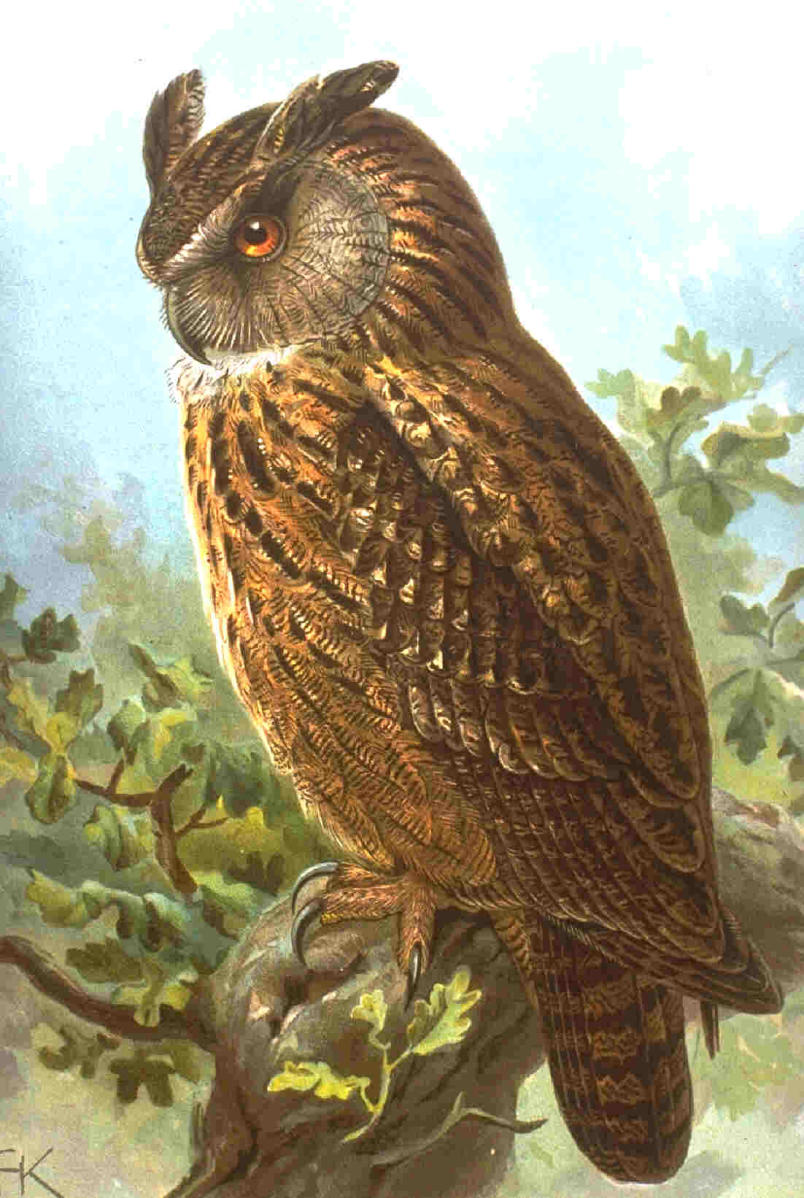
The Uhaml and other legendary creatures might be based on the Eurasian eagle-owl.

To ward off the Uhaml's evildoing, three chips of wood and a loaf of bread will be placed in the parlor. The Uhaml will enter the parlor, cut the bread in two halves and take one of them with it.

The name Uhaml can be explained as a Silesian dialectal form of Standard German "unheimlich", meaning "eerie" or "uncanny", or can more likely be connected to the Eurasian eagle-owl, called "Uhu" in German with regard to its call.

== Similar creatures ==
In German folklore, there are also other legendary creatures showing similarities with the Uhaml.

In Lower Austria, there is the Udl, a demonic kind of bird dwelling in the woods covering the slopes of the castle mountain (Schlossberg) in Mödling. Its hoarse, raucous call can be heard relentlessly at night. The call of the Udl is a true omen for war or other disasters. Nobody is able to drive this bird away for it will always return to its forest. Like the Uhaml, the Udl is thought to be connected to the Eurasian eagle-owl.

In the Steigerwald in Franconia, there is a stone cross on the path from Ebrach to Michelau. There, the Uhumännle is haunting, a ghost known for its habit of shouting "uhu". The Uhumännle (Männle being the diminutive of Mann = man) might appear as a large raven. Those who mock it by imitating its "uhu" will get slapped by an invisible hand.

== Literature ==
- Will-Erich Peuckert: Schlesische Sagen. Munich 1924. (reprint: Eugen Diederichs Verlag, Munich 1993, ISBN 3-424-00986-5)
- Will-Erich Peuckert: Uhaml. In: Hanns Bächtold-Stäubli, Eduard Hoffmann-Krayer: Handwörterbuch des Deutschen Aberglaubens: Band 9 Waage-Zypresse, Nachträge. Berlin 1941. (reprint: Walter de Gruyter, Berlin/New York 2000, ISBN 978-3-11-016860-0)
- Will-Erich Peuckert: Udl. In: Hanns Bächtold-Stäubli, Eduard Hoffmann-Krayer: Handwörterbuch des Deutschen Aberglaubens: Band 9 Waage-Zypresse, Nachträge. Berlin 1941. (reprint: Walter de Gruyter, Berlin/New York 2000, ISBN 978-3-11-016860-0)
- Paul Zaunert: Deutsche Natursagen: I. Von Holden und Unholden. Jena 1921. (reprint: Salzwasser Verlag, Paderborn 2012, ISBN 978-3-84600253-7)
