= Klagmuhme =

German equivalent of the banshee

The Klagmuhme or Klagemuhme (both: wailing aunt; German: [ˈklaːɡˌmuːmə, ˈklaːɡəˌmuːmə]) is a female sprite from German folklore also known as Klagmutter or Klagemutter (both: wailing mother; German: [ˈklaːɡˌmʊtɐ, ˈklaːɡəˌmʊtɐ]). She heralds imminent death through wailing and whining and is thus the German equivalent of the banshee.

== Other name variants ==
The terms Klagmuhme, Klage, Klag, Wehklage (all: wailing), Klageweib, Klagefrau (both: wailing woman), and Klagmütterle (wailing mother) refer both to the Klagmuhme and to the owl with which the Klagmuhme often is identified. The term Klagmutter also refers to the caterpillar of both the death's-head hawkmoth and of Arctiinae moths.

Further terms are Klagmütterchen (wailing mother), Winselmutter (whining mother), Haulemutter (wailing mother), Klinselweib (wailing woman), and Klagweh (wailing).

The Klagmuhme is first attested in 15th century Middle High German as klagmuoter (wailing mother), denoting an owl.

== Appearance ==
The Klagmuhme often appears as an animal. So she roves howling around the concerned house in the shape of a longhaired black dog, or she sits whiningly in the corner as a white goose or in the eaves gutter as a dove. She also appears as a big gray cat wearing a scarf on its head or during curfew ringing as a whimpering white or three-legged sheep near the concerned house. She further is a very eerie bird, a fiery toad or a calf with red eyes. As a sheep, she will grow to gigantic proportions if pranked by humans.

The Klagmuhme's human appearance is that of an old woman in a black dress with a white scarf. Otherwise, she is described as a small woman with a face covered with cobwebs who is wearing a little three-cornered hat. She also appears clad in linen, as tall as a church steeple, and with glowing eyes or gigantic, hollow-eyed, deathly pale, and dressed in a wafting burial robe.

Her appearance can also be neither human nor animal, though. She then appears as a distorted black figure or a rolling tangled clew, particularly a misshapen blue clew spraying sparks.

== Activities ==
The Klagmuhme's wailing being an omen of death and disaster, it can be downright deadly for those who hear her. If the Klagmuhme wails in front of a house where an ill person is inside, clothing belonging to the diseased is thrown outside the door. If the Klagmuhme carries the clothing away, the diseased will undoubtedly die; if she leaves it behind, the diseased will recover. The prophesied disaster can be averted by immediately telling the Klagmuhme an alternative. In the houses over which she stretches her long bony arm in stormy nights, there will be a corpse ere the moon has finished its cycle.

She is usually invisible when she gets close to the houses without ever entering them and floats over them. Her whining (which sounds like "u-u-u!") can cause frightened people to fall ill with a nervous disease. Otherwise, she does nobody harm. It might happen that a cold shiver can be felt at the sight of the Klagmuhme, though. She is usually active at midnight.

== Origin and identity ==
Regarding its origin, the Klage in Austria is the soul of a deceased. In Saxony, she is the soul of an unlucky mother looking for her drowned son. In the Allgäu, there is a midnight procession of Klagefrauen (wailing women) or of ghostly men carrying a coffin. In Carinthia and Switzerland, the Klagmuhme is part of the wild hunt (German Wildes Heer meaning "wild host"). In the Fichtel Mountains, the Klagmütterlein is a female wood sprite, a Waldweibchen (forest woman). In the Harz, mythologists wrongly identified the Haulemutter with the similar-sounding Frau Holle.

== Literature ==
- Ludwig Bechstein: Deutsches Sagenbuch. Meiningen 1852. (reprint: F. W. Hendel Verlag, Meersburg/Leipzig 1930.)
- Mengis: Gespenst. In: Hanns Bächtold-Stäubli, Eduard Hoffmann-Krayer: Handwörterbuch des Deutschen Aberglaubens: Band 3 Freen-Hexenschuss. Berlin 1931. (reprint: Walter de Gruyter, Berlin/New York 2000, ISBN 978-3-11-016860-0)
- Herold: Schaf. In: Hanns Bächtold-Stäubli, Eduard Hoffmann-Krayer: Handwörterbuch des Deutschen Aberglaubens: Band 7 Pflügen-Signatur. Berlin 1936. (reprint: Walter de Gruyter, Berlin/New York 2000, ISBN 978-3-11-016860-0)
- Hoffmann-Krayer: Klagevogel. In: Hanns Bächtold-Stäubli, Eduard Hoffmann-Krayer: Handwörterbuch des Deutschen Aberglaubens: Band 4 Hieb- und stichfest-Knistern. Berlin 1932. (reprint: Walter de Gruyter, Berlin/New York 2000, ISBN 978-3-11-016860-0)
- Jungbauer: Mitternacht. In: Hanns Bächtold-Stäubli, Eduard Hoffmann-Krayer: Handwörterbuch des Deutschen Aberglaubens: Band 6 Mauer-Pflugbrot. Berlin 1935. (reprint: Walter de Gruyter, Berlin/New York 2000, ISBN 978-3-11-016860-0)
- Peuckert: Kauz. In: Hanns Bächtold-Stäubli, Eduard Hoffmann-Krayer: Handwörterbuch des Deutschen Aberglaubens: Band 4 Hieb- und stichfest-Knistern. Berlin 1932. (reprint: Walter de Gruyter, Berlin/New York 2000, ISBN 978-3-11-016860-0)
- Ranke: Klage, Klagemutter, Wehklage. In: Hanns Bächtold-Stäubli, Eduard Hoffmann-Krayer: Handwörterbuch des Deutschen Aberglaubens: Band 4 Hieb- und stichfest-Knistern. Berlin 1932. (reprint: Walter de Gruyter, Berlin/New York 2000, ISBN 978-3-11-016860-0)
