= Schießschlange =

Legendary serpent from German-speaking Luxembourg

The Schießschlange (shooting snake, German: [ˈʃiːsˌʃlaŋə], pl. Schießschlangen), Schießeschlange or Schießunke (identical meanings) is a legendary creature from German-speaking areas of Luxembourg known to dwell in places with clear water and cool forest shade, such as forests and swamps. The Schießschlange is a serpent whose length exceeds that of ordinary snakes. It wears a golden crown on its head while its body is covered with beautiful, colorful rings which shine brightly. Alternatively, it could also wear a diamond on its head.

The Schießschlangen are known to jump up to the trees, lower down from above, and repeat. This serpent also can fly in the air without any wings. It flies as quickly as an arrow (which is shot, hence the name). If a living creature such as a bird flies in front of the Schießschlange, it will fly right into the serpent's jaws, for a mysterious power inherent to the serpent will draw the bird towards its jaws. While in flight, the Schießschlange might also shoot long beams of fire from its mouth like a dragon. The Schießunke can also steal gold from a castle in regular intervals, hoarding this treasure and hiding it in a horse skull.

When bathing, as it needs to do occasionally, the Schießschlange temporarily places its crown on a rock to avoid dropping it in the water. It cannot stay without its crown for long, though. If the crown gets stolen, the serpent grieves for three days, running around furiously looking for its lost crown. If it cannot recover its crown within this timespan, the Schießschlange will kill itself by hitting its head against a rock or tree, sometimes the very rock it had originally placed the crown on. The same happens if it loses its treasure. If the serpent becomes aware of the identity of the thief, it might chase the human and kill everyone there until its crown or treasure is either voluntarily returned or recovered. Alternatively, it might pierce through the heart of any human it encounters. The only means of rescue would be placing an axe with its back at one's heart, the edge turned towards the Schießunke. Doing this would ensure that the serpent accidentally splits its entire body with the axe head.

== Literature ==
- Nikolaus Gredt: Sagenschatz des Luxemburger Landes. Luxembourg City 1883. (reprint: Holzinger, Berlin 2018, ISBN 9781492328414.)
