= Trasgu =

Mythological creature in northern Spain

The trasgo, trasno or trasgu is a mythological creature present in the tradition of several cultures of what is now northern Spain, especially in Galician, Asturian and Cantabrian traditional culture, it is also found in legends of North Portugal. There are similar creatures in the mythologies of other European cultures, such as the "gnome", "sylph", and the "kobold". The origin of this mythological creature is Celtic.

== Portuguese Mythology ==
Trasgu or trasno (in Galician and Portuguese) is very common in the folklore of Trás-os-Montes and it was taken by the Portuguese throughout their empire originating similar myths like the Saci in Brazil.

== Asturian Mythology ==
The trasgu is the best known being of Asturian mythology, and is shared with mythologies of Celtic origin, like Galicia's. It is a domestic goblin with a mischievous and nervous character. It is often represented as a tiny man who limps with his right leg; he has dark skin, wears red clothes and a pointy red hat. He has a hole in his left hand. He is described at times as having horns, tail, sheep ears and long legs, and wearing a long black and gray cloak; at other times he is described as small, with long thin legs and wearing a tight dark brown dress.

Nocturnal noises are attributed to him, and also small pranks like changing the location of objects. He enters homes at night when the inhabitants are asleep. If he is in a bad mood he breaks kitchen vessels, spooks cattle, stirs chests of clothes and spills water. These activities do not cause material damage, because the inhabitants find everything as they left it. On the other hand, when he is treated well, he does house chores during the night.

In Asturias, the trasgu is known by different names depending on the location. He is known as Trasno, Cornín or Xuan Dos Camíos in western Asturias. He is known as Gorretín Coloráu or the one with the "gorra encarnada" (both meaning "little red hat") in eastern Asturias.

=== How to get rid of him ===
It is difficult to get rid of him. If the house inhabitants decide to move to a new house, he follows them. In a tale, the inhabitants of a house abandoned it because of the trasgu. On their way to the new house, the woman asks her husband: "Have we left anything?" The trasgu, following them, answers: "You have left the lamp, but I'm carrying it."

In order to expel a trasgu it is necessary to request of him an impossible task, like bringing a basket of water from the sea, picking up millet from the floor (it falls through the hole in his hand), and whitening a black sheep. Because he thinks himself capable of doing everything, he accepts the challenge. In his stubbornness, he will try until he becomes exhausted. When he fails to accomplish the tasks, his pride is hurt. He leaves and does not return. He will also become spooked if someone falsely recreates actions proper of goblins.

== Cantabrian Mythology ==
In Cantabria, the trasgu is a small goblin with black face and green eyes that inhabits forests. His main activity is to mock people and carry out pranks, especially against girls who are engaged in a specific activity, like shepherding. Because he must hide from humans, his clothes are made of tree leaves and moss.

== Presence in Literature ==
Trasgu's pranks are told with variations in numerous towns of the Iberian peninsula, and his adventures are evoked in classical works of Spanish literature, like the anonymous 1554 novella Lazarillo de Tormes, the short farces of Miguel de Cervantes and the comedies of Lope de Vega.

In instances of fantasy literature, and many times in sword and sorcery literature, the term "trasgo" may be confused with "orc", when it more generally is used to translate the English term "goblin" (and vice versa from Spanish to English). For example, the Spanish translation of the novel The Hobbit by J. R. R. Tolkien uses the term "trasgo" to signify the "goblins". However, in the Spanish translation of The Lord of the Rings, the orcs are referred to by the term "orcos".

Brazilian Portuguese translation of J. K. Rowling's Harry Potter novel series by Lia Wyler uses the word "trasgo" to refer to the creatures known in English editions as trolls.

== See also ==
- Goblin
