= Bahkauv =

Monster

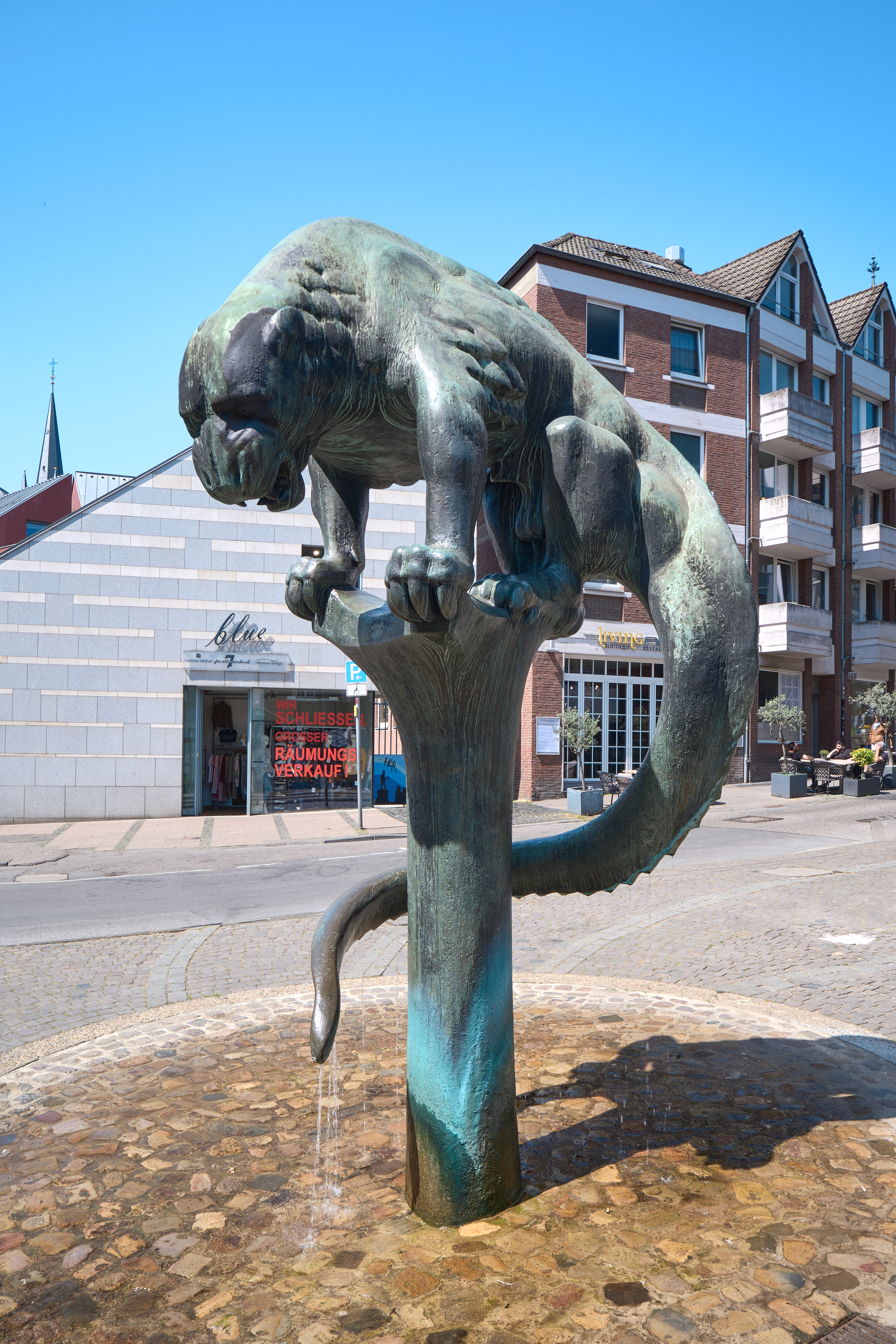
Statue depicting the Bahkauv in Aachen

The Bahkauv is a mythical monster said to reside in Aachen, Germany. The creature has been featured in the folklore of both Aachen and the Rhineland. Often depicted as a deformed calf with fangs, the Bahkauv is commonly associated with drunken men.

== Legend ==
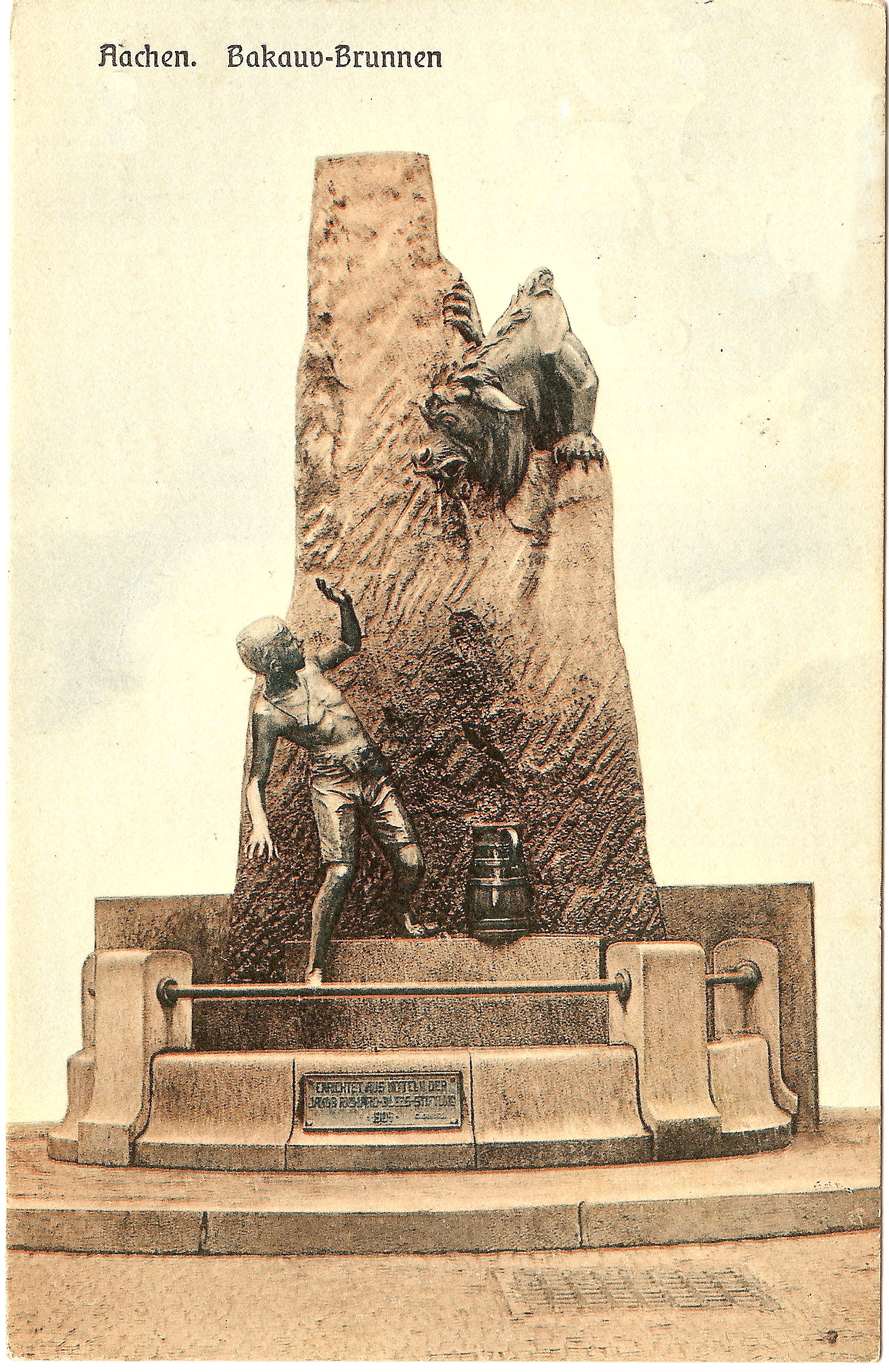
Pre-World War statue of the Bahkauv built over a fountain the creature was associated with

The Bahkauv is typically described as being similar to an elongated or deformed calf with sharp fangs. According to legend, the creature often lurks near fountains, streams, and sewers. The Aachen city sewers and the many thermal springs found under the city have been cited as a dwelling place for the Bahkauv. One legend holds that Pippin the Younger slew a Bahkauv as it was lying by a spring. In 1902 the city of Aachen erected a statue of the Bahkauv over an old well that had been associated with the monster. This statue was melted down for its metal in World War II, prompting the city to build a second statue in 1967. This statue persists to the present day.

The Bahkauv is associated with harassing drunk men. In legend, the creature would ambush intoxicated men at night and latch onto their shoulders, forcing them to carry it around before attacking them.
