= Petermännchen =

German household spirit

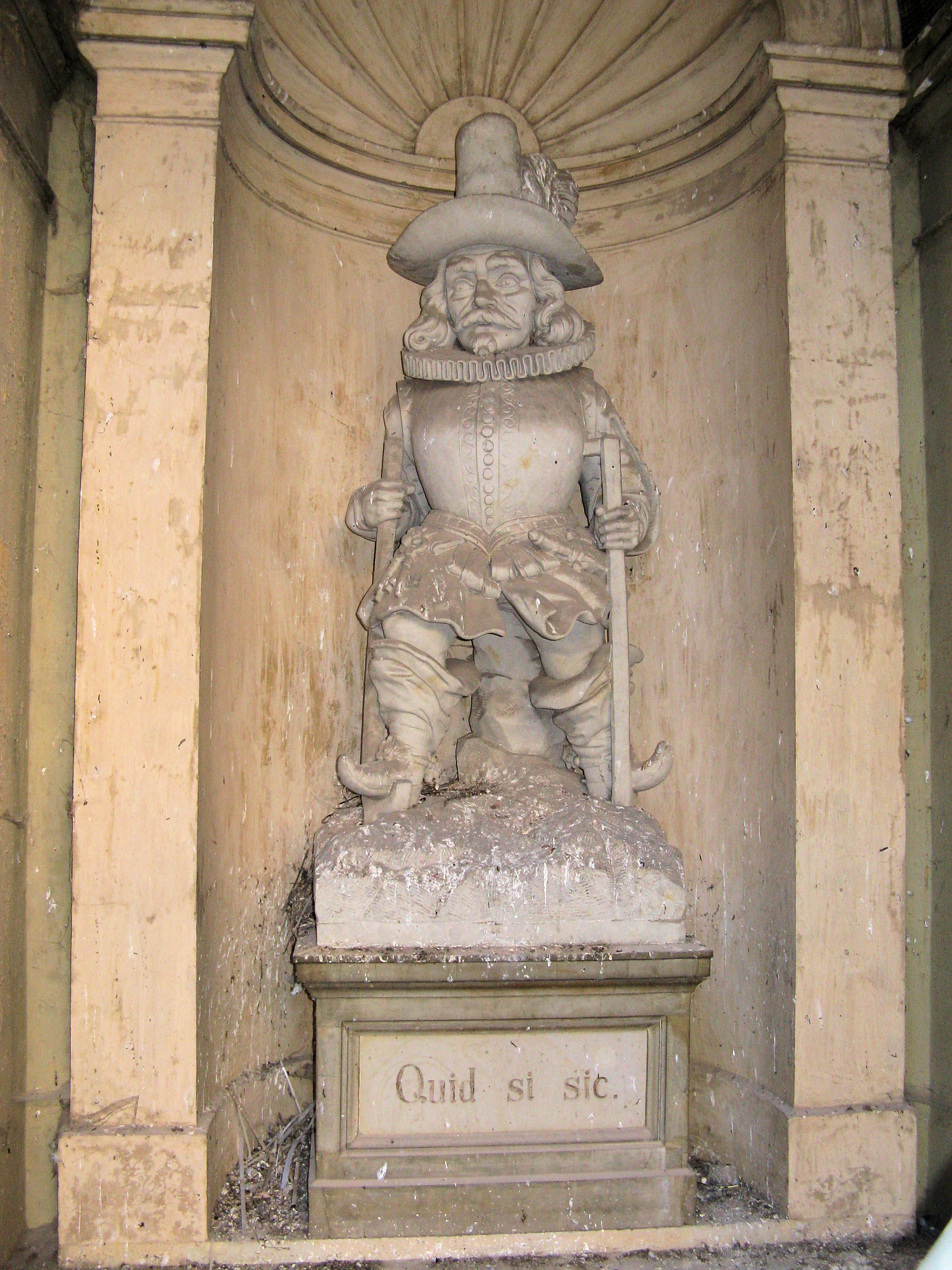
Statue of Petermännchen

Petermännchen (English: "Little Peterman"; German: [ˈpeːtɐˌmɛnçən]) is a small good-natured household spirit who is said to live in the Schwerin Palace in Schwerin, Mecklenburg, Germany. The diminutive spirit, maybe only a few feet tall, is often described as carrying many keys, roaming through the vaults and tunnels underneath the castle, unlocking doors as he goes. Other descriptions of Petermännchen have him carrying a lantern and a sword or dagger. He is also said to be the keeper and watchman of the castle, rewarding those who are honest and good. Conversely the spirit will punish or drive away thieves and intruders. To do so Petermännchen will cause a nuisance or play pranks. The spirit is said to make crashing and banging noises at night. Petermännchen is also said to have woken soldiers who fell asleep on their night-watch in order to save them from being punished.

Legend further has it that when Christianity first came to the Schwerin area, a pagan god, who was worshiped at the site of the present Schwerin castle, fled leaving his servants, the spirits. Eventually these spirits also departed, except for one: Petermännchen, who would not leave his post. Other legends surrounding the ghost have him once working in the tunnels as a blacksmith.

Petermännchen has been described as appearing in numerous forms over the years, sometimes as an old man with a white, flowing beard extended down to his waist. On another occasions Petermännchen would have a cavalier look with a stylish moustache, wearing a waistcoat, riding boots with spurs and a feathered hat.
