= Christa Agnes Tuczay =

Christa Agnes Tuczay (born 7 February 1952 in Eisenstadt) is an Austrian University professor in Medieval German Language and Literature at the Institute of German Studies at the University of Vienna. Tuczay is well known for her research on narratives and fairytales in the Middle Ages.

== Biography ==
Tuczay studied German Literature and Pedagogy, Philosophy and Psychology and also Ethnology, Indology and Finnish and Hungarian Studies at the University of Vienna, gaining the title of Magister in 1978. In 1981 she received her doctorate with a study on the fairytale motif "Der Unhold ohne Seele" (the soulless monster). From 1981 to 2006 she was a researcher in the Austrian Academy of Sciences’ (OeAW) "Motif Index of German Secular Narrative Literature from the Beginnings to 1400". Currently, Tuczay lectures at the Institute of German Studies at the University of Vienna. She has also been a visiting professor in Chiang Mai (Thailand), Innsbruck and Klagenfurt.

== Research foci ==
Tuczay's research focuses on narratives, cultural studies, history of mentality, history of magic and the psychohistory of the Middle Ages. Her interest in narratives and fairytales was sparked during her undergraduate days, and she eventually wrote her doctoral thesis on an international fairytale motif. With her knowledge on this area she also contributed to the OeAW project "Motif Index of German Secular Narrative Literature from the Beginnings to 1400". She has also written several entries in the Encyclopedia of Fairy Tales.

From 1999 onwards, Tuczay worked on the edited volumes in the series “Mythen des Mittelalters” (Myths in the Middle Ages) and contributed with various articles. Together with researchers on the Motif-Index she edited a volume of collected papers on the modern Austrian legend. Since the publication of "Magie im Mittelalter" (Magic in the Middle Ages) Tuczay has been dedicated to the special field of research on witchcraft, which has been on the rise since the 1980s, from the perspective of history of mentality and cultural studies, resulting in various articles in English- and German-speaking anthologies. Her monograph "Kulturgeschichte der mittelalterlichen Wahrsagerei" (A Cultural History of Medieval Fortune Telling), published in 2012, focuses on the topic of divination, briefly outlined in "Magie und Magier im Mittelalter".

In her habilitation Tuczay examines the subject of ecstasy, experienced in medieval texts as a desirable borderline experience. Her work in this area introduced her to research on shamanism in Hungary, where she has contributed to the frequent congresses and publications in the field. A related experience, dreams and visions, has been the focus of Tuczay's psychohistorical observations, including a three-part series on revenants, human-to-animal transformation and occultism.

Besides these research foci, Tuczay has written many articles on topics firmly rooted in medieval German studies. Her book "Herzesser" (Heart Eaters) also examines the history of crime and mentality in Austria.

== Publications (selection) ==
- Geister, Dämonen Phantasmen – eine Kulturgeschichte. Wiesbaden (Marix) 2015. ISBN 978-3-7374-0972-8
- Die aventiurehafte Dietrichepik: Laurin und Walberan, jüngerer Sigenot, Eckenlied, Wunderer, Mittelhochdeutscher Text mit neuhochdeutscher Übersetzung (GAG 599), Göppingen (Kümmerle Verlag) 1999. ISBN 3-87452-841-3
- Co-editor and co-author of the edited volumes Vater Ötzi und das Krokodil im Donaukanal, Moderne Sagen aus Österreich, Der poetische Wiedergänger, Faszination des Okkulten und Tierverwandlungen, Jenseits.
- Ir sult sprechen willekomen. Grenzenlose Mediävistik, Festschrift für Helmut Birkhan zum 60. Geburtstag, ed. by Ulrike Hirhager, Karin Lichtblau, Christa Agnes Tuczay. Bern (Peter Lang) 1998. ISBN 978-3-906759-24-1
- Poetische Wiedergänger – Deutschsprachige Vampirismus-Diskurse vom Mittelalter bis zur Gegenwart, ed. by Christa Agnes Tuczay and Julia Bertschik, Tübingen (Francke Verlag) 2004. ISBN 3-77208-080-4
- Faszination des Okkulten. Diskurse zum Übersinnlichen, ed. by Christa Agnes Tuczay and Wolfgang Müller-Funk: Tübingen (Francke Verlag) 2008. ISBN 3-77208-259-9
- Tierverwandlungen. Codierungen und Diskurse, ed. by Christa Agnes Tuczay and Willem de Blécourt. Tübingen (Francke Verlag) 2011. ISBN 3-77208-406-0
- Jenseits – Eine mittelalterliche und mediävistische Imagination: Interdisziplinäre Ansätze zur Analyse des Unerklärlichen. (=Beihefte zur Mediävistik, ed. by Peter Dinzelbacher and Romedio Schmitz-Esser Vol. 21). Frankfurt (Peter Lang) 2015. ISBN 978-3-631-66836-8
- Tuczay, C.A. (2004). Interactions with Apparitions, Ghosts, and Revenants in Ancient and Medieval Sources. In: Houran, J. (ed). From Shamans to Scientists: Essays on Humanity's Search for Spirits. Lanham, Md.: Scarecrow Press: 97-126.

A comprehensive list of Tuczay's publications can be found on the webpage of the University of Vienna.
