= Jack o' the bowl =

Swiss mythical helpful house spirit

In Swiss folklore, Jack o' the bowl (or Jack-of-the-Bowl) is a helpful house spirit and variously described as a brownie or kobold.

He is otherwise known as Jean de la Boliéta in French, or Napf-Hans in German. In return for a bowl of sweet cream left out for him each night, he would lead the cows to graze in places considered dangerous to humans, but none of the cows ever suffered injury. The path used by him was always clear of stones no matter how rocky the mountainside, and this came to be known as Boliéta's Path.

== See also ==
- Dwarf (mythology)
- Gnome
- Hobgoblin
