= Fenixmännlein =

Dwarf or earth sprite from German folklore

The Fenixmännlein (sg., pl.; German: [ˈfeːnɪksˌmɛnlaɪ̯n]; Männlein = little man), also called Fenixmännel, Fenskemännel, Feensmännel (all sg., pl.;Männel = little man in Silesian German) or Fenesleute (pl.; Leute = people) among other names are earth sprites and dwarves from German folklore. They were historically known in Silesia, particularly in the Oderské vrchy and Hrubý Jeseník as well as in the part of Lusatia belonging to Saxony. The first element of the name, Fenix- or variants, might either come from a Middle High German expression ein wenigez mennelin (= a little diminutive man) or from legendary beings called Venedigermännlein (sg., pl.; little Venetian men) or Walen (pl., sg. Wale), a kind of mythical miners or prospectors often said to hail from Venice. The latter option is supported by the fact that both Fenixmännlein and Venedigermännlein are supposed to be bigger than dwarves (German Zwerge, sg. Zwerg) but smaller than humans.

The Fenixmännlein are collective beings dwelling in hills and shrubbery.

Inside the mountains, they throw big parties. The Fenismannla (pl. Mannla = little men in Silesian German) are said to be the original owners of the recipe for Silesian streuselkuchen. When the Fänismännchen (sg., pl.;Männchen = little man) are baking cake in their caves, smoke is rising from earth holes and from beneath clods. They also can be heard kneading dough and forming cakes. But not only the male Fenixmännlein know how to bake, their female equivalent, the Venusweiblein (sg., pl.; Weiblein = little woman), do too. The Fenichmännchen or Fenskemännchen (both sg., pl.) cook as well. The same is true for the Fenskeweibel (sg., pl.; Weibel = little woman in Silesian German) who also gather wood and grind coffee with a coffee grinder.

Furthermore, the Vensmännel dry their linen on the riverbank.

== Interaction with humans ==
=== Abductions and changelings ===
The Fenixmännlein are known to occasionally exchange human children for their own which are left behind as changelings. Sneaking around the windows, the Fenisweibel (sg., pl.) will use an unguarded moment to exchange the human baby for a changeling. As soon as this has happened, the father will have to chase the female dwarves on horseback. Upon reaching them, he will have to throw them the changeling and snatch his own child. Then he has to hurry back, throwing strands of yarn behind him which the Fenisweibel will have to reel, thus keeping them temporarily occupied. Only upon returning home the child will be safe. Another man saved his child from the Fenixmännchen by driving his wagon in front of their cave, snatching his child and throwing yarn at his pursuers.

The changelings the Fenixmännel have brought will cause Alpdruck, i.e. torment sleepers with nightmares. Those changelings the Fenixmannla have brought will dob so predominantly at noon.

The Fenixmännchen steer a ship with which they abduct all humans having the bad luck of getting too close to it. Underneath the hills, there is a vast subterranean realm, entirely covered with water on which they row to and fro.

The Fenixmännlein particularly like abducting women in childbed, carrying them off to the Fenixmannlaberg (Fenix Men Mountain) to care for their children or for washing. Rescuing such an abducted woman is no easy task, for countless Fenixmännel will chase the rescuer and the woman. The rescuer will need to ride his horse as fast as he can, all the while throwing behind him flax (the dwarves must pull) a comb (the dwarves must heckle the flax with) and soap (the dwarves will slip on). Only when the woman is successfully carried beneath the roof the Fenixleute will have no power over her any longer. Another abducted woman in childbed forced to regularly wash the Fenixmännchen’s laundry asked passing people to give her a stand of unwetted yarn. The dwarves had to reel this first. During that time, the woman could be carried over the water to safety.

=== Baking and cakes ===
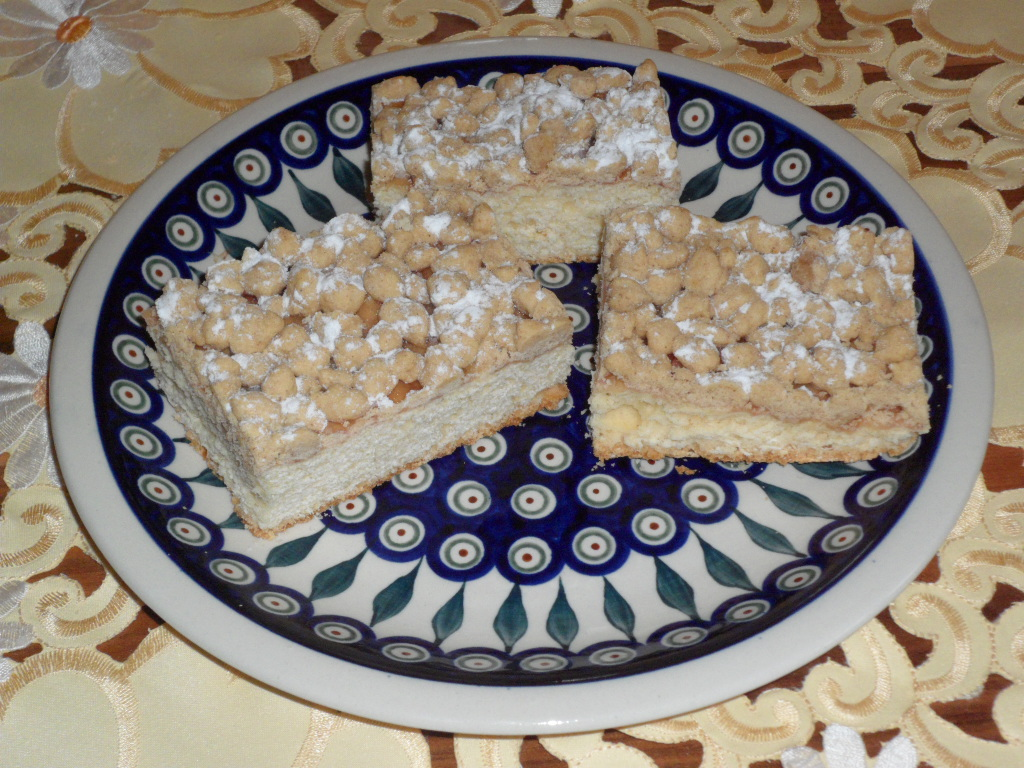
Silesian streuselkuchen

Sometimes, cake is a reason for interaction between the Fenesleute and humans. The cake in question usually is Silesian streuselkuchen. The Feenstweiber (pl.; sg. Feenstweib; Weib = woman) once chased a ploughing farmhand who rode off on his horse because he feared the cake he had been offered. It was bloody on top.

Another ploughboy working near the Feenixhöhlen (Feenix Caves) in what was then Austrian Silesia saw smoke rising and thus asked the baking Feenixweibel to share their cake with him. Immediately, an invisible hand gave him a Krautkuchen (cabbage cake) coated with green linseed oil. At the same time, he got threatened to eat this cake on a table made from iron or else he would be done for. The ploughboy fulfilled the condition by using his ploughshare as the iron table.

The same happened to a ploughing farmer who heard the Fenixmannla kneading dough and forming cakes in the Fenixmannlaberg (Fenix Men Mountain), requesting a piece. He, too, had to eat on an iron ploughshare.

Another farmhand who was ploughing with his farmer near the Fenichsmannlabarg (Fenichs Men Mountain in Silesian German) on Easter Saturday saw smoke rising from the ploughed furrow on the ground. He, too, wished to have a piece of easter cake the Fenixmannla were baking, and albeit he was rather talking to himself, he found a piece of streuselkuchen waiting for him. He ate it partially, thanked the Fenixmannla, and took the rest home in his handkerchief, putting it in his drawer. There, the piece of cake regenerated for every meal as long as a rest was left over. Only, a jealous colleague ate the whole cake one day after which it was gone. Similarly, the Phonismännlein (sg., pl.) and the Fenixmändel (sg., pl.; Mändel = little man in Silesian German) from the Fenichsmannlaberg (Fenichs Men Mountain) give the condition of eating the cake without eating it whole.

The Venusweiblein gift cake to travelers passing by their cave and the Fenichmännlein share their food with the poor.

Sometimes, their cake can transform in something else. The cake of the Fenixmannla turns to lead inside the stomach. The Krautplatz (cabbage cake) of the Fenesleute dwelling in the Fenesloch (Fenes Hole) turns to dust. The cake of the Fenixmännchen might also turn to gold.

When the Venusmänndel wish to bake, they steal the dough from the villages.

The Fenixmännchen involuntarily disclosed their recipe for Silesian streuselkuchen to a poor girl, who, after hearing griddles clattering in the mountain, secretly approached the dwarves during the Twelve Days of Christmas and observed the Fenixmännchen baking. Recreating this recipe on Carnival, the cake became so popular that the girl was able to marry her beloved, the son of a wealthy farmer won over by her baking skills.

=== Other interactions ===
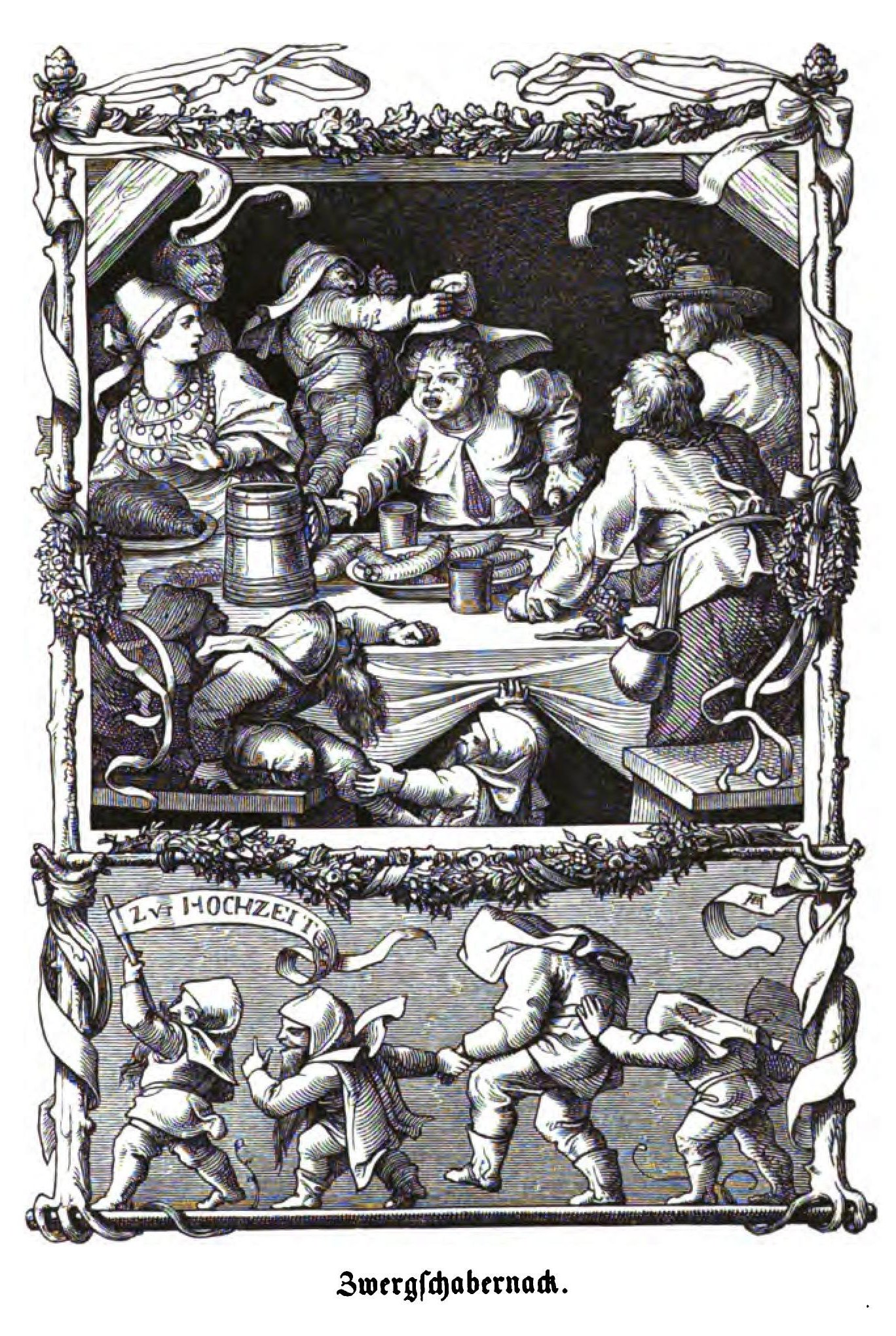
The Fenixmännlein invite themselves invisibly to weddings and also take a human along - the text on the flag says, "to the wedding", the text below, "dwarven shenanigans"

The Feensmännel dwelling in the Veensmännelberg or Feensmännelberg (Feens Men Mountain) in the Saxon part of Lusatia used to lend their brewing copper to the citizens of Ostritz. After brewing their beer, the people returned the brewing copper by placing it on a footbridge crossing the Neisse river and leaving a bread roll inside the kettle. This lasted until somebody took the bread roll and left dirt inside instead.

The Feensmännelberg shortly opens on Christmas Eve during consecration. Then, the dwarves become visible as a crowd of little men or old men with long white beards wearing very short clothes. They rummage through heaps of gold. Should a traveler chance upon this sight, the Feensmännel will tell them monotonously to take a hand full of gold and get going.

A ploughing farmhand near the Fenixmänndelberg (Fenix Men Mountain) in Silesia heard the Fenixmänndel (sg., pl.; Männdel = little man in Silesian German) asking to be given a cloak of invisibility (rather a cap, for the German term is Nebelkappe = fog cap) so they might secretly visit a nearby wedding. The farmhand asked to be given such magical headdress as well, and joined the reverlry invisibly as well. All was well, with four or five Fenixmänndel sitting around every bowl, until the farmhand got in conflict with the dwarves over a bowl and his Nebelkappe got taken back. At another wedding, a woodcutter lost his Nebelkappe due to laughing despite being forbidden to do so.

== Disappearance ==
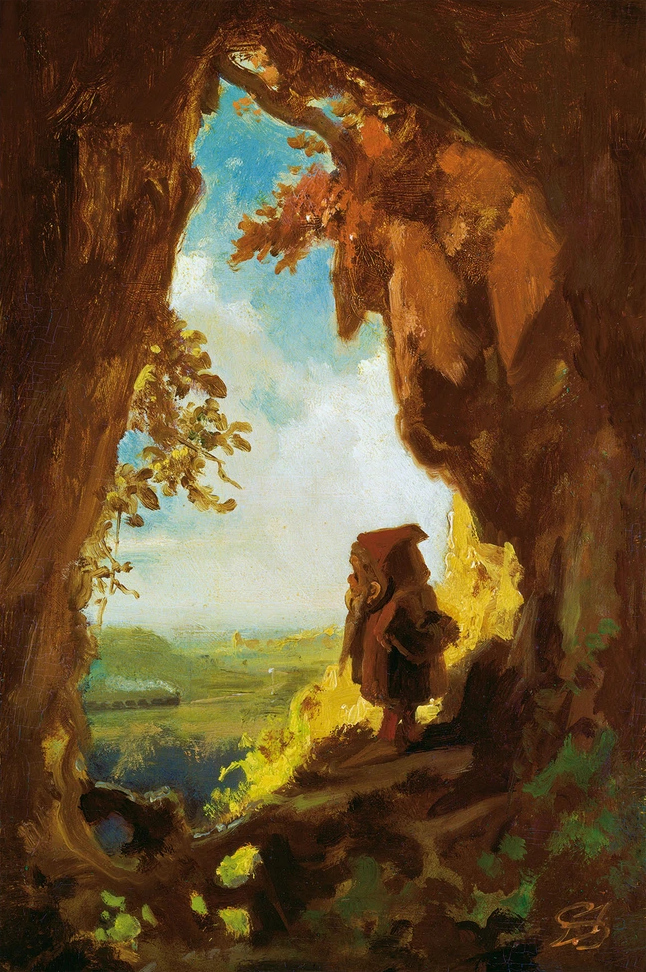
The railways drove the Fenixmännlein away.

In Austrian Silesia, the Fenesleute have moved out of the country. This happened because people started adding parsley to their dishes which they were unable to tolerate. The introduction railways also made the Fenesleute migrate, crossing the sea on barrels and sieves to America or England. This is true for both Fenesmannel (sg., pl.; Mannel = little man in Silesian German) and Fenesweibel. Another tradition has the Venusmändel (sg., pl.) crossing water on baking trays.

Alternatively, it is said that the pope exorcised the Fenixmannla from Silesia who crossed the river Neisse on a barge. They came from the Fenichsmannlaberg (Fenichs Men Mountain) and were exorcised due to frequently abducting children. To cross the river, the Fenichsmannlakönig (Fenichs Men King), a little gray man wearing a golden crown, asked a fisherman to ferry hiss people over. The gray and black Fenichsmannla entered the boat like a large swarm of mice until the barge was full and became hard to steer. The fisherman needed to ferry nine times until all dwarves had crossed the Neisse. As payment, the king put withered leaves in the fisherman’s hat who angrily threw away all leaves but one which later turned into gold. Another variant has it that ferrying the Fenixmännchen lasted the whole day and every dwarf threw a leaf inside the ferryman’s hat.

According another tradition, the Fähnskedinger (pl.; sg. Fähnskeding; Ding = thing) as well as ghosts in general left Silesia after the land came under Prussian rule.

In Lusatia, the Venusmännel or Feensmännel migrated westwards after Ostritz had got its bell tower. The dwarves could not stand the sound of the large bell in particular. Thus, they moved out of their mountain, wearing very short clothes and carrying milking pails on their heads.

In Strumień, the Venusweiblein (sg., pl.) or Fênsweibla (pl.; Weibla = little women in Silesian German) loved helping humans, working for them in secret at night and thus bringing good fortune and blessings. A curious tailor’s wife wanted to see the little helpers. Thus, after many unsuccessful attempts, she spilled peas in the chamber to make the Fênsweibla fall so they might not escape as quickly. The female dwarves did indeed fall but when the woman came to see them, they were already gone never to return.

== Literature ==
- Eckstein: Backen. In: Hanns Bächtold-Stäubli, Eduard Hoffmann-Krayer: Handwörterbuch des Deutschen Aberglaubens: Band 1 Aal-Butzemann. Berlin 1927. (reprint: Walter de Gruyter, Berlin/New York 2000, ISBN 978-3-11-016860-0)
- Eckstein: Kuchen. In: Hanns Bächtold-Stäubli, Eduard Hoffmann-Krayer: Handwörterbuch des Deutschen Aberglaubens: Band 5 Knoblauch-Matthias. Berlin 1933. (reprint: Walter de Gruyter, Berlin/New York 2000, ISBN 978-3-11-016860-0)
- Eckstein: Milch. In: Hanns Bächtold-Stäubli, Eduard Hoffmann-Krayer: Handwörterbuch des Deutschen Aberglaubens: Band 6 Mauer-Pflugbrot. Berlin 1935. (reprint: Walter de Gruyter, Berlin/New York 2000, ISBN 978-3-11-016860-0)
- Eckstein: Sieb. In: Hanns Bächtold-Stäubli, Eduard Hoffmann-Krayer: Handwörterbuch des Deutschen Aberglaubens: Band 7 Pflügen-Signatur. Berlin 1936. (reprint: Walter de Gruyter, Berlin/New York 2000, ISBN 978-3-11-016860-0)
- Eckstein: Speise. In: Hanns Bächtold-Stäubli, Eduard Hoffmann-Krayer: Handwörterbuch des Deutschen Aberglaubens: Band 8 Silber-Vulkan. Berlin 1937. (reprint: Walter de Gruyter, Berlin/New York 2000, ISBN 978-3-11-016860-0)
- Eckstein: Teig. In: Hanns Bächtold-Stäubli, Eduard Hoffmann-Krayer: Handwörterbuch des Deutschen Aberglaubens: Band 8 Silber-Vulkan. Berlin 1937. (reprint: Walter de Gruyter, Berlin/New York 2000, ISBN 978-3-11-016860-0)
- Hünnerkopf: Garn. In: Hanns Bächtold-Stäubli, Eduard Hoffmann-Krayer: Handwörterbuch des Deutschen Aberglaubens: Band 3 Freen-Hexenschuss. Berlin 1931. (reprint: Walter de Gruyter, Berlin/New York 2000, ISBN 978-3-11-016860-0)
- Jungbauer: Mittag. In: Hanns Bächtold-Stäubli, Eduard Hoffmann-Krayer: Handwörterbuch des Deutschen Aberglaubens: Band 6 Mauer-Pflugbrot. Berlin 1935. (reprint: Walter de Gruyter, Berlin/New York 2000, ISBN 978-3-11-016860-0)
- Jungwirth: Fährmann. In: Hanns Bächtold-Stäubli, Eduard Hoffmann-Krayer: Handwörterbuch des Deutschen Aberglaubens: Band 2 C.M.B.-Frautragen. Berlin 1930. (reprint: Walter de Gruyter, Berlin/New York 2000, ISBN 978-3-11-016860-0)
- Karle: kochen. In: Hanns Bächtold-Stäubli, Eduard Hoffmann-Krayer: Handwörterbuch des Deutschen Aberglaubens: Band 5 Knoblauch-Matthias. Berlin 1933. (reprint: Walter de Gruyter, Berlin/New York 2000, ISBN 978-3-11-016860-0)
- R. Kühnau: Sagen aus Schlesien. Berlin 1914. (reprint: Salzwasser Verlag, Paderborn 2011, ISBN 978-3-8460-0190-5)
- Alfred Meiche: Sagenbuch des Königreichs Sachsen. Leipzig 1903 (reprint: Salzwasser Verlag, Paderborn 2012, ISBN 978-3-8460-0205-6.
- Müller-Bergström: Zwerge und Riesen. In: Hanns Bächtold-Stäubli, Eduard Hoffmann-Krayer: Handwörterbuch des Deutschen Aberglaubens: Band 9 Waage-Zypresse, Nachträge. Berlin 1941. (reprint: Walter de Gruyter, Berlin/New York 2000, ISBN 978-3-11-016860-0)
- Will-Erich Peuckert: Schlesische Sagen. Munich 1924. (reprint: Eugen Diederichs Verlag, Munich 1993, ISBN 3-424-00986-5)
- Leander Petzold: Kleines Lexikon der Dämonen und Elementargeister. Verlag C. H. Beck, Munich 1990, ISBN 978-3-406-34019-9)
- Ranke: Alp. In: Hanns Bächtold-Stäubli, Eduard Hoffmann-Krayer: Handwörterbuch des Deutschen Aberglaubens: Band 1 Aal-Butzemann. Berlin 1927. (reprint: Walter de Gruyter, Berlin/New York 2000, ISBN 978-3-11-016860-0)
- Paul Zaunert: Deutsche Natursagen: I. Von Holden und Unholden. Jena 1921. (reprint: Salzwasser Verlag, Paderborn 2012, ISBN 3-84600253-7)
