= Erdhenne =

The Erdhenne (German: lit. Earth Hen; German: [ˈeːɐ̯tˌhɛnə]), alternatively called Coluber domesticus, Erdhühnlein, Erdglucke, Erdglutsch, or Herdhendl, is a German house spirit originating from German folklore of the Alp region, the Upper Palatinate, and Bavaria.

== Description ==
Most of the time, the Erdhenne remains unseen, only communicating with the inhabitants of its home by clucking loudly, as if calling chicks. By this, they alert the inhabitants of dangers threatening them or the house. Some legends claim that the spirit answers questions about the danger when asked directly.

When not hiding in the shadows of the farmhouse kitchen or beneath the ground, the spirit appears as an old, ash grey, shaggy hen with a short neck. By becoming visible, the Erdhenne foretells death within a year, usually that of the person it shows itself to. However, according to another legend, should it cluck and flutter its wings nine times, the head of the house would fall deadly ill.

Johann Andreas Schmeller ridiculed the myths of the Erdhenne in his Bayerisches Wörterbuch, claiming that reports about it were created by misinterpreting moonlight shining through crown glass windows. According to his writings, this created a bright halo with something dark in the center, which was made up to be a protective spirit.
