= Aufhocker =

Shapeshifter in German folklore

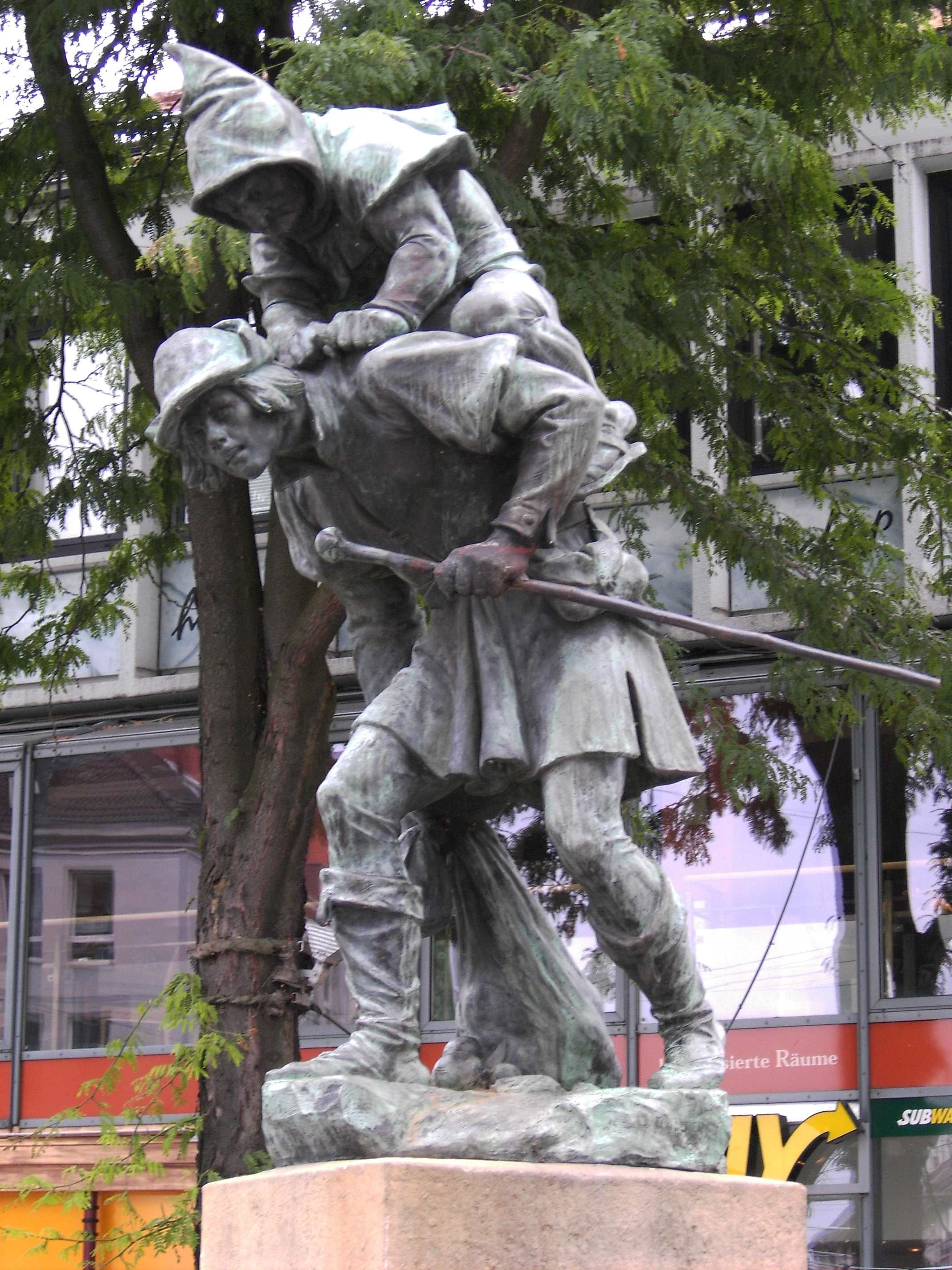
German statue of a huckup having leapt onto an apple thief's back

The aufhocker (German: [ˈaʊfˌhɔkɐ]) or huckup (German: [ˈhʊkˌʔʊp]) is a shapeshifter in German folklore.

== Characteristics ==
The Aufhocker is described in German legend as having an unidentifiable shape because it takes on shapes such as a goblin, a beautiful woman, a dead man, or various animals.

== Legend ==
The name Aufhocker means "leap upon". This name is used because according to legend, the Aufhocker would leap upon the back of its victims which are often thieves and criminals that need to be taught a lesson. Other common targets in the Aufhocker legend are lone travelers and old women.

The Aufhocker is known as a pressure spirit or perching spirit because it jumps on the backs of travelers weighing them down with every step. The victims often die of exhaustion because the Aufhocker cannot be shaken off or killed. However, it is believed that travelers can free themselves if they are able to make it home before being killed. These attacks often occur in specific locations such as bridges, crossroads, springs, woods, on a path through a hollow, and cemeteries.

The Aufhocker is a very dangerous theriomorph that is sometimes said to tear out the throats of humans instead of killing its victims from exhaustion. The version of the Aufhocker that attacks victims' throats is linked to vampirism. In vampire mythology, sunlight and church bells are often used to frighten vampires away and may be applicable defenses against the Aufhocker also.

The Aufhocker legend is sometimes interpreted as a metaphor for emotional burdens weighing on one’s shoulders no matter how hard they try to shake off their memories. The old woman that is a victim in some version of the legend represents time itself. The old woman is scared of getting older and has more memories to haunt her. Some other speculators say the Aufhocker legend is instead a materialization of Night Terrors.

Similar myths can be found in most of Europe. In the Charente-Maritime département of France, the Ganipote is depicted as having similar traits. In the formerly German-speaking parts of Bohemia, the same is attributed to the Uhaml.
