= Kobold =

Sprite stemming from Germanic mythology

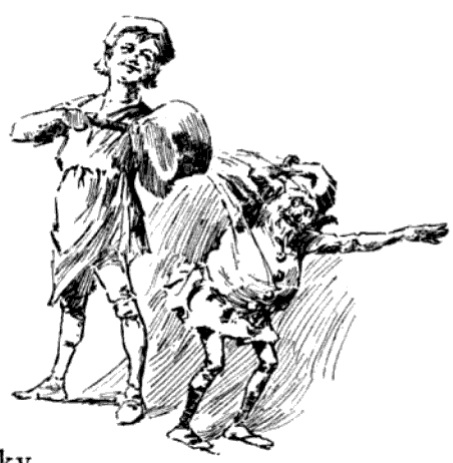
The kobold of Hildesheim ―Illustrated by William A. McCullough, Nymphs, Nixies and Naiads (1895)

Kobold (German: [ˈkoːbɔlt]; kobolt, kobolde, cobold) is a generic name for a household spirit (hausgeist) in German folklore.

Kobolds are associated with both mischief and the performance of helpful tasks – especially household chores. These chores are often performed in exchange for offerings. Although, kobolds may cause damage when they feel mistreated. (Note: e.g., cut up into pieces and left in a kettle or pot.)

A hütchen (Low German: hodeken), meaning "little hat", is one subtype of kobold; teehis and other kobold sprites are known for their pointy red caps. Others, such as the niss (cognate of nisse of Norway) or puk (cognate of puck fairy) which are often said to be seen in Northern Germany, alongside drak, a dragon-type name, the sprite is sometimes said to appear as a shaft of fire with what looks like a head. There is also the combined form Nis Puk.

Hinzelmann, a house sprite, is a shapeshifter assuming many forms, such as a feather or animal. The name supposedly refers to it appearing in cat-form, Hinz[e] being an archetypical cat name. The similarly named Heinzelmännchen of Cologne (recorded 1826) is distinguished from Hinzelmann. (Note: Heinz- and Hinzelmann were treated as interchangeable in the 129th century by Grimm, as well as Thomas Keightley following his footsteps. However the modern-day entry for "Heinzelmänchen" in the Etymologisches Wörterbuch explains the distinction. Weiser-Aall's article in the HdA classifies Hinzelmann under category "C. Appearance-based names" (rathe than "E pet names/shortened affectionate names of people"), while Cologne's Heinzelmänchen falls under "H. literary names". Whereas Lecouteux's dictionary gives "Heinzelmännchen" as one "coined from first names", and groups it with Wolterken, Niss, Chimken (all kobold names), in contrast to HdA. Note a recent publication has a "Kobold" chapter which includes a map of Germany plotting subtype kobold names for each region, but the Cologne area is left blank.)

The Schrat is cross-categorized as a wood sprite and a house sprite, and some regional examples correspond to kobold, e.g., Upper Franconia in northern Bavaria. (Note: The area is described as "southeastern Germany", with the cited sources pointing to the general area of Northern Bavarian including the Upper Palatinate onto Vogtland which extends to Thuringia. (Cf. Schrat and § Cretin names below)) The kobold is sometimes conflated with the mine demon kobel or Bergmännlein/Bergmännchen, which Paracelsus equated with the earth elemental gnome. It is generally noted that there can be no clear demarcation made between a kobold and nature spirits.

The Klabautermann aboard ships are sometimes classed as a kobold.

== Overview ==
A kobold is known by various names. As a household spirit, it may perform chores such as tidying the kitchen. It can also be prankish, and when mistreated, it can resort to retribution, sometimes of the utmost cruelty. It is often said that a household must put out sweet milk (and bread or bread soup) as an offering to keep it on good behaviour.

The legend of the house sprite's retribution is quite old. The tale of the hütchen (or hodekin in Low German, meaning "little hat") is set in the historical background after c. 1130 and attested in a work c. 1500 (later retold as Grimms Deutsche Sagen No. 74). (Note: Tristhemius (d. 1516), Chronicle of Hildesheim, which dates the events to c.1130.) (Note: Grimm's version combines multiple sources, including Erasmus Francisci (1690) which includes the tale under the header of "kobold".) The sprite that haunted the castle of the Bishop of Hildesheim (Note: The ghost/spirit haunted Stift Hildesheim (seat of the Prince-Bishopric of Hildesheim Hochstift Hildesheim?)) retaliated against a kitchen boy who splashed filthy water on it (Cf. fig. top right), by leaving the lad's dismembered body cooking in a pot. Similarly, according to an anecdote recorded by historian Thomas Kantzow (d. 1542), in 1327, the resident Chimmeken of Mecklenburg Castle allegedly chopped up a kitchen boy into pieces after he took and drank the milk offered to the sprite.

The story of the "multi-formed" Hinzelmann (Grimms DS No. 75) (Note: The Grimms abridge the single printed source, Der vielförmige Hintzelmann, Feldmann (1704).) features a typical house sprite tidying the kitchen and repaying insolence. Though normally invisible, it is a shapeshifter as its name suggests. When the lord of Hudemühlen Castle fled to Hanover, the sprite transformed into a feather to follow the horse carriage. It also appeared as a marten and serpent after attempts at expelling it.

A kobold by the similar name Heintzlein (Heinzlein) was recorded by Martin Luther. (Note: Luther's child spirit originally called Heintzlein or Heinzlein but altered to "Heinzchen" in Heine. The name is given as Heinzlin" by Grimm's DM, citing the 1577 edition of Luther.) Although a group of house sprite names (Heinz, Heinzel, Heinzchen, Heinzelman, Hinzelman, Hinzemännchen, etc.) are considered to derive from the diminutive pet name of "Heinrich", the name Hinzelmann goes deeper, and alludes to the spirit appearing in the guise of a cat, the name Hinz[e] being an archetypical name for cats. Also Hinzelmann and Heinzelmänchen of Cologne are considered different house sprites altogether with the latter categorized as one of "literary" nature. The house sprite names Chim, Chimken, Chimmeken, etc. are diminutive informal names of Joachim.

The true form of a kobold is often said to be that of a small child, sometimes only confirmed by the touch of the hand, but sometimes a female servant eager to see it is shown a dead body of a child (cf. Hinzelmann). It was believed in some regions, e.g. Vogtland, that the kobold was the soul of a child who died unbaptized. The Grimms (Deutsche Sagen) supported the notion of "kobold" appearing as a child wearing a pretty jacket, but Jacob Grimm (Deutsche Mythologie) stated contrarily that kobolds are red-haired and red-bearded, without examples. Later commentators noted that the house sprite Petermännchen has a long, white beard. The Klabautermann is red-haired and white-bearded according to a published source. (Note: Additional examples exist if the bergmännlein (mountain, or mine spirits) are admitted as "kobolds".)

The kobold often wears red, pointed hats, a widely disseminated mark of European household spirits under other names such as the Norwegian nisse; the North or Northeastern German kobolds named Niss or Puk (cog. puck) are prone to wearing such caps. The combined form Nis Puk is also known. In the north, the house sprite may be known by the dragon-like name drak, said to appear in a form like a fire shaft.

Sometimes household sprites manifest as noisemakers (poltergeists). They may first rattle, then speak invisibly, and then do chores, gradually making their presence and personality more clear (see Hintzelmann tale). In some regions, the kobold is held to be the soul of a prematurely killed child (§ True identity as child's ghost).

They may be hard to eradicate, but it is often said that a gift of an article of clothing will cause them to leave. (Note: Stith-Thompson's motif index F405.11. "House spirit leaves when gift of clothing is left for it".) (Note: Clothing to the schretzchen of Kremnitzmühle) (Note: Slippers to the heugütel (heigidle) of Erzgebirge/Vogtland.)

The Klopfer is a "noisemaker" or poltergeist type of kobold name, while the poppele and butz (which Grimm and others considered to be noise-inspired) are classed as names referring to a doll or figurine.

The name kobold itself might be classed in this "doll" type group as the earliest instances of use of the word kobold in 13th-century Middle High German refer jokingly to figurines made of wood or wax, and the word presumably also meant "household spirit" in MHG (Note: Since it is only attested only as "idolum" (in one of Diefenbach's sources), etc. among MHG glosses. But the Anglo-Saxon form cofgodu glossed as "penates" (household deity) bolsters the possibility that kobolt or some MHG cognate form corresponded to it.) and certainly something of a "household deity" in the post-medieval period (gloss dated 1517). (Note: Trochus, Balthasar (1517), page A5 reads "lares foci sunt vulgo kobelte" as requoted in Grimms DW "Kobold" III. 2). Lares being household or hearth goddesses. The same work has an entry for "Lares/Penates", pp. O5–O6, discussing the household sacred beings using a mix of German, and including mention of Hutchen as a small shack or hutch.)

The etymology of kobold that Grimm supported derived the word from Latin cobalus (Greek κόβαλος, kobalos), but this was also Georg Agricola's Latin/Greek cypher for kobel syn. Bergmännlein denoting mine spirits, i.e. gnome. (Note: Agricola De Animantibus subterraneis, Eng. tr., compared with Latin-German gloss to the work.) This Greek etymology has been superseded by the Germanic one explaining the word as the compound kob/kof 'house, chamber' + walt 'power, authority' (cf. cobalt#etymology).

The gütel has a variant heugütel, a hayloft or stable kobold, which tampers with horses.

== Nomenclature ==
The "kobold" is defined as the well-known household spirit, descended from household gods and hearth deities, according to Grimm's dictionary. (Note: Grimm DW "kobold", I gives definition, III gives origins.)

However, Middle High German "kóbolt, kobólt" is defined as "wooden or waxen figures of a nixie-ish (neckische) house spirit", used in jest.

=== Kobold as generic household spirit ===
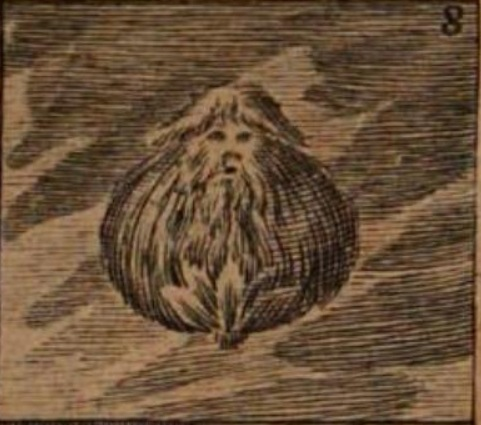
Household spirit, kobold, or gütgen ―engraving by Thomas Cross, Sr. (fl. 1632–1682), frontispiece to Praetorius (1668) [1666] Anthropodemus Plutonicus.

The term "kobold" was used as a general or generic term for "house spirit" known by other names even before Grimm, e.g., Erasmus Francisci (1690) who discusses the hütchen tale under the section on "Kobold". (Note: Francisi is one of the sources for Grimm's DS No. 74 Hütchen.) The book Hintzelmann (published 1701, second edition 1704) was an expanded work on the topic by an anonymous author, based on the older-dated diaries of Pastor Feldmann (fl. 1584–1589) which also used "kobold" and "poltergeist" in commentary, but this cannot be considered an independent source since the book also cites Erasmus Francisci elsewhere. Both these were primary sources for the kobold tales in Grimms' Deutsche Sagen, No. 74, 75.

Praetorius (1666) discussed the household spirit under such names as Hausmann (dat. pl. haußmännern [sic]), kobold, gütgen, and Latin equivalents.

=== Glossed sources ===
A relatively late vocabularius by Trochus (1517) gives kobelte glossed as the common "vulgar" term for the Roman house and hearth deities "Lares" (and Penates). A later work by Kaspar von Stieler (1705) glosses "kobold" as "Spiritus familiaris", i.e., "household spirit".

While the term "kobold" is attested in Middle High German glossaries, they indicate the word was not necessarily used strictly in the sense of "house spirit". The terms kobult together with bancstichil, alp, more to gloss procubus (≈incubus) in Diefenbach's source (Breslauer's Vocabularius, 1340) (Note: Cited in Lexer, "kobolt".) may (?) suggest "kobold" being regarded more like an alp and mare which are dream demons.

But indications are that these Germanic household deities were current in the older periods, attested by Anglo-Saxon cofgodu (glossed "penates") and Old Frankish and Old High German: hûsing, herdgota for house or hearth deities also glossed as penates. (Note: Old High German hûsing is glossed as Latin penates in Notker, cited by Grimm.)

Middle High German location spirit stetewalden

There is an attestation to a kobold-like name for a house or location spirit, given as stetewalden by Frater Rudolfus of the 13th century, meaning "ruler of the site" (genius loci).

==== Ur-origins ====
Otto Schrader (1908) also observed that the "cult of the hearth-fire" developed into "tutelary house deities, localized in the home"; he also reckoned that the German kobold and the Greek agathós daímōn both followed this evolutionary path. (Note: Schrader (2003) [1908], p. 24 also quoted by Olesen (2012), but the latter appears to be synthesis and not direct quoting.) (Note: Also repeated in other sources such as MacLaren and Dowden (2000))

=== Kobold as doll ===
There are no attested uses of the word "kobold" (Middle High German: kobolt) prior to the 13th century. Grimm opines that earlier uses may have existed but remain undiscovered or lost. (Note: If there were attested OHG forms, they would not need to be reconstructed.)

The earliest known uses of the word kobold in 13th century Middle High German refer jokingly to figurines made of wood or wax. The exemplum in Konrad von Würzburg's poem (<1250) refers to a man as worthless as a kobold doll made from boxwood. (Note: Konrad's poem above seems to be a more complicated double metaphor to the luhs (Luchs, "lynx", conceived of as a hybrid of fox and wolf, and therefore unable to breed) deriding someone as reproductively sterile and deceitful, just like a kobold doll.)

This use does not directly support the notion of the kobold being regarded as a spirit or deity. The scenario conjectured by Grimm (seconded by Karl Simrock in 1855) was that home sprites used to be carved from wood or wax and set up in the house as objects of earnest veneration, but as time progressed, they degraded into humorous or entertaining pieces of décor. (Note: Simrock: "zuletzt mehr zum Scherz oder zur Zierde lately more as joke or for decor")

==== Stringed puppet ====
The kobolt and Tatrmann were also boxwood puppets manipulated by wires, which performed in puppet theater in the medieval period, as evident from example usage. The traveling juggler (German: Gaukler) of yore used to make a kobold doll appear out of its coats and make faces with it to entertain the crowd.

Thomas Keightley comments that legends and folklore about kobolds can be explained as "ventriloquism and the contrivances of servants and others".

The 17th century expression to laugh like a kobold may refer to these dolls with their mouths wide open, and it may mean "to laugh loud and heartily".

==== Dumb doll insult ====
There are other medieval literary examples using kobold or tatrmann as a metaphor for mute or dumb human beings. (Note: Other examples: Satire of the clergy as "wooden bishop", or "wooden sexton". A man in silence is likened to a mute doll, hence the comparison of a kobold struck dumb and the wooden bishop (citing Mîsnaere in Amgb (Altes meistergesangbuch in Myllers sammlung) 48^{a}). A man hearing confession compared to kobold, in a Fastnachtspiel.)

Note that some of the kobold synonyms are specifically classified as Kretinnamen, under the slander for stupidity category in the HdA, as aforementioned.

== Etymology ==
The kobalt etymology as consisting of kob "chamber" + walt "ruler, power, authority", with the meaning of "household spirit" has been advanced by various authors, as early as Christian W. M. Grein (1861–1864) who postulated a form *kobwalt, quoted in Grimms' dictionary. (Note: Grein, Christian W. M. (1861–1864) Sprachschaß der angelsächsischen Dichter 1: 167, quoted also in Grimms DW "Kobold" III. 2).) Other writers such as Müller-Fraureuth (1906) also weighed in on the question of its etymology. (Note: Also Glasenapp (1911) surveys the etymological considerations, and Kretschmer (1928) weighing in on kobold vs. gnome (mine spirit) names (virunculus montanos, etc.) as cited elsewhere.)

Other linguists, such as Schrader (1908) suggested ancestral (Old High German) *kuba-walda "the one who rules the house". Dowden (2002) offers the hypothetical precursor *kofewalt.

The kob/kub/kuf- root is possibly related to Old Norse/Icelandic: kofe "chamber", or Old High German: chubisi "house", and the English word "cove" in the sense of 'shelter'. (Note: Müller-Fraureuth (1906) wrote that the form kobe survives in modern German "Schweinekoben", meaning "pig stall", and that the true original etymology contained the stem -Hold as a name for "demon".) (Note: Yiddish linguist Paul Wexler (2002), discussing German hold "beautiful" tangentially notes the etymology of kobold could derive from koben "pigsty" + hold "stall spirit". He also suggests -Hold for demon and "Holle" may be grouped as related terms, and notes pre-Christian tradition of girls offering twisted knots of hair to Frau Holle; in the subsequent entry he notes twisted bread (challah bread) may have something to do with Frau Holle, but this origin is masked by using a spelling suggestive of Hebrew origins.)

This is now accepted as the standard etymology. Even though the Grimm brothers were aware of it, (Note: Namely through Grein (1861–1864), which the Grimms knew and quoted for the etymology of kobolt as "hauses walten" in the Grimms' dictionary entry for "Kobold", II b).) Jacob Grimm seemingly endorsed a different etymology (§ Grimm's alternate etymology), though this eventually got displaced.

=== Grimm's alternate etymology ===
Jacob Grimm in Teutonic Mythology gave the etymology of kobold/kobolt as a word derived from Latin cobalus (pl. cobali) or rather its antecedent Greek kobalos (pl. kobaloi; Ancient Greek: Κόβαλος, plural: Κόβαλοι) meaning "joker, trickster". (Note: Although Grimm's Teutonic Mythology glossed the word cobalus as "Schalk" and this got translated as 'rogue', Liddell and Scott actually gives "impudent rogue, arrant knave", which is pointed out as being dated: here, "joker" would be appropriate in present-day colloquy. Others suggest "trickster".) (Note: Aristotle describes an owl as both a mime and a kobalos ("trickster"). Older German-English dictionaries define Schalk as "rogue" or "wag", again, dated terms, whereas "scamp, joker" is given by a later linguist. Glasenapp believed cobalus meant a professional joker, buffoon, or sycophant.) (Note: Grimm also characterizes kobold as a "tiny tricky home-sprite" and comments at length on its laughter. Note that the cobali are described as having the habit to "mimic men", "laugh with glee, pretend to do much but really do nothing", and "throw pebbles at the workmen" doing no real harm.) The final -olt he explained as a typical German suffix for monsters and supernaturals.

The derivation of kobold from Greek kobalos is not original to Grimm, and he credits Ludwig Wachler (1737). (Note: Grimm, DW "kobold" III 1) and III 2) b), He also acknowledges Cornelis Kilian [1574] dated earlier, though technically that was an etymological solution for "kabouter-manneken" derived from cobalus/κόβαλος.)

Thus, the generic "goblin" is a cognate of "kobold" according to Grimm's etymology and perhaps even a descendant word deriving from "kobold". The Dutch kabout, kabot, kabouter, kaboutermanneken, etc. were also regarded as deriving from cabolus by Grimm, citing Dutch linguist Cornelis Kiliaan. (Note: KKiliaan, Cornelis (1574) cited by Grimms DW "Kobold" III 3) b) c))

==== Conflation with mine spirit ====
Jacob Grimm certainly knew that kobel and Bergmännlein (=Bergmännchen (Note: -lein, -chen are the commonest German diminutives)) were the proper terms Agricola used for "mine spirits" since his Deutsche Mythologie quoted these terms from Georgius Agricola (16th cent.) in the annotation volume. (Note: The source was Agricola's De animatibus (1549), but Grimm attributed it to a different work, de re metallica Libri XII due to confusion. Basically Agricola wrote in Latin any German terms were Latinized or Graecized (thus "cobalos").) So to know the actual German terms ("kobel"), one needed to consult the glossary. The glossary was later attached to a 1657 omnibus edition consisting of an excerpt of De animatibus added to de re metallica in XII books, which is clearly the Basel 1657 edition Grimm is citing.

But Grimms' dictionary, while admitting that the mine spirit went by the name kobel, considered that word merely to be a variant or offshoot of kobold (for the house spirit). The dictionary stated under "kobold" that kobel must be a diminutive cognate Nebenform. (Note: Grimms DW "kobold", III. ursprung, nebenformen, 3) a) gives among the Nebenname kobel, regarding it as a diminutive.) And under "kobalt" it considered the name of cobalt ore derived from the supposed mischief caused by the kobold or Bergmännchen (mountain manikin, mountain spirit) in these mines.

Thus, unsurprisingly, later writers have continued referring to mine spirits as "kobolds" or considered "kobold" to be both house spirit and mine spirit in a wider sense (Note: e.g., Brewer's Dictionary of Phrase and Fable, spiritualist Emma Hardinge Britten) (cf. § Literary references, § Fantasy novels and anime). At any rate, it is recognized that the original "house spirit" kobold got conflated with the "mine spirit" also known as kobel. (Note: As recapped by German linguist Paul Kretschmer (1928). The conflation occurred when the original sense of kobold as "house spirit" (Hausgeist) which had been faithful to the "standard" etymology (koben "chamber' + walt "ruler, power, authority") was later corrupted by the sense of "mine spirits" (which had names like "mountain manikin"), undergoing a meaning shift.)

===== Visitors from mines =====
Spiritualist Emma Hardinge Britten (1884) recorded a story about "kobolds" in the mines who communicated with local German residents (of Harz Mountains?) using banging sounds and fulfilled the promise to visit their homes. Extracted as real-life experience from a Mrs. Kalodzky, who was visiting peasants named Dorothea and Michael Engelbrecht. (Note: On the three first days after our arrival, we only heard a few dull knocks, sounding in and about the mouth of the mine, as if produced by some vibrations or very distant blows...") As promised, these kobolds appeared in the house in shadow as small human-like figures "more like a little image carved out of black shining wood". (Note: We were about to sit down to tea when Mdlle. Gronin called our attention to the steady light, round, and about the size of a cheese plate, which appeared suddenly on the wall of the little garden directly opposite the door of the hut in which we sat. Before any of us could rise to examine it, four more lights appeared almost simultaneously, about the same shape, and varying only in size. Surrounding each one was the dim outline of a small human figure, black and grotesque, more like a little image carved out of black shining wood, than anything else I can liken them to. Dorothea kissed her hands to these dreadful little shapes, and Michael bowed with great reverence. As for me and my companions, we were so awe-struck yet amused at these comical shapes, that we could not move or speak until they themselves seemed to flit about in a sort of wavering dance, and then vanish, one by one.) (Note: For Further description of "mine kobolds" aka Berggeist[er] given by Britten, cf. Gnome#Communication through noises.) The informant claims she and her husband (Note: Mr. Kalodzky, who taught at the Hungarian School of Mines.) have both seen the beings since and described them as "diminutive black dwarfs about two or three feet in height, and at that part which in the human being is occupied by the heart, they carry the round luminous circle" and the sighting of the circle is more common than the dwarfish beings.

== Subtypes ==
=== Other house spirits ===
Kobold or Hausgeist names in Germany, by categories (sample) (Note: Compare published map by Schäfer et al. (2000))

A. [Doll] Güttel, Poppele.
B. [Cretin] Schretzelein
C. a) [Apparel] Hüdeken b) [Beastform] Hinzelmann, Kazten-veit
D. [Noise] Klopfer
E. [Person name] Chimmeken Woltken, Chimken Niß-Puk (Note: Niss is categorized E "pet name", while Puck is considered G. "devil name" by the HdA.)
G. [Demon] Puk
H. [Literary] Heinzelmänchen
I. [Dragon] Drak. Alrun

= "mine spirit".

The term kobold has slipped into becoming a generic term translatable as goblin, so that all manner of household spirits (hausgeister) became classifiable as "types" of kobold. Such alternate names for the kobold house sprite are classified by type of naming (A. As doll, B. As pejoratives for stupidity, C. Appearance-based, D. Characteristics-based, E. Diminutive pet name based, etc.) in the Handwörterbuch des deutschen Aberglaubens (HdA). (Note: The remaining categories are: F. Rufname (proper first name) G. Devil-name (incl. Puck) H. Literary name (e.g. Gesamtname), I. Dragon name (incl. Alf, Alber, Drak, Alrun, Tragerl, Herbrand K. Different names (Mönch).)

A geographical map of Germany labeled with the different regional appellations has appeared in a 2020 publication.

Grimm, after stating that the list of kobold (or household spirits) in German lore can be long also adds the names Hütchen and Heinzelmann.

=== Doll or puppet names ===
The term kobold in its earliest usage suggests it to be a wooden doll (Cf. § Origins under § Doll or idol below). A synonym for kobold in that sense includes Tatrmann which is also attested in the medieval period.

What is clear based on 13th century writings is that these kobold dolls were puppets used in plays and by travelling showmen. They were also known as tatrmann and described as manipulated by wires. Either way, the idol or puppet was invoked rhetorically in writing by the minstrels, etc. to mock clergymen or other people. (Note: The Handwörterbuch des deutschen Aberglaubens assigns kobold synonyms separately as A. doll names and B. names for deriding an imbecile, but comments that the A type names served as B type pejoratives.)

The household spirit names poppele and butz were thought by Grimm to derive from noise-making, but the HdA considers them to be doll names. The poppele is thought to be the German word Puppe for doll. The term Butz meanwhile could refer to a "tree trunk", and by extension "overgrown", "little", or "stupid", and thus is cross-categorized as an example of "cretin names" (category B). Ranke suggests the meaning of Klotz ("klutz, hunk of wood") or a "small being" with "noisemaker ghost" as a possible descent from MHG bôzen "to beat, strike".

While the MHG dictionary defines Butze as a "knocking [-noisemaking] kobold", poltergeist, or frightening form, Grimm thinks that all MHG usage treats butze as a type of bogey or scarecrow (Popanz und Vogelscheuch). So in some sense, Butz[e] is simply a generic bogeyman (German: Butzemann). And butz[e], while nominally a kobold (house spirit), is almost a generic term for all kinds of spectres in the Alps region.

The East Central German name gütel or güttel (diminutive of "god", i.e. "little god", var. heugütel) has been suggested as a kobold synonym of the fetish figurine type. Grimm knew the term but placed the discussion of it under the "Wild man of the woods" section conjecturing the use of güttel as synonymous to götze (i.e., sense of 'idol') in medieval heroic legend. (Note: Wolfdietrich, Str. 590, in von der Hagen (1855) edition Heldenbuch, Vol. 1, p. 236. Cited by Grimm & Stallybrass tr. (1888), 1: 483.) (Note: Grimm (1878), 4: 139 only has: "ein guttel (? götze). Wolfdietr. in Hagens heldenb. s. 236". But Grimm mentions götze elsewhere as 'idol' (Grimm (1875), 1: 12, 86 and Grimm & Stallybrass tr. (1883), 1: 513, citing Sommer (1846), pp. 38, 173 （"33. Das Jesuskind im alten Hospital zu Halle" and endnote） where it is evidently a dress-up baby Jesus doll. Sommer's endnote makes connection with the custom of bathing the alrune doll (Cf. § Mandrake root dolls and dressing it up in white shirt.)) The term gütel answers to Agricola's guteli (in Latin) as an alternate common name for the mine spirit (bergmännlein).

==== Mandrake root dolls ====
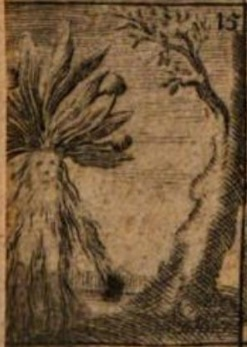
Plant-people, Alraun (mandrake) ―engraving by Thomas Cross, Sr. (fl. 1632–1682), frontispiece to Praetorius (1668) [1666] Anthropodemus Plutonicus.

The HdA categorizes Alrune as a dragon name. In English, "mandrake" is easily seen as a "-drake" or "dragon" name. In German, a reference needs to be made to the Latin form mandragora where -dragora came to be regarded as meaning a dragon.

Since the mandrake does not natively grown in Germany, the so-called Alrune dolls were manufactured out of the available roots such as bryony of the gourd family, gentian, and tormentil (Blutwurz). The lore surrounding them is thus more like a charm whose possession brought luck and fortune, supposedly through the agency of some spirit, rather than a house-haunting kobold. The alraun doll was also known by names such as glücksmännchen (generic name for such dolls) and galgenmännlein. It is a mistake to consider such alraun dolls as completely equivalent to the kobold, the household spirit, in Grimm's opinion. (Note: "The alraun[e] or gallowsmannikin (German: Galgenmännlein) in Grimms (1816) Deutsche Sagen nos. 83 84 is not properly a kobold, but a semi-diabolic being carved out of a root".)

But the kobold kind known as Alrune (alrûne) did indeed exist locally in the folklore of the north, in Saterland, Lower Saxony. (Note: Strackerjan (1867) No. 265. According to No. 264, "Alrun" is a special type of "kobold" (though this is not current in the Oldenburg area).) Alrune was also recognized as a kobold-name in Friesland, and even Switzerland. (Note: Thorpe cites Grimm's DM so he realizes this is a term for a plant root (kräuzer).) (Note: In the south, "Heinzelmännchen" confusingly carries the different meaning of mandrake root (German: Alraun, Alraunwurzel). Perhaps this explains why Arrowsmith lists mandrake names (Allerünken, Alraune, Galgenmännlein) as synonyms for kobold in the south.)

=== Cretin names ===
The aforementioned butz may allude to a wooden object, or a "dolt" by extension. The Schrat (Schratte) is also formally categorized as a "cretin name" type of kobold nomenclature in the HdA. However, the term Schrat and its variants have remained current in the sense of "house spirit" only in certain parts such as "southeast Germany": more specifically northern Bavaria including the Upper Palatinate, Fichtel Mountains, Vogtland (into Thuringia), and Austria (Styria and Carinthia) according to the various sources the HdA cites.

The tale "Schrätel und wasserbär" (kobold and polar bear) had been recorded in Middle High German, and is recognized as a "genuine" kobold tale. The tale is set in Denmark, whose king received the gift of a polar bear and lodges at a peasant's house infested by a "schretel". But it is driven away by the ferocious bear, which the spirit thinks is a "big cat". Obviously Scandinavian origin is suspected, with the Norwegian version retaining the polar bear which turns into other beasts in Central European variants. Old Norse/Icelandic skratti meaning "sorcerer, giant" has been listed as a cognate form.

There exists a version of this water-bear tale, set in Bad Berneck im Fichtelgebirge, Upper Franconia, where a holzfräulein has been substituted for the schrätel, and the haunting occurs at a miller's, and the "big cat" dispatching the spirit. Still, the forms schrezala and schretselein seemed to be current around Fichtelgebirge (Fichtel Mountains), or at least in Upper Franconia region as a sprite haunting a house or stable. (Note: Zapf (1874), p. 38 cited by Ranke in HdA, p. 1289 note 54), as Zapf p. 43.) The schrezala form is recognized in Vogtland also.

Thus schretzelein is marked in Upper Franconia (around Hof, Bavaria) in the location map above, based on additional sources. (Note: The tale of schretzelein is sourced from höfische Chronik Hof, Bavaria in Köhlers's anthology of Vogtand lore.) (Note: "Das Schrezelein in Hartungs" is set in Hartungs, Hof (district), Upper Franconia. It haunts a horse's stable.) A schretzchen reputedly haunted a household at Kremnitzmühle near Teuschnitz, Upper Franconia, and tended to cattle, washed the dishes, and put out the fire. But when the mistress of the house well-intendedly gave the gift of clothing to the spirit who looked like a six-year old ragamuffin, it exclaimed it had been now been given payment and must now leave. However, the forms schrägele, schragerln are marked in Upper Franconia and schretzelein in Lower Franconia on Schäfer et al.'s map.

Forms of schrat as kobold also occur in Poland as skrzat, glossed in a c. 1500 dictionary as a household spirit (duchy rodowe), also known by variant skrot. (Note: Brückner's Polish dictionary cited by Ranke, note 34)) The Czech forms (standardized as škrat, škrátek, škrítek) could mean a kobold, but could also denote a "mine spirit" or a hag. (Note: Grimm points to Czech skřet, skřjtek glossed as penas somewhere, justifying "kobold" meaning. However, Brückner gives Czech skrátek, szkrzítek as "hag, baba" (jędzy) or "mine spirit" (duchu-górniku). and the extrapolation of latter by Ranke to "gold-bringing devil" (Gold bringender Teufel) would appear to require additional sources. The standardized forms škrat, škrátek, škrítek are not in the given sources, and occurs, e.g., in Josef Jungmann's Czech-German dictionaries that also identifies Czech-Latin glosses.)

=== Pet names ===
There is a roster of names of kobolds or little folk derived from shortened affectionate forms of human names, including Chimken (Joachim), Wolterken (Walter), Niss (Nils).

While Hinz, Hinzelmann, Heinz are categorized as C subtype "beast-shape names" (cat-shape names) in the HdA (Cf. § Cat-shape, below), (Note: Weiser-Aall, "kobold", citing as 39) her own paper.)

The HdA does not explicitly include the child-sprite Heintzlein (Heinzlein) mentioned by Martin Luther in his Table Talk, which turns out to be the spirit of the unwanted child murdered by its mother (a motif seen by kobolds elsewhere). This spirit is renamed "Heinzchen" in Heine's exposition, and perhaps also in Grimm's Deutsche Sagen No. 71 as well.

Grimm also lists other variant spellings (heinzelman, hinzelman, hinzemännchen) to be considered together. Grimm's commentary then mentions Heinze as a mountain sprite (Berggeist, gnome) in Rollenhagen's Froschmeuseler, Heinze being a diminutive (or rather more properly the affectionate shortened forms, or hypocorism) of Heinrich.

The kobold Heinzelmännchen (another diminutive of Heinrich) is particularly associated with Cologne, is actually separated out as a "Category H Literary name" in the HdA, apparently regarded as a late literary invention or reconstruction. (Note: Weiser-Aall seems to regard it as August Kopisch's literary work, but the oral origins were published by Ernst Weyden (1826). Marianne Rumpf (1976) argued Kopisch relied almost completely on Weyden, though the tacit assumptions made have been questioned by Heribert A. Hilgers. Hilgers states the "restoration" of the Heinzelmännchen-story to have been begun by 1821 by Weyden.) The Heinzelmännchen is also clearly distinguished from the Hinzelmann in current scholarship, according to modern linguist Elmar Seebold, though they may have been interchangeably discussed in the past. Accordingly, a mix of heinzelman, hinzelman" were given as "pet name (shortened human name)" type of kobold names by Grimm, (cf. § Heinzelmännchen below and the daughter article Heinzelmännchen).

Chimke (var. Chimken, Chimmeken), diminutive of Joachim is a Low German for a poltergeist; the story of "Chimmeken" dates to c. 1327 and was recorded in Thomas Kantzow's Pomeranian chronicle (cf. § Offerings and retributions). Chimgen (Kurd Chimgen (Note: Praetorius gives "Court Chimgen", transliterated as "Kurd Chimgen" by the Grimms DS No. 71 Heine in the original German quotes "lieb Chimchen", though translated "dear Chimgen".)), and Chim are other forms. (Note: Possibly East Prussian.) (Note: Attested by Prateorius, but since his concern was with the legend of Rübezahl, one would assume he is discussing house spirits generally of that area.) (Note: "Chim", "Kurt Chimgen", "Himschen", "Heinzchen" were what German and Alsatian cooks (Alsace-Lorraine was territory annexed to Germany from after the Franco-Prussian War to WWII.) call their kitchen kobolds by, according to Saintine.)

Wolterken, also Low German, is diminutive for Walther, and another piece of household spirit of the pet name type, Wolterken glossed as "lares" and attested together with "chimken" and "hußnißken" in Samuel Meiger (1587) Panurgia lamiarum. (Note: Paraphrased by Mullenhoff, where Meiger is identified as being pastor at Nortorf.) (Note: Classified as "E. pet name (German:Kosenamen)" type names in the HdA.)

Nis (Niß) is also explained to be a northern pet name for Nils.

=== Apparel names ===
Under the classification of household spirit names based on appearance, a subcategory collects names based on apparel, especially the hat (classification C. a), under which are listed Hütchen, Timpehut, Langhut, etc. and even Hellekeplein, (Note: Praetorius (1666), p. 360; Praetorius (1668), p. 312: "Gütchen/Wichtlichen/Erdmännrichen/Hellekeplein", via Kluge (1894) Etymlog. Wörterbuch, "Heinzelmannchen", cited from another edition by Weiser-All, note 35).) which is one of the names of a cap or cloak of invisibility. To this group belongs the Low Saxon form hôdekin (Low German: Hödekin) of the house sprite Hütchen from Hildesheim, which wears a felt hat (Latin: pileus). (Note: Praetorius explains that the sprite "on account of the hat he wears on his head is called pileatum, or Hödekin in the speech of Saxony". Wyl gives mistyped "Pilateum" [sic] and glosses it as deriving from adj. pilleatus thus meaning Filzkappe "Felt Cap". Grimm DS No. 74 also gives Filz-Hut, from one of the sources, i.e. Johann Weyer.) Grimm also adds the names Hopfenhütel, Eisenhütel.

=== Cat-shape ===
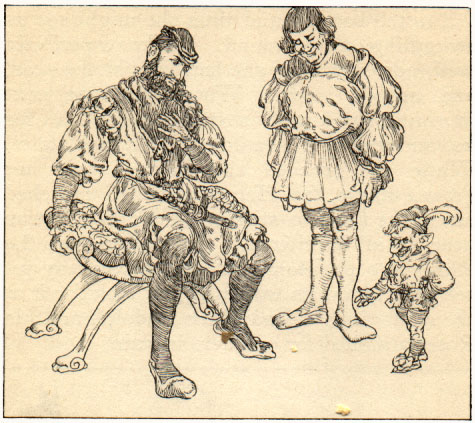
Hinzelmann was a kobold who haunted Hudemühlen Castle. ―Willy Pogány illustr. (1912), "The Little White Feather" in The Fairies and the Christmas Child ed. Gask

The kobold Hinzelmann or Hintzelmann is completely distinguishable from the "literary" kobold Heinzelmännchen according to modern scholarship (cf. § Heinzelmännchen).

And while the name Heinzelmann (Heinzelmännchen) is forged from diminutives of Heinrich, more importantly, the names Hinzelmann, Heinzelman (or Hinzelman, Hinzemännchen, etc.) are names alluding to the kobold's frequent cat-like shape or transformation, and categorized Under type C "Appearance-based", subtype "beast-shape based names" in the HdA. The analysis is expounded upon by Jacob Grimm, who notes that Hinze was the name of the cat in the Reineke (German version of Reynard the Fox) so it was the common pet name for cats. Thus hinzelman, hinzemännchen are recognized as cat-based names, to be grouped with katermann (from kater "tom cat") which may be a precursor to tatermann.

The katzen-veit named after a cat is categorized by Grimm as a "wood sprite", but also discussed under kobold, and classed as a "cat appearance" type kobold name (category C b) in HdA. Grimm localized the katzen-veit at Fichtelberg, and Praetorius also recognized this as the lore of the Vogtland region, though Praetorius's work published (1692) under the pseudonym Lustigero Wortlibio claims katzen-veit to be a famous "cabbage spirit" in the Hartzewalde (in Elbingerode, now part of Oberharz am Brocken in the Harz mountains, cf. map).

The Hitzelmann that haunted Hudemühlen Castle in Lower Saxony was described at length by Pastor Feldmann Der vielförmige Hintzelmann (1704). As the title suggests, this Hinzelmann was a varied and multifaceted shapeshifter, transforming into a white feather, or a marten, or a serpent. (cf. § Animal form).

The kobold appears in the guise of a cat to eat the panada bribe, in Saintine's version.

=== Poltergeists ===
The HdA's category D consists of kobold names from their behavioural characteristics, and other than some non-German sprites discussed, these are mainly the poltergeists, or noise-making spirits (otherwise, they are names derived after their favourite dish, cf. § Milk-lovers below). The poltergeists include the klopfer ("knocker"), hämmerlein, etc.

Some poltergeists had been assumed to be named after their noise-making nature in the past, but HdA re-categorized them otherwise as puppet names. So rather than taking poppele to be a form of Puppe "doll", Grimm argued that the poltergeist pophart (or popart) (Note: Pophart/Popart was a "Klopfgeist" accord. Johann Fischart's translation of Gargantua, 25.) and poppele (regionally also popel, pöpel, pöplemann, popanz, etc.) were related to verb popern meaning to 'soft-knock or thump repeatedly' (or popeln, boppeln "noisemaking"), with a side meaning of a 'muffled (masked, covered-up) ghost to frighten children'.

Likewise, though Grimm thought butz was reference to noise, even though butz seems to refer to a "tree trunk" and thus, had been classed as A for doll-name by HdA.

Rumpelstilzchen of Grimms' KHM No. 55 (as well as the Rumpelstilt mentioned by Johann Fischart (Note: Fischart (1577) mentions "Popart" and "Rumpele stilt" as a children's game.)) are discussed as a poltergeist type of kobold by Grimm as well, though not formally admitted under this poltergeist category of kobold names in the HdA. The name Rumpelstilts is composed of Rumpel meaning "(crumpled) noise" and Stilz, Stilt with several meanings such as "stilts", a pair of poles used as extension of legs.

=== Milk-lovers ===
In category D, there are names deriving from their favorite food being the bowl of milk, namely napfhans ("Potjack")and the Swiss beckli meaning "milk vat" (cf. § Offerings and retributions).

=== Heinzelmännchen ===
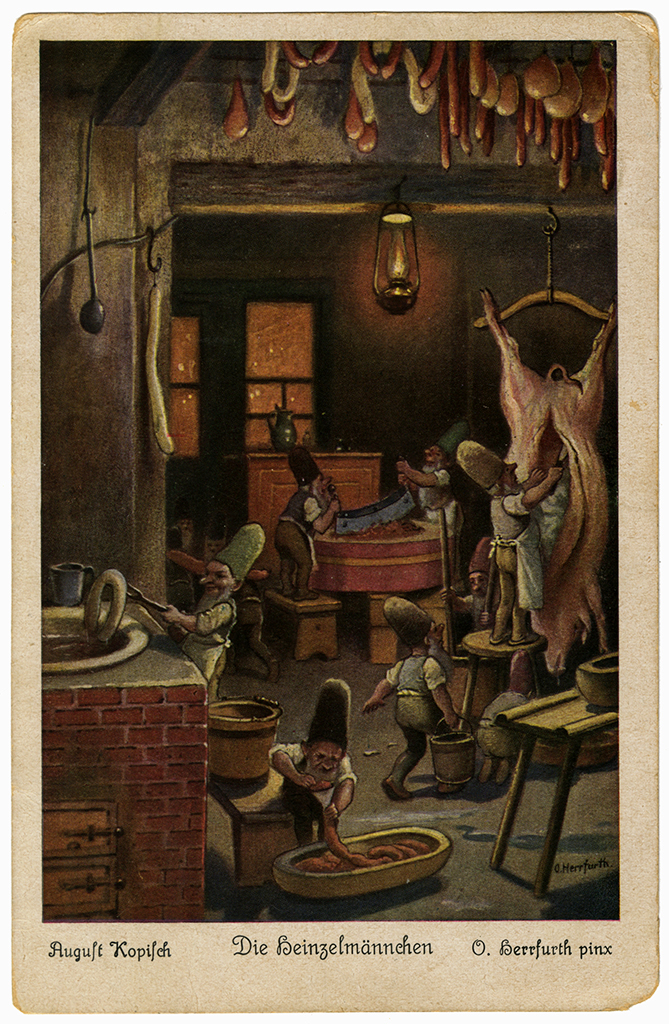
Heinzelmännchen —Herrfurth, Oskar (1926 or earlier)

The Heinzelmännchen of Cologne resemble short, naked men. Like typical house sprites, they were said to perform household chores such as baking bread, laundry, etc. But they remained beyond sight of humans. According to Ernst Weyden (1826), bakers in the city until the late 18th century never needed hired help because, each night, the kobolds known made as much bread as a baker could need. However, the people of the various shops could not suppress their curiosity at seeing them, and schemed to see them. A tailor's wife strewed peas on the stairs to trip up and hope to see them. Such endeavors caused the sprites to disappear from all the shops in Cologne, before around the year 1780. (Note: The opening lines in Weyden (1826) suggests the Heinzelmännchen were present less than fifty years ago (translated by Keightley in 1828). The regression (subtraction of dates) is made by Heribert A. Hilgers (2001a) who states that the "origins of Cologne's Heinzelmännchen before 1826 (or before 1780) remains in the dark.)

This house sprite is included as kobold, but is considered a literary retelling, based on the fact the knowledge about the sprite had been spread by August Kopisch's ballad (1836).

=== Miscellaneous ===
Other house spirits categorized as "K. Other names" by the HdA are mönch, herdmannl, schrackagerl. The mönch lore is widespread from Saxony to Bavaria.

King Goldemar, king of dwarfs, is also re-discussed under the household spirit commentary by Grimm, presumably because he became a guest to the human king Neveling von Hardenberg at his Castle Hardenstein for three years, making a dwarf sort of a household spirit on a limited-term basis.

For cognate beings of kobolds or house spirits in non-German cultures, see § Parallels.

=== Sea kobolds ===
Also known as Klaubautermann, these sea kobolds live on boats and help the humans who inhabit them. These helpful tasks include pumping water, organizing cargo, and repairing things around the ship. When they are visible they take on a human shape and can be seen wearing yellow hats and red or gray jackets. As long as they feel respected, sea kobolds will remain helpful.

It's considered a bad omen by the captains of ships if they see a sea kobold before departure, and may delay departure if they see one. While sea kobolds are considered to be helpful, if a ship is already sinking, they will leave the ship behind.

== Characteristics ==
The kobold is linked to a specific household. Some legends claim that every house has a resident kobold, regardless of its owners' desires or needs. The means by which a kobold enters a new home vary from tale to tale.

Should someone take pity on a kobold in the form of a cold, wet creature and take it inside to warm it, the spirit takes up residence there. A tradition from Perleberg in northern Germany says that a homeowner must follow specific instructions to lure a kobold to their house. They must go on St John's Day between noon and one o'clock, into the forest. When they find an anthill with a bird on it, they must say a certain phrase, which causes the bird to transform into a small human. The figure then leaps into a bag carried by the homeowner, and they can then transfer the kobold to their home. Even if servants come and go, the kobold stays.

House kobolds usually live in the hearth area of a house, although some tales place them in less frequented parts of the home, in the woodhouse, in barns and stables, or in the beer cellar of an inn. At night, such kobolds do chores that the human occupants neglected to finish before bedtime: They chase away pests, clean the stables, feed and groom the cattle and horses, scrub the dishes and pots, and sweep the kitchen. The wolterkens, wolterken is described as a spirit that scrapes the horse (that is to say, with the currycomb or in German, Striegel) in their stalls, feeds the swine to fatten them, and draws water and carries it over to the cattle to drink. (Note: Samuel Meiger, quoted by Grimm, but the Low German is not fully English-translated by Stallybrass. Rendered into standard modern German by Fritz Meyers.)

Other kobolds help tradespeople and shopkeepers.

Kobolds are spirits and, as such, part of a spiritual realm. However, as with other European spirits, they often dwell among the living. The spirit's doings, and how humans interact will be discussed further below (§ Activities and interactions).

Kobolds can take on the appearance of children, be dressed a certain way, or manifest as non-human animals, fire, humans, and objects. This is further discussed below (§ Physical description)

== Physical description ==
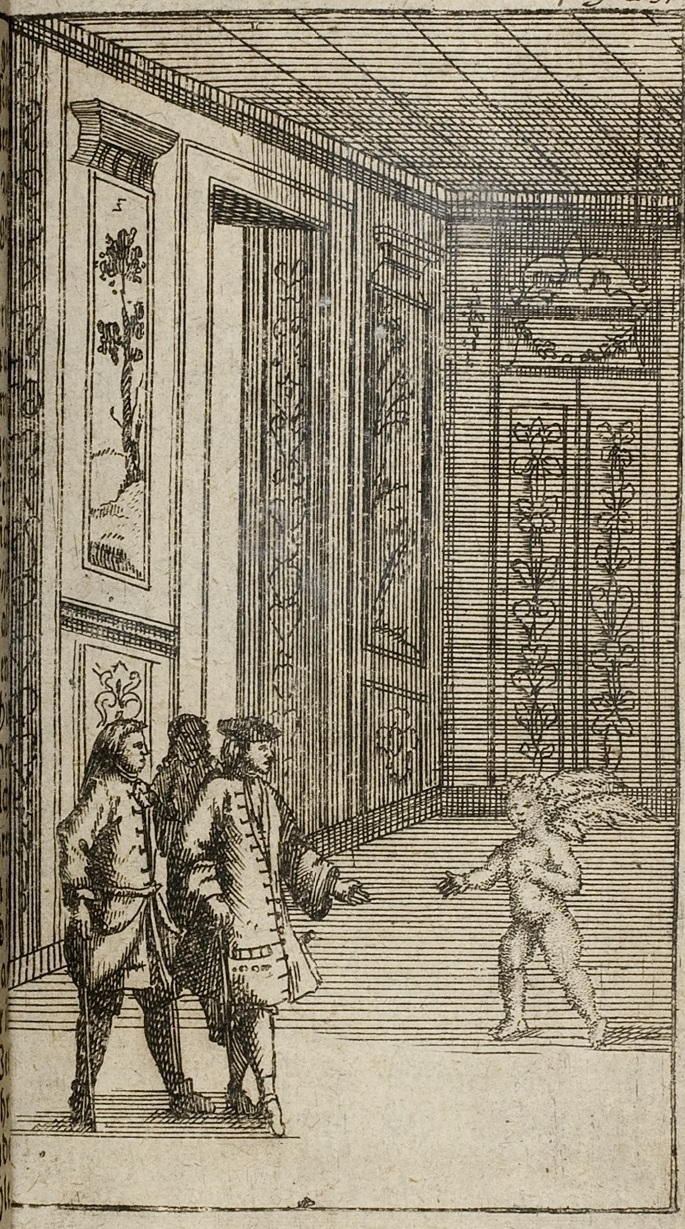
Winged Hintzelmann in the household. ―Der vielförmige Hintzelmann, Feldmann (1704), Ch. 2

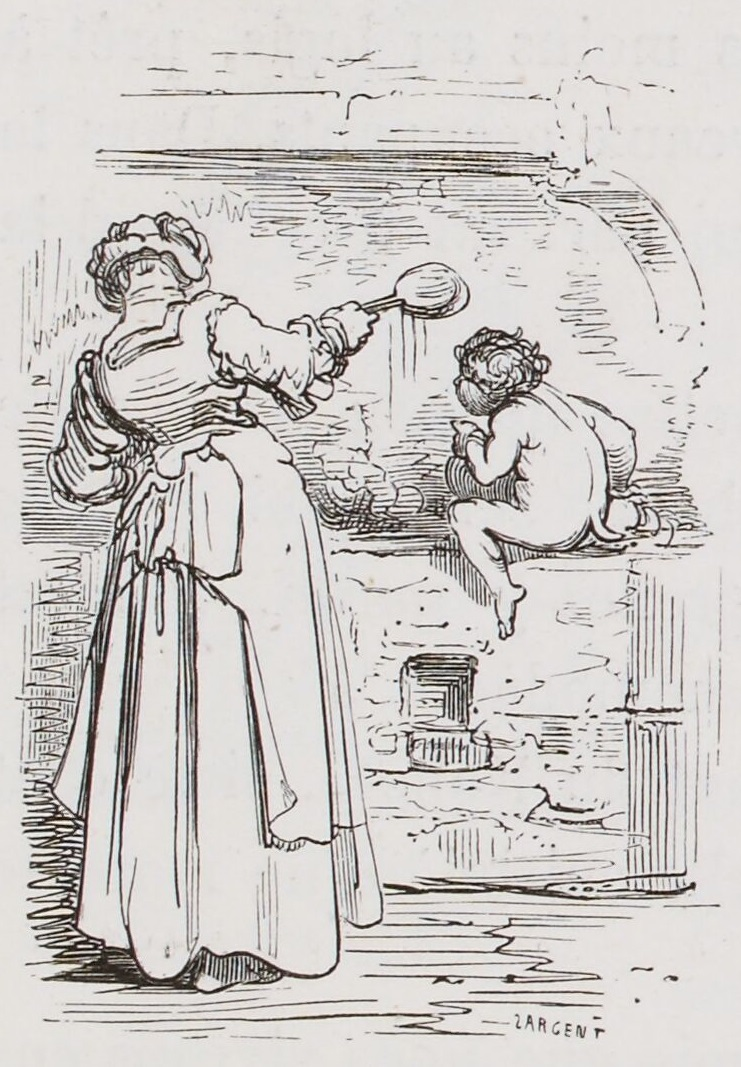
The kobold Chim helps the kitchen maid ―Illustrated by Gustav Doré, Saintine (1862) Mythologie du Rhin

There seems to be contradictory opinion on whether a kobold should be generally regarded as boyish looking, or more elderly and bearded. An earlier edition (1819) of the Brockhaus Enzyklopädie gives the childlike description, however, a later edition (1885) amends to the view of an elderly looking kobold, with a beard. Yet actual instances of a bearded household kobold seems to concentrate on one lone example or two. (Note: Petermännchen, and klabautermann, cf. the paragraphs that follow.)

The lore that a kobold, when spotted is often seen as a young child wearing a pretty jacket is presented in Grimms Deutsche Sagen (1816), No.71 "Kobold". And a cherubic, winged child illustration occurs in the 1704 printed book narrative of the kobold, Hintzelmann (cf. right).

The bearded look was underscored by Jacob Grimm's Deutsche Mythlogie where the kobold was ascribed red hair and beard, without specific examples. (Note: A cursory search of Grimms DS do not reveal bearded household kobolds. The legends with bearded manikins are No. 37 "Die Wichtlein [oder Bergmännlein]" (mine spirit), 145 Das Männlein auf dem Rücken (manikin forces piggyback, from Praetorius), 314 Das Fräulein vom Willberg (in a cave, one with a beard grown through stone table).) Simrock summarized that "they" (apparently applying broadly to dwarfs, house spirits, wood sprites, and subterranean folk) tend to have red hair and red beard, (Note: Simrock also registers connection with the red hair and beard of Donar/Þórr god of thunder.) as well as red clothing. The example of Petermännchen of Schwerin is a story that mentions its white beard, (Note: Simrock connects "Hans Donnerstag" with Donner/thunder, but this brief tale concerns a suitor who keeps his name secret (motif of Rumpelstiltskin) and the tale gives no description of her fiancé whom she discovers to be a dwarf or a "subterranean".) and an instance of a kobold from Mecklenburg, with long white beard and wearing a hood (Kapuze) mentioned by Golther (Note: Golther (1908), p. 142, citing Bartsch 1: 68) is in fact Petermännchen also. The klabautermann which some reckon to be a ship-kobold has been purported to have a fiery red head of hair and white beard. (Note: Kuhn&Schwartz, with first mate (Obersteuermann) Werner from Hamburg as informant.)

On the kobold assuming the guise of small children, there is a piece of lore that the kobolds are the spirits of dead children and often appear with a knife that represents the means by which they were put to death. (Note: Cf. Praetorius apud Heine: "the ancients.. conceive[d] of hobgoblins (German: Poltergeister) as.. stature like small children, .. [accord. to some, with] "knives sticking in their backs"; and "the superstitious believe them to be the souls of former occupants of their houses, murdered there long ago".) Cf. § True identity as child's ghost

Other tales describe kobolds appearing as herdsmen looking for work and little, wrinkled old men in pointed hoods.

One 19th century source claimed mine kobolds with black skin were seen by her and her husband multiple times. (cf. § Visitors from mines).

=== Red cap ===
Kobolds supposedly also tend to wear a pointy red hat, though Grimm acknowledges that the "red peaky cap" is also the mark of the Norwegian nisse. Grimm mentions the spirit known as hütchen (meaning "little hat" of felt, cf. § Apparel names) immediately after, perhaps as an example of such a cap-wearer.

The kobold wearing a red cap and protective pair of boots is reiterated by, e.g., Wolfgang Golther. Grimm describes household spirits owning fairy shoes or fairy boots, which permits rapid travel over difficult terrain, and compares it to the league boots of fairytale.

There is lore concerning the infant-sized niss-puk (Niß Puk, Nisspuk var. Neß Puk, where Puk is cognate to English puck) wearing (pointed) red caps localized in various part of the province of Schleswig-Holstein, in northernmost Germany adjoining Denmark. (Note: Müllenhoff (1845) No. 434 "Niß Puk in Owschlag", subtale 1.: "rothe Mütze"; No. 435 "Neß Puk im Kasten" "was one tiny span tall" and "einer spitzen rothen Mütze"; No. 439 "Die Unterirdischen schlecken Milch" "Diese kleinen Leuten.. [were about 1.5 feet tall and wore] ganz schwarze Kleider und hatten rothe spitze Mützen ")

Karl Müllenhoff provided the "kobold" lore of the Schwertmann of Schleswig-Holstein, (Note: He calls the "Schwertmann" a "kobold" in his essay on Beowulf pondering on the connection between such spirits and Grendel that assaulted the Danish palace; however, the folklores he cites are not all specifically translated in the paraphrase inserted in the English translation of the essay.) in his anthology, this tale localized at Rethwisch, Steinburg (Krempermarsch). The Schwertmann was said to dwell in a dönnerkuhle (or donnerloch, "thunder pit", i.e., pit in the ground said to be caused by lightning), which Müllenhoff insists was a "large water pit". (Note: "Wassergrube", p. 601.) It would emerge from this pit-hole and perpetrate mischief on villagers, but could also (try to) be helpful. It could appear in the guise of fire, and appreciated the gift of shoes, though his burning feet quickly turns them into tatters. (Note: Note that the English translation of the essay "tales from his own collection, no. 346 [sic].." is a misprint for No. 348 "Der Teufel in Flehde is localized in Rehm-Flehde-Bargen in the Dithmarschen. In the Beowulf essay Müllenhoff also cites "Der Dränger" ("the presser", No. 347), said to breach dams, localized around the mouth of the Eider, close to e.g. Stapelholm.) According to supposed eyewitness accounts by people in Stapelholm the Niß Puk (Note: Müllenhoff: German: Leute aus.. Stapelholm, die den Niß Puk gesehen haben..") was no larger than a 1 or 1 1/2-year old infant (some say 3-year old) (Note: Müllenhoff, "430. Die Wolterkens": "nicht größer als ein oder anberthalbjähriges Kind sei. Andre sagen, er sei so gross wie ein dreijähriges".) and had a "large head and long arms, and small but bright cunning eyes", (Note: Müllenhoff: "Er hat einen grosen Kopf und lange Arme, aber kleine, helle, kluge Augen".) and wore "red stockings and a long grey or green tick coat..[and] red, peaked cap". (Note: Müllenhoff: "trägt er ein paar rothe Strümpfe,.. lange graue oder grüne Zwillichjacke und.. rothe spitze Mütze".)

The lore of the house kobold puk (Note: Also drak) was also current farther east in Pomerania, including now Polish Farther Pomerania. The kobold-niss-puk was regarded as wearing a "red jacket and cap" in western Uckermark. The tale of pûks told in Swinemünde (now Świnoujście) (Note: Cf. Drak lore of this city under § Fire phenomena.) held that a man's luck ran out when he rebuilt his house and the blessing passed on to his neighbor who reused the old beams. The pûks was witnessed wearing a cocked hat (aufgekrämpten Hut), red jacket with shiny buttons.

=== Invisibility and true form ===
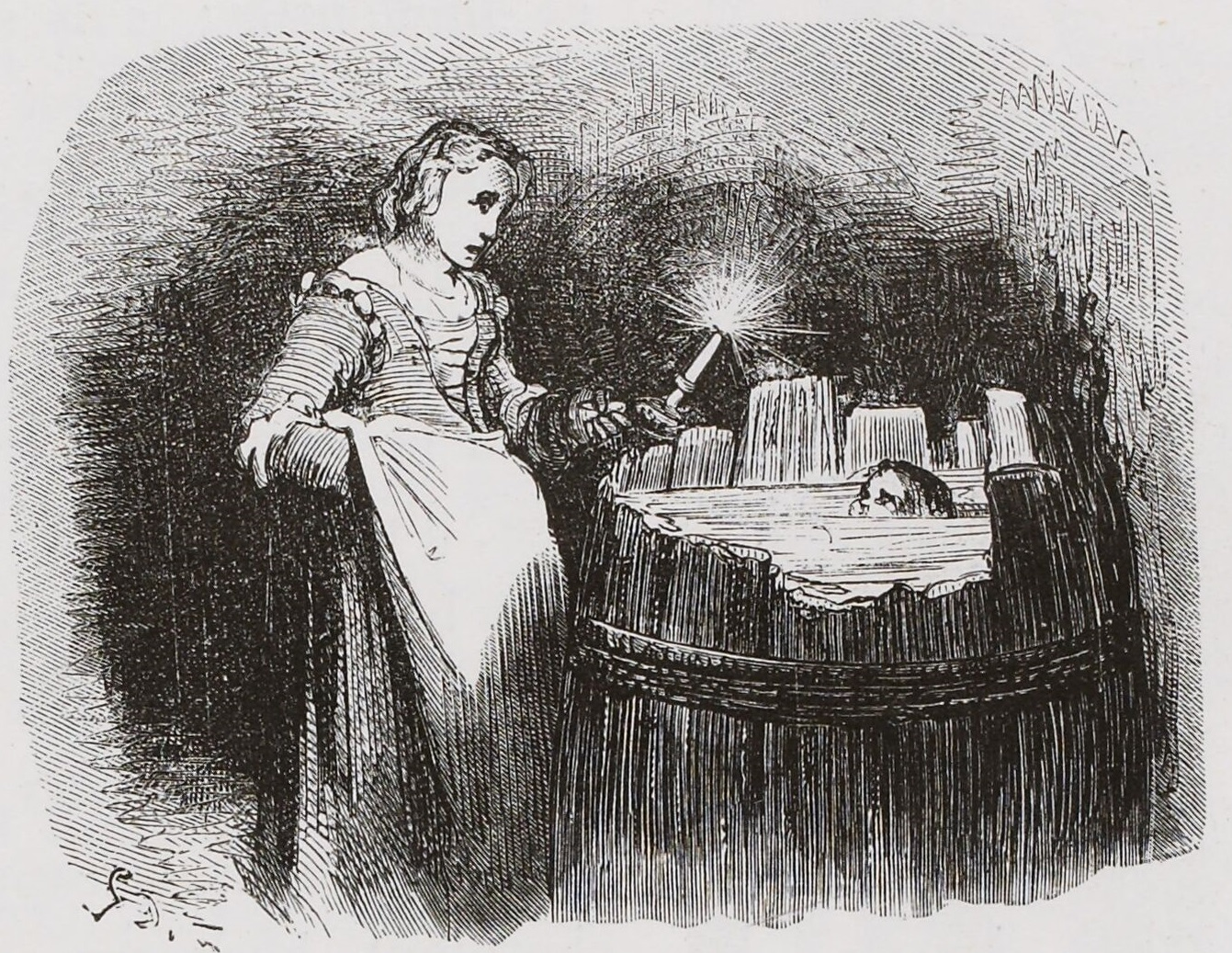
Kitchen maid wanting to meet the kobold Chim, finds dead child in vat of blood ―Illustrated by Gustav Doré, in: Saintine (1862) Mythologie du Rhin

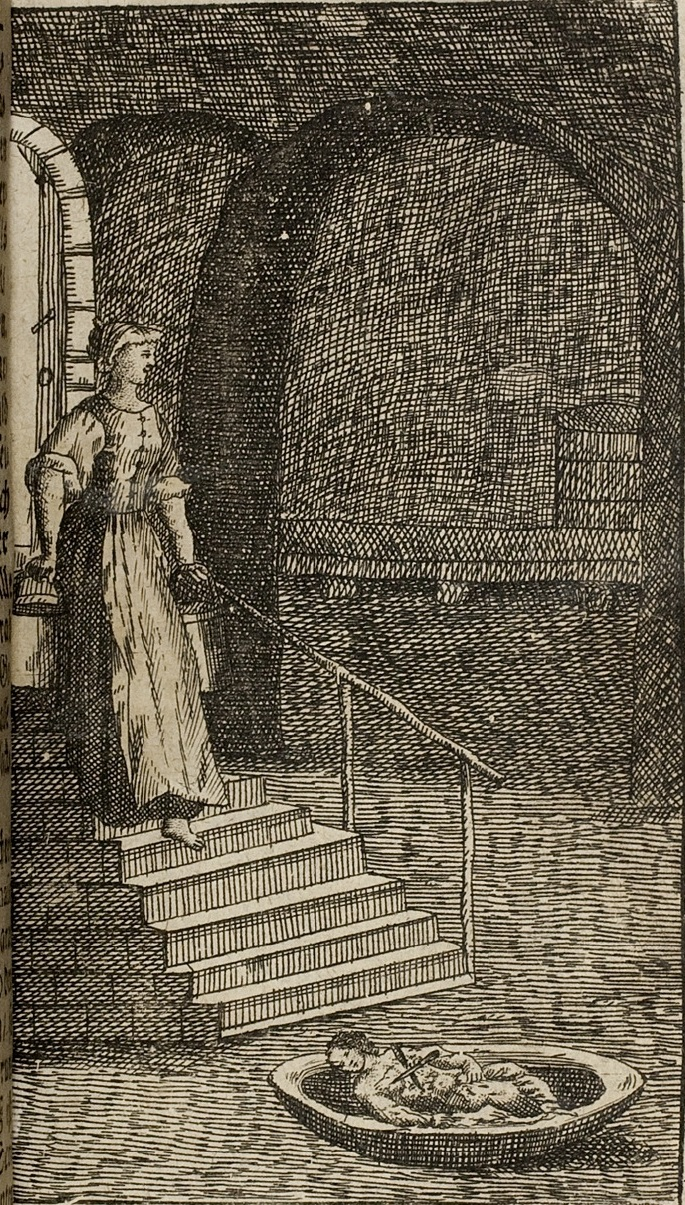
Female cook expecting to see Hintzelmann in cellar finds child with two knives stuck in heart. ―Heintzelmann, by Feldmann (1704), Ch. 18

The normal invisibility of the Chimgen (or Chim) kobold is explained in legend which tells of a female servant taking a fancy to her house's kobold and asking to see him. The kobold refuses, claiming that to look upon him would be terrifying. Undeterred, the maid insists, and the kobold tells her to meet him later—and to bring along a pail of cold water. The kobold waits for the maid, nude and with a butcher knife in his back. The maid faints at the sight, and the kobold wakes her with the cold water. And she never wished to see the Chimgen ever again.

In one variant, the maid urges her favourite kobold named Heinzchen (or actually Heintzlein) to see him in his natural state, and is then led to the cellar, where she is shown a dead baby floating in a cask full of blood; years before, the woman had borne a bastard child, killed it, and hidden it in such a cask. (Note: Martin Luther (1566) Tischreden (Table Talk), translated in) (Note: Grimm DS No. 71 consolidates the versions into the anecdote of "Kurd Chimgen" or "Heinzchen", since it cites both Praetorius and Martin Luther as sources.) (Note: This matches the retelling given by Saintine (1862), accompanied by Gustave Doré's illustration of the child floating in its own blood inside a tub (cf. Fig. right), but the text is altered and the illustration omitted in the English translation.)

==== True identity as child's ghost ====
Saintine follows the story above with a piece of lore that kobolds are regarded as (ghosts of) infants, and the tail ("caudal appendage") that they have represents the knife used to kill them. What Praetorius (1666) stated was that the goblin haunting a house often appeared in the guise of children with knives stuck in their backs, revealing them to be ghosts of children murdered in that manner.

The lore that the kobold's true identity is the soul of a child who died unbaptized was current in the Vogland (including such belief held for the gutel of Erzgebirge). Like the soul, the kobold can assume any shape, even "sheer fire".

Cf. Grimm, the lore that unbaptized children become pilweisse (bilwis). (Note: The "Pilweise of Lauban" is regarded as being related to the stable-kobold, schretelein. Cf. Schrat.) Also, the Irrlicht (≈ will-o'-the-wisp), locally called Dickepôten in southern Altmark, was said to be the soul of unbaptized children. (Note: Dickepôten described as a name of a "Jack-o'-Lanterns" by Thorpe. This is presumably the will-o'the-wisp of Altmark referred to by C. P. G. Scott and Ashliman.)

=== Goldemar's traces ===
Although King Goldemar (or Goldmar), a famous kobold from Castle Hardenstein, had hands "thin like those of a frog, cold and soft to the feel", he never showed himself. King Goldemar was said to sleep in the same bed with Neveling von Hardenberg. He demanded a place at the table and a stall for his horses. The master of Hudemühlen Castle, where Heinzelmann lived, convinced the kobold to let him touch him one night.

When a man threw ashes and tares about to try to see King Goldemar's footprints, the kobold cut him to pieces, put him on a spit, roasted him, boiled his legs and head, and ate him.

=== Fire phenomena ===
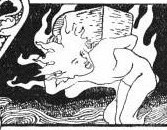
Feuermännlein (little "fiery man") ―Franz Staffen (illustr.) in Hertz (1922)[1882] Bruder Rausch: ein Klostermärchen, 10te Abenteur

The kobold is said to appear as an oscillating fire-pillar ("stripe") with a part resembling a head, but appears in the guise of a black cat when it lands and is no longer airborne (Altmark, Saxony). Benjamin Thorpe likens this to similar lore about the dråk ("drake") in Swinemünde (now Świnoujście), Pomerania.

A legend from the same period taken from Pechüle, near Luckenwald, says that a drak (apparently corrupted from Drache meaning "drake" or "dragon" (Note: Ashliman states the kobold is otherwise known as Drache which is standard non-dialect German for "dragon", but he prefers to render this as "drake".)) or kobold flies through the air as a blue stripe and carries grain. "If a knife or a fire-steel be cast at him, he will burst, and must let fall what which he is carrying". Some legends say the fiery kobold enters and exits a house through the chimney. Legends dating to 1852 from western Uckermark ascribe both human and fiery features to the kobold; he wears a red jacket and cap and moves about the air as a fiery stripe. Such fire associations, along with the name drake, may point to a connection between kobold and dragon myths.

A firedrake could also refer to the will-o'-the-wisp during the Shakespearean period. (Note: Ashliman also makes note that "fire drake" referred to a will-o'-the-wisp in England too, at one time.) And "fire drake" was used as shorthand for dråk of Pomerania (Note: Kitteredge cites Jahn (1886) Volkssagen aus Pommern und Rügen, pp. 105ff, 110, etc.) by literary scholar George Lyman Kittredge, (Note: Just as Ashliman used "drake" for the Pomeranian drak.) who went on to explain, that the German wisps, called Irrlicht or Feuermann ("fiery man") are conflated with, or rather indistinguishable from the German fire-drakes (dråk). To the Irrlicht is attached a folk belief about the fire-light being the soul of unbaptized children, (Note: According to the appended note by anthologist Rochholz, cited by Kitteredge.) a motif already noted for the kobold. And the cited story of the Feuermann (Lausitz legend) explains it to be a wood-kobold (Waldkobold) which sometimes entered houses and dwelled in the fireplace or chimney, like the Wendish "drake".

But the HdA does not furnish kobold names for "fire" or "wisp", and instead, Dråk, Alf, Rôdjackte which are said to fly through air like a flaming hay-pole (Wiesbaum) laden with grain or gold (according to Pommeranian lore) have all been categorized under the "I dragon names" category. (Note: HdA, "Kobold", n 67) 68) 69) citing Zfdk 1,) The connection between the fiery drak and the dragon-associated name in the Austrian dialect Tragerl for shooting star is commented on by Ranke. (cf. § Animal form below for lore of kobolds hatching from eggs, thus leading to comparisons with basilisks and dragons).

=== Animal form ===
Other kobolds appear as non-human animals. Folklorist D. L. Ashliman has reported kobolds appearing as wet cats and hens. (Note: Form of wet chicken is attested in drak lore.)

In Pomerania there are several tale specimens which relate that a kobold, puk, or rôdjakte/rôdjackte hatches from a yolk-less chicken egg (Spâei, Sparei), (Note: More specifically a kobold or rôdjakte from an egg in Jahn, No. 154. from Kratzig (now Kraśnik Koszaliński). and Haas (1896) from Rügen, two tales.) and in other tales, a kobold (aka "redjacket") appears in a cat's guise or a puk appears as a hen.

The comparison is readily made to the legend of the hen-hatched basilisk, and Polívka makes further comparisons to lore involving hens and dragons.

Thorpe has recorded that the people of Altmark believed that kobolds appeared as black cats while walking the earth. The kobold Hinzelmann could appear as a black marten (German: schwartzen Marder) and a large snake.

One lexicon glosses the French term for werewolf, loup-garou, as kobold. (Note: Rädlein (1711), Loup-garou as Bär-Wolff, German Wehr-Wolff and Kobold, cited by Grimm DW "Kobold" 1. 1) b).) This is somewhat underscored by the remark that werewolf transformation was considered an ability of sorcerers with unibrow, which was a physical mark shared with the Schratel spirit (as wood sprite).

These do not comprise an exhaustive list of what forms the kobold can take on. The hinzelmann besides the cat appears as a "dog, hen, red or black bird, buck goat, dragon, and a fiery or bluish form", according to an old encyclopedic entry. Ranke (1910) gave a similar list for kobold transformations which includes bumblebee (Hummel).

== Activities and interactions ==
=== Offerings and retributions ===
A kobold expects to be fed in the same place at the same time each day.

But it is known that the kobold becomes extremely dedicated to caring for its household, performing the chores and services in its maintenance, as in the case of the Hinzelmann. The association between kobolds and work gave rise to a saying current in 19th-century Germany that a woman who worked quickly "had the kobold" ("sie hat den Kobold").

Legends tell of slighted kobolds becoming quite malevolent and vengeful, afflicting errant hosts with supernatural diseases, disfigurements, and injuries. Their pranks range from beating the servants to murdering those who insult them.

In the story of the Chimmeken of the Mecklenburg Castle (supra, dated 1327 given by Kantzow), the milk customarily put for the sprite by the kitchen was stolen by a kitchen-boy (Küchenbube), and the spirit consequently left the boy's dismembered body in a kettle of hot water. (Note: A variant about Chimmeke, localized in Loitz also exists.) In comparison, a more amicable pück anecdotally served monks at Mecklenburg monastery, bargaining for multicolored tunic with lots of bells in return for his services. (Note: Comparison made by Haas (1896) The latter tale occurs in Grimm (1854) Deutsche Mythologie, p. 479, 3te Ausgabe, Band I, and "II" is a misprint, = Grimm & Stallybrass tr. (1883), 1: 503.)

A similar episode of the vengeful Hüdeken (normalized as Hütchen (Note: Grimms DS, and Francisci.)) occurs in a chronicle of Hildesheim, c. 1500, (Note: Johannes Trithemius Chronicon Hirsaugiense, (1495–1503), translated by Ritson, and called an "old chronicle", in Heine & Mustard tr. (1985), pp. 141–142) (Note: These tales are regurgitated by Praetorius also, marked as #2.) (Note: Also in Grimm's Deutsche Sagen "No. 74 Hütchen, a composite from several sources other than Praetorius, including modern oral tradition, with the kitchen tale at Grimms (1816), pp. 100–101.) (Note: One of the Grimms' DS sources is Erasmus Francisci (1690)'s version.) where the sprite exacted vengeance from the kitchen boy of the castle who had the habit of throwing kitchen filth on him; the sprite strangled the lad in his sleep, leaving the severed body parts cooking in a pot over the fire. The head cook who complained was pushed from the heights to his death. (Note: That the kobold "pushed (stieß)" the master cook off the bridge occurs in Grimms' DS as in the various sources, i.e. Francisci, Tritemius and Ritson's translation, via Weyler. Thus the "illusory" bridge in Heine appears to be an embellishment.) (Note: The murder of the "Bishop of Hildesheim's Kitchen-boy" is retold in nursery rhyme fashion by M. A. B. Evans (1895).)

According to Max Lüthi, the household spirits' being ascribed such abilities reflect the fear of the people who believe in them.

The bribe left to the household spirit was a combination of milk and bread according to multiple sources. In the printed edition of Der vielförmige Hintzelmann (1704), Hintzelmann was supposed to be provided with a bowl of sweet milk with white bread crumbled over it (as illustrated in the book). The offering was to be milk and Semmel (bread roll) also according to a lexicon for Altmark. (Note: Danneil, Johann Friedrich (1839), quoted in Grimm, DW "Kobold".) The offering was described as panada (bread [and milk] soup) in the French retelling by Saintine.

Novelist Heinrich Heine noted in connection with the present (Hildesheim) tale that the favourite food was the gruel for the Scandinavian nisse.

=== Other dairy lore ===
As a sort of the reverse of the offering, one tradition claims that the kobold will strew wood chips (sawdust, Sägespäne) about the house and putting dirt or cow manure in the milk cans. And if the master of the house leaves the wood chips and drinks the soiled milk, the kobold is pleased and takes up residence at the household.

The bribe put out for the kobold may be butter, for example, the Niß Puk of the Bombüll farmstead at Wiedingharde in Schleswieg-Holstein would tend to the milchcows, but demanded a morsel of butter on a plate each evening, and the Puk would choke the best milking cow if it was not provided.

According to the lore from South Tyrol (now part of Italy), the Stierl farmstead at Unterinn experienced the trouble where the farmer's wife could not make butter for all her churning in the bucket (Kübel). (Note: This is similar to the lore that the mine-kobold (properly kobel) was thought responsible for swapping silver with then worthless cobalt; the silver-mining operation also involved used of the bucket Kübel, which Muerller-Fraureuth conjecturesd was the root of the sprite's name kobel.) The farmer decided it was the doings of a kobold, and went down to the basement where lived Kröll Anderle who was learned in the magic books, (Note: Of this character, there is a separate legend, "109. Vom Kröll Anderle" is told in Heyl, p. 290.) and Anderle gave instructions to dip a glowing hot skewer into the liquid while churning the bucket under the eaves, which succeeded. But the kobold driven out repaid the farmer's wife with a hot log leaving her a permanent burn injury.

=== Good-evil duality ===
Archibald MacLaren has attributed kobold behaviour to the virtue of the homeowners; a virtuous house has a productive and helpful kobold; a vice-filled one has a malicious and mischievous pest. If the hosts give up those things to which the kobold objects, the spirit ceases its annoying behaviour. Hinzelmann punished profiligacy and vices such as miserliness and pride; for example, when the haughty secretary of Hudemühlen was sleeping with the chamber maid, the kobold interrupted a sexual encounter and hit the secretary with a broom handle King Goldemar revealed the secret transgressions of clergymen, much to their chagrin.

Even friendly kobolds are rarely completely good, and house kobolds may do mischief for no particular reason. They hide things, push people over when they bend to pick something up, and make noise at night to keep people awake. The kobold Hödeken of Hildesheim roamed the walls of the castle at night, forcing the watch to be constantly vigilant. A kobold in a fishermen's house on the Wendish Spree, about a German mile (7.5 kilometres (4.7 mi)) from the Köpenick quarter of Berlin, reportedly moved sleeping fishermen so that their heads and toes lined up. King Goldemar enjoyed strumming the harp and playing dice.

=== Good fortune ===
A kobold can bring wealth to his household in the form of grain and gold. In this function it is often called Drak. A legend from Saterland and East Friesland tells of a kobold called the Alrûn (which is the German term for mandrake). In the tale from Nordmohr/Nortmoor, E. Friesland, now Low Saxony), despite standing only about a foot tall, the creature could carry a load of rye in his mouth for the people with whom he lived and did so daily as long as he received a meal of biscuits (Zwieback) and milk. Kobolds bring good luck and help their hosts as long as the hosts take care of them.

The kobold Hödekin, who lived with the bishop of Hildesheim in the 12th century, once warned the bishop of a murder. When the bishop acted on the information, he was able to take over the murderer's lands and add them to his bishopric.

The house-spirit in some areas were called Alrûn ("mandrake"), though this was also the name of a trinket sold in bottles, which instead of being genuine mandrake could be any doll shaped from some plant root. And the saying to have an Alrûn in one's pocket means "to have luck at play". However, kobold gifts may be stolen from the neighbours; accordingly, some legends say that gifts from a kobold are demonic or evil. Nevertheless, peasants often welcome this trickery and feed their kobold in the hopes that it continue bringing its gifts. A family coming into unexplained wealth was often attributed to a new kobold moving into the house.

=== Eradication ===
Folktales tell of people trying to rid themselves of mischievous kobolds. In one tale, a man with a kobold-haunted barn puts all the straw onto a cart, burns the barn down, and sets off to start anew. As he rides away, he looks back and sees the kobold sitting behind him. "It was high time that we got out!" it says. A similar tale from Köpenick tells of a man trying to move out of a kobold-infested house. He sees the kobold preparing to move too and realises that he cannot rid himself of the creature.

Exorcism by a Christian priest works in some tales; in certain versions of the Hödekin in the kitchen of the castle enfeoffed to the Bishop of Hildesheim, the bishop managed to exorcise Hödekin using "ecclesiastical censures" or church-spells. The attempts to expel the Hintzelmann from the Castle Hudemühlen by a nobleman and later by an exorcist trying to use a book of holy spells were foiled; it later left of its own will.

Insulting a kobold may drive it away, but not without a curse; when someone tried to see his true form, Goldemar left the home and vowed that the house would now be as unlucky as it had been fortunate under his care.

== Other specialized kobolds ==
Other than the mine spirit kobold above, there are others "house spirits" that haunt shops, ships, etc. places of various professions.

The Klabautermann (cf. also § Klabautermann below) is a kobold from the beliefs of fishermen and sailors of the Baltic Sea. Adalbert Kuhn recognized in northern Germany the form Klabåtersmänneken (Note: Strictly speaking, Kuhn uses "small e over a" rather than "ä" here.) (syn. Pûkse) which haunted mills and ships, subsisted on the milk put out for them, and in return performed chores such as milking cows, grooming horse, helping the kitchen, or scrubbing the ship.

The bieresel, sometimes called a type of kobold (Note: Kuhn&Schwartz (1848) under section "XVI. Dråk, kobold", translated by Thorpe under section "Dråk-Kobold-Fire-drake".) live in breweries and the beer cellars of inns or pubs, bring beer into the house, clean the tables, and wash the bottles, glasses and casks. The family must leave a can of beer, (cf. Hödfellow) and must treat the kobold with respect, never mocking or laughing at the creature.

=== Klabautermann ===
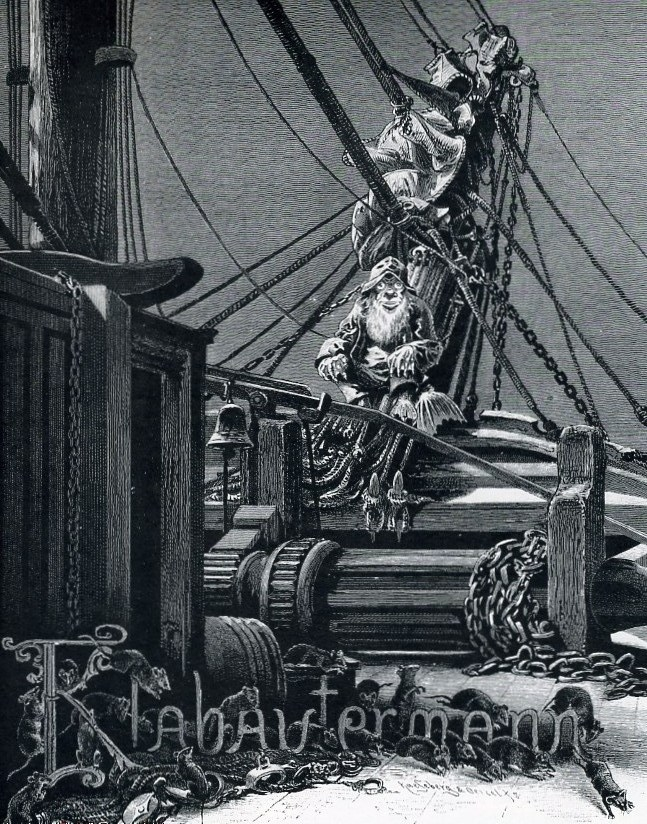
A Klabautermann on a ship, from Buch Zur See, 1885.

The Klabautermann is a spirit that dwells in ships, according to the beliefs of the seafaring folk around the Baltic Sea in Germany and Netherlands, etc. The spirit has been classed as a ship-kobold and is sometimes even called a "kobold". The Klabautermann typically appears as a small, pipe-smoking humanlike figure wearing a red or grey jacket, or yellow attire, wearing nightcap-style sailor's hat or a pair of yellow hoses and riding boots, and a "steeple-crowned" pointy hat.

Klabautermanns may be benevolent and aid the ship's crews in their tasks, but also be a menace or nuisance. For example, it may help pump water from the hold, arrange cargo, and hammer at holes until they can be repaired. But they can pull pranks with the tackle lines as well.

The Klabautermann is associated with the wood of the ship on which it lives. It enters the ship via the wood used to build it, and it may appear as a ship's carpenter. It is said that if an unbaptized child is buried in a heath under a tree, and that timber is used to build a ship, the child's soul will become the klabautermann which will inhabit that ship.

== Parallels ==
Kobold beliefs mirror legends of similar creatures in other regions of Europe, and scholars have argued that the names of creatures such as goblins and kabouters derive from the same roots as kobold. This may indicate a common origin for these creatures, or it may represent cultural borrowings and influences of European peoples upon one another. Similarly, subterranean kobolds may share their origins with creatures such as gnomes and dwarves.

Sources equate the domestic kobold with creatures such as the Danish nis and Swedish tomte, Scottish brownie, the Devonshire pixy, English boggart, and English hobgoblin.

If the definition of kobold is extended beyond the house sprite and extended to mine spirits and subterranean dwellers (aka gnomes), then the parallels to mine-kobolds can be recognized in the Cornish knocker and the English bluecap as well as the Welsh coblynau.

Irish writer Thomas Keightley argued that the German kobold and the Scandinavian nis predate the Irish fairy and the Scottish brownie and influenced the beliefs in those entities, but modern folklorist Richard Mercer Dorson noted Keightley's bias as a strong adherent of Grimm, embracing the thesis of regarding ancient Teutonic mythology as underlying all sorts of folklore.

British antiquarian Charles Hardwick ventured a theory that spirits like the kobold in other cultures, such as the Scottish bogie, French goblin, and English Puck, were also etymologically related. (Note: Roby, John (1829). Traditions of Lancashire. Quoted in Hardwick, p. 139. The sources spell the word khobalus.) In keeping with Grimm's definition, the kobaloi were spirits invoked (i.e., used as invective?) by such tongue-wagging rogues.

The zashiki-warashi (lit. 'sitting-room lad') of Japanese folklore parallels the kobold. Many points of commonality have been pointed out, for instance, the house inhabited by the sprite flourishes, but will fall to ruin once it leaves. The warashi is also of prankish nature, but does not actually help out with household chores. Both sprites can be appeased by offerings of favorite food, which is azuki-meshi ("adzuki rice") for the Japanese version.

== In culture ==
=== Literary references ===
German writers have long borrowed from German folklore and fairy lore for both poetry and prose. Narrative versions of folktales and fairy tales are common, and kobolds are the subject of several such tales. The kobold is invoked by Martin Luther in his Bible, where he translates the Hebrew lilith in Isaiah 34:14 as kobold.

In Johann Wolfgang von Goethe's Faust, the kobold represents the Greek element of earth. (Note: Salamander shall glow, Undine twine, Sylph vanish, Kobold be moving. Who did not know The elements,... — Goethe, tr. Hayward) This merely goes to show that Goethe saw fit to substitute "kobold" for the gnome of the earth, one of Paracelsus's four spirits. In Faust Part II, v. 5848, Goethe uses Gütchen (syn. Güttel above) as synonym for his gnome.

=== Theatrical and musical works ===
A kobold is musically depicted in Edvard Grieg's lyric piece, opus 71, number 3.

Der Kobold, Op. 3, is also Opera in Three Acts with text and music by Siegfried Wagner; his third opera and it was completed in 1903.

The kobold characters Pittiplatsch occurs in modern East German puppet theatre. Pumuckl the kobold originated as a children's radio play series (1961).

=== Games and D&D literature ===
Kobolds also appear in many modern fantasy-themed games like Clash of Clans and Hearthstone, usually as a low-power or low-level enemy. They exist as a playable race in the Dark Age of Camelot video game. They also exist as a non-playable rat-like race in the World of Warcraft video game series, and also feature in tabletop games such as Magic: The Gathering. In Dungeons & Dragons, the kobold appears as an occasionally playable race of lizard-like beings. In Might and Magic games (notably Heroes VII), they are depicted as being mouse-dwarf hybrids. In the video game Home Safety Hotline, Kobolds appear as humanoid creatures with dog-like faces. A kobold thief is one of two types of thieves in Dwarf Fortress, described as "small mammaloreptilian humanoids". The game's creator Tarn Adams has stated their design was inspired by D&D, taking properties of both dog-like and lizard-like kobolds.

=== Fantasy novels and anime ===
The Japanese fantasy novel Record of Lodoss War, adapted into anime, depicts kobolds as dog-like, based on earlier versions of Dungeons & Dragons, resulting in many Japanese media depictions doing the same.

In the novel American Gods, by Neil Gaiman, Hinzelmann is portrayed as an ancient kobold who helps the city of Lakeside in exchange for killing one teenager once a year.

In the novel The Spirit Ring by Lois McMaster Bujold, mining kobolds help the protagonists and display a fondness for milk. In an author's note, Bujold attributes her conception of kobolds to the Herbert Hoover and Lou Henry Hoover translation of De re metallica.

=== Film and television ===
In the East German TV series Brummkreisel, the character Kunibert is a kobold of sorts.

== See also ==
- The Bottle Imp – 1891 short story by Robert Louis Stevenson
- Friar Rush – Medieval Low German legend
- Gremlin – Fictional mischievous creature
- Gütel – Domestic and mining sprite from German folklore
- Hödekin – Sprite of German folklore
- House elf – Aspect of the Harry Potter universe
- Kobold (Dungeons & Dragons) – Fictional species in Dungeons & Dragons
- Niß Puk – Legendary creature in Danish, Frisian and German mythology
- Yōsei – Spiritlike creature from Japanese folklore
