= Hödekin =

Sprite of German folklore

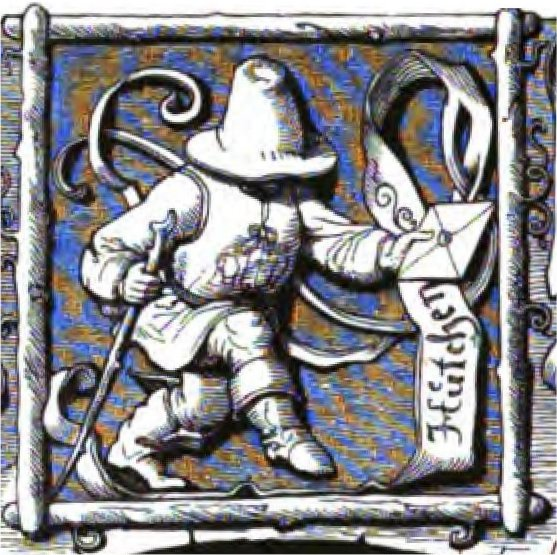
- Hütchen, or the "Little Hat" kobold ―Adolf Ehrhardt illustr., in Bechstein (1853) Deutsches Sagenbuch, No. 274 "Die Kobolde"

Creature information
- Other name(s): Hödeken, Hütgin, Hüdekin, Hütchen
- Grouping: Household spirit
- Sub grouping: Kobold
- Similar entities: Hinzelmann, Schrat, Nisse, Nis Puk, Heinzelmännchen

Origin
- Country: Germany

Hödekin (Note: Rather than Hödekin being strictly correct, the vowel "ö" actually occurs as Early modern German "o with e above" in Praetorius, and transcribed that way by Wyl.) (variously spelled Hödeken, Hütgin, Hüdekin, and Hütchen, etc.) is a kobold (house spirit) of German folklore. The name, a diminutive meaning "Little Hat", refers to the pileus hat he wears, a style which was common in Ancient Greece and, later, various parts of Europe.

Hödekin is known for haunting the castle of Bishop Bernard (Bernhardus), the Prince-Bishopric of Hildesheim, located in Lower Saxony. In some versions of the legend, the spirit inhabits Winzenburg, a county which he helped the bishopric obtain.

Though Hödekin did not initiate harm, he was murderously vindictive. He dismembered a kitchen boy after the boy habitually insulted him and poured kitchen filth upon him. When the cook (who hadn't controlled the misbehaving boy) griped, the sprite tainted the meat for the bishop with toad blood and venom. When the cook remained unfazed, Hödekin pushed him into a ditch from a great height, killing him.

Hödekin's actions weren't always malicious. He once helped a man by fiercely protecting his wife. When the man jokingly entrusted his wife to Hödekin during his absence, the sprite took it seriously and chased off every man who called on the adulterous wife. He also helped an idiot clerk appointed to the synod by giving him a ring made of laurel leaves that granted him knowledge and intelligence. Ultimately, the spirit's time in Hildesheim ended when the bishop exorcised him with ecclesiastical incantations and drove him out of the city.

== Sources ==
The earlier known account of the story was told in Johannes Trithemius's Chronicon Hirsaugiense (1495–1503), who placed the story in the context of historical events which he dates to c. 1132. (Note: Trithemius quoted by Schelwig.) The story gained immense popularity after its inclusion in the 1586 German edition of Johann Weyer's De praestigiis daemonum (it wasn't included in the original Latin edition from 1563). Joseph Ritson (published 1831; written c. 1800 (Note: Ritson died 1803, but the work Fairy Tales was published posthumously in 1831 by his nephew. The writing is not contemporaneous with The Quip Modest (1788) but of "Ritson's last years".)) translated Trithemius via Weyer. (Note: Tristhemius; tr. Ritson)

The legend was retold by the Brothers Grimm in Deutsche Sagen as No. 74, "Hütchen", based on multiple sources, including Weyer, Johannes Praetorius (1666), Erasmus Francisci (1690), and unspecified oral sources. A full English translation of the Grimms' retelling was provided by Thomas Roscoe (1826), titled The Domestic Goblin Hutchen.

An abridged account of the "Hödeken" was provided in English by Thomas Keightley (1828). Heinrich Heine also discussed the story in his 1834 Deutschland, where he copied from Dobeneck, who had provided a German translation of the original account by Trithemius. Heine's essay is also available in English translation.

Johann Conrad Stephan Hölling (1687–1733), in his Einleitung [etc.] des Hochstiffts Hildesheim (Introduction [etc.] to the Hochstift of Hildesheim, 1730) writes that he took his first ten chapters from Johannes Letzner's Chronicon monasterium hildesiense, including an account of the "Hödecken", which he says resided in Winzenburg.

An oral version which places a spirit named "Hans with the little hat" at Winzenburg was recorded by Kuhn & Schwartz as "Hans mit dem Hütchen" and includes the kitchen boy's murder (cf. § Kitchen murders; § Oral Winzenburg version).

== Nomenclature ==
The spirit is called "the capped [one]" (pileatus) in the Latin prose, with the German form given as Hütgin, and the Saxon form as Hüdekin. (Note: Trithemius.) The Saxon form is spelt Hedeckin by Weyer, and the Lower Saxon form Hödekecken by Francisci, who lists Hudgen and Hütchen as normalized forms.

Praetorius provides the form Hödekin. Grimm used the form Hödeken attested in a Lower Saxon dialect poem. Keightley also employed the form Hödeken (further anglicised as Hatekin or "Little Hat"), but the name in the index was emended to Hödekin in Keightley's 1850 edition.

Sources consistently explain that the sprite wears peasant's clothing and a hat on its head. For this reason, he is called Hüdekin (Note: Trithemius. Trithemius quoted via Dobeneck by Heine as "Hüdeken".) (also spelled Hedeckin or Hödekin) in the Saxon dialect. Wyl glosses the Latin noun form, deriving from the adjective pilleatus, as meaning "felt cap". Grimm's Deutsche Sagen retelling concurs and described the headgear the kobold wears as a "felt hat". (Note: Heine adds: "For the sake of accuracy I must note that Hüdeken's head covering differs from the ordinary costume of the kobolds. They are usually dressed in gray and wear a little red cap [rothes Käppchen]. At least this is the way they look in Denmark [i.e. the nissen as described by Hans Christian Andersen]".) (Note: A better translation is "hood", "cowl", making the suggestion that it is perhaps a diminutive of Odin/Woden/Wotan unnecessary.)

The forms given by Hölling (1730) are various: Hödecken, Heidecke, Hoidecke, Hödecke, Heideke, Hödeke, Heideken. The Chronicon Luneburgicum (written up to 1421) records "VVinsenberch Hoideke", while Botho's Chronica Brunswicenses (1489) gives "Bodecke" as the sprite's name.

== Historic background ==
The Hütchen's haunt is placed at the Stift Hildesheim, ostensibly the Prince-Bishopric of Hildesheim. There, where the office held court, the spirit appeared and foretold to Bishop Bernhard of impending dangers. (Note: Tristhemius; tr. Ritson) The Bishop of Hildesheim subsequently overtook Winzenburg, in Hildesheim (district), thanks in part to the sprite delivering news about the upheaval there, whereas the Grimms gave a fictive version of what happened (cf. below).

Historically, the transfer of Winzenburg followed the killing of Burchard I of Loccum by Herman I, Count of Winzenburg, c. 1130, resulting in Herman's outlawry and loss of Winzenburg. The sources describe this, stating that the kinsmen of Burchard attacked in reprisal and began looting Winzenburg, but, the story claims, the sprite Hütchen alerted the Bishop of Hildesheim one step ahead, allowing the clergyman to assume control of the county of Winzenburg with the auspices of the emperor.

== Legend ==
The spirit named Hütgin had been seen by many in the diocese of Hildesheim, according to Trithemius's version. It would speak familiarly with people, both visibly and invisibly. It appeared in rustic clothing, and, of course, the hat. It did not initiate harm and only reciprocated. But it never forgot injury or insult and paid back with shame befallen upon the perpetrator.

Acting on Hütgin's tip, Bishop Bernard (Bernhardus) was able to seize Winzenburg (as aforementioned), and annex the county to Church of Hildesheim. Grimm provides a different account, apparently taken from Bothonis Chronica Brunswicenses Picturatum (1489), where Count Herman sleeps with the wife of a knight serving him, and the cuckolded knight sees no other way to redress his shame except by bloodshed, stabbing both the count and his pregnant wife to death, so that Winzenburg is forfeit without heir. This vacancy in the county is delivered as news by the sprite to the bishop, who consequently gains Wintzenburg and nearby Alfeld as added territory. (Note: . Even though the Grimms cite from Leibnitz's edition of Braunschweig literature, vol. III, which includes the Bothonis Chronica Brunswicenses entry for year 1133 at p. 338 (as cited by Dobeneck), the Grimms do not cite that spot but rather other works edited by Leibnitz III.)

=== Kitchen murders ===
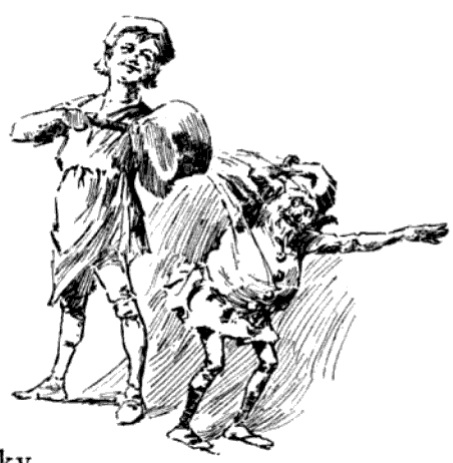
The kobold of Hildesheim ―Illustrated by William A. McCullough, Nymphs, Nixies and Naiads (1895)

At the "Court" of the Bishop (the tale also refers to the "castle" (Note: After the cook was pushed from the heights near the draw-bridge to the ditch or hole, an alert was raised, and "Upon the walls of the city and castle diligently going round, in the night-time, he forced all the guards to watch", following the Latin of Trithemius which reads: "Supra muros civitatis & castelli vigilias nocturno tempore diligentissimè peragens omnes custodes vigilare coëgit".)) the spirit would frequently manifest himself in the kitchen doing some sort of service and talking to people familiarly in order to put people at ease. Until, that is, the kitchen staff overstepped the sprite's tolerance by taunting and repeatedly splashing kitchen filth on the sprite. (Note: Ritson, after Trithemius's Latin: "Tale V. Hutgin "boy serving in the kitchen [puerulus quidam in coquina serviens] began to [cœpit] .. despise,.. scorn, [despicere, subsannare & contumeliis afficere] and .. as often as he could, poured upon him the filth of the kitchen [quoties potuisset immunditias coquine in eum effudit]". Francisci has the Koch-Jung/ Bube/Knabe throwing "unsaubrem Wasser unsanitary water". Grimm DS No. 74, combines these and has he kitchen lad fling "Dreck aus der Küche.. oder.. Spül-Wasser kitchen filth or dishwater".) The sprite vowed revenge, and when the kitchen boy went to sleep, Hödekin strangled him, cut him to pieces, and put his flesh in a pot over the fire. The master chef, who had not disciplined the boy in the first place, rebuked the kobold for the grotesque prank, becoming the next target. The master chef's response prompted Hödekin to squeeze the blood and poisons of toads over the bishop's meat and finally cast the cook into the castle's ditch or moat. (Note: Trithemius: "per pontem infoueam ex alto illum praecipitavit [He cast him down from a height of the bridge to the pit.]", tr. Ritson. This is more ore less followed by other sources where the sprite "pushed (stieß)" the master cook off the bridge into a ditch (Graben)in both Grimms' DS and Francisci, hence Keightley: "tumbled". into a "deep moat", and the cook being "plunged" or "thrown" (cf. stürzen) into the ditch (Graben) in both Praetorius (gestürtzet) and Weyer (stürtz).) (Note: The only diverging account is Heine apud Dobeneck's quote of Trimethius in German translation: "the spirit finally led him onto a non-existent phantom bridge (eine falsche vorgezauberte Brücke) and plunged him into a deep moat".)

According to the sources, it was in the aftermath of these poisonings and serial murders that prompted the night guards of the city walls and castle to go on alert. Francisci (also the Grimms) add that there was suspicion the sprite might commit arson on the bishop's residence. (Note: Francisci: "Und weil man in Sorgen siel er dörffte anzünden; mussten alle die Hüter auff den Mauren so wolder Stadt/ als deß Schlosses fleissigst wachen".)

Thus, it seems misleading for the Grimms (and Keightely) in an earlier passage to credit the sprite as performing an act of diligence to keeping the night watch alert.

The murder of the "Bishop of Hildesheim's Kitchen-boy" is retold in nursery rhyme fashion by American poet M. A. B. Evans (1895).

=== Wife-guarding ===
A man residing in Hildesheim asked Hödekin (jokingly) to guard his wife while he was away:

My good fellow, just keep an eye on my wife while I am away, and see that all goes on right.

When the wife was visited by several paramours, Hödekin had various strategies for scaring them away. He leapt between them and assumed terrible shapes or threw them to the floor to scare them away before the wife could be unfaithful. When the husband returned, Hödekin complained that safeguarding the wife from debauchery was more challenging than keeping a giant herd of swine from all of Saxony.

This tale is found in the various sources including the Latin. (Note: Trithemius; tr. Ritson) Jakob von Vitry observed that the motif is paralleled by the medieval folktale about "wife-guarding". (Note: Vitry's sermon bears no title; Wesselski calls the tale "Frauenhut" where Hut here does not mean "hat", but rather "protection keeping, care".) These stories center men who grow tired of unfaithful wives and leave, commending her to the devil who does the hard work of keeping the male adulterers away

=== Wisdom ring ===
When a simple-minded clerk got called to the synod, the spirit gave him the miracle of a ring made of laurel leaves, (Note: Probably a small ring, finger-ring, given the diminutive annulus used in the Latin text of Trithemius: "annulum factum ex foliis lauri"; In German "Ring" can ambiguously mean "arm-ring" especially in medieval contexts. Weyer gives "einen ring/ auß Lorber blettern vnnd Wer weiß etlichen anderen dingen mehr geflochten", compare Grimm: "Ring, der von Lorbeer-Laub und andern Dingen zusammen geflochten war".) amongst other things, which made the man extremely learned after some time. (Note: Trithemius; tr. Ritson)

A vague parallel noted is the Lower Lusatian tale of "The ghostly dog and the laurel wreath" ("Der geisterhafte Hund und der Lorbeerkranz"), though in the latter tale, a man shadowed by the black dog gets rid of it after buying a laurel wreath.

=== Exorcism ===
Sources state that the Bishop Bernard finally made use of his "ecclesiastical censures", or spells, to exorcise the kobold from the premises. (Note: Francisci (1690),: "Kirchen-Beschwerungen", echoed by Grimms' DS. who note this midways in their account, whereas it occurs at the end of Trithemius's account.)

=== Golden nails ===
Hütchen gave an impoverished nailsmith a magic piece of iron from which golden nails could be made; the spikes appeared in rolls out of the holes and could be cut inexhaustibly without diminishing the ore. (Note: Grimms (1816), p. 103, om. by Roscoe, mentioned by St Clair Baddeley Added to the German translation of Keightley.) Hütchen also gave the smith's daughter a roll of lace which could be meted out inexhaustibly without diminishing the supply. (Note: This also mentioned by St Clair Baddeley.)

=== Oral Winzenburg version ===
The version Hans mit dem Hütchen (or Hans met Häutken), set in Winzenburg, is given in three parts. In the first, the spirit's namesake headwear is described, and it is said that only the large red tassel (Note: (Quast>Quaste)) on its hat, or the large red hat itself, was visible on the spirit. A kitchen maid pressed the spirit to show its entire form, and the spirit finally relented, instructing her to go to the cellar, where she found a young child lying in a pool of blood (a recurrent motif for kobolds). In the second, a kitchen boy of Winzenburg taunts Hans and suffers the fate of dismemberment. In the third, when the Count of Winzenburg lay dying, the spirit quickly built the Rennstieg (a messenger's road) and delivered the news to the Bishop of Hildesheim, warning him to subjugate Winzenburg before the Braunschweiger forces arrive.

== Parallels ==
A connection between Hödekin and Friar Rush, a rascally devil in the guise of a friar, who murderously subverts the abbot's household while seeming to make himself useful in the kitchen and with chores, was suggested by the Shakespeare scholar George Lyman Kittredge, who noted the connection has been made in Reginald Scot's Discoverie of Witchcraft, 1584. (Note: Kittredge, as noted by Chandler (1907}).) (Note: Kittredge refuted the extrapolated notion that the German "Friar Rush" was the basis of the English Robin Goodfellow (cf. comparison to "Robin Hood", below), stating there was no "reason for believing that Friar Rush was ever known in England as a frolicsome spirit to be equated with Puck or Robin Goodfellow".)

The idea that Hudgin wearing a hat was equivalent to Robin Hood who wears a "hood" had also been noted in the same passage by Scot. T. Crofton Croker, in a letter to the Dublin Penny Journal, published 1833, credits himself for making this connection, which he reckons Sir Walter Scott had overlooked; Croker explains that Robin Hood may have been a version of:

Hudikin or Hodekin, that is little hood, or cowl, being a Dutch or German spirit, so called from the most remarkable part of his dress, in which also the Norwegian Nis and Spanish Duende were believed to appear.

Sir Sidney Lee (1859–1926), in his entry in the DNB, also conjectured that the "Robin Hood" figure had folkloric forest-elf origins, and that "in its origin the name was probably a variant of 'Hodekin', the title of a sprite or elf in Teutonic folk-lore".

== Literary allusion ==
In the 1803 novel Der Zwerg by Goethe's brother-in-law Christian August Vulpius, a dwarf called Hüttchen pretends to be a helpful sprite but eventually turns out to be the Devil.
