= Kiliaan =

Kiliaan may refer to:

- 28059 Kiliaan, a main-belt asteroid named after Cornelis Kiliaan
- Cornelis Kiliaan (1528–1607), a Flemish linguist

== See also ==
- Kilian, also written as Cillian, Killian, Killion
