= Kobalos =

Sprite from Greek mythology

The kobalos (pl. kobaloi) (Ancient Greek: κόβαλος, plural: κόβαλοι) was a sprite from Greek mythology, a mischievous creature fond of tricking and frightening mortals. The kobaloi were companions of Dionysus and could shapeshift as Dionysus in the guise of Choroimanes-Aiolomorphos. According to one myth, they robbed Herakles while he slept. He captured them in revenge but took pity on them when he found them amusing. In one version of the myth, Herakles gave them to the Lydian queen Omphale as a gift. The kobaloi were thought to live in Euboea or near Thermopylae. Parents used tales of the kobaloi to frighten children into behaving.

== Definition ==
Greek myths depict the kobaloi as "impudent, thieving, droll, idle, mischievous, gnome-dwarfs", and as "funny, little tricksy elves" of a phallic nature. The term also means "impudent knave, arrant rogue" in ancient Greek, and such individuals were thought to invoke kobaloi spirits. Depictions of kobaloi are common in ancient Greek art.

== Modern associations ==
The kobalos is related to two other Greek sprites: the kabeiroi (pygmies with large phalluses) and the kerkopes. The kobalos and kabeiroi came to be equated. Nineteenth Century classicists proposed that other European sprites may derive from belief in kobaloi. This includes spirits such as the Northern English boggart, Scottish bogle, French goblin, Medieval gobelinus, German kobold, and English Puck. Likewise, the names of many European spirits may derive from the word kobalos. The word entered Latin as cobalus, then possibly French as gobelin. From this, the English goblin and Welsh coblyn may derive.
