= Hinzelmann =

Supernatural entity in German mythology

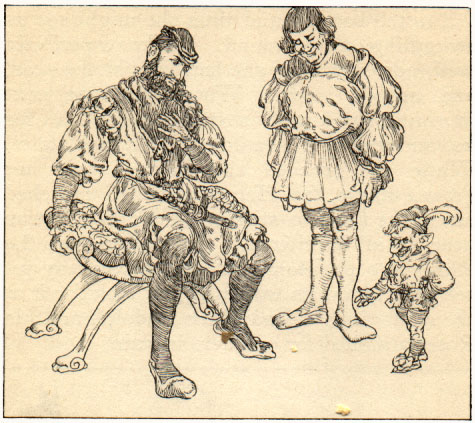
Hinzelmann ("Little White Feather") was a kobold who haunted Hudemühlen Castle ―Willy Pogány illustr. (1912), "The Little White Feather" in The Fairies and the Christmas Child ed. Gask

Hinzelmann (orig. Hintzelmann; German: [ˈhɪntsl̩ˌman], also known as Katermann or Katzen-Veit) was a kobold in the mythology of northern Germany. He was described as a household spirit of ambivalent nature, similar to Puck (Robin Goodfellow). The similar-sounding Heinzelmann (Heinzelmännchen) of Cologne is considered a distinct and separate being by modern scholars.

== Nomenclature ==
The Hinzelmann is discussed by Jacob Grimm in Deutsche Mythologie. Grimm here makes comparison to various spirit names, arguing that this group of sprite-names (heinzelman, hinzelman, hinzemännchen) relate to the cat, and in particular is comparable to the form katerman (variant reading of taterman, in the poem Der Renner). (Note: The didactic poem Der Renner by Hugo von Trimberg. Grimm and Lexer's dictionary cite Renner at v. 10843 "kobülde unde katirman" in the Frankfurt MS. This is wanting in Ehrismann's critical ed. (1909), which gives at v. 10884 "kobolde und taterman" var. kattirmar B; v. 10818 katt'marn B, and v. 5011 kobülde F.)

Though the sprite's name "Heinze" (Note: Specifically "Heinze" occurs as a mountain-sprite (Berggeist, i.e., gnome) name in Gabriel Rollenhagen's Froschmeuseler.) is described as a diminutive of Heinrich by Grimm, (Note: "verkleinurung von Heinrich",) it may be better to call it a pet name (German: Kosename). (Note: Grimm follows with the example of "Chimke" as "diminutiv von Joachim", and such names are listed as category E "Kosenamen" in the HdA, pp. 32–33. The Heinze-related names are classed as "C. Beast/cat-shape" names, except for Heinzelmännchen "H. Literary names" in the HdA.) (Note: More typically forms with -chen or -lein suffixes are considered diminutives.)

Hinzelmann and Katzenveit (Note: Though Grimm describes katzenveit as a wood-sprite (waldgeist). Weiser-Aall in the HdA cites her own article to class it as house sprite.) (Note: katermann is not listed here in the HdA.) are listed together under the category of "kobold names alluding to cat-shape" in the Handwörterbuch des deutschen Aberglaubens (HdA). (Note: Hinz, Hinzelmann, Heinz, Kunz, Veit, Katzenveit Bullerkater, Satzigkater, Satigzieger [Satzichkater, Satzichziege])

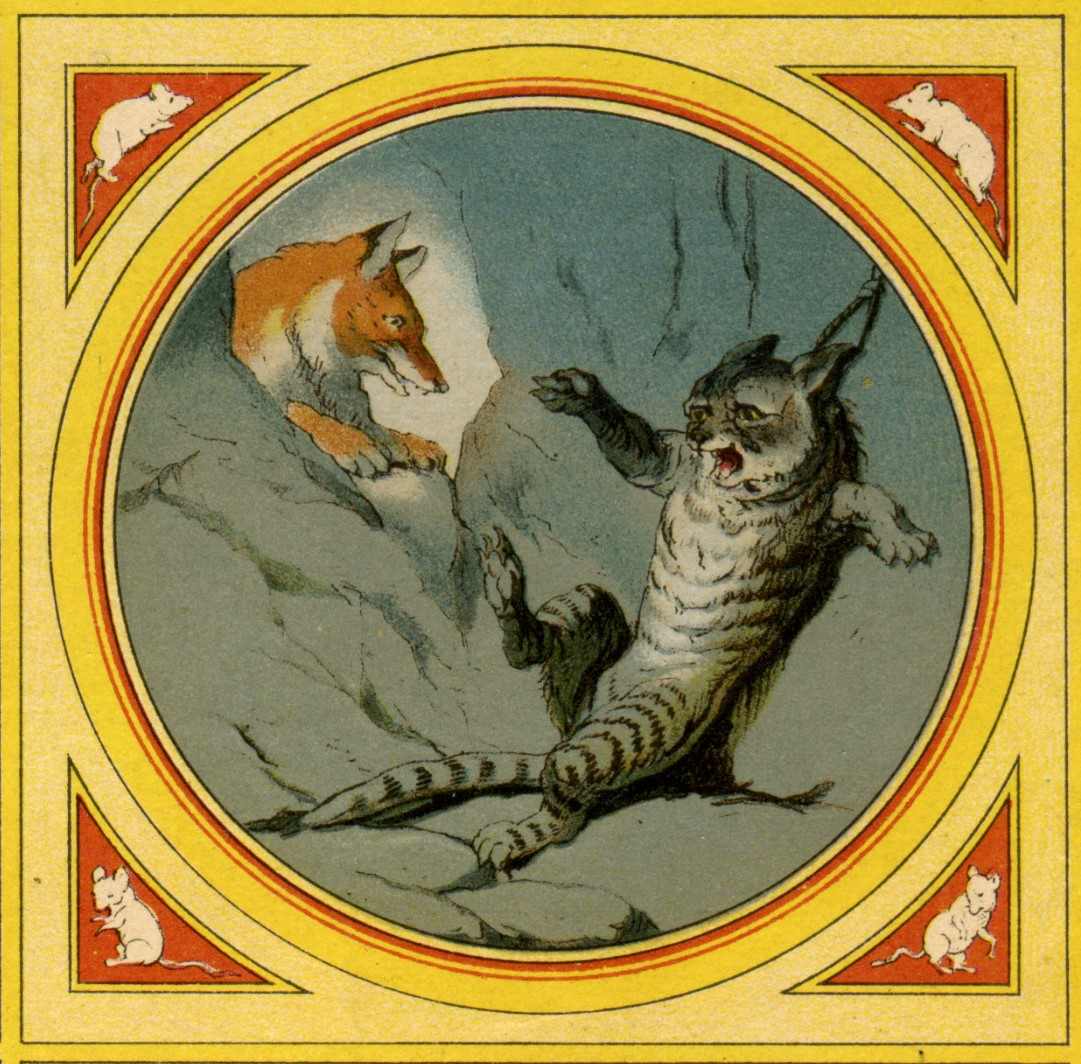
Hinze the cat ―Fedor Flinzer illustr. (1880), from Reineke Fuchs edd. Lohmeyer and Bormann (Note: Cf. also Wilhelm von Kaulbach (d. 1874) Hinz and copperplate etchings from 1498 edition, e.g., at Das 12te Hauptstück. Wie Hinz, der Kater, vom Könige zu Reineken gefandt, reproduced in Johann Christoph Gottsched ed. (1752))

Grimm explains that Hinz was the name of the cat in Reineke Fuchs (Reynard the Fox), so that Hinz/Hinze became a name that was emblematic for a "cat". (Note: Just as "renard" stands for "fox" in modern French, due to the popularity of the Reynard Fox fabliau, supplanting the original French word for fox, which was goupil, cognate with Latin vulpēs (whence the adjective "volpine").) Also, the names (Hinz, Hinze, or Heinz) represent a cat-man type being in regional German folklore, comparable to English "tomcat". (Note: Etymologisches Wörterbuch s.v. "Hinz und Kunz".) The lore is perhaps also related to the anthropomorphized cat Puss-in-Boots, as suggested by Grimm. (Note: The connection of Hinze[lmann] to the wearing of boots and Puss-in-Boots is argued by Grimm.)

While Grimm tended to lump Hinzelmann and Heinzelman together, it has been clarified that the Heinzelmännchen attached to the city of Cologne is to be distinguished from it both in terms of character and appearance. (Note: The "Heinzelmännchen" is segregated as a category "H. Literary name" for a kobold in the HdA, as already noted.)

== Legend ==
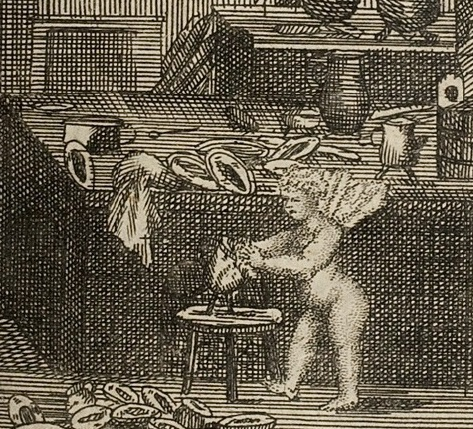
Winged Hintzelmann in the kitchen (detail (Note: Cf. full view.)) ―Der vielförmige Hintzelmann, Feldmann (1704), Ch. 12

An abridged version of the legend was printed by the Grimms as No. 75 "Hinzelmann" in their Deutsche Sagen anthology, (Note: Grimms (1816) DS No. 75 "Hinzelmann" Translated by Keightley (1828), pp. 42–67; Keightley (1850), pp. 240–254. Also revised and reprinted in Boys.. (1852) ed. Knight.) sourced solely from the book properly titled Der vielförmige Hintzelmann (1704), ascribed to Pastor Marquart Feldmann at Eickeloh, who kept a diary covering the pertinent years of 1584–1589.

According to this legend, the Hinzelmann ("Hintzelmann" in the original source) began haunting the castle Hudemühlen in Lower Saxony beginning in the year 1584. (Note: This is contradicted by the incident related below which shows the spirit must have been present before the Magdeburg conflict of 1550–1551.) First only its presence was felt from the banging noises. He then began to talk to servants in the castle, and when the humans began to grow accustomed and no longer feared him, began telling his personal details, that he was named Lüring, with a wife named Hille Bingels, (Note: Verified in 1704 book.) and that he used to live in the Bohemian Forest mountain range. (Note: Böhmerwald as specific geographical location is clearly given by Hans Watzlik (cf. also Lombroso). Grimm refers to both mountains "böhmischen Gebürg" and forest "Böhmer-Walde" and is followed by Keightley, but the Boys' Own Story-book version omits "mountain".) The copperplate engraving illustrates the spirit looking rather cherubic with a pair of feathered wings (see fig. right).

The presence of the spirit drove the lord of the Castle (Note: "Herr von H. (Hudemühlen)".) to remove himself to Hanover, but only temporarily as it turns out, because the poltergeist followed him in the guise of a "white feather" (cf. Willy Pogány's illustration above (Note: The copperplate illustrations in Feldmann (1704) includes men traveling in coach towards a city.)). At an inn, the lord blamed the disappearance of his gold chain on the innkeeper's servants, but the sprite privately appeared and disclosed the whereabouts of the chain to be under the pillow. The lord, realizing the flight to be futile, immediately returned home.

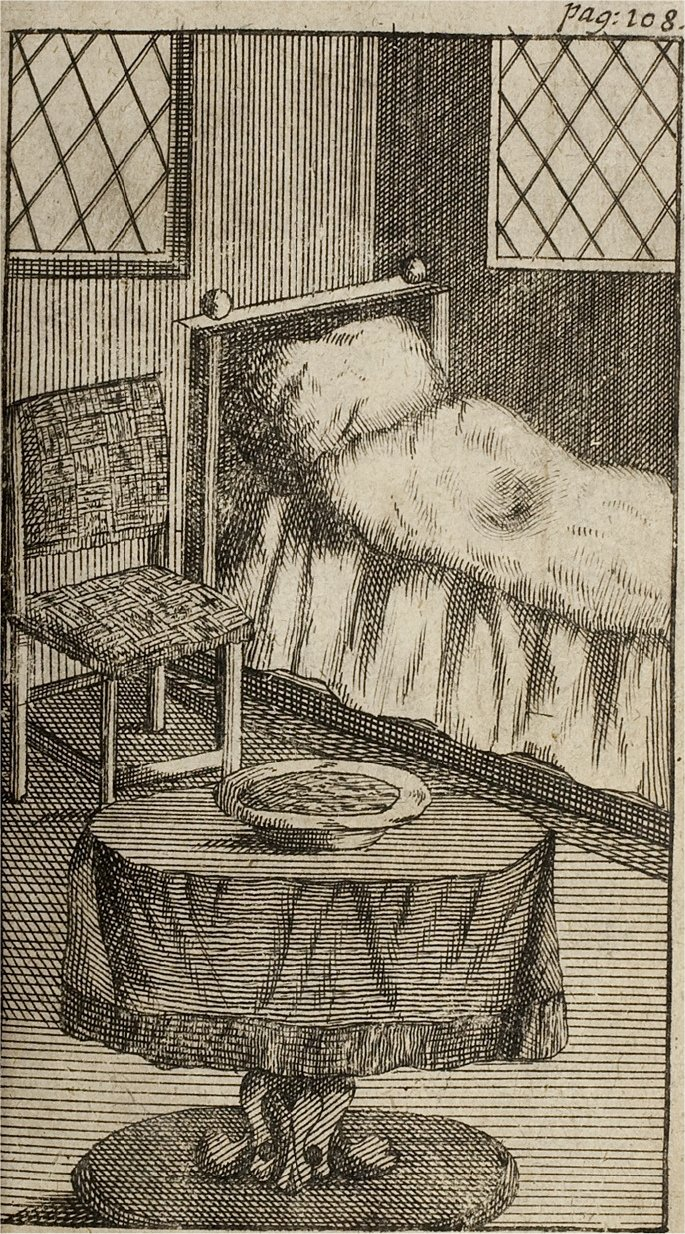
The dimpled bed, chair, and table set with a bowl full of milk and bread chunks. ―Der vielförmige Hintzelmann, Feldmann (1704), Ch. 10

Hinzelmann would usefully and dedicatedly perform kitchen chores such as dish-washing and scrubbing cookware, recover lost items, and groom horses. It gave advice or pep talks, but could strike with a stick when his words were not paid attention to. It was said to occupy its own room, furnished with chair, table, and bed (cf. fig. right). (Note: Keightley (1850), p. 243; Grimm emphasizes that the Hinzelmann leaves a depression in the bed, as if a cat has lain in it.) (Note: Feldmann (1704): "Bettstatt.. nur.. ein kleines Grüfftlein gleich ob eine Katze darinn gelegen"; though Feldmann's book earlier says the sprite leaves a depression in the Deckbette as if a "small dog has lain in it".)

The cook or the servants were obliged to put out a bowl of sweet milk with crumbled white bread in it, left sitting on the table meant for its use. Afterwards, the bowl would be found eaten clean, and empty. (Note: Cf. The bribe of milk or panada given to other kobolds.)

Hinzelmann was also useful finding things that had been lost in the household. He had a rhyme he liked to sing: "If thou here wilt let me stay, / Good luck shalt thou have alway; / But if hence thou wilt me chase, / Luck will ne'er come near the place", which perhaps referred to a nobleman who attempted to drive him away. Also, after Hinzelmann thrashed (Note: with a "Besenstiel (broom handle)", p. 228.) the haughty secretary named Henning Steinhoff (Note: Feldmann says he was a capable clerk and later died as mayor of Winsen an der Luhe.Kiesewetter (1890), p. 117) working at the castle, catching him during a tryst with the chambermaid (cf. kobold#Good-evil duality), he composed a rhyme to boast about it and would sing it to travelers with glee.

Sometimes he would make his presence known at the master's table, then the servants would be obliged to place dishes at "his" seat and serve food, or incur his wrath. The Hinzelmann was certainly a trickster, but his pranks were generally harmless. A comparison has been made between the Hinzelmann and Puck (Robin Goodfellow) of English tradition. One of Hinzelmann's pranks was to pinch drunken men to make them start fights with their companions.

Hinzelmann once warned a colonel to be careful on his daily hunt. The man ignored the advice, and suffered a grievous injury when his gun backfired and he shot off his thumb. Hinzelmann appeared to him and said, "See, now, you have got what I warned you of! If you had refrained from shooting this time, this mischance would not have befallen you".

Hinzelmann also predicted the demise of a visitor to the castle named lord Falkenberg, who had taunted the spirit and hassled him by playing tricks. The annoyed Hinzelmann pronounced the lord's death in veiled terms (that the lord's cap would burst), to Falkenberg's bewilderment. Sure enough, Falkenberg had his chin blown off at the Siege of Magdeburg (1550–1551), and perished. This incident anachronistically places the spirit as already inhabiting the castle by 1550.

Hinzelmann outwitted a nobleman who covered the jug's mouth to trap the creature inside; the kobold then told the nobleman everyone knew him as a fool, and promised revenge of some small sort.

Hinzelmann became particularly attached to two noble ladies who lived at Hudemühlen, named Anne and Catherine. He shadowed them whenever they traveled, assuming the guise of a white feather. He scared away their suitors so that these ladies remained unmarried though they lived a long life. (Note: Carol Rose's "particular affection for the lord's two daughters and frightened away suitors" appears to be in error; Anne and Catherine are given as the Lord's two sisters, while the Lord's daughter named Adelaide is said to have inherited the estate.) (Note: Kiesewetter (1890), pp. 69–70 speculates that the two ladies were the mediums communicating with the spirit.)

A nobleman tried to exorcize it and failed; during the attempt to catch the sprite, it revealed itself in the form of a black marten, then a coiled large snake. Then a professional exorcist was sent in, chanting out of a spellbook, which the spirit snatched away and tore into pieces. The spirit then caught hold of the exorcist from the charterhouse (Karthaus) and thrashed him too, so that the clergyman wanted nothing further to do with the spirit. The Hinzelmann professed there was no evil in him (note he claimed earlier to have a Christian for a mother), and asked to be left alone. When a nobleman protested that a seat at the dinner table was set for the spirit, and refused to drink to the kobold's honour, it prompted Hinzelmann to grab the man under his chin by the buckled strap (Schnallriemen) of his cloak, drag him on the ground, and choke him near to death.

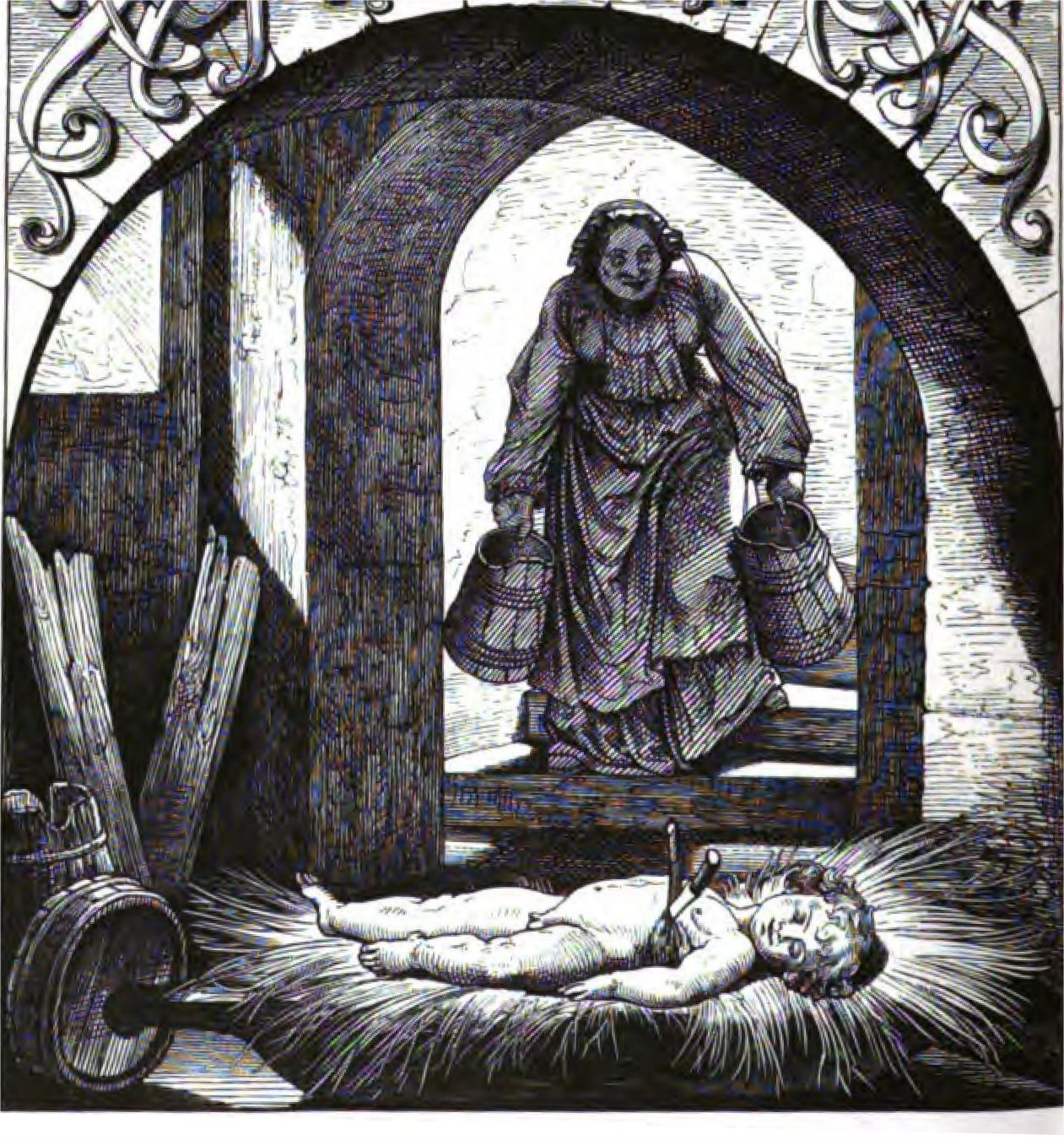
Kitchen maid brings two pails to cellar to the appointed meeting with Hinzelmann who promised to appear in its true form, and is shown the body of child with knives stuck in chest. ―Adolf Ehrhardt illustr., in Bechstein (1853) Deutsches Sagenbuch, No. 275 "Hinzelmann" (Note: Similar artwork is the copperplate (title art to Ch. 18) in Feldmann (1704).)

The Hinzelmann rarely manifested itself, but when it did visibly appear to young children and a half-wit, it assumed the guise of a young child wearing a red samite (thick silk) jacket, with blond (yellow) curly locks of hair reaching the shoulders. In one anecdote, he showed his true form to a maid, who fainted; it was a corpse of a child around three years of age, (Note: German: dreyen Jahren.) stabbed in the chest by two knives (cf. fig. right). She fainted and needed to be revived by splashing the pails of water she was instructed to bring. However, the hats and the knife-struck child anecdote is common to the legends of kobolds by other names.

The Lord of the castle, who never saw the Hinzelmann, succeeded in at least grabbing him and feeling him to his touch. Hinzelmann's fingers were childlike, and his face was like a skull, without body heat. Pastor Feldmann himself, at the age of 14 or 15, claimed to have borne witness to the Hinzelmann hurriedly running up the steps, and while the figure and its clothing and coloration could be discerned, it seemed more a "transparent shadow (durchsichtigen Schatten) than a right veritable body".

The mementos that the spirit allegedly bequeathed to the lord, first entrusted to the care of his sisters, Anne and Catherine, are also described in detail. Feldmann's book continues on until the 31st chapter, and the Grimms' digest can also be consulted for this remainder. In the end, the spirit left the premises on its own volition, having stayed the years 1584–1588.

Although the spirit predicted he would return once again after the deaths of two members in the family, this never transpired according to Pastor Feldmann. The Hinzelmann followed Anne and Catherine to Estrup Castle in County of Hoya (in Lüneburg district) in the guise of a feather and remained at Estrup until driven out by the lord of the castle, returning from a foreign campaign in service to John III of Sweden. (Note: That he wound up in "Estrup im Lande Lüneburg" is also mentioned in the long, full title of the work.)

== Locale ==
The castle where the haunting took place was used as shelter during the Thirty Years' War (1618–1648) but thereafter abandoned by the Lords of Hudemühlen, and was so derelict by 1704 that the chamber where the Hintzelmann did his meddling could hardly be discovered. (Note: Kiesewetter (1890), p. 10, citing Feldmann (1704), p. 23ff.)

== Popular culture ==
Hinzelmann appears in the Neil Gaiman novel American Gods, where he protects the town of Lakeside, Wisconsin from economic trouble: in return he enjoys the annual sacrifice of a town's child (though residents remain unaware of the matter). His fictional history describes him as being a god to a tribe of nomads living in the Black Forest before its invasion by the Romans. For the third season of the American Gods television series, the deity was adapted as Ann-Marie Hinzelmann, the local busybody and shop owner portrayed by Julia Sweeney.

Hinzelmann is the primary antagonist of the short piece "A Late Summer Night's Battle" by Laura Frankos, printed in Turn the Other Chick (ed. Esther Friesner, Baen Books, 2004). He leads an army of kobolds to invade the English fairy kingdom of Oberon and Titania, sometime after the events of A Midsummer Night's Dream.

== See also ==
- Heinzelmännchen
