= Pechüle =

Village in Brandenburg, Germany

- Village of Treuenbrietzen
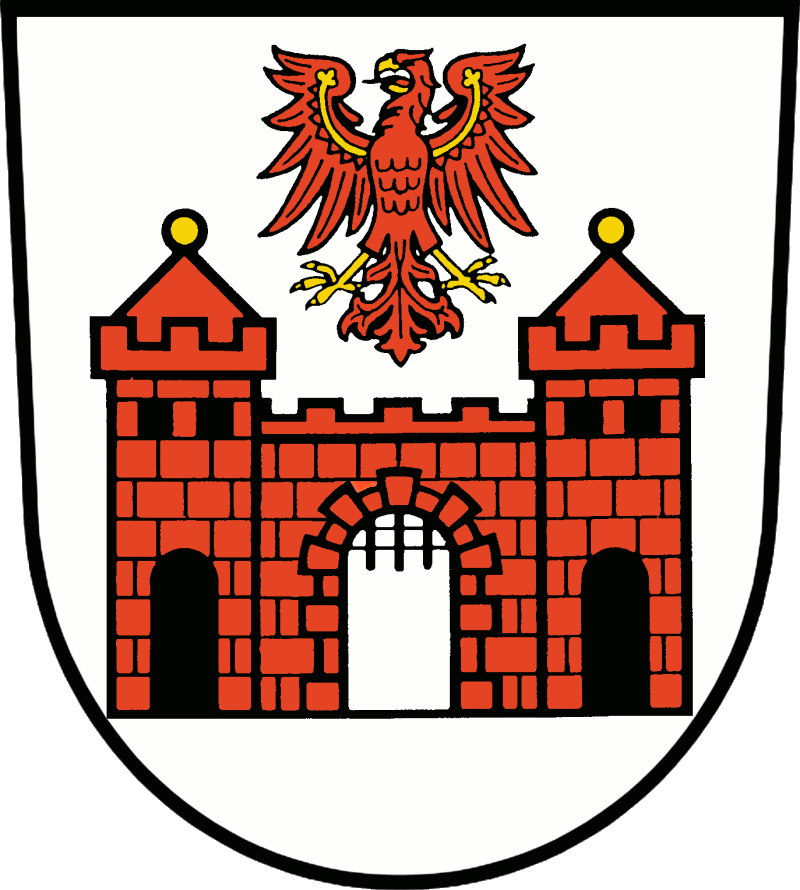
- Coat of arms
- Interactive map of Pechüle
- Location within Germany Location within Brandenburg
- Coordinates: 52°04′29.70″N 12°57′6.12″E
- Country: Germany
- State: Brandenburg
- District: Potsdam-Mittelmark
- Town: Treuenbrietzen
- Time zone: UTC+01:00 (CET)
  - Summer (DST): UTC+02:00 (CEST)

Pechüle is an old village in Brandenburg, Germany, part of the village of Bardenitz, which itself belongs since 2003 to the administrative district of the town of Treuenbrietzen.

Pechüle was first mentioned in writing in the year 1225 as Pechule. A property of the Zinna Abbey, it passed to the possessions of the Archbishop of Magdeburg when the abbey was dissolved in 1554. In 1680, the village became part of Brandenburg.

In the course of the administrative reforms in Brandenburg since the 1990s, Bardenitz became part of the town of Treuenbrietzen on December 31, 2002.

The nave of the church of Pechüle dates back to the 13th century and is the oldest brick building in the Fläming region. The church tower is from the 15th century, with a roof from 1799. In 1960, when the church was restored, late gothic frescoes were discovered.
