= M. A. B. Evans =

American poet

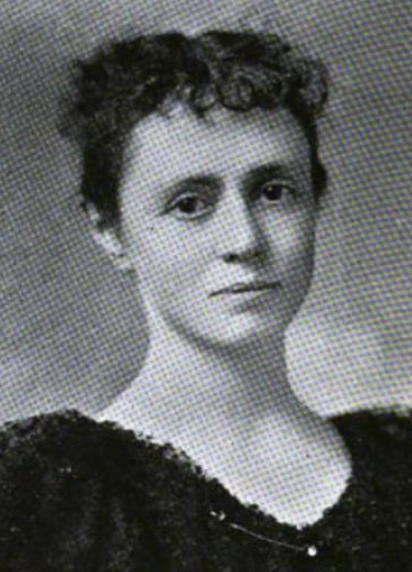
- M. A. B. Evans, from an 1895 publication
- Born: Mary Anna Buck; January 27, 1857; Lockport, New York
- Died: January 6, 1934 (aged 76); Lockport, New York
- Occupation: Poet

Mary Anna Buck Evans (January 27, 1857 – January 6, 1934), usually published under the name M. A. B. Evans, was an American poet.

== Early life and education ==
Mary Anna Buck was born in Lockport, New York, the daughter of John Hildreth Buck and Harriet M. Fletcher Buck. Her father was mayor of Lockport. She graduated from Lockport Academy in 1874. Later in life, she was president of the Lockport High School Alumni Association, and annually presented a volume of Shakespeare's works to a member of the school's graduating class, in her husband's memory.

== Career ==
Evans wrote poetry and published several collections of verse, sometimes based on her travels in Europe. Her work appeared often in periodicals, including The Book-lover's Almanac and Vogue. She gave poetry readings at the annual American Music Festival when it was held in Rockport in 1918 and 1920. She gave lectures on French and English history, and translated French fiction.

Reviews of Evans's work were mixed. "Some of the rhymes gallop along at a rather lively and cheerful rate," said the Buffalo Enquirer in 1895. "Whatever his sex, it is evident that he is a musician, for he breathes a love of music in many a verse," commented a Brooklyn Daily Eagle reviewer in 1911, after admitting that they did not know which pronouns to use for the poet. Louis Untermeyer dismissed her last collection in The New Republic, with a typographic description: "The Cry of Vashti has almost two hundred pages of excellently printed, technically correct, neatly spaced verse."

Evans was vice-president of the New York chapter of the National League of American Pen Women. She was a longtime member of the Daughters of the American Revolution in Buffalo, and the Saturday Club of Rockport. In 1931, she won a spelling bee conducted by the Buffalo Evening News and the Poetry Society of Buffalo.

== Publications ==
- In Various Moods (1891, 1893)
- Nymphs, Nixies, and Naiads: Legends of the Rhine (1895)
- The Moonlight Sonata and Other Verses (1910)
- The Caliph's Secret and Other Verses (1916)
- The Cry of Vashti (1922)

== Personal life ==
Buck married Spalding Evans in 1879. Her husband's company manufactured dredges and merry-go-rounds; he died in 1923. They had a daughter, Mary Hale Evans Norton. Evans died from a stroke in 1934, at the age of 77, at her home in Lockport. One of her sisters died soon after; she became ill while attending at Evans's funeral.
