= Cornelis Kiliaan =

Flemish printer, lexicographer and linguist

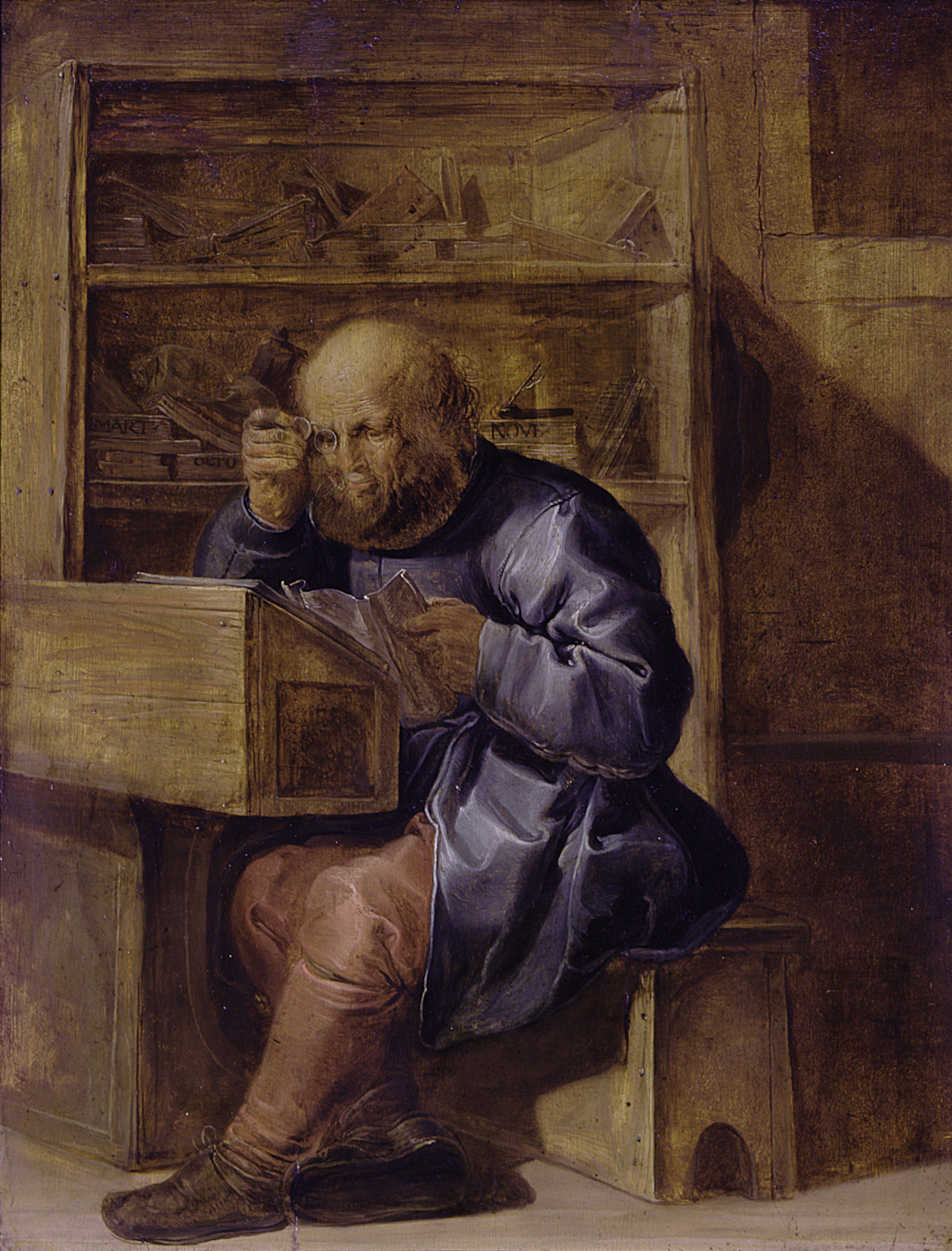
Possibly a portrait of Cornelis Kiliaan at work by Jan van der Venne

Cornelis Kiliaan (c.1528 – 1607) was a Flemish publisher, typographer, lexicographer, linguist, translator and poet. For most of his life, he was in the service of the renowned Antwerp publisher Christophe Plantin.

In 1574 he published the first explanatory dictionary of the Dutch language. In 1599 (MDXCIX) he published his opus magnum, the etymology; it was the third edition (editio tertia) of his dictionary.

== Life ==
Kiliaan was born in Duffel near Antwerp between October 1528 and 7 April 1529. His parents were Henrick Abts van Kiele and Anna Rechtstraets, also known as sDrossaeten. His official name was Cornelis Abts, also known as van Kiele. He primarily used the name Cornelis (van) Kiel(e). As was customary at the time, he Latinized his name as Cornelius Kilianus. His parents were wealthy citizens of Duffel. His father died when he was still a child. On 29 August 1548, he enrolled at the Old University of Leuven to study law. He supplemented these studies with courses in Latin, Greek, and Hebrew at the Collegium Trilingue. He likely never formally obtained an academic degree, as his name does not appear anywhere among the doctoral candidates. As students had to pay extra for graduating, it was not uncommon for them to skip this "formality".

After his studies, he worked in Leuven for a short time, and then moved to Antwerp where in 1558 (or possibly as early as in 1555) he started to work at Christoffe Plantin's Plantin Press (Officina Plantiniana), which was to become the largest printing press in Europe. He started at the bottom as a typographer, but he was promoted to first assistant in 1558. After his mother died in 1564, the entire family estate passed into Kiliaan's hands, leaving him free of financial worries and allowing him to pursue his studies of languages and the Bible. In 1565, he is first mentioned in Plantin's accounts as a proofreader, a position he would hold (first under Plantin, later under Jan Moretus) until he retired in 1604. This was one of the highest-paying positions at the printing house, reserved for scholars. A proofreader was responsible for ensuring the accuracy of the texts. The Plant Press prided itself not only on delivering the highest print quality, but also on printing publications free of errors. This played an important role in convincing authors to have their work published by Plantin.

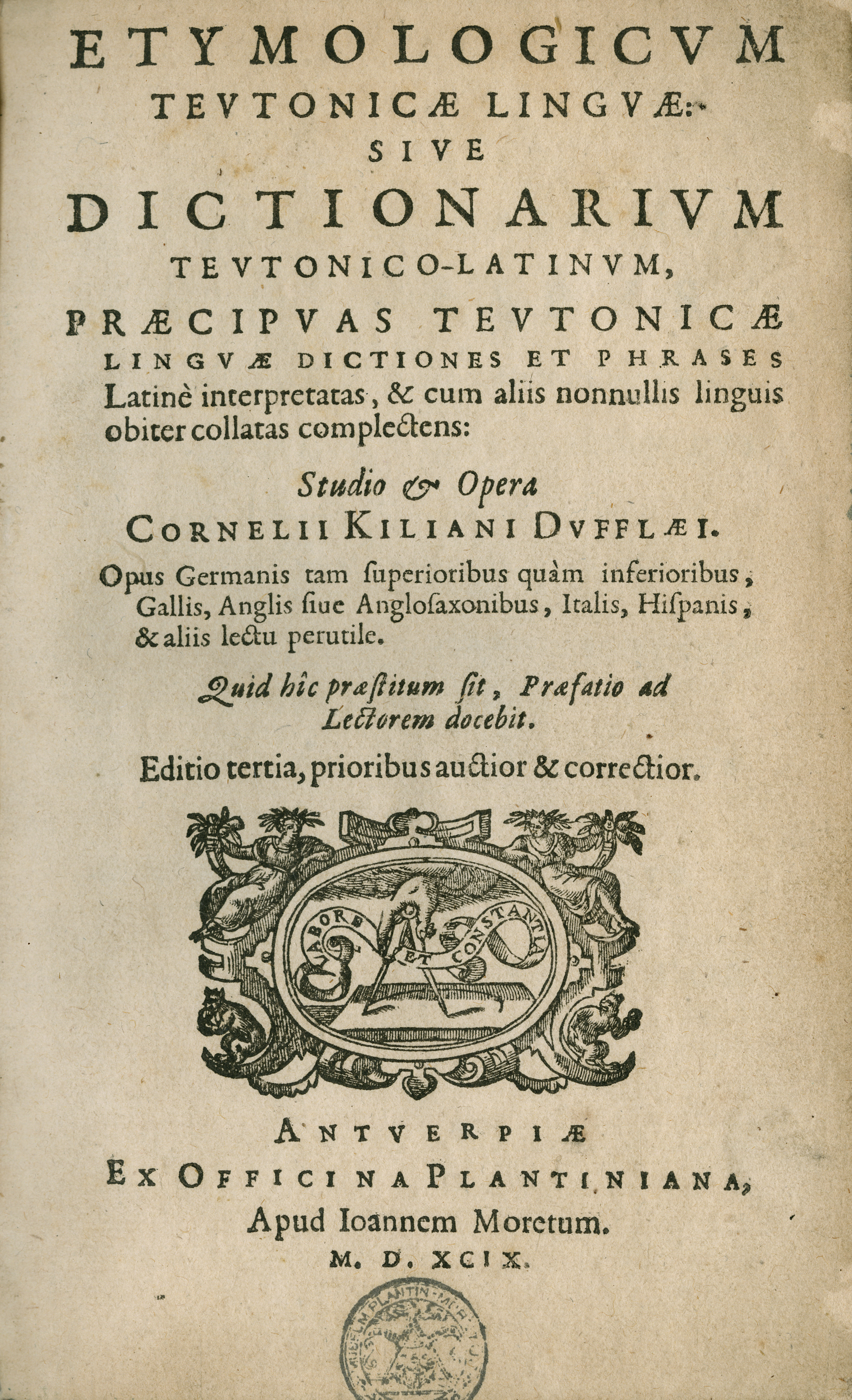
Title page of the Etymologicum Teutonicae Linguae, 1599

In 1574 he published a Dutch-Latin dictionary Dictionarium Teutonico-Latinum, with 12,000 entries, which was innovative because he indicated forms close to other related languages. He was thus the first in Europe to implement linguistic comparison. In September 1580, at age 50, he married Maria (Marie) Bosmans who gave him three daughters: Catharina (Cathelijne), Maria and Anna.

In 1588, Kiliaan completed a second edition of his dictionary, which was almost three times as large. This time he used not only other dictionaries as a source, but also delved into other published works. Another novelty is that he indicated a number of words in the region in which they were used. Finally, in 1599 he published his opus magnum, the etymology.

During the period 1579–1582 in the midst of the Dutch Revolt, he worked briefly as a translator for the intelligence service.

In 1604, he resigned from the Plantin printshop due to illness. He died 15 April 1607 in Antwerp and was buried at the Cathedral of Our Lady.

== Works ==
- Collaboration on the Plantin Polyglot, 1573
- Dictionarium Teutonico-Latinum, 1574 (becoming Etymologicum with the 1599 3rd edition)
- Icones Illustrium Feminarum Veteris Testamenti, 1595 (The Celebrated Women of the Old Testament)
