= Panada =

Variety of bread soup

- Type: Soup
- Place of origin: Western Europe
- Region or state: Europe
- Associated cuisine: France; Italy; Spain
- Main ingredients: Bread

Panada or panado is a variety of bread soup found in some Western European and Southern European cuisines and consisting of stale bread boiled to a pulp in water or other liquids.

A version of panada was a favorite dish of the author Percy Bysshe Shelley, who was a vegetarian, covered in sugar and raisins. It was considered a light dish suitable for invalids or women who had just given birth.

In French cuisine, it is often enriched with butter, milk, cream, or egg yolk.

In northeast Italy, it serves as an inexpensive meal in the poor areas of the countryside. It may be enriched with eggs, beef broth, and grated cheese. Traditionally, it was frequently prepared as a meal for elderly or ill people.

In Spanish cuisine, it is made by boiling bread in water or milk and adding flavoring.

== See also ==
- List of bread dishes
