= Wordhunt =

National appeal run by the Oxford English Dictionary

Wordhunt was a national appeal run by the Oxford English Dictionary, looking for earlier evidence of the use of 50 words and phrases in the English language. New evidence found by members of the public in response to the appeal appears in the Oxford English Dictionary. The appeal is a companion to the BBC2 television series Balderdash and Piffle, presented by Victoria Coren and Archie Baron.

== Background ==
The dictionary has appealed to the public for word usages since James A. H. Murray's first sought contributors in 1879, and the then editor-at-large Jesse Sheidlower said in 2007 that he considers the modern Wordhunt to fall within the same tradition. Then chief editor John Simpson and Archie Baron, one of the presenters, explained that viewers could search such sources as football fanzines and programmes, vinyl records, film dialogue, school newspapers, diaries and private letters that dictionary editors found difficult to access.

== First Wordhunt ==
The first Wordhunt was launched in 2005 by the Oxford English Dictionary and the BBC and resulted in the OED updating the entries of 34 words and phrases, featured in the first series of Balderdash and Piffle, broadcast in early 2006. These included the "99 ice-cream", "bomber jacket", the "full monty" and "ploughman's lunch".

The 50 words and phrases were:

- balti
- Beeb
- bog standard
- bonk
- bouncy castle
- boffin
- bomber jacket
- Crimble
- chattering classes
- codswallop
- cyberspace
- cyborg
- ditsy
- dosh
- full monty
- gas mark
- gay
- handbags at dawn
- her indoors
- jaffa
- Mackem
- made-up
- minger
- minted
- moony
- mullered
- mullet
- mushy peas
- naff
- nerd
- nip and tuck
- nit nurse
- nutmeg
- Old Bill
- on the pull
- pass the parcel
- pear-shaped
- phwoar
- pick 'n' mix
- ploughman's lunch
- pop one's clogs
- porky
- posh
- square one (back to...)
- ska
- smart casual
- snazzy
- something for the weekend
- to throw one's toys out of the pram
- tikka masala

== Second Wordhunt ==
The second Wordhunt was launched in January 2007, and the results featured in a second series of Balderdash and Piffle, which was broadcast in Spring 2007.

The forty words and phrases, divided into six themes, are:

Man's Best Friend

- dog and bone (1961)
- the dog's bollocks (1989)
- mucky pup (1984)
- shaggy dog story (1946) *
- sick puppy (1984)

Put Downs and Insults

- plonker (1966)
- prat (1968) *
- tosser (1977)
- wally (1969)
- wazzock (1984)

Spend a Penny

- domestic (1963)
- glamour model (1981)
- loo (1940) *
- regime change (1990)
- whoopsie (1973)

Fashionistas

- flip-flop (1970)
- hoodie (1990)
- shell-suit (1989)
- stiletto (1959)
- trainer (1978)

X Rated

- dogging (1993) *
- kinky (1959)
- marital aid (1976)
- pole dance (1992)
- wolf-whistle (1952)

One Sandwich Short

- bananas (1968) *
- bonkers (1957) *
- daft (or mad) as a brush (1945) *
- duh brain (1997)
- one sandwich short of a picnic (1993)

Who Were They?

- Bloody Mary (1956) *
- Gordon Bennett (1967) *
- Jack the Lad (1981)
- round robin (1988)
- take the mickey (1948) *

Dodgy Dealings

- bung (1958) *
- Glasgow kiss (1987)
- identity theft (1991)
- spiv (1934) *
- twoc (1990)
