= Robert Stumpfl =

Austrian philologist

- Born: 4 June 1904; Vienna, Austria-Hungary
- Died: 11 August 1937 (aged 33); Guggenthal, Austria

Academic background
- Education: University of Vienna
- Doctoral advisor: Rudolf Much
- Other advisor: Julius Petersen

Academic work
- Discipline: Germanic philology
- Sub-discipline: German philology
- Institutions: University of Heidelberg
- Main interests: Germanic Antiquity; History of theatre
- Notable works: Kultspiele der Germanen als Ursprung des mittelalterlichen Dramas (1936)

Robert Heinrich Viktor Stumpfl (4 June 1904 – 11 August 1937) was an Austrian philologist who specialized in Germanic studies and the history of theatre.

== Biography ==
Robert Stumpfl was born in Vienna, Austria-Hungary on 6 June 1904. His father was a senior official in the Foreign Ministry of Austria-Hungary. He studied English, German and Scandinavian at the universities of Vienna and Kiel, gaining his Ph.D. at Vienna in 1926 under the supervision of Rudolf Much. His dissertation was on Protestant theatre in Austria during the Reformation (16th century). In the 1920s the prospects for an academic career in Austria were dim, and Stumpfl subsequently lectured in German at the University of Edinburgh.

Returning to Austria Stumpfl married Johanna Nikolaia Karoline Spitzy in Vienna on 7 July 1931. He completed his habilitation at the University of Berlin in 1936 under the supervision of Julius Petersen. His thesis for the habilitation, Kultspiele der Germanen als Ursprung des mittelalterlichen Dramas (1936), suggested strong Germanic influences on the emergence on medieval theatre and diverged from the then-standard notion that drama had evolved out of the Christian liturgy. The Germanic line of research had earlier been pursued by Jacob Grimm and Gustav Freytag. Stumpfl was a professor at the University of Heidelberg.

Stumpfl joined the Nazi Party on 1 May 1933.

Stumpfl died in a car accident at Guggenthal, Austria on 11 August 1937.

== See also ==
- Richard Wolfram
- Walter Steinhauser
- Siegfried Gutenbrunner

== Selected works ==
- Schauspielmasken des Mittelalters und der Renaissancezeit und ihr Fortbestehen im Volksschauspiel, 1931
- Das alte Schultheater in Steyr im Zeitalter der Reformation und Gegenreformation, 1933
- Unser kampf um ein deutsches nationaltheater, 1935
- Kultspiele der Germanen als Ursprung des mittelalterlichen Dramas, 1936

== Sources ==
- Castle, Eduard (21 August 1937). "Der tödliche Unfall des Theaterhistorikers Robert Stumpfl". Neues Wiener Journal. pp. 9–10 – via ANNO.
