= Dietrich Kralik =

Austrian philologist

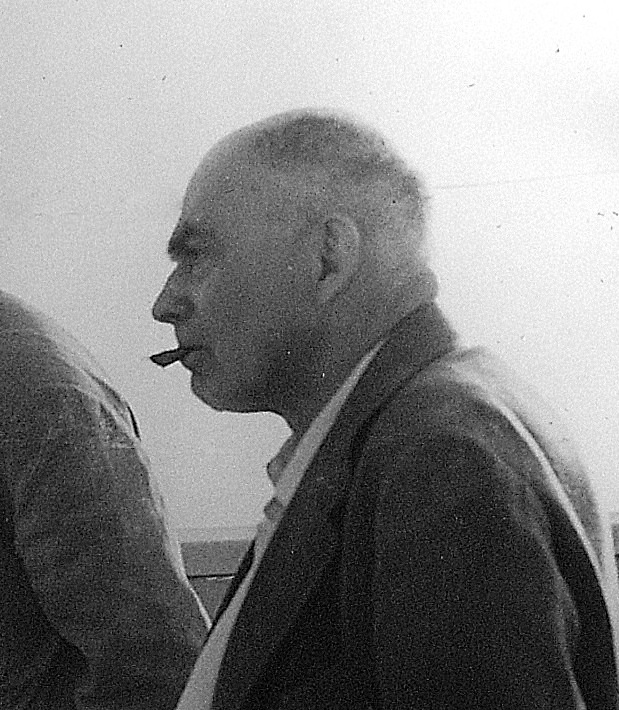
- Born: 15 August 1884; Vienna, Austria-Hungary
- Died: 27 December 1959 (aged 75); Vienna, Austria

Academic background
- Education: University of Vienna
- Academic advisor: Rudolf Much

Academic work
- Discipline: Germanic philology
- Sub-discipline: German philology
- Institutions: University of Würzburg; University of Vienna; Austrian Academy of Sciences
- Main interests: Medieval German literature

Dietrich Ritter Kralik von Meyrswalden (15 August 1884 – 27 December 1959) was an Austrian philologist specializing in Germanic studies.

== Biography ==
Dietrich Kralik was born in Vienna, Austria-Hungary on 15 August 1884. He was a member of the Kralik von Meyrswalden family of Bohemian nobility, the son of philosopher Richard von Kralik and brother of musician Heinrich von Kralik. He earned his Ph.D. in Germanic philology at the University of Vienna under the supervision of Rudolf Much.

Kralik served as a professor at the University of Würzburg from 1923 to 1924. In 1924, he was appointed a professor at the University of Vienna. He was Dean of the Faculty for Philosophy at the University of Vienna from 1934 to 1935. Kralik became a Member of the Austrian Academy of Sciences in 1935, where he served as Head of the Dictionary Commission and Secretary of the Philosophical-Historical Class. He was a known expert on the Nibelungenlied.

A member of the Nazi Party, Kralik was dismissed from the University of Vienna after the end of World War II. He was rehabilitated in 1949 and subsequently reappointed as a professor at the university, later becoming Head of the Institute for Germanic Studies. Kralik retired from his university duties in 1955 and was appointed an honorary professor. He was succeeded by Otto Höfler as Head of the Institute for Germanic Studies. Kralik died in Vienna on 27 December 1959 and is buried at the Döbling Cemetery.

== See also ==
- Richard Wolfram
- Walter Steinhauser
- Siegfried Gutenbrunner

== Selected works ==
- als Herausgeber mit Fritz Lemmermayer: Neue Hebbel-Dokumente. Schuster & Löffler, Berlin u. a. 1913.
- Die deutschen Bestandteile der Lex Baiuvariorum. In: Neues Archiv der Gesellschaft für Ältere deutsche Geschichtskunde. Bd. 38, 1913, S. 13–55, 401–449, 581–624.
- Deutsche Heldendichtung. In: Otto Brunner, Alfons Dopsch, Hans Eibl: Das Mittelalter in Einzeldarstellungen (= Wissenschaft und Kultur. Bd. 3, ZDB-ID 977509-2). F. Deuticke, Leipzig u. a. 1930, S. 168–193.
- Die Überlieferung und Entstehung der Thidrekssaga (= Rheinische Beiträge und Hülfsbücher zur germanischen Philologie und Volkskunde. Bd. 19, ZDB-ID 539421-1). Niemeyer, Halle (Saale) 1931.
- Die Sigfridtrilogie im Nibelungenlied und in der Thidrekssaga. Niemeyer, Halle (Saale) 1941.
- Das Nibelungenlied, 1941
- Passau im Nibelungenlied. In: Österreichische Akademie der Wissenschaften. Anzeiger der Philosophisch-historische Klasse. Bd. 87, Nr. 20, 1950, ISSN 0257-4470, S. 451–470.
- Die Elegie Walthers von der Vogelweide (= Österreichische Akademie der Wissenschaften. Philosophisch-historische Klasse. Sitzungsberichte. Bd. 228, Abh. 1, ISSN 0029-8832). Rohrer in Kommission, Wien 1952.
- Wer war der Dichter des Nibelungenliedes? Österreichischer Bundesverlag, Wien 1954.
- Walther gegen Reinmar (= Österreichische Akademie der Wissenschaften. Philosophisch-historische Klasse. Sitzungsberichte. Bd. 230, Abh. 1). Rohrer in Kommission, Wien 1955.
- Die dänische Ballade von Grimhilds Rache und die Vorgeschichte des Nibelungenliedes (= Österreichische Akademie der Wissenschaften. Philosophisch-historische Klasse. Sitzungsberichte. Bd. 241, Abh. 1). Aus dem Nachlass herausgegeben. Böhlau in Kommission, Graz u. a. 1962.

== Sources ==
- Maria Schierling (1980). "Kralik, Dietrich". Neue Deutsche Biographie (in German). Vol. 12. Berlin: Duncker & Humblot. pp. 666–667. (full text online).
