= Jobst Harrich =

German painter (1579–1617)

Jobst Harrich (baptized 30 September 1579 – buried 11 April 1617) was a German painter best known as a copyist of Albrecht Dürer. He was born and died in Nuremberg.

== Sources ==
- Manfred H. Grieb (ed.): Nürnberger Künstlerlexikon: Bildende Künstler, Kunsthandwerker, Gelehrte, Sammler, Kulturschaffende und Mäzene vom 12. bis zur Mitte des 20. Jahrhunderts. Munich: Saur K.G. Verlag GmbH, September 2007, ISBN 3-598-11763-9
- von Hagen, Friedrich (2000). "Harrich (Harrisch), Jobst". In Michael Diefenbacher, Rudolf Endres (ed.). Stadtlexikon Nürnberg (2nd ed.). nuremberg: W. Tümmels Verlag. p. 410. ISBN 3-921590-69-8.
