= Robert Menzies (disambiguation) =

Robert Menzies (1894–1978) was the longest-serving prime minister of Australia.

Robert Menzies may also refer to:

- Robert Stewart Menzies (1856–1889), Scottish Liberal politician
- Robert Menzies (cricketer) (1916–1983), Australian-born New Zealand cricketer
- Robert Menzies (British Army officer) (born 1944)
- Robert Menzies (water polo) (born 1946), Australian Olympic water polo player
- Robert Menzies (actor) (born 1955), Australian television actor
- Robert Menzies College, a residential college of Macquarie University

== See also ==
- Menzies (disambiguation)
- Robert Menzies Mitchell (1865–1932), Canadian physician and political figure
