= Heinzelmännchen =

German mythical creatures

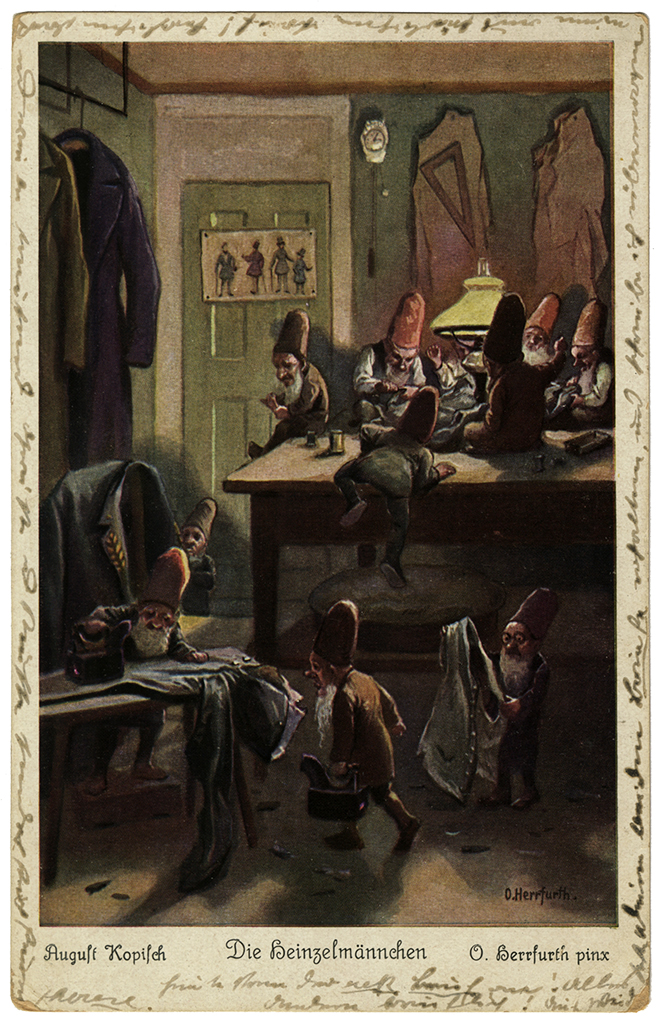
Heinzelmännchen —Herrfurth, Oskar (1926 or earlier)

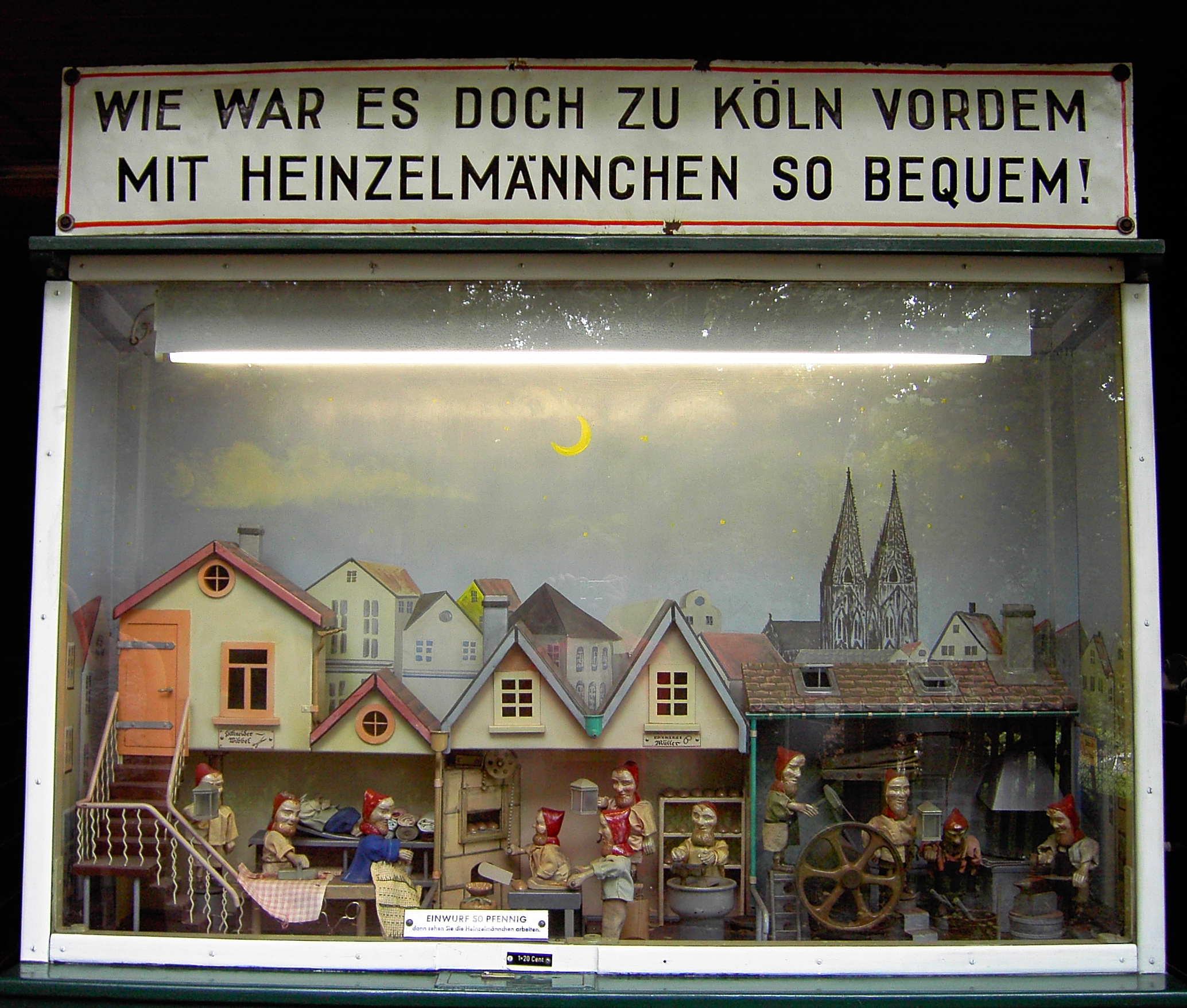
Heinzelmännchen-diorama

The Heinzelmännchen (German pronunciation: [ˈhaɪntsl̩ˌmɛnçɛn]) are helpful household spirits or kobolds associated with the city of Cologne in Germany, akin to brownies of Scotland.

It has become traditional to tell their story during Christmas-tide. The creatures are also loosely referred to as "elves", rather in the sense of "The Elves and the Shoemaker".

The little house gnomes are said to have done all the work of the citizens of Cologne during the night, so that the inhabitants of Cologne could be very lazy during the day. According to the legend, this went on until a tailor's wife got so curious to see the gnomes that she scattered peas onto the floor of the workshop to make the gnomes slip and fall. This infuriated the gnomes, who disappeared and never returned. From that time on, the citizens of Cologne had to do all their work by themselves.

== Nomenclature ==
Hänneschen once used to be a commonplace character in Cologne's puppet theater. The genuine Kölsch (Colognian) dialect form should be Heizemann/Heizemännche (pl. Heizemänncher), while Heinzelmännchen is the normalized High German form.

A two-pronged theory on the origin of the name was proposed by Marianne Rumpf (1976), first from the form "Heinzelmännlein" as a colloquial name for mandrake dolls, which evolved into lore about them acting as animated house spirits. Secondly, other than being a personal name, "Heinze" or "Heinzen-kunst" was the name for a water-draining contraption in the Erzgebirge mining region of Saxony. By extrapolation, its operators could have also been called Heinz, according to Rumpf.

== Weyden (1826) ==
This legend of the Heinzelmännchen was first written down by the Cologne teacher Ernst Weyden (1805–1869) in 1826. It was translated into English by Thomas Keightley and published 1828 in his book The Fairy Mythology.

Weyden's account opens thus:

Es mag noch nicht über fünfzig Jahre seyn, daß in Cöln die sogenannten Heinzelmännchen ihr abentheuerliches Wesen trieben. Kleine nackende Männchen waren es, die allerhand thaten, Brodbacken, waschen und dergleichen Hausarbeiten mehrere; so wurde erzählt; doch hatte sie Niemand gesehen

— Weyden (1826) Cöln's Vorzeit
Translation:

It is not over fifty years since the Heinzelmännchen, as they are called, used to live and perform their exploits in Cologne. They were little naked mannikins, who used to do all sorts of work; bake bread, wash, and such like house-work. So it is said but no one ever saw them.

— Keightley (1828) Fairy Mythology

While the lore of the Heinzelmännchen in the city of Cologne was very much alive until c. 1780 according to Weyden, everything about the sprite before that time remains completely in the dark. Weyden seems to have begun his "restoration" effort around 1821.

== Kopisch's ballad (1836) ==
In 1836 the painter and poet August Kopisch published a poem beginning with the words: (also reprinted in his 1848 anthology ), which became immensely popular and garnered the poet his fame. The opening lines run thus:

Wie war zu Cölln es doch vordem
Mit Heinzelmännchen so bequem!
Denn war man faul, ... man legte sich
Hin auf die Bank und pflegte sich.
Da kamen bei Nacht, eh' man's gedacht,
Die Männlein und schwärmten
Und klappten und lärmten
Und rupften
Und zupften
Und hüpften und trabten
Und putzten und schabten –
Und eh' ein Faulpelz noch erwacht,
war all sein Tagwerk ... bereits gemacht!...

Translation:

Once upon a time in Cologne,
how comfortable it was with the Heinzelmen!
For if you were lazy, ... you just lay down
on your bench and took care of yourself.
Then at night, before one knew it, came
the little men and swarmed
and clattered and rattled
and plucked
and picked
and jumped and trotted
and cleaned and scoured –
and even before a lazy bum awoke,
all his daily work was ... already done! ...

It has been asserted that the "literary" lore of Heinzelmännchen only became widely known through Kopisch's poem.

== Criticism ==
Folklorist Marianne Rumpf (1976) argued that the oral origins material Ernst Weyden (1826) compiled was essentially the sole source Kopisch used to craft his ballad. Some of the underlying assumption, such as Weyden must have owned a considerable library of folkloric writings while Kopisch had none such, has been challenged by Heribert A. Hilgers. Hilgers considers Weyden's effort to be a "restoration" of the Heinzelmännchen story begun in 1821.

In the HdA or Handwörterbuch des deutschen Aberglaubens, contributor Lily Weiser-Aall classed the Heinzelmännchen as a "literary name" type of "kobold", crediting Kopisch for its fame.

== Popular culture ==
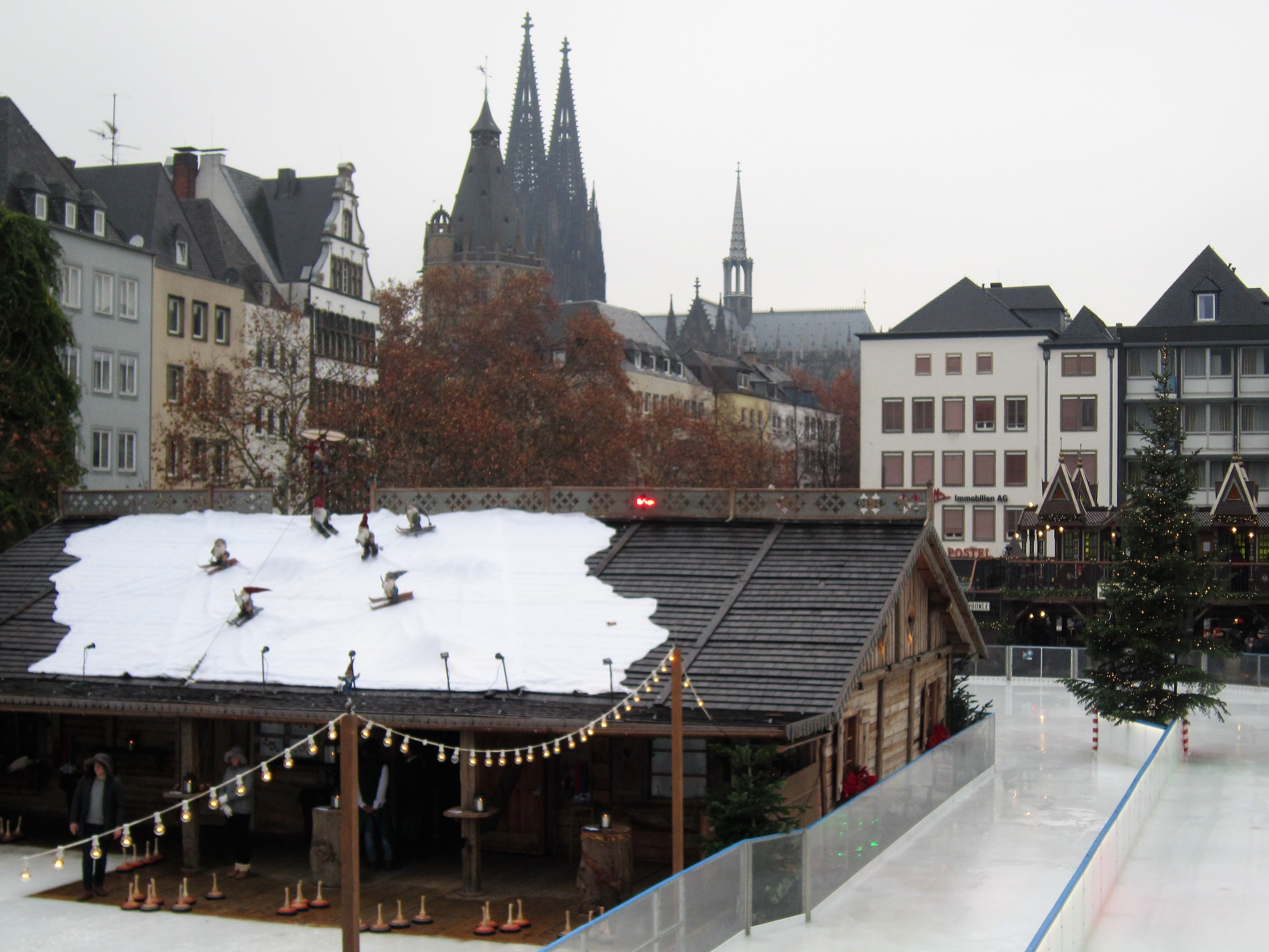
Heinzelmännchen skiing on the rooftop. ―Köln Heinzels Wintermärchen]

Figures of Heinzelmännchen are is featured in various situations at Cologne's annual Christmas season markets held at the Heumarkt and the Alter Markt square (the "Heinzels Wintermärchen").

=== Monuments ===
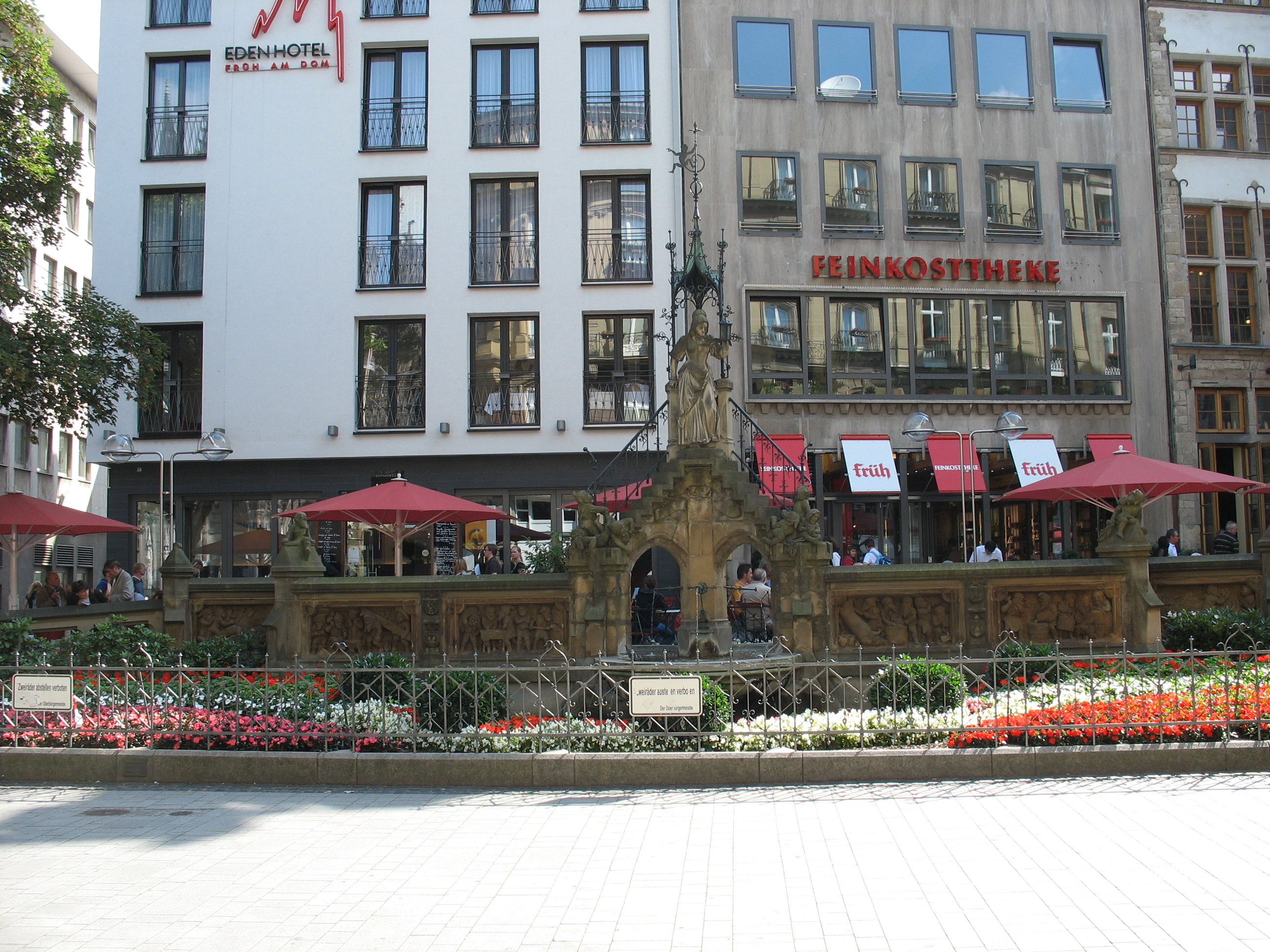
Heinzelmännchenbrunnen fountain

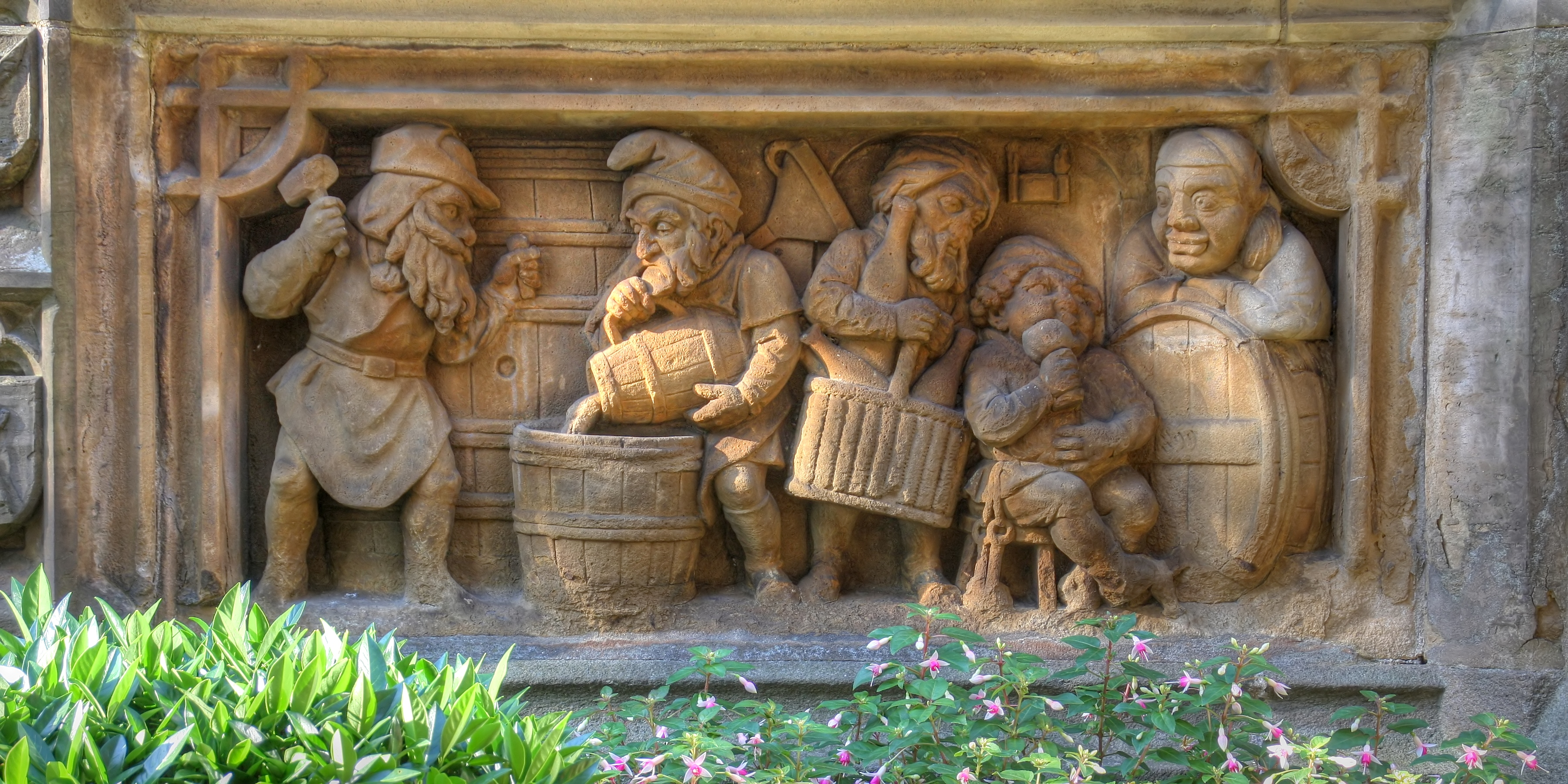
Detail of the Heinzelmännchenbrunnen

In Cologne, a fountain (Heinzelmännchenbrunnen) was installed on Straße Am Hof, near the Cologne Cathedral and the city's oldest brewery, the Früh. The fountain commemorates the Heinzelmännchen and the inquisitive tailor's wife, and was constructed 1897–1900 by the sculptor Heinrich Renard and his father Edmund Renard (the Elder). The tailor's wife sculpture was later replaced with a replica, while the original is held in display at Cologne Zeughaus (armoury).

=== Musical adaptations ===
The words were set to music by the German Lieder composer Carl Loewe, who published his "Die Heinzelmännchen" (the brownies), opus 83, in 1841.

A carnival song about dedicated helpers "Heinzemänncher" was authored by Johannes Matthias Firmenich for the year 1844.

== Eilenburg legend ==
The legend about the "little folk" localized in Eilenburg, Saxony (Des kleinen Volkes Hochzeitsfest, Grimms Deutsche Sagen No. 31) has inspired that city to promote their own Heinzelmännchen, including a mascot parodically named "Heinz Elmann".

== See also ==
- Brownie – Scotland and England
- House-Elves
- Domovoi/Domowoj – Slavic
- Dwarf
- Elf
- Gnome – Mythological creature
- Gütel – Germany
- Heimchen – Germany
- Household deity
- Jack o' the bowl
- Kobold – Germany
- Koro-pok-guru – Japan

- Lares – Roman
- Niß Puk – Schleswig, Denmark/Germany
- Perkeo of Heidelberg
- Petermännchen – Mecklenburg
- Sprite
- The Tailor of Gloucester
- Tomte or Nisse (folklore) – Scandinavia
- Tonttu or Haltija – Finland
- Vættir – Old Scandinavia
- Wirry-cow
