= Bonk =

Bonk may refer to:

== People ==
- Bonk (surname)

== Arts and entertainment ==
- Bonk (series), a caveman character and video game series
- Bonk!, a soft drink company in the first-person shooting game Team Fortress 2
- Bonk (album), an album by Big Pig
- Bonk, an early 1980s new wave band fronted by vocalist Barry Flynn of the Big Supreme
- Bonk Business, a fictional corporation

== Other uses ==
- Bonk: The Curious Coupling of Science and Sex, a 2008 book by Mary Roach
- 14965 Bonk, a main-belt asteroid
- Bonk (audio format) supported by fre:ac (formerly known as BonkEnc)
- The bonk, or hitting the wall, sudden fatigue and loss of energy in endurance sports

== See also ==
- Bonken, a Dutch card game
- Bonkers (disambiguation)
- Boink, a magazine of erotica
