= Tuppen =

Tuppen may refer to:

- Tuppen (film), a 1981 Swedish film
- Tuppen (card game), a popular northwest German card game
