= Gilbert Trathnigg =

Austrian archaeologist

- Born: 26 April 1911; Wiener Neustadt, Austria-Hungary
- Died: 25 September 1970 (aged 59); Ancona, Italy

Academic background
- Education: University of Vienna
- Doctoral advisor: Rudolf Much

Academic work
- Discipline: Archaeology; Philology; Prehistory
- Institutions: University of Vienna
- Main interests: Germanic peoples; Germanic religion

Gilbert Trathnigg (29 April 1911 – 25 September 1970) was an Austrian archaeologist and philologist who specialized in Germanic studies.

== Biography ==
Gilbert Trathnigg was born in Wiener Neustadt, Austria-Hungary on 26 April 1911. His father, Fritz Trathnigg, was a high school teacher and Germanic studies scholar, and had a strong influence on the scholarly interest of the young Gilbert. Growing up in Sankt Pölten, Trathnigg studied German philology, prehistory and folklore at the University of Vienna, where he received his Ph.D. in 1934 under the supervision of Rudolf Much. His thesis concerned the names of East Germanic peoples.

After gaining his Ph.D., Trathnigg continued his scholarly career at the Institute of Austrian Historical Research. He received a scholarship from the Notgemeinschaft der Deutschen Wissenschaft in 1935–1936, and worked as a research assistant at the Museum für Vor- und Frühgeschichte from 1936 to 1938. Trathnigg was a member of the SS, and was since 1938 affiliated with the Ahnenerbe. During World War II, Trathnigg served in the Wehrmacht. After the war, Trathnigg worked as a clerk, archivist, research assistant and museum director in Vöcklabruck and Wels. He was an honorary curator of the Federal Monuments Office since 1954, and a corresponding member of the Österreichisches Archäologisches Institut in 1961. He carried out archaeological excavations throughout Austria, and published a number of articles in scholarly journals. In 1967 he was made a professor. Trathnigg died in Ancona, Italy on 25 September 1970.

== See also ==
- Herbert Jankuhn
- Hans Reinerth
- Gustaf Kossinna

== Selected works ==
- mit Joseph Otto Plassmann (Hrsg.): Deutsches Land kehrt heim. Ostmark und Sudetenland als germanischer Volksboden. Ahnenerbe-Stiftung Verlag, Berlin 1939.
- Die Religion der Germanen. In: Werner Müller, Gilbert Trathnigg: Religionen der Griechen, Römer und Germanen. Leitner, Wunsiedel 1954.
- mit Kurt Holter: Wels von der Urzeit bis zur Gegenwart. Friedhuber, Wien 1964. 2. Auflage: Welsermühl, Wels 1985.

== Sources ==
- Kurt Holter: Gilbert Trathnigg. In: Jahrbuch des Musealvereins Wels. Band 16, Wels 1969/70, S. 11–16.
- Georg Wacha: Gilbert Trathnigg. In: Jahrbuch des Oberösterreichischen Musealvereines. Band 116, Linz 1971, S. 9–12, PDF (1,1 MB) auf ZOBODAT
- Bernd-A. Rusinek: "Wald und Baum in der arisch-germanischen Geistes- und Kulturgeschichte" – Ein Forschungsprojekt des "Ahnenerbe" der SS 1937–1945. In: Albrecht Lehmann, Klaus Schriewer (Hrsg.): Der Wald – Ein deutscher Mythos? Perspektiven eines Kulturthemas. Berlin/Hamburg 2000, S. 267–363, Volltext bes. S. 66–68 Archived 2021-01-25 at the Wayback Machine (PDF; 483 kB).
- Das Berliner Museum für Vor- und Frühgeschichte. Festschrift zum 175-jährigen Bestehen. In: Acta praehistorica et archaeologica. 36/37, Berlin 2005, S. 564–565.
