= Minge =

Minge may refer to:

== Places ==
- Mingə, Azerbaijan
- Mingė, Lithuania

== Slang uses ==
- Vulva (in Commonwealth English)
  - Female pubic hair
- Midge, an insect (in U.S. English)

== Other uses ==
- Minge (surname), people so named
- Revolutionary Committee of the Kuomintang (Chinese: 民革; pinyin: Minge), a minor political party in China

== See also ==
- Ming (disambiguation)
- Menzies (disambiguation)
