= Nürnberger Künstlerlexikon =

German biographical dictionary

The Nürnberger Künstlerlexikon with the undertitle Bildende Kunst, Kunsthandwerker, Gelehrte, Sammler, Kulturschaffende und Mäzene vom 12. bis zur Mitte des 20. Jahrhunderts is a biographical dictionary on the art of the city Nuremberg.

The encyclopaedia, edited by Manfred H. Grieb and written by him with the collaboration of numerous specialist scholars, was published in 2007 in four volumes in a slidecase by K. G. Saur Verlag. At the same time, the work was published in PDF by Verlag Walter de Gruyter, to which K. G. Saur Verlag has belonged since 2006. About the Allgemeines Künstlerlexikon: It is also accessible online for a fee.

== Bibliographical data ==
Source.

- Nürnberger Künstlerlexikon. Bildende Künstler, Kunsthandwerker, Gelehrte, Sammler, Kulturschaffende und Mäzene vom 12. bis zur Mitte des 20. Jahrhunderts. Edited by Manfred H. Grieb. Unter Mitarbeit zahlreicher Fachgelehrter. K. G. Saur Verlag, Munich 2007, ISBN 3-598-11763-9; ISBN 978-3-598-11763-3
  - Vol. 1: A – G, LVIII, 535 S.
  - Vol. 2: H – Pe, S. 540–1133
  - Vol. 3: Pf – Z, S. 1138–1740
  - Vol. 4: Register; Glossar, S. 1745–2046

== Reviews ==
- Sabine Graichen, in Aus dem Antiquariat Zeitschrift für Antiquare und Büchersammler 2008, Nr. 5, pp. 344–345.
- John Roger Paas, in German Studies Review vol. 31, Nr. 2, 2008, p. 418.
- Klaus Schreiber, in Informationsmittel für Bibliotheken Informationsmittel (IFB). Digitales Rezensionsorgan für Bibliothek und Wissenschaft (Numerized).
- Alexander Seelos, in Mitteilungen des Vereins für Geschichte der Stadt Nürnberg Vol. 94, 2007, pp. 328–333 (Numerized).
- Georg Wacha: Rezensionen. Manfred H. Grieb, Nürnberger Künstlerlexikon. In Jahrbuch des Oberösterreichischen Musealvereines. Vol. 152, Linz 2007, pp. 320–323 (Numerized on ZOBODAT).
