= Siebenschräm =

German card game

Schröömen
- The highest card in each suit is the 10
- Origin: Germany
- Alternative names: numerous – see text
- Type: Plain-trick
- Players: 2–8 (4 usual)
- Cards: 32
- Deck: French-suited Skat pack
- Rank (high→low): 10 9 8 7 A K Q J

Related games
- Toepen

Siebenschräm, Sibbeschröm or Schröömen is a fast-paced, German card game from the Eifel region that is unusual in that the winner of the last trick wins the hand. It may be played by two to eight players, but four is normal.

Siebenschräm has been played for over two centuries and is part of the pub culture of the Eifel region, but is also popular elsewhere in the Rhineland where it is usually called Tuppen. Since 1982, there have been competitions such as the Rhineland Championship. It is also referred to as 'Eifel Poker'.

== Names ==
The name Siebenschräm (Note: Pronounced "zeeben shraym".) means sieben Striche or "seven strokes" and refers to the seven oblique lines (///////) chalked on a slate to keep score; thus it is sometimes written 7-Schräm. It is played under the name of Siwweströöm or Sibbeschröm in the county of Oberbergischer Kreis in the Eifel and in Gelsdorf-Grafschaft, and as Tuppen in the north Eifel, Rhineland and on the Lower Rhine.

Other local dialect names and spellings include: Sebbeschröm, Sebbe Schröhm (in Mechernich), Sibbe Schrähm, Sibbe Schräm, Sibbe Schröm, Siwwe Schröhm, Siweström, Siwwe Strööm, Siwwe Schrähm, Siwwe Schräm, Schröm and Schrööm. It is also jocularly referred to as Eifelpoker.

In Neunkirchen-Seelscheid, northeast of Bonn, the game is also known as Pour Vous, (Note: Pronounced "poower voos".) which means "for you". This term suggests that the card game was spread to the Rhineland by French soldiers when they occupied in from 1794 to 1813. In Düsseldorf, as elsewhere in the Rhineland, the game is called Tuppen, because players tap (tuppen) on the table to raise to 2 and 3.

== History ==
Siebenschräm goes back over 200 years in the German Rhineland and has long been a popular pub game in the Eifel region. It was recorded in 1877 in a Cologne dialect dictionary as an "old German card game", and an 1849 short story "from the Lower Rhine" by Gottfried Kinkel which describes Sibbeschröm being played "for the highest stakes." However, the game was known as early as 1811 when Sibbe Schröm or Tuppen was played for low stakes in the city of Cologne.

Like similar games, Siebenschräm was sometimes criticised as a gambling game. For example, at the turn of the 20th century, a number of workers' wives from a town in the county of Daun complained to the mayor that their menfolk played cards excessively and often gambled away their entire week's earnings. In those days, workers' wages still paid in cash on Friday afternoons, a practice that continued into the decades immediately after the Second World War. On this occasion, the mayor may have been approached in his capacity as a sheriff to intervene against the practice. In a circular, he asked the innkeepers to stop this "evil", probably regarding Siebenschräm as a gambling game.

In another incident, in 1910, a complaint was made against an innkeeper for tolerating such a game of chance. The local court decided to acquit the defendant, because he had not been aware that it was a such a game (and thus a gambling game in the eyes of German law). But ignorance is no defence in law and so the case went to a higher court in Trier, where the public prosecutor argued that it was an offence within the meaning of §284 StGB (gambling) and applied for a 5 Reichsmark fine. The court, however, was not convinced. The accused innkeeper and three players summoned as witnesses were invited to play a game of Siebenschräm "as a general pastime", "whereby the individual players knocked as if they were sitting at their regulars' table in their home village". As a result, the regional court ruled that Siebenschräm was not a game of chance and acquitted the accused; for it found that "in the case of Sieben-Schräm, the outcome depends less on luck than on skilful play".

In 1986, the game came under scrutiny again causing the 5th Rhineland Championship to be postponed while a judicial review by the Rhineland-Palatinate Ministry of Justice considered whether it was gambling. They ruled that it only became a prohibited game of chance if the prizes were substantial, but that local competitions could be held if the prizes consisted of trophies or medal and the entry fees were designed to cover the costs.

In the region around Ahrweiler, Siebenschräm was indispensable part of the Easter celebration of Osterkranz.

== Rules ==
=== Siebenschräm (Rhineland Championship) ===
The following is a summary of the Rhineland Championship rules for Siebenschräm.

==== Overview ====
Four players play with a standard 32-card, French-suited Skat pack. The cards rank in descending order as follows: 10 > 9 > 8 > 7 > A > K > Q > J. Thus the 10s are the highest in suit and the Jacks, the lowest. Each player starts with seven marks or Schräm on the scoresheet. (Note: Schräm (pronounced "shraym") is both singular and plural.)

==== Deal and play ====
The dealer shuffles the pack and places it in front of the player to the right for cutting. There must be at least 4 cards in each packed of the cut. The dealer then deals 4 cards each, clockwise and either singly or in packets of 2, beginning with forehand. The rest are set aside, face down, and are not used in that particular hand. In a tournament, player 4 always deals for the first hand of a series, thereafter the winner of the hand deals for the next hand.

Forehand leads to the first trick with any card. Players must follow suit if possible; otherwise may discard any card. The highest card of the led suit wins the trick and the trick winner leads to the next trick. The taker of the fourth and last trick wins the hand. The three losers each have a mark (/) or Schräm crossed off on the scoresheet; the winner keeps his score.

==== Knocking ====
Each hand has a basic value of 1 mark or Schräm. During play, this may be raised to 2 at any time by any player 'knocking'. (Note: The rules do not say what knocking is, but in other descriptions it is a knock on the table and/or an announcement such as "I'm knocking 3".) In this way, players may raise or re-raise by 1 mark each time up to a maximum of 7 marks. However, a player may not knock twice in succession, nor may a player knock for more marks than his current score. Exception: a player with two marks may knock for three.

As soon as a player knocks, play stops and the opponents of the knocker must now say, in turn and in clockwise order, whether they will stay in the game or pass. Those remaining in, play at the new game value; those who pass must drop out and place their cards face down in the middle of the table; their score is reduced by the number of marks equal to the old game value. For example, suppose each player has 6 marks and the value of the current hand stands at 3. Hubert knocks for 4; Gerda and Hans drop out, but Anne decides to play on and she wins. Gerda and Hans lose 3 marks, Hubert 4 marks and Anne none. The scores are now: Hubert 2, Gerda and Hans 3, and Anne 6.

Players may knock 'unseen' or 'dark' before looking at their cards up to a maximum of 3 knocks in total (game value = 4); thereafter they must knock 'light' i.e. after viewing their cards.

A player with only one mark left is 'poor' (arm or hammer) must knock for 2 (unseen) before play starts.

==== Scoring and winning ====
Each player starts with seven marks or Schräm on the scoresheet which are crossed out as the game progresses whenever the player loses. A player who has lost all seven marks drops out of the game while the others continue. The last player left in with marks is the winner and scores 1 point per mark plus a bonus of 7 points for the win.

==== Tournament play ====
In tournaments, players play five series of five games and the player with the most marks at the end is the winner.

=== Schrööm ===
The following are the rules for a variant of Schrööm (Note: Pronounced "schrerm".) from Wipperfürth, east of the Rhine in Oberbergischer Kreis.

All is as in the Rhineland Championship rules, except for the following differences or extra details:

- Two to eight may play, each being dealt 4 cards.
- The winner of a hand is the dealer for the next one.
- Each player starts on seven points indicated by matches or dice.
- Players knock by saying e.g. "I'll knock two" (ich klopf' zwei). In response players announce that they will "hold" (halte) or "walk away" (geh' weg).
- Players may knock up to one point higher than their current total.
- A player with only 1 point left must announce this before play by saying "See my hammer?" (Seht ihr meinen Hammer?) which players may accept by saying "Yep, I see your hammer!" (Jo, ich seh deinen Hammer!).

The following special rules apply:

- Four Courts. A player dealt four court cards (any A, K, Q or J) may discard the hand face down before the first trick and draw four new ones from the stock. Any opponent may reveal three of the cards without penalty. If a numeral card is turned up (7, 8, 9, 10), the player who exchanged loses a point. The fourth card may be turned, but if it turns out to be another court card, the opponent who turned it loses a point.
- Round. A player whose hand cards total more than 37 buys a round of Kölsch.
- Pretty Ones. If the players left in are 'hammers' (have only 1 point left each), one of them may ask "shall we have pretty ones?" (Sollen wir hübschen?). If the others agree, the requester reshuffles the pack and deals afresh.

In nearby Marienheide, Schrööm is played by two to five players, each receiving four cards. Players only receive 5 points and the score is kept on a die. The winner of a hand deals for the next, except that once a game is finished and everyone starts again with 5 points, the loser of the previous game deals first in the next. Players may knock up to one point higher than their current tally. The lead is passed clockwise if the person on lead drops out. If they drop out as a result of knocking, the player with the highest card in the current trick leads to the next. For this purpose the suits rank in the order ♣ > ♠ > ♥ > ♦, the cards retaining their ranking within each suit.

=== Siwwe Strööm, Sibbeschröm ===
In the Eifel (Siwwe Streöm in the Moselle Franconian south; Sibbeschröm in the Ripuarian north) and Lower Rhine variants of the game, points are counted forward, i.e. each player starts with zero and is eliminated on reaching seven. A player who reaches 6 points is automatically 'knocked' (known as being 'hammer'), i.e. must play for two points. An opponent who does not want to play at the higher stake places the cards on the table before the deal starts at the cost of 1 point.

At the start of a round, a player may exchange the entire hand for a new one if it contains only court cards (Jack, Queen, King, Ace). This is done clandestinely, so that, in theory, a player could exchange a hand that does not just contain courts. The exchange must be announced. If there is a suspicion that the exchanged hand did not just contain courts, it can be uncovered by anyone. If the hand contains only courts, the player who turned them is eliminated from the round and chalks up 2 penalty points. However, if the suspicion was correct and the hand did not contain only courts, the player who switched hands will be eliminated from the round with 2 penalty points.

=== Sebbe Schröhm ===
A variant called Sebbe Schröhm is played in Neunkirchen-Seelscheid in the mountainous Rhein-Sieg-Kreis. At the start of a game, each player chalks a Roman XII on a white-washed table or a slate tablet. The scoring system is as follows: for the 1st point, a line is drawn through the middle of the X. There are now 4 strokes left on the X together with the two on the Roman II, making a total of 6 schröhm, which are erased one by one as further penalty points are scored. Other variations from the Rhine Championship rules include:

- Four Courts. A player who only has courts may exchange them for four new ones.
- Raise to 2 and 3. Only a player who is on lead (Op/Auf) may raise. In clockwise order, players fold or hold. Those who fold lose a Schröhm. Those who stay in and win cause the 'raiser' to lose 1, but run the risk of losing 2 Schröhm themselves. In addition to the raiser, players who called 2 can raise to 3. If all pass, the raiser is not obliged to reveal any cards.
- Hammer. A player with one Schröhm left, 'sits on the hammer'. As soon as the first player sits on the hammer, subsequent games are automatically raised to 2.
- Knolle. A player who has lost all 7 Schröhm stays in the game but writes a Knolle (a "O") for each additional lost point and then pays an agreed sum per Knolle to the winner of the game. When the last player sits on the hammer, the overall winner is determined in the next and final game. When there is a winner, all the Knollen are erased and the winner collects the stakes from the other players.

=== Siwwe Schröhm ===
A variant from Dedenbach in Ahrweiler is called Siwwe Schröhm. Newcomers play it at a basic level for 2 to 5 players. If two, three or four play, they are dealt 8 cards each with any remaining cards being set aside; if five play they are dealt 6 cards each. Cards are not placed in the middle to form a trick, but face up in front of the player. (Note: This may be the usual practice, in which case most rules fail to mention it.) There are no points; the winner of the last trick drops out and deals the next hand; this continues until there are two left and the one who fails to take the last trick loses. The game is played in two halves. After both halves have been played, the two players who lost a half enter a play-off in which they are dealt 8 cards each and the one who loses the play-off is the overall loser. If one player loses both halves, there is no play-off and that player is the overall loser. Sometimes that player buys a round of drinks; in other circles, money is paid into a pot which is used to pay for joint events such as meals or tours.

The advanced or classic version is played by four players who receive 4 cards, not 8. The winner of a hand deals for the next one. In a normal game the loser is awarded a mark called a Schröhm. The first player to 7 marks has lost. A player is 'poor' on reaching 6 marks. The main difference from the newcomer's variant is that players may now knock in the usual way to raise the game value and opponents may fold or hold. Otherwise, apart from the fact that marks are accumulated not erased, the rules for knocking are similar to the Rhineland Championship. However, knocking blind is not mentioned nor are any limits given.

=== Tuppen ===
The rules for Tuppen at spielregeln.de are a simplified version of the Rhineland Championship rules for Siebenschräm except that, if two or more players have 6 marks, they play a 'short long one' with 4 cards each and the winner drops out of the round. The last two left in play a 'long one' in which each receives 8 cards (dealt 3–2–3) and the overall loser buys the next round of drinks.

== Tournaments ==
In a tournament, 3 or 4 players each play 10 rounds, starting with 5 points apiece. After that, new tables or pairings are drawn up and another 10 rounds played. After 3 tables, the points won by the participants are added up and the player with the highest score wins.

== Bibliography ==
- Hönig, Fritz; Wahlenberg, Friedrich Wilhelm (1877). Wörterbuch der Kölner Mundart (in German). Cologne: Friedrich Heyn.
- Kinkel, Gottfried (1850). "Der Hauskrieg". Erzählungen (in German). Stuttgart and Tübingen: J.G. Cotta. pp. 77–112.
- Krünitz, Johann Georg (1828). "Schräm". Oekonomische Encyclopädie (in German). Berlin: Pauli.
- Schönhofen, Werner (1996), "Siebenschräm - Ein verbotenes Glückspiel?", Eifeljahrbuch (in German), p. 138
- Weyden, Ernst (1862). Köln am Rhein vor fünfzig Jahren (in German). Cologne: M. DuMont-Schauberg.
