= Nip and tuck =

Nip and tuck may refer to:

- Nip and tuck (cosmetic surgery), a colloquialism for rhytidectomy, a cosmetic surgery to smooth facial wrinkles
- Nip and Tuck, Kentucky, the former name of Artemus, Kentucky
- Nip/Tuck (2003–2010), an American television drama series created by Ryan Murphy
- Twin girls in the 1934 film Girl o' My Dreams
- The former name of Harmony Hill, Texas

== See also ==
- Touch and Go (disambiguation)
