= Lily Weiser-Aall =

Austrian ethnologist

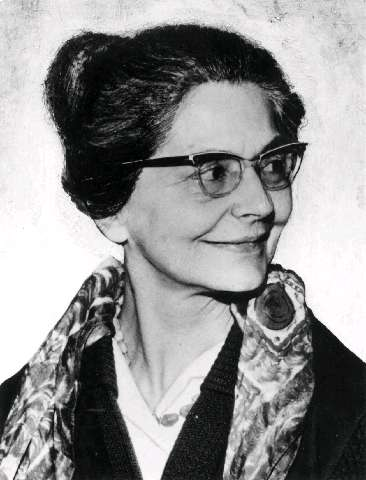
- Born: 18 December 1898; Vienna, Austria-Hungary
- Died: 26 February 1987 (aged 88); Oslo, Norway

Academic background
- Education: University of Vienna
- Doctoral advisor: Rudolf Much
- Other advisor: Eugen Fehrle
- Influences: Otto Höfler; Neil Price

Academic work
- Discipline: Ethnology; Philology
- Institutions: Norwegian Museum of Cultural History
- Main interests: Comitatus; Germanic peoples
- Notable works: Altgermanische Jünglingsweihen und Männerbünde (1927)

Lily Weiser-Aall (18 December 1898 – 26 February 1987), born Elisabeth Augusta Jeanette Weiser, was an Austrian philologist and ethnologist who specialized in Germanic studies.

== Biography ==
Lily Weiser-Aall was born in Vienna, Austria-Hungary on 18 December 1898 to an upper middle class family. Her father was a lawyer and her mother was a singer and pianist. After gaining her abitur, Weiser-Aall studied German and Nordic philology at the University of Vienna under Rudolf Much. She became one of Much's favourite students, and gained her Ph.D. in 1922 under his supervision with a thesis on Yule. Her thesis was published in 1923.

After gaining her Ph.D., Weiser-Aall held an internship at a museum in Hamburg, and worked as a teacher at a Viennese middle school for girls. During this time Weisser-All attended scholarly conferences in Sweden and Italy, where she established contacts with folklorists such as Viktor Geramb and Eugen Fehrle. With Much and Fehrle, Weiser-Aall conducted her post-doctoral thesis, which examined the männerbund among early Germanic peoples. This thesis had a strong influence on subsequent research, particularly that of Otto Höfler and Neil Price.

In 1928, Weiser-Aall married Norwegian philosopher Anathon Aall, and subsequently moved to Oslo. Lily and Anathon had three children. In 1933, Weiser-Aall was awarded the H.M. Kongens gullmedalje by the University of Oslo for the research on religious symbology. During this time Weiser-Aall published a number of articles on witchcraft and magic in scholarly journals. She also became a noted authority on experimental psychology. She was elected a full member of the Norwegian Academy of Science and Letters in 1937.

By World War II, Weiser-Aall had become a widower, and in order to support her three young children she became an associate of the Ahnenerbe, with whom she had been in contact since 1937. She was assigned to the Seminar for Religious Studies at the Reichsuniversität Straßburg under Otto Huth, and tasked with translating specialist Scandinavian literature into German. Weiser-Aall despised Nazism. She helped Jews during the Holocaust and refused to collaborate after being questioned by the SS.

After World War II, Weiser-Aall was a member of Norsk etnologisk gransking and became the senior conservator at Norwegian Museum of Cultural History. She retired in the 1960s. Weiser-Aall died in Oslo on 26 February 1987.

== See also ==
- Nora K. Chadwick
- Lotte Motz
- Bertha Phillpotts
- Hilda Ellis Davidson

== Selected works ==
- Jul, Weihnachtsgeschenke und Weihnachtsbaum. Eine volkskundliche Untersuchung ihrer Geschichte. Stuttgart 1923.
- «Germanische Haustgeister und Kobolde.» Niederdeutsche Zeitschrift für Volkskunde 4, 1926.
- Altgermanische Jünglingsweihen und Männerbünde. Ein Beitrag zur deutschen und nordischen Altertums- und Volkskunde. Bühl 1927.
- «Hexe.» Handwörterbuch des deutschen Aberglaubens. Berlin 1931.
- «Zur Sage vom Hundekönig.» Wiener Prähistorischen Zeitschrift, XIX, 1932.
- «Zur Geschichte der altgermanischen Todesstrafe und Friedlosigkeit.» Archiv für Religionswissenschaft 33, 1933.
- «Zum Aufbau religiöser Symbolerlebnisse.» Zeitschrift für Religionspsychologie 1934.
- «'Verdens uro' i Norge.» Maal og minne 1937.
- Volkskunde und Psychologie. Eine Einführung. Berlin 1937.
- «Weihnacht.» Handwörterbuch des deutschen Aberglaubens. Berlin 1941.
- «Volkskundliche Arbeit in Norwegen, 1942-1946.» Archiv für Volkskunde 44, 1947.
- «Magiske tegn på norske trekar?» By og Bygd 1947.
- Vassbæring i Norge. Småskrifter fra Norsk etnologisk gransking. Oslo 1953.
- Juletreet i Norge. Småskrifter fra Norsk etnologisk gransking. Oslo 1953.
- Julehalmen i Norge. Småskrifter fra Norsk etnologisk gransking. Oslo 1953.
- Julenissen og julegeita i Norge. Småskrifter fra Norsk etnologisk gransking. Oslo 1953.
- Menn med øreringer i Norge. Småskrifter fra Norsk etnologisk gransking. Oslo 1953.
- «Syncretism in Nordic folk medicine. Critical periods during pregnancy.» Scripta instituti donneriani Aboensis, v. 3, 1957.
- «Påskeegg i Norge – kilder og problemer.» By og bygd 1958.
- «Om haren i norsk overlevering – kilder og problemer.» Norveg 10, 1963.
- «Jul.» Kulturhistorisk leksikon for nordisk middelalder 8. København.
- «Gelehrte Tradition über angeborene Fehler in der Volkstradition.» Arv 1962/63.
- Svangerskap og fødsel i nyere norsk tradisjon. Småskrifter fra Norsk etnologisk gransking. Oslo 1968.
- Omkring de nyfødtes stell i nyere norsk overlevering. Småskrifter fra Norsk etnologisk gransking. Oslo 1973.

== Sources ==
- Andreas Ropeid: Lily Weiser-Aall. Minnetale. Det Norske Videnskaps-Akademi Årbok 1987.
- Andreas Ropeid: Lily Weiser-Aall 1898–1987. Ethnologia Scandinavica 1987.
- Ann Helene Bolstad Skjelbred: Lily Weiser-Aall. Norsk etnologisk granskings førstedame. Forskning og fornyelse (By og bygd nr. 45). Oslo 2013.
- Anne Moestue og Reimund Kvideland (red.): Verden var hennes tekst. Forskeren Lily Weiser-Aall. En minnebok 1898–1998. Småskrifter fra Norsk etnologisk gransking. Oslo 1998.
- Anne Moestue: Lily Weiser-Aall og spørrelistearbeidet ved Norsk etnologisk gransking. Oslo 1998.
- Carlo Ginzburg: Germansk mytologi og nazisme. om en gammel bok af Georges Dumézil. Spor. Om historie og historisk metode. København 1999.
- Malte Garsche: Norge og prosjektet Germanische wissenschaftseinsatz. Hans Schwalrn og Ahnenerbes fiasko i Norge 1942-1944. Terje Emberland og Jorunn Sem Fure (red.): Jakten på Germania. Fra nordensvermeri til SS-arkeologi. Oslo 2009.
