= Rudolf Much =

Austrian philologist

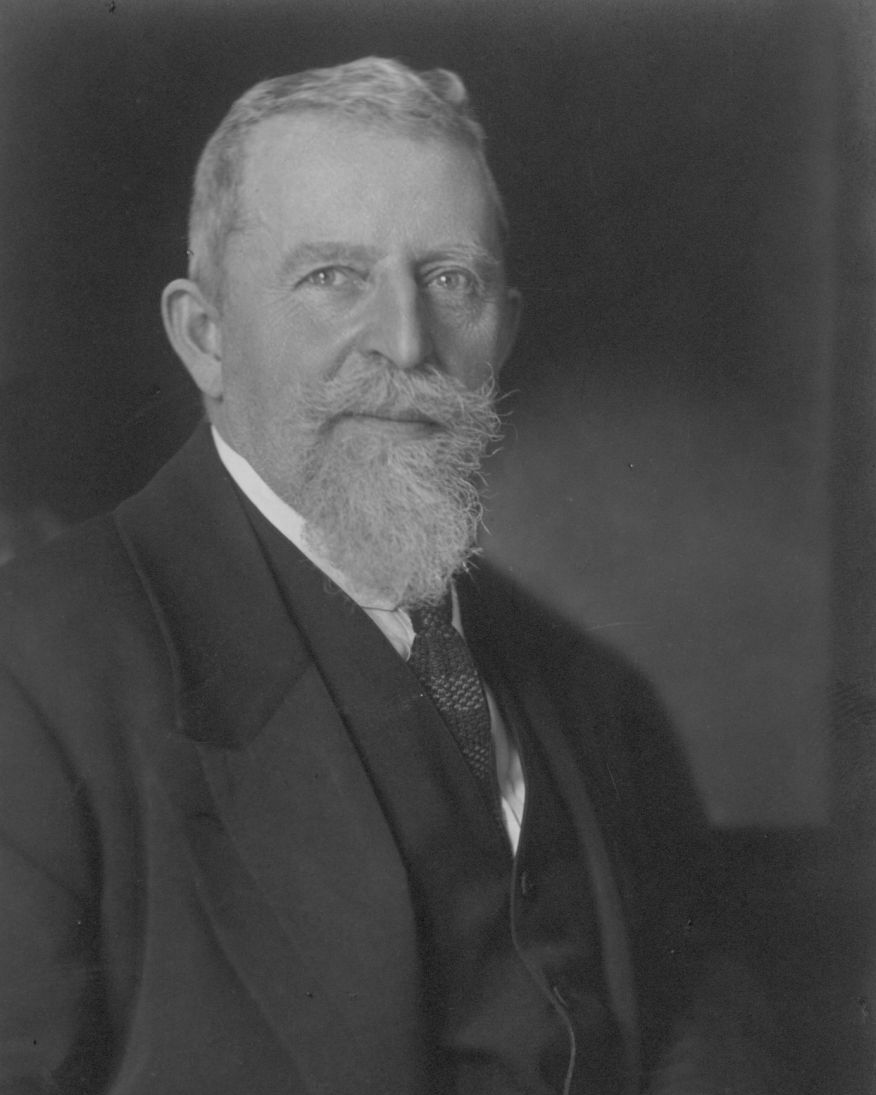
- Born: 7 September 1862; Vienna, Austrian Empire
- Died: 8 March 1936 (aged 73); Vienna, Austria

Academic background
- Education: University of Vienna
- Thesis: Zur Vorgeschichte Deutschlands (1887)
- Academic advisor: Richard Heinzel

Academic work
- Discipline: Classical philology; Germanic philology
- Institutions: University of Vienna
- Notable students: Otto Höfler; Julius Pokorny; Walter Steinhauser; Richard Wolfram; Siegfried Gutenbrunner; Dietrich Kralik; Lily Weiser-Aall; Gilbert Trathnigg; Robert Stumpfl
- Main interests: Germanic Antiquity
- Notable works: Die Germania des Tacitus (1937)

Rudolf Much (7 September 1862 – 8 March 1936) was an Austrian philologist and historian who specialized in Germanic studies. Much was Professor and Chair of Germanic Linguistic History and Germanic Antiquity at the University of Vienna, during which he tutored generations of students and published a number of influential works, some of which have remained standard works up to the present day.

== Biography ==
Rudolf Much was born in Vienna, Austria on 7 September 1862. He was the son of the lawyer Dr. Matthäus Much (1832–1909), who was also a prehistorian. At an early age, Much gained extensive knowledge of ancient history form his father. From 1880 he studied classical philology, German philology and Nordic philology at the University of Vienna. Passing his exams with great distinction, Much gained his PhD in 1887 with the dissertation On the Prehistory of Germany (Zur Vorgeschichte Deutschlands), and completed his habilitation in Germanic studies in 1892–1893 with a thesis on Germania.

Since 1901, was assistant professor of Celtic and Germanic antiquity and Scandinavian language and literature at the University of Vienna. Since, 1904, Much served as associate professor, and then professor of Germanic linguistic history and antiquity (Germanische Sprachgeschichte und Altertumskunde) at the University of Vienna. In this capacity he was also tasked with lecturing on Scandinavian literature. Throughout his academic career, Much served on the committees of many scholarly committees and was the editor of several scholarly journals. He declined to be the editor of the first edition of the Reallexikon der Germanischen Altertumskunde, to which he was nevertheless one of the most important contributors.

Much retired from his chair as professor emeritus in 1934, but continued to lecture at the university. A popular professor, Much acquired a large following of students at the University of Vienna, many of whom would later acquire prominent positions in the field. Students of Wolfram include Otto Höfler, Julius Pokorny, Walter Steinhauser, Richard Wolfram, Siegfried Gutenbrunner, Dietrich Kralik, Eberhard Kranzmayer, Lily Weiser-Aall, Gilbert Trathnigg and Robert Stumpfl. Accordingly, Much's pan-German stance and perceptions had a profound uptake and dissemination in the fields of German ethnology, German dialectology, German linguistics and, most directly, German pre-medieval studies ("Deutsche Altertumskunde") that is lasting, often in unexpressed ways via one of his many students, to the present via an unbroken chain of knowledge transmission.

== Research ==
Much's research centered on Germanic studies. He was particularly interested in Germanic linguistics, Germanic paganism, relationships between the Germanic peoples and Celts, the origins of Germanic peoples, and the origin of the ethnonym Germani.

Much was unsure of the location of the Proto-Indo-European homeland, but sympathized with theories suggesting a north-central European location. He believed Germani had originally been the name of one Germanic tribe, which had subsequently been applied by outsiders to the Germanic peoples as a whole.

Much's Die Germania des Tacitus (1937), is considered the standard work on Germania by Tacitus, and continues to the basis for modern research on this book.

== Personal life ==
Much was a German nationalist. He was in contact with the Pan-German movement of Georg Ritter von Schönerer, and was a member of the Deutsche Gemeinschaft. Much converted from Roman Catholicism to Protestantism in 1893.

Much never joined a political party, as he considered that incompatible with being a scholar. Much opposed the politicization of scholarship, and for this reason, he protested vigorously against appointing Nazis to positions at the University of Vienna. His son, the physician Horand Much, was executed by the Nazis in 1943.

== Selected works ==
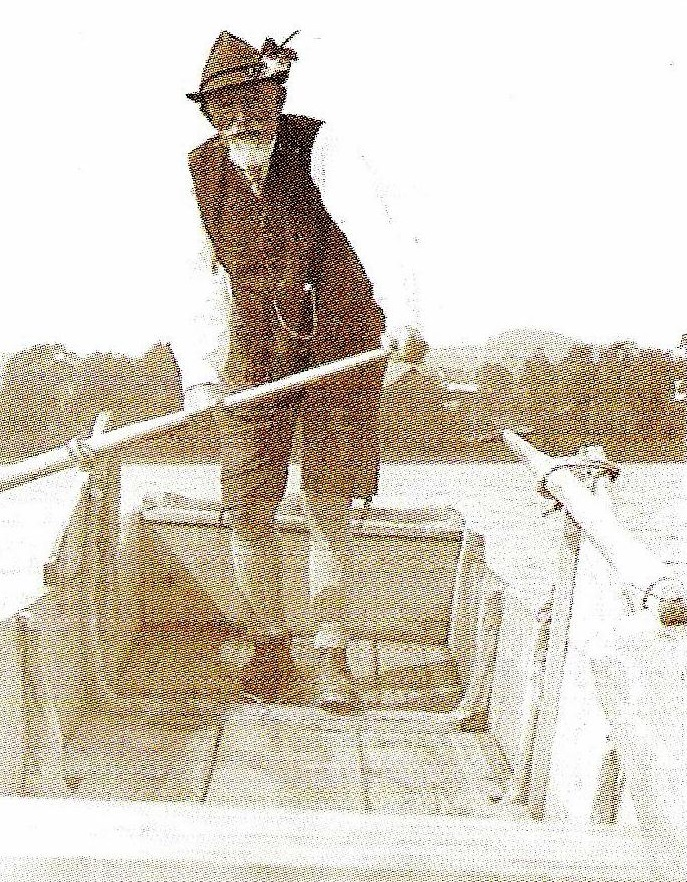
Rudolf Much in a Zille, 1932

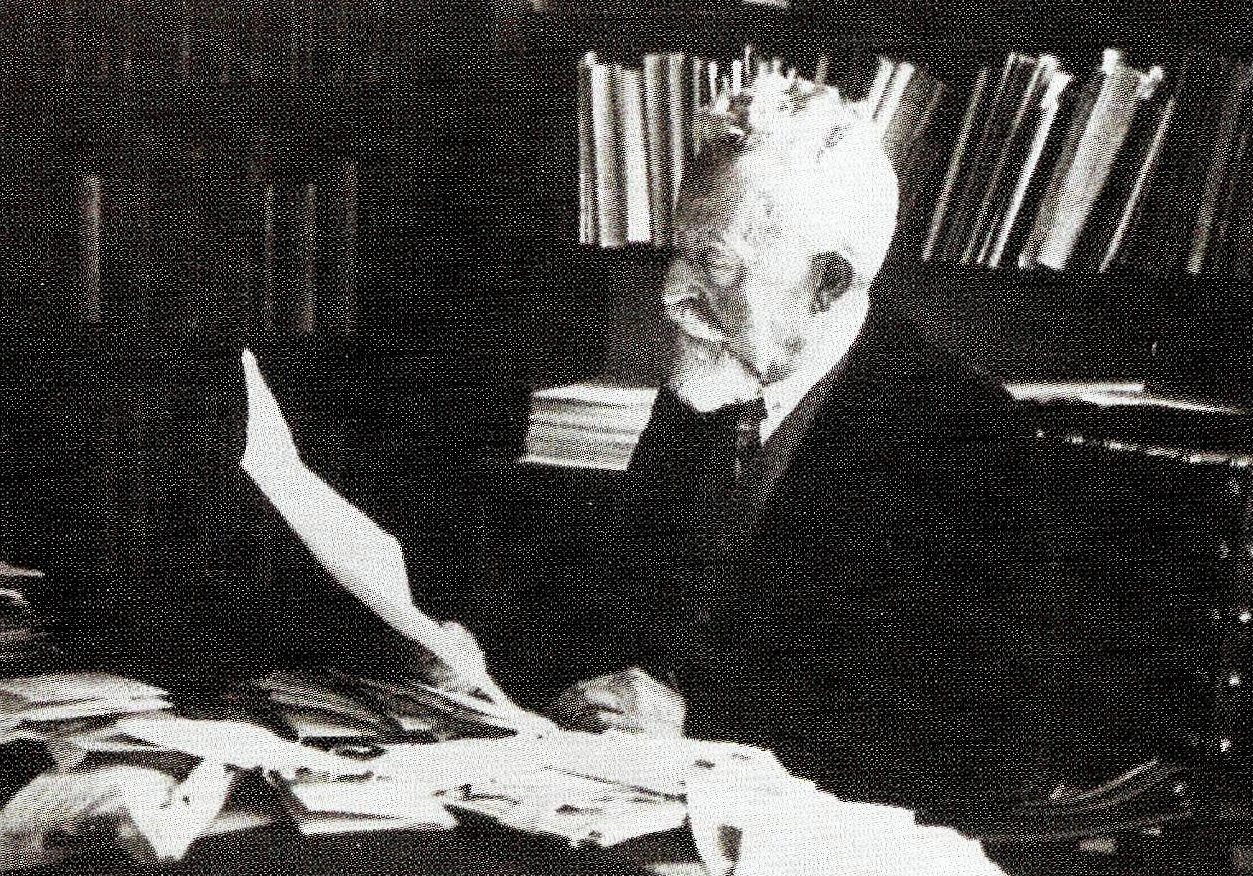
Rudolf Much at work, 1935

- Deutsche Stammsitze − ein Beitrag zur ältesten Geschichte Deutschlands. Niemeyer, Halle a. S. 1892.
- Der germanische Himmelsgott. Niemeyer, Halle a. S. 1898.
- Deutsche Stammeskunde. Göschen, Leipzig, Berlin (u.a.) 1900.
- Der Name Germanen. Hölder, Wien 1920.
- Die Germania des Tacitus, erläutert von Rudolf Much; Winter, Heidelberg 1937, 3. Auflage unter Bearbeitung durch Wolfgang Lange und Herbert Jankuhn, 1967.

== See also ==
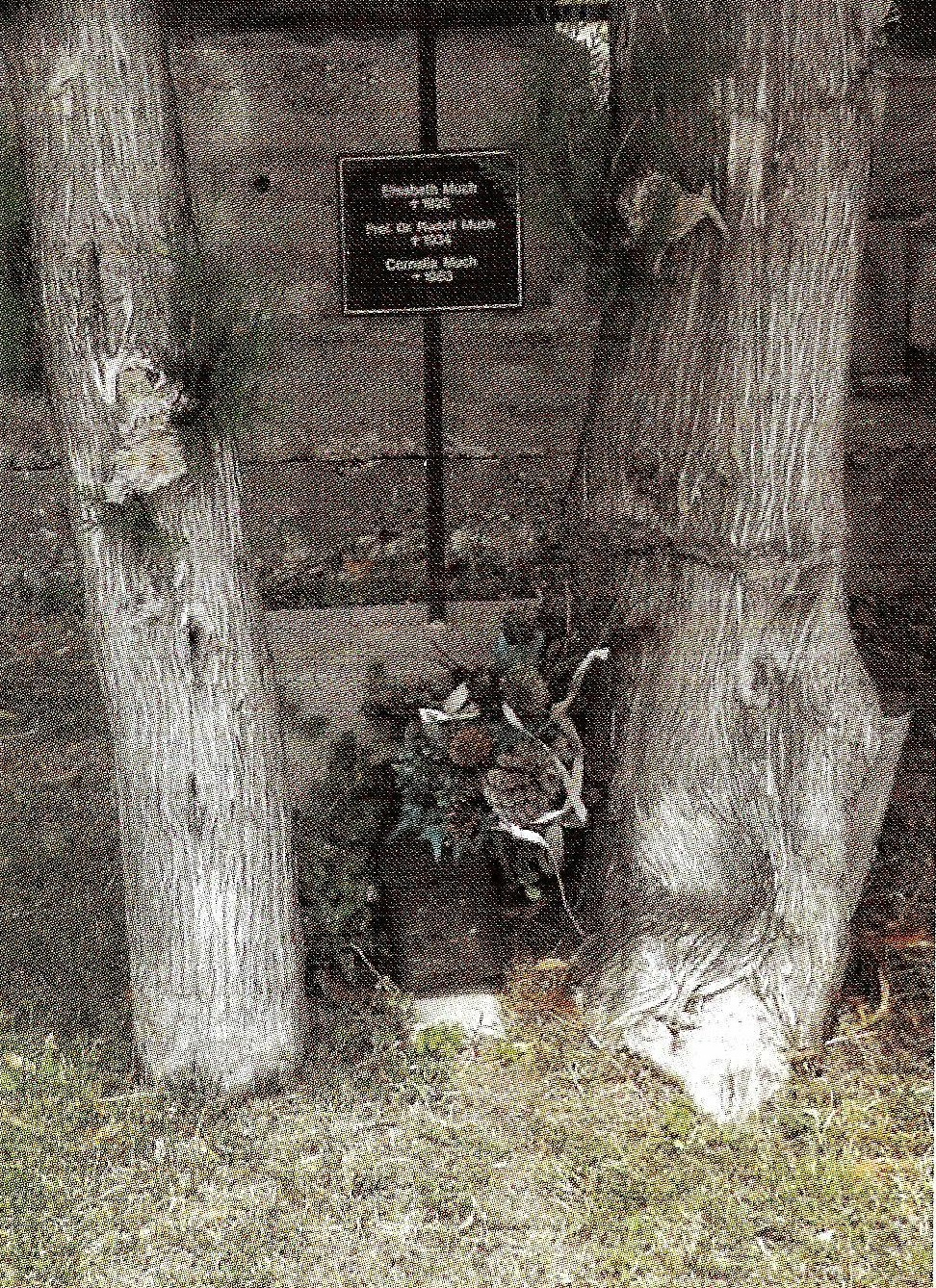
Ehrengrab of Rudolf Much at the Baumgartner Friedhof in Vienna, Austria

- Jan de Vries (philologist)
- Sophus Bugge
- Magnus Olsen
- Birger Nerman
- Gabriel Turville-Petre
- Hermann Güntert
- Edgar C. Polomé
- Gudmund Schütte
- Vilhelm Grønbech
- Hector Munro Chadwick
- Gustaf Kossinna
- Wolfgang Krause
- René Derolez

== Literature ==
- Birkhan, Helmut (2015). "Rudolf Much als Fakultätsmitglied". In Reichert, Hermann; Scheungraber, Corinna (eds.). Germanische Altertumskunde: Quellen, Methoden, Ergebnisse. Akten des Symposiums anlässlich des 150. Geburtstags von Rudolf Much Wien, 28.-30. September 2012. Philologica Germanica (in German). Vol. 35. Fassbaender. pp. 21–86. ISBN 978-3-902575-63-0.
- Reichert, Hermann (2002). "Much". Reallexikon der Germanischen Altertumskunde (in German). Vol. 20. Walter de Gruyter. pp. 273–279. ISBN 3110171643.
- Rudolf Simek (1997). "Much, Rudolf". Neue Deutsche Biographie (in German). Vol. 18. Berlin: Duncker & Humblot. pp. 250–251.
- Rudolf Simek: Rudolf Much. In: Deutsche Biographische Enzyklopädie. K. G. Saur Verlag, München u.a. 1996, ISBN 3-598-23160-1
- Wiesinger, Peter: 150 Jahre Germanistik in Wien, außeruniversitäre Frühgermanistik und Universitätsgermanistik; Peter Wiesinger/Daniel Steinbach, Wien: Ed. Praesens, 2001, 246 S., ISBN 3-7069-0104-8
