= Eugen Fehrle =

German philologist

- Born: 7 August 1880; Stetten, Germany
- Died: 8 May 1957 (aged 76); Heidelberg, Germany

Academic background
- Education: University of Heidelberg

Academic work
- Discipline: Classical philology; Germanic philology
- Institutions: University of Heidelberg
- Main interests: German folklore

Eugen Fehrle (7 August 1880 – 8 May 1957) was a German philologist who specialized in classical and Germanic philology.

== Biography ==
Eugen Ferle was born in Stetten, Germany on 7 August 1880. the son of teacher Johann Fehrle and Martina Wick. He had three siblings. Fehrle gained his abitur in Konstanz and subsequently served in the German Army.

From 1900 to 1907, Fehrle studied classical philology, religious studies and German philology at the University of Heidelberg. He gained his Ph.D. at Heidelberg in 1907 with a thesis on religion in classical antiquity. Fehrle subsequently worked as a teacher, and from 1909 to 1918 he was a lecturer in Greek and Latin at the University of Heidelberg. Fehrle married Erna Küster in 1910, with whom he had two daughters and a son.

Fehrle completed his habilitation in classical philology at Heidelberg in 1913, and subsequently became a privatdozent there. During World War I he served as an officer in the German Army. After the war, Fehrle served as a research assistant and associate professor at Heidelberg. In 1926 he was made co-editor of the journal Volk und Rasse. By this time he was also lecturing on folklore at the University of Heidelberg.

During the early years of the Weimar Republic, Fehrle was a member of the liberal German People's Party, but after a visit to Italy, Fehrle developed an interest in fascism and eventually joined the Nazi Party. In 1934, Fehrle was appointed Professor of Classical Philology at the University of Heidelberg, and was also made a Member of the Heidelberg Academy of Sciences and Humanities. From 1936 to 1945, Fehrle was Chair of Folklore at the University of Heidelberg, and since 1942 he also lectured in religious studies at the university. During this time he served as Director of the German Seminar (1938), Dean of the Philosophical Faculty (1942-1943), and Vice Rector (1944) at Heidelberg. Much of his research was concerned with German folklore and its relationship with Germanic mythology.

After the end of World War II, Fehrle was fired from the University of Heidelberg, expelled from the Heidelberg Academy of Sciences and Humanities and arrested. He was convicted as a fellow traveller in January 1950, and subsequently retired. Fehrle died in Heidelberg on 8 May 1957 and was buried at Friedhof Handschuhsheim.

== See also ==
- Wolfgang Krause
- Friedrich Neumann

== Selected works ==
- Die kultische Keuschheit im Altertum. Töpelmann, Gießen 1910 (= Religionsgeschichtliche Versuche und Vorarbeiten. 6). Unveränd. photomechan. Nachdruck de Gruyter, Berlin 1966 (Inaugural-Dissertation zur Erlangung der Doktorwürde der hohen philosophischen Fakultät der Ruprecht-Karls-Universität in Heidelberg. Erster Teil. 1908).
- Zur Geschichte der griechischen Geoponica. Leipzig 1913 (zugleich Heidelberg, Phil. Habilitations-Schrift, 1913).
- Lateinische Grammatik [Lehrbücher]: Methode Gaspey-Otto-Sauer / Eugen Fehrle; Erwin Pfeiffer. Neu bearb. von Franz Wagner [Mehrteiliges Werk], Groos, Heidelberg 1934–1967
- Deutsche Feste und Volksbräuche. Teubner, Leipzig/Berlin 1916 (Aus Natur und Geisteswelt; Bdch. 518).
- Studien zu den griechischen Geoponikern. Teubner, Leipzig/Berlin 1920.
- Heimatkunde in der Schule. C. F. Müller, Karlsruhe 1920 (gemeinsam mit Konrad Guenther).
- Zauber und Segen. E. Diederichs, Jena 1926 (gehört zu Deutsche Volkheit 29).
- Badische Volkskunde. 1924. Unveränd. Nachdruck Weidlich, Frankfurt/Main 1979.
- Vom Wesen der Volkskunst. H. Stubenrauch, Berlin 1926 (Jahrbuch für historische Volkskunde; Bd. 2 zusammen Sigurd Erixon; Hans Fehr).
- Germania : Latein. u. deutscher Text, gegenübergestellt / Publius Cornelius Tacitus. Hrsg., übers. u. mit Bemerkgn vers. von Eugen Fehrle, J. F. Lehmanns Verl., München 1929 (mehrfach aufgelegt).
- Deutsche Feste und Jahresbräuche. Teubner, Leipzig/Berlin 1937.
- Deutsche Hochzeitsbräuche, Diederichs. Jena 1937.
- Das Wesen des Volkes. Industrieverl. Spaeth & Linde 1937 (gehört zu Grundlagen, Aufbau und Wirtschaftsordnung des national-sozialistischen Staates; Beitr. 11).
- Deutsches Volkstum im Elsass. Junker u. Dünnhaupt, Berlin 1941 (gehört zu Deutsches Institut für Außenpolitische Forschung (Berlin): Schriften des Deutschen Instituts für Außenpolitische Forschung und des Hamburger Instituts für Auswärtige Politik; H. 92).
- Feste und Volksbräuche im Jahreslauf europäischer Völker. Hinnenthal, Kassel 1955.

== Sources ==
- Peter Assion: Eugen Fehrle (1880-1957). In: Badische Biographien, Neue Folge, Band 1, Stuttgart 1982, S. 112–114.
- Michael Grüttner: Biographisches Lexikon zur nationalsozialistischen Wissenschaftspolitik (= Studien zur Wissenschafts- und Universitätsgeschichte. Band 6). Synchron, Heidelberg 2004, ISBN 3-935025-68-8, S. 46.
- Wilhelm Kühlmann: Germanistik und Deutschkunde. In: Wolfgang U. Eckart, Volker Sellin, Eike Wolgast (Hrsg.): Die Universität Heidelberg im Nationalsozialismus. Springer Verlag, Berlin 2006, ISBN 3-540-21442-9.
- Ernst Klee: Das Personenlexikon zum Dritten Reich. 2. Auflage, Fischer, Frankfurt am Main 2007, ISBN 978-3-596-16048-8.
- Rudolf Vierhaus, ed. (3 May 2011). "Fehrle, Eugen". Deutsche Biographische Enzyklopädie (DBE) (2., überarb. und erweiterte Auflage. Band 3: Einstein–Görner. De Gruyter / K. G. Saur, Berlin / Boston / München 2006 ed.). p. 251. ISBN 978-3-11-094655-0.
- "Eugen Fehrle (1880-1957), 1. Vorsitzender 1938-41". Heidelberger Kunstverein.
