= Minger =

Minger may refer to:

- Pete Minger (1943–2000), American jazz musician
- Rudolf Minger (1881–1955), Swiss politician
- Minger Email Address Verification Protocol
- Piz Mingèr, mountain

== See also ==
- Minge (disambiguation)
