= Bonkers =

Bonkers may refer to:

== Television ==
- Bonkers (American TV series), a 1993–1994 animated series
- Bonkers (British TV series), 2007 comedy
- Bonkers!, a 1979 British TV show
- "Bonkers" (The Price Is Right), a game segment

== Music ==
- "Bonkers" (song), a song by Dizzee Rascal and Armand Van Helden
- Bonkers (compilation album series), a happy hardcore compilation album series

== Other ==
- Bonkers! (game), a race-style board game
- Bonkers (Sega video game)
- Bonkers (SNES video game)
- Bonkers candy, by Nabisco

== See also ==
- Bonk (disambiguation)
