= Siegfried Gutenbrunner =

Austrian philologist

- Photograph of Siegfried Gutenbrunner in 1972
- Born: 26 May 1906; Vienna, Austria-Hungary
- Died: 23 November 1984 (aged 78); Freiburg, Germany

Academic background
- Education: University of Vienna
- Academic advisor: Rudolf Much

Academic work
- Discipline: Germanic philology
- Institutions: University of Vienna; University of Kiel; Reichsuniversität Straßburg; University of Freiburg
- Main interests: Germanic Antiquity

Siegfried Gutenbrunner (26 May 1906 – 23 November 1984) was an Austrian philologist who specialized in Germanic studies.

== Biography ==
Siegfried Gutenbrunner was born in Vienna, Austria on 26 May 1906. He gained his PhD in Germanistics at the University of Vienna in 1931.

After gaining his habilitation at Vienna, Gutenbrunner served there as Privatdozent (1936–1939) and Docent (1939–1943). Since 1943, Gutenbrunner was associate professor of Germanic and Scandinavian studies at the Reichsuniversität Straßburg.

After the end of World War II, held a chair at the University of Kiel. Since 1950, Gutenbrunner served as associate professor (1950–1955) and professor (1955–1975) of Germanic and Nordic philology at the University of Freiburg. At Freiburg, Gutenbrunner founded the Seminar for Scandinavian Studies in 1963.

Gutenbrunner retired as professor emeritus in 1975, and died in Freiburg on 23 November 1984.

== See also ==
- Otto Höfler
- Richard Wolfram
- Walter Steinhauser

== Selected works ==
- Die Germanischen Götternamen der Antiken Inschriften, 1936
- Germanische Frühzeit in den Berichten der Antike, 1939
- Schleswig-Holsteins älteste Literatur, von der Kimbernzeit bis zur Gudrundichtung, 1949
- Historische Laut- und Formenlehre des Altisländischen, 1951
- Von Hildebrand und Hadubrand, 1976

== Sources ==
- Elias H. Füllenbach, Gutenbrunner, Siegfried, in: Internationales Germanistenlexikon 1800–1950. Band 1: A–G., hrsg. von Christoph König unter Mitarbeit von Birgit Wägenbaur de Gruyter, Berlin/New York 2003, ISBN 3-11-015485-4, S. 640–642.
