= Des kleinen Volkes Hochzeitsfest =

German folk legend

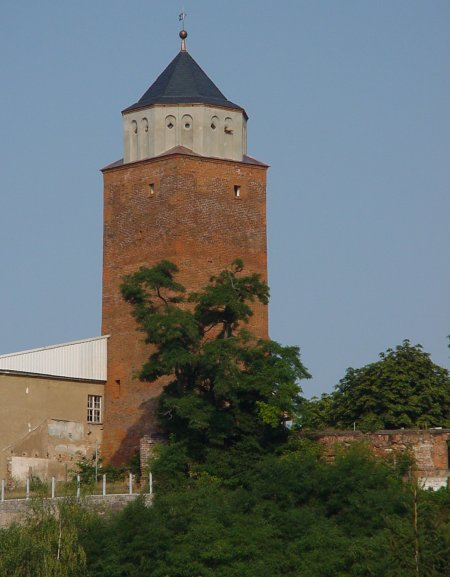
Tower of Eilenburg

Des kleinen Volkes Hochzeitsfest (Note: Spelling normalized from Des kleinen Volks Hochzeit-fest in the Grimms' original edition.) is a German legend set in Eilenburg Castle, where its count meets the little folk holding a wedding in his hall (his canopy bed).

A version of the legend from oral sources was published in the Brothers Grimm's Deutsche Sagen (1816), and translated into English as "The Wee People's Wedding" (or "The Wedding-Feast of the Little People").

== The Brothers Grimm legend ==
The wee folk of Eilenburg in Saxony were occasioned to propitiate a wedding and sneaked into the castle hall one night through the keyhole and window-cracks, scattering all over the floor.

They awoke the old count who now witnessed the wee folk, and one of them dressed like a herald approached and invited him to join the celebration, under the condition no one else may watch, not any of his servants, nor even a glance. A little woman was brought to him as dance partner, and the count could hardly keep up with her twirling around, as the torch-bearers (Note: Lampenträger, omitted in Bechstein's version.) lined up and the cricket music began.

Then the dance was suddenly interrupted and the music ceased, and many of the little folk scampered to hidden corners. As the bride and groom and dancers gazed up the hole in the ceiling the old countess was spying on them with curiosity (either a hole looking down from floor above, (Note: The Bechstein version annotates that the countess slept in the hall above.) or possibly through the canopy of the bed (Note: It is stated the count slept in a canopy bed ("im hohen Himmelbette"9; Keightley: "in his high or four-post bed), and it may have been only the bed used as the "hall" by the wee people.)). The herald then came and told the count the condition was breached by another human eye watching, so that regrettably, his Eilenburg family will be cursed with having no more than seven offspring. Then the wee ones disappeared away. The curse purportedly remained effective down the family line, and one of six Eilenburg knights remaining alive would always die before the seventh was born.

== Sources ==
The legend was included in the collection Deutsche Sagen by the Brothers Grimm (1816) and under the name "Der Graf von Eilenburg und die Zwerge" ("The Count of Eilenburg and the Dwarves") in the Deutsches Sagenbuch (1853) by Ludwig Bechstein.

Johann Wolfgang Goethe had written a ballad Hochzeitslied (Wedding Song, in collected works 1810), published before the Grimms, which commentators note must have drawn from a version of this legend; Goethe is quoted as saying he had been struck by the folklore about "der Graf und die Zwerge (the count and the dwarves) for many years before he finally set the idea in verse. This is too vague a hint to identify precisely which version he meant, but Düntzer describes one version set at Eilenburg Castle, but is rather different than the Grimms' rendition. Here, the count permits their use of his hall for a wedding, the dwarves bring good luck to the house, but the count is sworn to silence. After the count brings home a young beautiful new wife, the over-curiosity of the old countess ruins everything and the dwarves depart.

There is also a variant localized at Leuenburg, East Prussia (now Lębork, part of Poland) where the Leuenburg house was a branch of the Eulenburg family, with an altered spelling., and "Eulenburg" was also a former spelling of "Eilenburg". (Note: Bechstein makes reference to Tale No. 273 in his anthology, set in Eulenburg.)

== Heinzelmännchen ==
Düntzer's analysis explained that Goethe's influence was the legend about the beneficience of the wee spirits known variously as dwarves (Zwege), the Gütchen, wights (Wichtelchen) or Heinzelmännchen. Here he probably meant Heinzelmännchen generically, not necessarily with the Heinzelmännchen of Cologne.

The poet Bruno Lossa (pseudonym of Albrecht Giersch) in 1927 published "Des kleinen Volkes Hochzeitsfest" about the Heinzelmännchen of Eilenburg.

== City marketing ==
Since the 1050th anniversary of Eilenburg in 2011, the city has promoted the legend for city marketing, creating the city mascot "Heinz Elmann", whose name is a play on the word Heinzelmann. The market fountain featuring the Heinzelmännchen from the legend, built by Michael Weihe, replaced the fountain in front of the Eilenburg City Hall in 2000.

An art piece titled "Lauschberg" ("listening mountain") was installed at the Eilenburg Castle, where the old fountain used to be. The metal object is fitted with seven listening funnels, from which visitors can hear various sounds that the "Heinzelmännchen" would have made, or listen to the recorded recital of the legend published by the Grimms. There is also a hostel or guest house built nearby, called the "Heinzelberge" (a play on "Heinzelmännchen" and Hauberge for 'hostel').

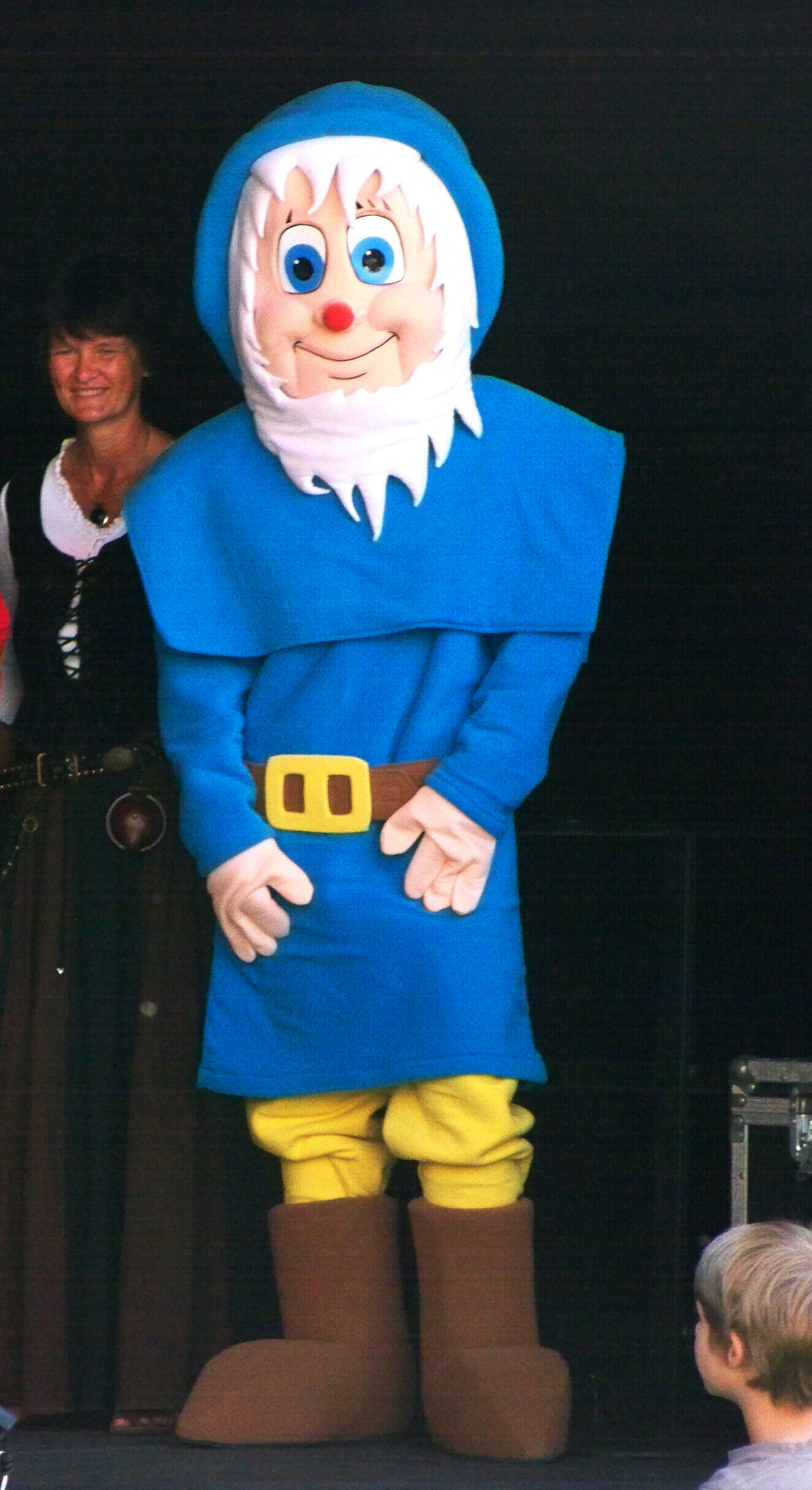
City mascot Heinz Elmann

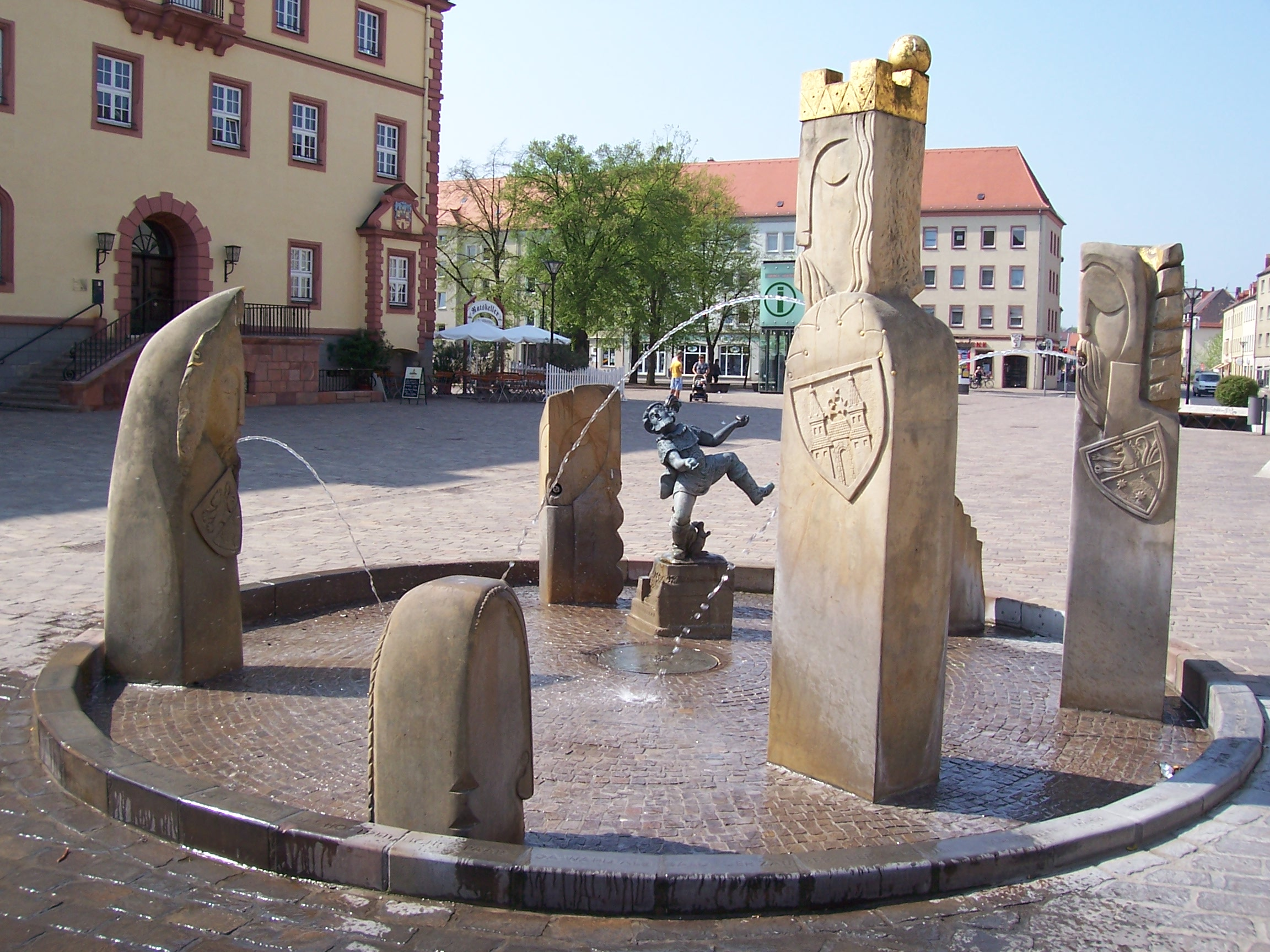
Market fountain of Eilenburg

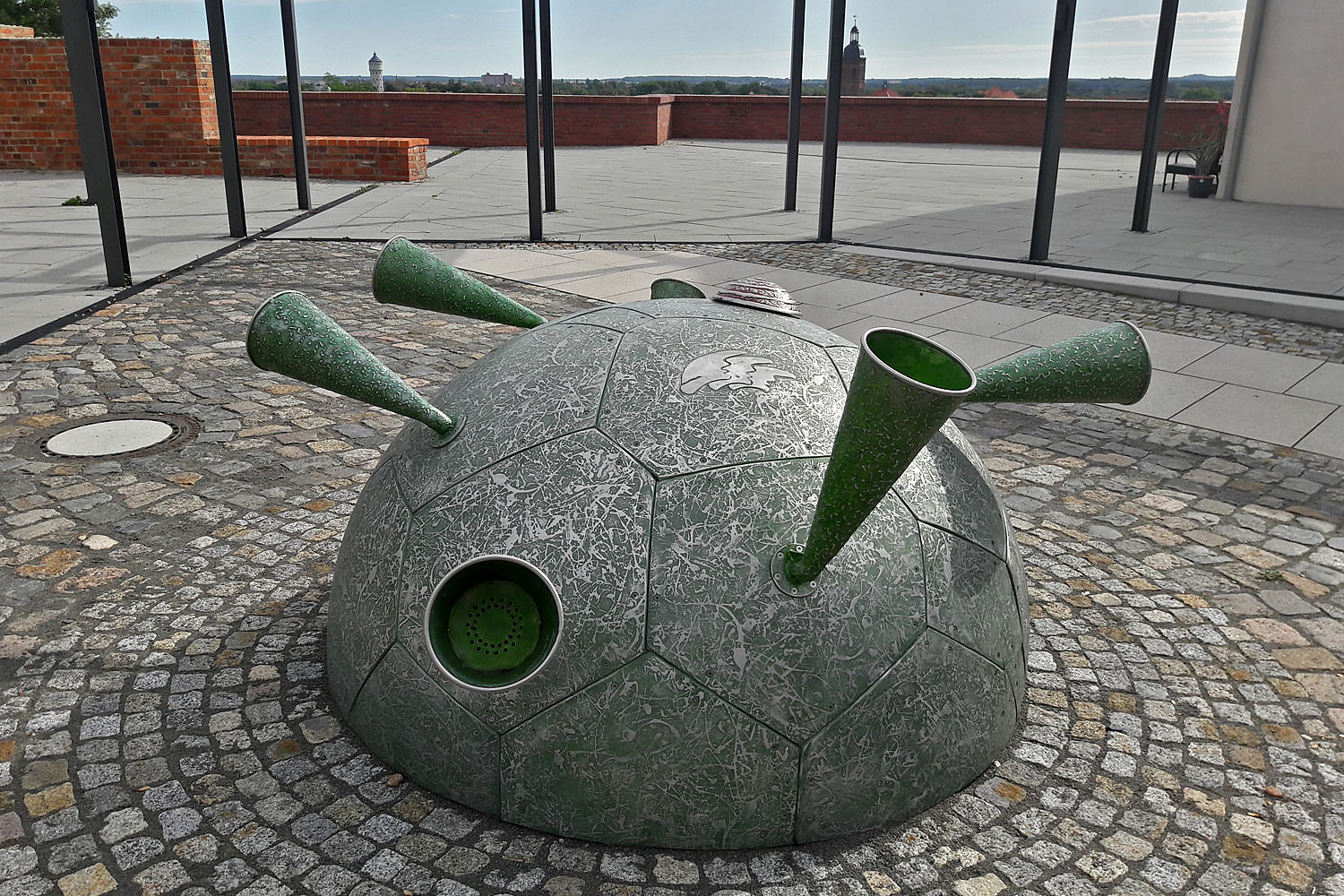
The Lauschberg ('listening mound') object

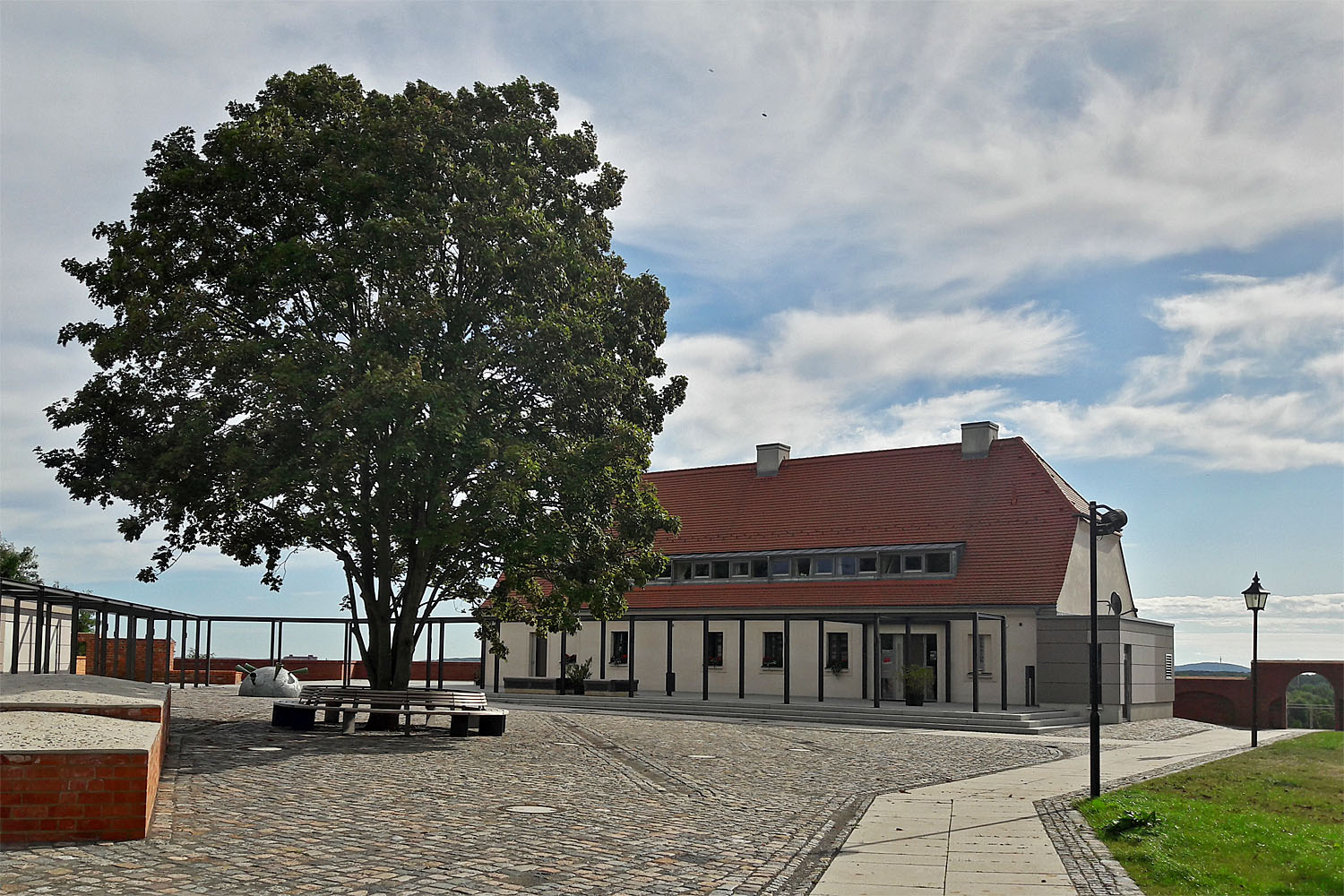
Pension Heinzelberge
