= Scarlett and Black =

British pop music duo

Scarlett And Black
- Origin: United Kingdom
- Genres: Pop
- Years active: 1986–1989
- Labels: Virgin
- Past members: Robin Hild; Sue West

Scarlett and Black were a pop duo from the UK, whose birth names were Robin Hild and Sue West. Robin Hild was previously the keyboard player for the Big Supreme; Sue West was a former backing vocalist for Doctor and the Medics. They released a self-titled album on Virgin Records in 1987, which proved to be a minor success in the U.S., peaking at No. 107 on the Billboard Top 200 in 1988. The single "You Don't Know" was a hit record that same year, peaking at No. 20 on the Billboard Hot 100 and appearing on the Adult Contemporary (No. 13) and Dance (No. 32 Hot Dance/Club Play, No. 41 Hot Dance Singles) charts.

Unable to provide a viable follow-up, Scarlett & Black remain dubbed as one-hit wonders.

== Discography ==
=== Albums ===
- Scarlett & Black (1987) - U.S. #107

=== Singles ===
- "You Don't Know" (1986)
- "You Never Understand Me" (1987)
- "You Don't Know (Remix)" (1987) - U.S. #20
- "Dream Out Loud" (1988)
- "Let Yourself Go-Go" (1988)
- "World Without You / Let Yourself Go-Go" (with Belinda Carlisle) (1988)

== In popular culture ==
"You Don't Know" is played in one of the Wyatt sisters' bedrooms in Parent Trap III (1989). It was also on the soundtrack for the movie Hiding Out (1987).
