= Toepen =

Dutch card game

- Dutch plain-trick game often played for drinks
- Origin: Netherlands
- Type: Simple trick-taker
- Players: 3–8
- Cards: 32
- Deck: Dutch pattern, French-suited
- Play: Clockwise

Related games
- Siebenschräm • Schröömen

Toepen (/ˈtupə(n)/) is a trick-taking Dutch card game for three to eight players, and is often played as a drinking game. Typically the number of players is 4.

== Rules ==
Toepen is usually played with money. Each player starts with ten 'lives'.

=== Deal and exchange ===
Each player is dealt 4 cards from a 32 card pack. The order of the cards is 10 (high), 9, 8, 7, A, K, Q, J. The remainder of the pack is put, face down, in the middle of the table. Any player whose hand consists entirely of As, Ks, Qs and Js may discard it, face down, and deal himself/herself a new one. Indeed, any player may discard their hand in this way. However any exchange may be challenged by an opponent. If a player making an exchange is found to have 10, 9, 8 or 7 in their original hand, the discarder loses one life (but keeps the new hand), while if it was correct, the challenger loses one life.

=== Play ===
The cards are played one at a time face up in tricks. The first card played in a trick determines the suit for that trick. A player must follow suit to win. The goal is to win the last trick.

At the end of the hand, all of the players, bar the winner of the fourth and final trick, receive a point. A player may toep i.e. increase the number of points at stake during a round at any time during play. Each toep increases the point value of the round by one. A toep is usually signified by a knock on the table. Upon toeping the opposing players may either fold and receive the previous point total or risk receiving the new increased total by remaining in the round. A player who reaches the maximum number of points is eliminated. This maximum is typically 10 or 15, depending on the price of drinks.

The winner of the round (i.e. the winner of the 4th trick) has to deal in the next round and the player on the left of the dealer leads to the first trick of the next round. The winner of a trick leads to the next trick in the same round. A special action occurs when a player is one point short of the maximum and is in pelt (poverty). In order to protect this player, the player on pelt always leads to the first trick, irrespective of where the dealer sits. The round value is automatically raised to 2 at the start and all other players have to decide whether they want to play the round for 2 points or leave (before a card is played) for 1 point.

A player who has lost ten lives, buys a round of drinks (or contributes to the drinks kitty or contributes an agreed number of chips to the pot), the slate is wiped clean and the next rubber starts. A player who has already lost nine lives may not knock. Similarly, a player who has already lost eight lives may not make the second knock, one who has already lost seven lives may not make the third knock, and so on.

=== Additional rules for the drinking game ===
Player to dealer's left leads first. Players must follow suit if possible, otherwise they may play any card. A trick is won by the highest card of the suit led, and the winner leads to the next trick. The winner of the fourth and last trick will deal the next hand. Each of the other players loses a life or lives. A player who holds three tens must whistle. A player who holds three jacks may whistle. A player who holds four tens must stand up. A player who holds four jacks may stand up. If a player is obliged to whistle but cannot, he must sing loudly.

=== Example ===
The score is kept using a chalk and slate. A normal game goes to a score of 10 or 15 points, chalked as marks on a slate (///). These are penalty points. the one who wins the last move does not get any points. The other players receive a number of penalty points. Here is an example.

Name: Points

Thijs: |||

Tame: ||||| ||||| ||||

Thomas: ||||| |||

Stan: ||||| |

You can toep, this means that more points are played. This example shows that Tame has often gone and often lost. Thijs has often won and has a low number of points. He has a great chance of winning. When he wins three times, he's a Toepkoning ("Tapping King"). Thomas plays average and Stan is probably a lijntoeper. This means that it only lasts when it is certain that it is winning. In this example, Tame insists on poverty. This means that when he gets another point, he's out of the game. Now the other players have to choose if they want to play. In the event that they last, two points are played.

== See also ==
- Bonken
