= Bonkers candy =

Brand of confectionery

Print ad for Bonkers seen in various DC Comics publications in 1986.

Bonkers was a candy offering from Nabisco in the mid-1980s. It consisted of chewable rectangular-shaped candies with tangy filling. The candy came in a large rectangular package with several of them individually wrapped. Common flavors included grape, orange, strawberry, watermelon and chocolate.

The product is perhaps most memorable for a series of television commercials in which one or more apparently uptight characters would take one bite of a Bonkers candy, and a giant fruit such as a bunch of grapes would fall from above and knock them into hysterical laughter. The tagline in the commercials was "Bonkers! Bonks you out!" Several of the commercials featured an older Southern woman who said in a deadpan voice that "Some folks think Bonkers is gum" after which the aforementioned giant fruit would fall on someone, inducing raucous laughter. The woman would then deadpan the line: "They know it's candy now." The original commercial had an ending that featured another giant piece of fruit falling, causing the actor to frown & a dour voice-over saying 'Artificially Flavored'. This was redone to have the actor continue to laugh when the last piece of fruit landed & the voice sounded more pleasant when it noted the artificial flavoring. Most of Bonkers candy commercials tended to be very high in energy, often with excited overtones.

After the commercials stopped running, the popularity of Bonkers waned until it became a rarity, available only in novelty candy stores. The manufacturer has discontinued the Bonkers line of candies. High competition in the candy and snack market combined with the increased focus on healthy alternatives may have also furthered the wane of Bonkers' popularity.

In February 2012, Leaf Brands, LLC, acquired the trademark and planned to reintroduce the classic brand into the market by the end of 2015. In November 2016, Bonkers Fruit Candy's Facebook and Twitter accounts stated, "We made more samples of Bonkers Fruit Chews on the line last week and we think they look pretty good! Getting closer but no date yet.." (With two pictures below, there have been no more updates on Bonkers Fruit Candy.)

The original flavors include:

- Peach
- Apple (Red outside, green inside)
- Lemon
- Lime
- Vanilla (Malagasy Vanilla outside, Vanilla cake inside)
- Lemon-Lime (Lemon outside, Lime inside)
- Vanilla-Peach (Malagasy Vanilla outside, Peach inside)
- Peach-Apricot (Peach outside, Apricot inside)
- Chocolate
- Watermelon
- Grape
- Orange
- Strawberry
