= Manfred H. Grieb =

German entrepreneur and art collector

Manfred H. Grieb (6 February 1933 – 20 February 2012) what a German entrepreneur and art collector as well as the editor of the Nürnberger Künstlerlexikon.

== Life ==
Born in Würzburg, Grieb completed a commercial apprenticeship from 1947 to 1950 and learned foreign languages at language institutes and as a guest student at the University of Würzburg. From 1951 to 1969 he worked as an employed merchant in Germany and South America. In 1969 he started self-employment with a small chain of shops and a printing shop for greeting cards, gift articles, stationery and others (company "karten-vitrine").

After the sale of his company in 1992, he worked as an art collector (Nuremberg city views) and gallery owner. ("Fränkische Bilder-Galerie Grieb & Popp OHG") and worked on the four-volume Nürnberger Künstlerlexikon with over 20,000 entries, which quickly became a standard work on the history of the city of Nuremberg after its publication in 2007. The work is also criticized for its omissions among artists with a National Socialist past.

In 1996 Grieb became a member of the Pegnesischer Blumenorden. From 2000 to 2008 he was its vice-president, and in 2007 he was awarded the Cross of Honour of the Blumenorden for this. In 2009 he founded a support association for the establishment of a cultural history museum in Nuremberg. Grieb died in Nuremberg at age 79. He was buried at the Johannisfriedhof in Nürnberg.

== Publications ==
- (Editor): Nürnberger Künstlerlexikon. Bildende Künstler, Kunsthandwerker, Gelehrte, Sammler, Kulturschaffende und Mäzene vom 12. bis zur Mitte des 20. Jahrhunderts. 4 volumes, Saur, Munich 2007, ISBN 978-3-598-11763-3.
