= The Big Supreme =

- Origin: United Kingdom
- Genres: Pop
- Labels: Polydor

The Big Supreme were a 1980s band from England, featuring vocalist Barry Flynn.

== Biography ==
Barry Flynn was in the early 1980s new wave band Bonk, who had a UK number 96 chart single "The Smile and the Kiss" in 1983 (this was the first commercially released recording to feature Toni Halliday from 1990s indie band Curve). After Bonk's top 100 debut was re-issued under a more radio-friendly band name, The Chant of Barry Flynn, a new band featuring Flynn, the Big Supreme, signed to PolyGram's Polydor Records label.

The Big Supreme scored two hit singles on the UK Singles Chart in 1986–7. The first, "Don't Walk", entered the chart on 13 September 1986. It remained in the chart for four weeks, reaching number 58. In the U.S., "Don't Walk" became a classic at the Dallas, Texas nightclub The Starck and also regularly played as the last song of the night by DJ Joe Friar at Club Control in Victoria, Texas. In Houston, the track was frequently played on KKBQ-FM and KRBE. Clubs such as The Ocean Club (Galleria) and Club 6400 (Richmond ave.) also included the track as part of their mix playlists.

The Big Supreme's second chart single, "Please Yourself" entered the chart in February 1987, reached a peak of number 64, and was in the chart for five weeks. Barry Flynn would release a solo single in 1989 as Flynn called "The Only One", whilst keyboard player Robin Hild had brief success in America as part of the duo Scarlett and Black.
