= Touch and Go =

Touch and Go and similar may refer to:

== Transport ==
- Touch-and-go landing, an aviation term referring to an aircraft maneuver
- TaG (kart) (Touch and Go), a class in kart racing
- Touch 'n Go, a highway toll collection system in Malaysia
- Touch 'n Go eWallet, a mobile app based e-wallet and payment system
- "Touch and go" payment, also known as contactless payment

== Literature ==
- Touch and Go, a 2007 memoir by Studs Terkel
- Touch and Go (play), a play by D. H. Lawrence
- Touch and Go (book), a book containing all issues of the Touch and Go punk zine
- Touch and Go (novel), a novel by C. Northcote Parkinson

=== Comics ===
- Touch-N-Go (comics), DC Comics character
- "Touch and Go", an episode of the 2003 TV series Teenage Mutant Ninja Turtles, or the title characters, Mr. Touch and Mr. Go

== Film ==
- Touch & Go (2002 film), a Canadian comedy directed by Scott Simpson
- Touch and Go (1955 film), a British comedy by Michael Truman
- Touch and Go (1980 film), an Australian heist film starring Wendy Hughes
- Touch and Go (1986 film), a comedic drama starring Michael Keaton
- Touch and Go (1991 film) (also known as Point of No Return), a Hong Kong film starring Sammo Hung
- Touch and Go (1998 film), a UK television film featuring Ewan Stewart

== Games ==
- Yoshi Touch & Go, a 2005 video game in the Yoshi series

== Music ==
- Touch and Go (band), a UK jazz-pop ensemble
- Touch and Go (album), a 1987 album by Force M.D.'s
- Touch and Go Records, an American independent record label
- Touch and Go (musical), a Broadway musical with choreography by Helen Tamiris

=== Songs ===
- "Touch and Go" (Jerry Fuller song), popularized by Al Wilson in 1974
- "Touch and Go" (Magazine song), 1978
- "Touch and Go" (The Cars song), 1980
- "Touch and Go" (Ed Sheeran song), 2014
- "Touch & Go" (Tinashe and 6lack song), 2019
- "Touch and Go", a song by Ecstasy, Passion & Pain
- "Touch and Go", a song by Emerson, Lake & Powell from Emerson, Lake & Powell
- "Touch & Go", a song by Joe Budden from Halfway House
- "Touch and Go", a song by John Foxx from Metamatic
- "Touch and Go", a song by Swingfly from God Bless the IRS
