= Porky =

Porky may refer to:

== As a nickname ==
- Frank Biscan (1920–1959), Major League Baseball pitcher
- Gordon Brown (Canadian football) (born 1927), Canadian Football League retired player
- Porky Chedwick, Pittsburgh radio disk jockey of the 1950s and 1960s
- Edward Cragg (pilot) (1919–1943), American World War II fighter ace
- Dan Flynn (boxer) (1888–1946), American boxer
- Porky Freeman (1916–2001), American Western swing performer, bandleader, and songwriter
- Rafael López Aliaga, Peruvian politician
- Paul Morgan (rugby league, died 2001) (died 2001), Australian rugby league player and businessman
- Ed Oliver (golfer) (1916–1961), American golfer
- George Peckham, British record engineer
- Hal Reniff (1938–2004), Major League Baseball pitcher
- Alex Romeril (1882–1968), Canadian hockey and football player, and first coach of the Toronto Maple Leafs
- John Zancocchio (born 1958), New York mobster

== Fictional characters ==
- Porky Pig, a character from the Looney Tunes and Merrie Melodies series
- Porky, a character in Our Gang
- Porky, the title character of Porky's, a 1982 Canadian film
- Silvester "Porky" Broadway, a character from Lassie
- Porky Pine, a character in the Pogo comic strip by Walt Kelly
- Porky Minch, a character from the Mother video game series

== Other uses ==
- Porky (novel), a 1983 novel by Deborah Moggach
- Porky (Stephanolepis auratus), a species of fish - see Stephanolepis
- Porky the Poet was a stage name used by the comedian Phill Jupitus early in his career

== See also ==
- "Porkies", the Porcupine Mountains of Michigan
- Porky's, a 1981 sex comedy film
