= Naff =

Naff or NAFF may refer to:

People:

- William E. Naff, an American scholar of Japanese language
- Lycia Naff, actress
- D-Naff (born 1974), a Namibian award-winning Gospel rapper, and a former street gangster
- Petty Naff, a notorious rowdy of the Know-Nothing Riot of 1856
- Kevin Naff, editor at the Washington Blade

Acronym:

- National Association for Freedom
- Nederlandse American Football Federatie (see American football in the Netherlands)

Other:

- Naff (Polari), UK slang meaning 'inferior, tacky'
- Naff, Indonesian alternative rock band

== See also ==
- Naf River
