= Robert Menzies (water polo) =

Australian water polo player

Personal information
- Nationality: Australian
- Born: 3 April 1946 (age 78)

Sport
- Sport: Water polo

Robert Menzies (born 3 April 1946) is an Australian water polo player. He competed in the men's tournament at the 1972 Summer Olympics.
