= Minge (surname) =

Minge is a surname. Notable people with the surname include:

- David Minge (born 1942), American politician
- Ewa Minge (born 1967), Polish fashion designer
- Ralf Minge (born 1960), German football player and coach
- Janina Minge (born 1999), German football player
- Siri Minge (born 1994), Norwegian cyclist

== See also ==
- Minges
