= Friedrich Neumann =

German philologist (1889–1978)

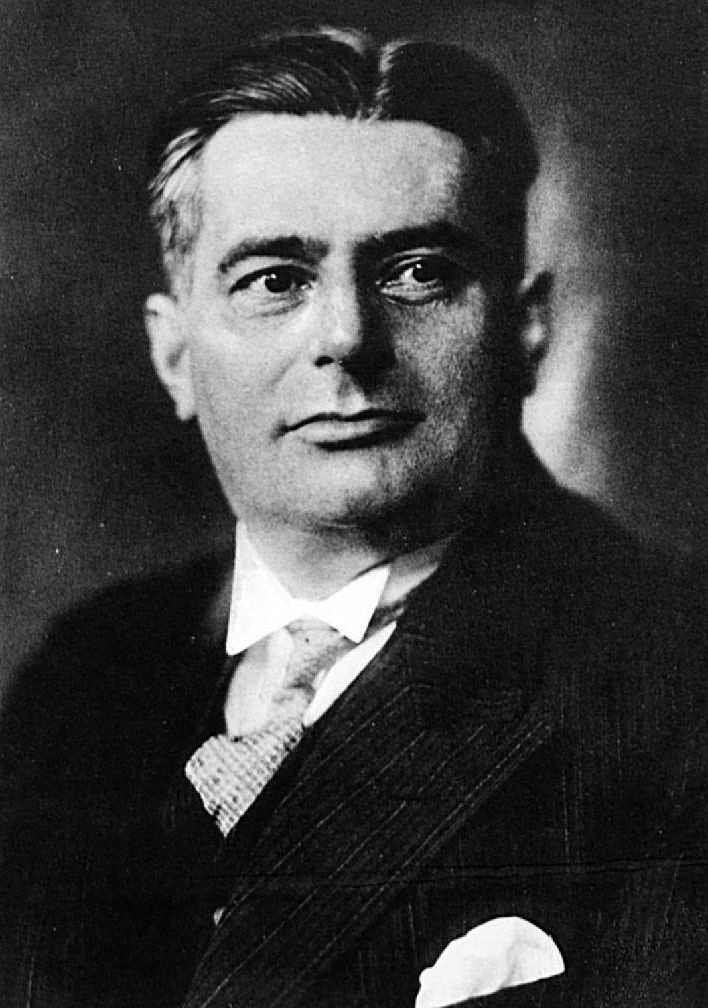
- Born: 2 March 1889; Kassel, Germany
- Died: 12 December 1978 (aged 89); Göttingen, Germany

Academic background
- Education: University of Göttingen

Academic work
- Discipline: Germanic philology
- Sub-discipline: German philology
- Institutions: Leipzig University; University of Göttingen
- Notable students: Hans Butzmann; Karl Brethauer
- Main interests: German literature

Friedrich Neumann (2 March 1889 – 12 December 1978) was a German philologist who specialized in Germanic studies.

== Biography ==
Friedrich Neumann was born Kassel, Germany on 2 March 1889. From 1907 to 1913, Neumann studied classical philology, German literature and philosophy at Marburg University, the Ludwig-Maximilians-Universität München, and the University of Göttingen. He received his Ph.D. at the University of Göttingen in 1914.

Neumann volunteered for service in the German Army during World War I, and served on the Western Front. Neumann completed his habilitation in philology at Göttingen in 1921. He subsequently served as a professor at the University of Leipzig.

Since 1927, Neumann was Professor of German Philology at the University of Göttingen. Among his students were Hans Butzmann, Karl Brethauer and Gottfried Höfer. At the University of Göttingen, Neumann served as Rector from 1933 to 1938, and Vice Rector from 1938 to 1945. He was a member of the Göttingen Academy of Sciences and Humanities from 1943 to 1945.

A member of the Nazi Party, Neumann was fired from the University of Göttingen and expelled from the Göttingen Academy of Sciences and Humanities in 1945. He was subsequently rehabilitated, and retired from the university with a pension in 1954. Neumann was awarded the Brothers Grimm Prize of the University of Marburg in 1971. He died in Göttingen on 12 December 1978.

== See also ==
- Wolfgang Krause

== Sources ==
- Ulrich Hunger (1999). "Neumann, Friedrich". Neue Deutsche Biographie (in German). Vol. 19. Berlin: Duncker & Humblot. pp. 148–149. (full text online).
