= Boink =

American erotica magazine

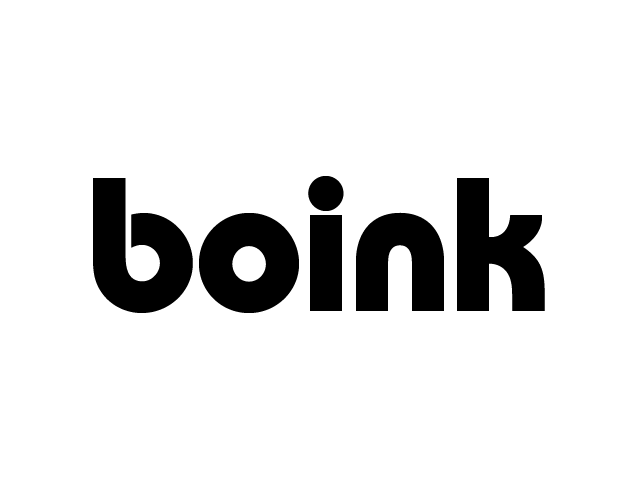
Boink logo

Boink was a magazine of erotica started by Alecia Oleyourryk, a magazine journalism student at Boston University, and the photographer Christopher Anderson. The magazine was also educational in scope and purpose. The first issue was released in February 2005 and was celebrated with an opening party at the Roxy, a nightclub in the Boston Theater District.

== Background ==
The magazine was available in both a print and online digital versions. Boink catered to both men and women with articles dealing with sexuality in college life. All models were students from area colleges and of various sexual orientations.

In 2008, a book based on the magazine was published by Warner Books, titled Boink: College Sex by the People Having It.

By 2010, the magazine had ceased publishing new issues, although the book can still be purchased online.

"The reason that I like this magazine is that you can tell they are real college students... not those fake college students you find on the Internet." —Howard Stern (BU alumnus)
