= Bonken =

Dutch card game

Bonken is a Dutch trick-taking card game for 4 players that is played with a standard pack of cards. Everyone plays for themselves. It is a compendium game of 11 rounds, each of which has its own goal. The aim of the game is to score as few penalty points as possible. The player who scores the fewest points is declared the winner.

== Object ==
Bonken is fundamentally a trick-taking game with the exception of the Domino contract. A trick is taken by the player who played the highest card of the led suit or, if applicable, the one who played the highest trump. The card rankings are as usual, the Ace being high and 2 low. Players are obliged to follow suit if able to do so. If there are trumps, a player is allowed (not required) to play a trump if he cannot follow suit.

== Deal ==
One of the players starts as dealer and shuffles the deck. After this, he deals every player 13 cards. The cards are dealt clockwise. The player who sits across the table from the dealer can choose which of the rounds is played. He is not allowed to choose a round that has already been played. The player to the right of the dealer starts doubling. After the descriptions of the rounds is the explanation of doubling. The player on the left of the dealer plays the leading card. After the first trick the player who took that trick plays the next leading card. After each round the cards are shuffled and dealt by the player to the left of the previous dealer. As noted before, each of the rounds has its own goal.

== Rounds ==
The game is played over eleven rounds, the final four being the same:

1. Ducking (Bukken): the goal is to take the fewest tricks possible. There are no trumps. Each trick taken by a player scores -5 points.
2. No Hearts (Hartenjagen): the aim is to avoid capturing hearts in any tricks taken. There are no trumps. A player may not lead with hearts unless he cannot do otherwise. Every heart taken scores -5 points.
3. No Men (Herenboeren): the goal is to avoid capturing Kings and Jacks in any tricks taken. There are no trumps. Each King captured scores -20 points and each Jack scores -10 points.
4. No Queens (Vrouwen): the goal is to avoid capturing Queens in any tricks. There are no trumps. Each Queen captured scores -30 points.
5. No King of Hearts (Hartenheer): there are no trumps. Players may not lead with hearts unless they cannot do otherwise. The player who captures the King of Hearts scores -50 points.
6. No Last (Laatste slag): there are no trumps. The player who takes the last trick scores -50 points.
7. Domino (Domino): cards are laid to the table. When on lead, a player must lay either and Eight or a card one rank higher or lower than a table card (e.g. a 6 of diamonds may be laid off against a 7 of diamonds, but not the 7 of spades or 8 of diamonds). Players may only pass if unable to do either. The player who is last out scores -50 points.
8. Trumps (Troeven): every player is allowed to choose trumps for the round once. The player may choose what a trump suit is or to play with no trumps. A player may not choose a suit that has already been chosen. Each trick won scores 10 points. Note that only 4 out of 5 options are played.
9. Trumps: as round 8
10. Trumps: as round 8
11. Trumps: as round 8

== Doubling ==
Before the chosen round is played all players have the opportunity to double. The player to the right of the dealer may begin doubling. If a player doubles another, the difference in point obtained in that round will be added to his point total and subtracted from the other players total. If a player doubles a player and that player doubles back, the difference is accounted twice.

The person who chose the round can only double back, that is, he cannot double players who haven't doubled him.

If the points are divided correctly, the sum of the final scores of all four player will be 0, even if players have doubled during the game.

== See also ==
- Toepen
