= Ernst Weyden =

German scholar

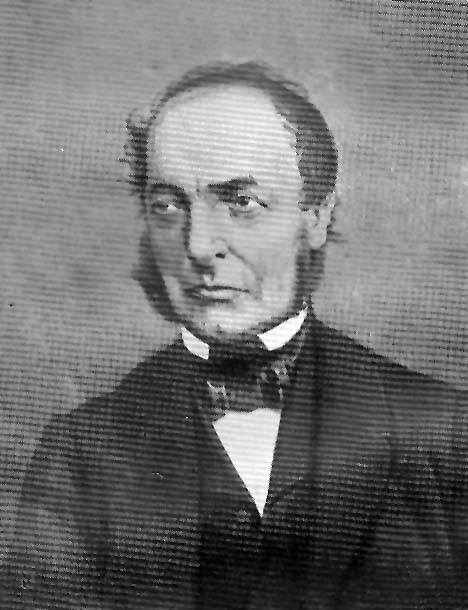
- Ernst Weyden
- Born: 18 May 1805
- Died: 11 October 1869 (aged 64)
- Occupation: Scholar

Ernst Weyden (18 May 1805 – 11 October 1869) was a scholar and member of the Faculty at the University of Cologne.

== Publications ==
All publications in German, unless otherwise noted.

- Cöln's Vorzeit: Geschichten, Legenden und Sagen Cöln's nebst einer Auswahl cölnischer Volkslieder. Cöln a. Rh: Schmitz, 1826.
- (in French) Aventures merveilleuses de Siegfried Sagas. Paris: L. Janet, 1833.
- (in French) Fréderic et Gela. Sagas. Paris: L. Janet, 1833.
- (in French) Drachenfels et Rolandsech. Sagas. Paris: L. Janet, 1833.
- (in French) Loreley Sagas. Paris: L. Janet, 1833.
- (in French) La dame Richmodis. Sagas. Paris: L. Janet, 1833.
- (in French) Germain Joseph. Sagas. P. 43-47: [1] f. de pl, 1833.
- (in French) Albertus Magnus. Sagas. Paris: L. Janet, 1833.
- Geschichte der Burgen, Rittergüter, Abteien und Klöster in den Rheinlanden und den Provinzen Jülich, Cleve, Berg und Westphalen, nach archivarischen und andern authentischen Quellen gesammelt und bearbeitet von F. E. von Mering und Ernst Weyden. II. Heft, mit der Abbildung der Schlossruine zu Andernach. Köln: H. A. Arend, 1834.
- Das Ahrthal ein Führer von der Mündung der Ahr bis zu ihrer Quellen; historisch topographische Skizzen und naturhistorische Andeutungen; mit 6 Stahlstichen. Bonn: Habicht, 1835.
- Feierstunden. Köln: Renard und Dübyen, 1835.
- Kurzer Umriß der Geschichte der schönen Literatur Italiens. 1837.
- Godesberg, das Siebengebirge und ihre Umgebungen. Für den Fremden und Heimischen historisch-romantisch geschildert mit naturhistorischen Andeutungen. Bonn: T. Habicht, 1837. New edition 1838,
- Godesberg, das Siebengebirge und ihre Umgebungen. 1838.
- Kölns Legenden, Sagen, Geschichten, nebst Volksliedern, Schwänken, Anekdoten, Sprichwörtern. Köln: Tonger, 1839.
- Das Ahrthal: ein Führer von der Mündung der Ahr bis zu ihren Quellen; nebst einem Abstecher nach dem Laacher-See und dem Brohlthale, historisch-topographische Skizzen und naturhistorische Andeutungen. Bonn: Habicht, 1839. Second edition, 1839
- Das haus Overstolz zur Rheingasse genannt Tempelhaus: Historische Skizze und Beschreibung seiner innere Ausschmückung.' Köln: M. Du Mont-Schauberg, 1842.
- Die Erfindung des Schießpulvers und der Feuerwaffen, ihre Einführung und Verbreitung in den Hauptstaaten Europas. [Schulprogramme Köln, 1844]. Köln: Schlösser, 1844.
- Die neuen Dom-Fenster, ein Weihe-Geschenk des Königs Ludwig I. von Bayern: zum Besten der Dombau-Gasse. Köln: Eilen, 1848.
- (in French) Études étymologiques. Köln: J. P. Bachem, 1853.
- Die neuen Glasgemälde im Dome zu Köln: ein Weihe-Geschenk Sr. Maj. des Königs Ludwig I. von Bayern. Köln: Franz Carl Eisen, 1854. Third edition, 1854.
- Sängerfahrt des Kölner Männer-Gesang-Vereins nach London. Köln: F.C. Eisen, dc 1854, 1854.
- Rückblicke auf Köln's Kunstgeschichte. 1855.
- Köln am Rhein vor fünfzig Jahren Sitten-Bilder nebst historischen Andeutungen und sprachlichen Erläuterungen. Köln: DuMont-Schauberg, 1862.
- Die Schlacht bei Worringen am 5. Juni 1288. Koln: F.P. Bachem, 1864.
- Godesberg, das Siebengebirge, und ihre Umgebungen: Für den Fremden und Heimischen geschildert, mit naturhistorischen Andeutungen. Mit 1 Stahlstich und 1 Karte. Bonn: T. Habicht, 1864.
- Das Siegthal: ein Führer von der Mündung bis zur Quelle des Flusses und durch seine Seitenthäler. Zugleich Handbuch für Reisende auf der Deutz-Siegener Eisenbahn. Topographisch-historische Skizzen nebst statistischen und naturgeschichtlichen Andeutungen. Mit 1 Stahlstich und 1 Karte. Bonn: T. Habicht, 1865. Lesimple's Reisebücher, 2. Leipzig: Lesimple, 1865.
- Das Siegthal. Ein Führer von der Mündung bis zur Quelle des Flusses und durch seine Seitenthäler ... Mit 1 Stahlstich und 1 Karte. 1866.
- Geschichte der Juden in Köln am Rhein von den Römerzeiten bis auf die Gegenwart; nebst Noten und Urkunden. Köln: M. DuMont-Schauberg, 1867.
