= Menzies (disambiguation) =

Menzies is a Scottish surname.

Menzies may also refer to:

== Places ==
=== Australia ===
- Division of Menzies, an electoral division, Melbourne, Australia
- Hundred of Menzies, a cadastral unit on Kangaroo Island in South Australia
- Menzies, Queensland, a suburb in the City of Mount Isa
- Menzies, Western Australia, a town
- Shire of Menzies, Western Australia

=== Elsewhere ===
- Menzies Bay (British Columbia), Canada
- Mount Menzies, Antarctica

== People ==
- Clan Menzies, a Scottish clan
- Menzies Campbell (1941–2025), British politician, advocate and athlete
- Menzies Dickson (c. 1840–1891), American photographer in Hawaii

== Businesses ==
- Menzies Art Brands, an Australian art auction company
- Menzies Aviation, an Edinburgh-based business

== Schools and research institutions ==
- Menzies College, La Trobe University, Bundoora, Victoria, Australia
- Menzies College, New Zealand, a secondary school in Wyndham
- Menzies Institute for Medical Research, University of Tasmania, Hobart, Tasmania, Australia

== Other uses ==
- Menzies Research Centre, an Australian public policy think tank
- Menzies baronets, an extinct title in the Baronetage of Nova Scotia
