= ZOBODAT =

Austrian taxonomic database of species, bibliographic, and author data

ZOBODAT is an online catalogue of taxonomic, bibliographic, author and specimen data, from mainly German language sources. The database is published by Oberösterreichische Landesmuseen and was founded in 1972 by Ernst Reichl. At August 16, 2022, it contained 3,476,485 occurrence records, 1,089 journal records (together with their contents), 25,379 authors (including their publications, and specimens collected and determined), and information on 62,977 species.

The reader may access the information in German, French, English, Spanish, Portuguese or Hungarian.
