= Walter Steinhauser =

Austrian philologist

- Walter Steinhauser in 1970
- Born: 7 February 1885; Vienna, Austria-Hungary
- Died: 3 August 1980 (aged 95); Vienna, Austria

Academic background
- Education: University of Vienna
- Academic advisor: Rudolf Much

Academic work
- Discipline: Philology
- Sub-discipline: Germanic philology
- Institutions: University of Vienna
- Main interests: Early Germanic culture

Walter Steinhauser (1885–1980) was an Austrian philologist who specialized in Germanic studies.

== Biography ==
Walter Steinhauser was born in Vienna on 7 February 1885. His father was a landowner and lawyer. After graduating from the Schottengymnasium, Steinhauser served a year in the Austro-Hungarian Army. Since 1905, Steinhauer studied Germanistics at the University of Vienna under Joseph Seemüller and Rudolf Much, and Indo-European linguistics under Paul Kretschmer, in addition to philosophy. He served as an officer of the Austro-Hungarian Army in 1906, and received a PhD in 1911 under the supervision of Seemüller.

From 1912 to 1935, Steinhauser worked at the Austrian Academy of Sciences. He served as an officer in the Austro-Hungarian Army during World War I, retiring at the rank of captain. He completed his habilitation in Germanic studies in 1927 under the supervision of Much at the University of Vienna, where he subsequently became a lecturer. In 1935, Steinhauser succeeded Much as Chair of Germanic Linguistics, Germanic Studies and Scandinavian Studies at the University of Vienna. He became a Member of the Austrian Academy of Sciences in 1940. During the Vienna Offensive in April 1945, Steinhauser served in the Volksturm.

A member of the Nazi Party, Steinhauser was fired from the University of Vienna after World War II and forbidden from entering the university premises. He continued with independent research, and died in Vienna on 3 August 1980.

== See also ==
- Otto Höfler

== Sources ==
- Rudolf Vierhaus (ed.): Deutsche Biographische Enzyklopädie 2., überarbeitete und erweiterte Auflage. Vol. 9, Walter de Gruyter, Berlin 2008, p. 659
- Christoph König: Steinhauser, Walter. In: Derselbe (ed.): Internationales Germanistenlexikon 1800–1950. Vol. 3: R–Z. de Gruyter, Berlin/New York 2003, ISBN 3-11-015485-4, pp. 1804–1805.
