= Richard Wolfram =

Austrian philologist

- Photograph of Richard Wolfram in 1970
- Born: 16 September 1901; Vienna, Austria-Hungary
- Died: 30 May 1995 (aged 93); Traismauer, Austria
- Awards: Knight 1st Class of the Order of Vasa (1930); Commander of the Order of the Polar Star (1970)

Academic background
- Education: University of Vienna
- Academic advisor: Rudolf Much

Academic work
- Discipline: Philology
- Sub-discipline: Germanic philology
- Institutions: University of Vienna
- Main interests: Early Germanic culture

Richard Wolfram (16 September 1901 – 30 May 1995) was an Austrian philologist who specialized in Germanic studies.

== Biography ==
Richard Wolfram was born in Vienna, Austria-Hungary on 16 September 1901. His family was well educated and middle class. Since 1920, Wolfram studied Germanistics, Scandinavistics and art history at the University of Vienna. He gained his PhD at the University of Vienna in 1926 with a thesis on Ernst Moritz Arndt. Wolfram completed his habilitation in Germanic studies at the University of Vienna in 1934 under the supervision of Rudolf Much. His thesis was on the comitatus in early Germanic society.

Wolfram lectured at the University of Vienna since 1928, where he in 1939 was appointed an associate professor of Germanic studies. A member of the Nazi Party and the Ahnenerbe, Wolfram was dismissed from the University of Vienna after World War II. He subsequently worked as a freelance scholar, but resumed lecturing at the University of Vienna in 1954, here he was reappointed an associate professor in 1959, and a full professor in 1963.

Wolfram retired in 1972, after which he was elected a Member of the Austrian Academy of Sciences. Wolfram was the recipient of a large number of prestigious awards, including the Knight 1st Class of the Order of Vasa (1930), Commander of the Order of the Polar Star (1970), and the Austrian Decoration for Science and Art, 1st Class (1977). He died in Traismauer, Austria on 30 May 1995.

== See also ==
- Otto Höfler
- Jan de Vries
- Herbert Jankuhn
- Kurt Ranke
- Franz Rolf Schröder
- Hermann Güntert

== Selected works ==
- Schwerttanz und Männerbund, 1936-1937
- Die Volkstänze in Österreich und verwandte Tänze in Europa, 1972
- Brauchtum und Volksglaube in der Gottschee, 1980
- Südtiroler Volksschauspiel und Spielbräuche, 1987

== Sources ==
- U. Kammerhofer-Aggermann: „In memoriam Richard Wolfram (1901-1995)“, in: Mitteilungen der Anthropologischen Gesellschaft in Wien, Vol 125/126, Wien 1995/96, pp. 317–318
- K. Köstlin: „Richard Wolfram 1901-1995“. In: Zeitschrift für Volkskunde. No. 4. Wien 1995. pp. 480–483.
