= Alraune (disambiguation) =

Alraune is a fictional female character in a novel of the same name by German writer Hanns Heinz Ewers.

Alraune may also refer to:

== Films ==
- Alraune (1918 film), a Hungarian adaptation of the novel co-directed by Michael Curtiz
- Alraune (1928 film), a German adaptation of the novel starring Brigitte Helm
- Alraune (1930 film), a German science fiction horror film
- Alraune (1952 film), a West German production

== Other ==
- Alraune, the German term for a Mandrake root
- Alraune, an alternate German name for the mythical Kobold
- Alraune, the 1996 debut album of Thrones
