= Alraune (1952 film) =

1952 West German horror sci-fi film

- German poster for Alraune
- Directed by: Arthur Maria Rabenalt
- Screenplay by: Kurt Heuser
- Based on: The novel, Alraune, by Hanns Heinz Ewers
- Produced by: Günther Stapenhorst, Carlton-Film, Deutsche Syria Film GmbH
- Starring: Hildegard Knef; Erich von Stroheim; Karlheinz Böhm
- Cinematography: Friedl Behn-Grund
- Edited by: Doris Zeltmann
- Music by: Werner Richard Heymann
- Production companies: Deutsche Styria-Film GmbH; Carlton Film GmbH
- Distributed by: Gloria-Filmverleih GmbH
- Release date: 23 October 1952 (Germany)
- Running time: 92 minutes
- Country: West Germany
- Language: German

Alraune, later renamed Unnatural: The Fruit of Evil, is a 1952 West German horror science fiction film, directed by Arthur Maria Rabenalt and starring Hildegard Knef and Erich von Stroheim. The film is based on the 1911 novel Alraune by German novelist Hanns Heinz Ewers. The plot involves a scientist (von Stroheim) who creates a woman (Knef) who is beautiful yet soulless, lacking any sense of morality.

== Plot ==
Professor Jacob ten Brinken (Erich von Stroheim) loses his university teaching role due to his abnormal interest in studying artificial insemination. He was able to artificially impregnate a female prostitute with the sperm of a male murderer condemned to death by hanging. He raises the child, named Alraune (Hildegard Knef), the German word for mandrake root, which has a variety of connotations in German folklore for its seemingly human-shaped appearance as well as its hallucinogenic effects.

Medical student Frank Braun (Karlheinz Böhm) arrives at his uncle's estate, Jacob ten Brinken, to ask for a loan. Braun becomes interested in Alraune, who is now a beautiful young woman. They quickly profess their love and desire to be together. Alraune announces she is leaving her father Jacob ten Brinken to live with Frank Braun in Paris. When Ten Brinken informs Frank about Alraune's ability to "lure men to their demise", Frank is horrified and leaves for Paris without Alraune. Devastated and betrayed, she begins to show more signs of lacking any soul or morality. She suggests to ten Brinken to buy acres of land, but upon arriving they learn that the property includes a potentially valuable sulfur spring.

Alraune then begins using her sexual appeal to flirt with men that have fallen for her. She goes horseback riding with Gerald during a rainstorm, carriage riding with Mathieu, ten Brinken's coachman, and poses for Ralph to paint her. When one of Alraune's necklaces winds up missing, she accuses her teacher, Mademoiselle Duvaliere (Denise Vernac), who is then fired for theft. It later turns out that Doctor Mohn (Harry Halm) stole the necklace from Alraune's jewelry box and framed Duvaliere, all to gain attention from Alraune.

Months later, Frank returns from Paris, having completed his studies. Alraune still proclaims her love for him, though Frank resents her. Alraune, now distraught by this begins unleashing her "true nature of evil". Mathieu's carriage falls over a cliff, Ralph gets sick and dies from pneumonia while Gerald is killed by Dr. Mohn. With no man seemingly able to make her happy, Alraune questions her own morality and feelings for Frank. She begs Frank for help, even going as far as to cry real tears. Frank, taken aback by this, realizes that everything he was told about this "unnatural being" is false. Seeing that she can evoke emotions and is not as "soulless" as he was led to believe, he takes her back and they plan to elope. Alraune tells ten Brinken about their plans, but he refuses to let her go, his reasoning being that she will destroy him and herself, just as she did with the other men.

Days later, the sulfur spring has run dry and Dr. Mohn is threatening to expose ten Brinken for his illegal experiments. He plans to run away with Alraune to Germany with the money left over from the land purchase. Alraune is convinced that she is nothing but "the bringer of destruction" as she is the direct result of a cruel experiment concocted by her ungodly father, heightened by the evil thoughts of her biological parents. Frank convinces her that both good and evil are always present in each individual, regardless of circumstances, and that the good in her can prevail over the evil.

Frank carries Alraune back to the estate; when they arrive, ten Brinken is convinced that she will leave him for Frank. He then pulls out his gun and shoots her, "Now the toy is broken-the crime against nature that God didn't want." Alraune dies, dissolving into a mandrake root body, with the seed of her true nature finally destroyed. Ten Brinken is arrested and then hanged for the murder of "his child".

== Cast ==
- Hildegard Knef, as Alraune
- Erich von Stroheim, as Jacob ten Brinken
- Karlheinz Böhm, as Frank Braun
- Harry Meyen, as Count "Gerald" Geroldingen
- Rolf Henniger, as Wolf Gontram
- Harry Halm, as Doctor Mohn
- Hans Cossy, as Mathieu, the coachman
- Gardy Brombacher, as Lisbeth, the maid
- Trude Hesterberg, as Fürstin Wolkonska
- Julia Koschka, as Olga Wolkonska
- Denise Vernac, as Mademoiselle Duvaliere
- Arno Ebert
- Willem Holzboer

== Production ==
=== Development ===
In an Interview given back in February 1989 he stated how his involvement begin with "Carlton was Stapenhorst, and then there was an Austrian producer who made his money primarily from petrol stations and was a very stubborn, mindless, peasant person. He had a contract with Knef and, according to his idea, Knef should be The Mandrake after The Sinner (1951) and Erich von Stroheim the genius-crazy scientist."

Even from its earliest stage, Alraune was stirring controversy. Just the announcement "Erich von Stroheim and Hildegard Knef in Alraune" led to a scandal. The church pulpits were spoken against the film, against the topic of artificial insemination; at that time the church had a great influence on cultural politics. Stapenhorst was happy about the advertisement, but he also feared the power of the church. Our task now was to dramatize the magically demonic element in the sex and horror material in a Catholic affirmative....It was really an ordeal, I think we wrote 16 versions of the script and changed it until the shoot. Now Stapenhorst, who was an old professional, had once had a blackout and Stroheim had the right to write his own dialogues. And Stroheim, who used to be a great director, now saw himself as a writer and came every morning with four pages of new text and from the well-behaved version that we had struggled to find, again and again made Stroheim a sharp horror film. But the audience didn't want horror, the war was still deep in everyone's bones. And the church didn't want sex..."

=== Casting ===
At the time the cast was considered to be 'All-star", even more so as Eric von Stroheim was respectfully known as "one of the great silent film director", who had all but retired from acting by the time Alraune was to begin filming. Hildegard Knef had also achieved fame in both her native country Germany and international fame. Robert Craig would later write in his book, It Came from 1957: A Critical Guide to the Year's Science Fiction, Fantasy and Horror Films, that "Knef's sultry, smoking sexuality was perfect for her role...it gives the film much of its palpable tension".

=== Mise-en-scene ===
Alraune is rooted from an actual plant Mandrake, which is German for mandragora. While the book stays relatively faithful to the book, unlike the 1928 film, there is a shot in the film which depicts Alraune's wide eyed face fades out of focus into the grotesque version of a mandrake. The plant is deeply-rooted in German literature and folklore. The plant is believed to bring good fortune and solidarity while also bring death and destroying all who curate it. The film seems to suggest that when humanity forgets its place in the natural order, it is destined to be eradicated. Set Decoration was done by Robert Health with the costume design by Herbert Ploberger.

=== Music ===
The film's soundtrack and music was composed by Werner Richard Heymann, who had a well known career in the German industry and Hollywood. The only two songs on the soundtrack were sung by Hildegard Knef, with the songs "Heut' gefall' ich mir" and "Das Lied vom einsamen Mädchen" written by lyricist Robert Gilbert. The sound team consisted of Heinz Terworth and Klang-Film Eurocord.

== Release ==
Alraune was released in Germany on 23 October 1952 where it was distributed by Gloria-Filmverleih. In 1957 Hal Roach Junior's, Distributors Corporation of America released Alraune, now renamed Unnatural: The Fruit of Evil, in an English dubbed version to arthouse and grindhouse theaters. The English language version was recorded by the American Dubbing Company.

== Adaptations ==
A number of films and other works are based on or inspired by the novel Alraune.

Alraune (1952) is the fifth adaptation of Ewers' book, the first being the 1918 silent version directed by Michael Curtiz which has long been believed to no longer exist in studio archives. The second adaptation came shortly after which, despite the title, has very little to no connection to the novel other than the Mandrake root. A third adaptation was then released a decade later with Alraune (1928 film), a black and white version though silent, with it being widely considered the best adaptation which was directed by Henrik Galeen. In comparison to the film in 1928, C. Hooper Trask of The New York Times wrote, "if you like this sort of thing you'll find it a superior product. Heinrich Galeen has directed with photographic imagination—no question that the picture has atmosphere". In 1995 a character named "Professor Ten Brincken", in Kim Newman's vampire novel The Bloody Red Baron, is the 'mad scientist' who creates Alraune. A black and white miniseries of comics books was released between 1998 and 2004: Alraune, was illustrated by Tony Greis. The comic books deviate significantly from the novel as the main character is cursed and must live as if she is Alraune until she can find a way out from under the curse.

== Reception ==
In a contemporary review, Variety noted that "in the early 1900s, when the H. H. Ewers novel Alraune cut a swatch in the German-language world [...] the very thought of artificial insemination of humans was mentionable only in whispers." and that "times and sensations change." The review opined that Knef's acting had "limited range" and that von Stroheim produces "only a laboured setting for a range of costumes changes and phony thunderstorms for the lethal Alraune".

In regards to von Stroheim's performance, Kirkus Reviews wrote, "A magisterial, crazily comprehensive biographical study of the original renegade director" while Times Literary Supplement wrote " A monument to the awful Good Old Days of an infant Hollywood"

Michael Den Boer writes that "Though this film has a Gothic Horror vibe, it's far-fetched premise ventures into the realm of science fiction. With that being said, there is one area where this film does not fully deliver in regards to its most unusual premise. And that is how the film does not exploit the more salacious aspects of its premise and how the narrative resembles something more akin to what one would expect from a melodrama".

Dennis Schwartz "It's a hokum sci-fi film that only resonates because Von Stroheim is at his Prussian best as a man possessed by his incestuous love for his foster daughter and arrogant about his superior intellect. Von Stroheim's a treat to watch, but it's still a dull visual film that never made good use of its unusual premise and was never emotionally satisfying as a drama."

== See also ==
- Artificial insemination
- Science fiction
- West Germany
- German folklore
- Cinema of Germany
- Black and white

== Bibliography ==
- Wingrove, David (1985). Science Fiction Film Source Book. Harlow, Essex, England: Longman. ISBN 978-0-582-89310-8.
- Willis, Donald, ed. (1985). Variety's Complete Science Fiction Reviews. Garland Publishing Inc. p. 93. ISBN 978-0-8240-6263-7.
