= Alraune, die Henkerstochter, genannt die rote Hanne =

1918 film

- Lobby card for the U.S. release
- Directed by: Eugen Illés; Joseph Klein
- Written by: Hanns Heinz Ewers (novel); Carl Froelich; Georg Tatzelt
- Starring: Max Auzinger; Joseph Klein
- Cinematography: Eugen Illés
- Release date: 1918
- Running time: 88 minutes
- Country: German Empire
- Languages: Silent film with; German intertitles

Alraune, die Henkerstochter, genannt die rote Hanne (Alraune, the Hangman's Daughter, Named Red Hanna) is a 1918 silent science fiction horror film directed by Eugen Illés and Joseph Klein and starring Max Auzinger. The film was produced by Luna-Film and distributed by Natural Film GmbH. The art direction was by Artur Günther. Alraune, die Henkerstochter, genannt die rote Hanne was released in the US under the title Sacrifice.

== Inspiration ==
Despite the title, this film has very little connection to the 1911 novel by Hanns Heinz Ewers, with the only reference being to the Mandrake root which plays a role in saving the dying child. In contrast to the Hungarian film by the same name, and released the same year, an intact version can still be found at George Eastman International Museum of Photography and Film.

== Plot ==
A doctor uses the sperm of a dead man to impregnate a prostitute. The resultant child then grows up only to turn against the man who created her.

== Cast ==
In alphabetical order

- Max Auzinger
- Joseph Klein
- Friedrich Kühne
- Ernst Rennspies
- Tatjana Sand
- Gustav Adolf Semler
- Hilde Wolter as Alraune
