= The Sorcerer's Apprentice (Ewers novel) =

1910 novel by Hanns Heinz Ewers

Der Zauberlehrling (The Sorcerer's Apprentice) is a novel by Hanns Heinz Ewers, one of numerous works inspired in various ways by Goethe's poem of the same name.

Ewers' first book, it was published in 1910. An English translation was published in America in 1927.

It introduces the character of Frank Braun, who, like Ewers himself, is a writer, historian, philosopher, and world traveller with a decidedly Nietzschean morality. The story concerns Braun's attempts to manipulate a small cult of Evangelical Christians in a small Italian mountain village for his own financial gain, and the horrific results which ensue.

Braun returned in sequels by Ewers, the 1911 Alraune where he creates a Frankenstein-like female creature and the 1921 Vampyr where he is transformed into a blood-drinking creature.

Although Ewers eventually became attracted to the Nazi Party, Frank Braun is depicted as having a Jewish mistress, Lotte Levi, who is also a patriotic German. This was one of the factors which ended Ewers' popularity with the Nazi leadership.
