= Alraune (1930 film) =

1930 film directed by Richard Oswald

- German film program page for Alraune
- Directed by: Richard Oswald
- Screenplay by: Charlie K. Roellinghoff; Robert Weisbach
- Based on: Alraune by Hanns Heinz Ewers
- Produced by: Richard Oswald
- Starring: Brigitte Helm; Albert Bassermann; Harald Paulsen
- Cinematography: Günther Krampf
- Music by: Bronislau Kaper
- Production company: Richard Oswald-Produktion GmbH
- Release date: 2 December 1930 (Germany)
- Running time: 103 minutes
- Country: Germany

Alraune is a German science fiction horror film directed by Richard Oswald. Like the 1928 version, this movie again features Brigitte Helm in the role of Alraune. This version aimed for greater realism but is still based upon the original German myth. It was shot at the Babelsberg Studios in Potsdam. The film's sets were designed by the art directors Otto Erdmann, Franz Schroedter and Hans Sohnle.

== Plot ==
A scientist, Professor Jakob ten Brinken, interested in the laws of heredity, impregnates a prostitute in a laboratory with the semen of a hanged murderer. The prostitute conceives a female child who has no concept of love, whom the professor adopts. The girl, Alraune, suffers from obsessive sexuality and perverse relationships throughout her life. She learns of her unnatural origins and avenges herself against the professor.

== Cast ==
- Brigitte Helm as Alraune ten Brinken/Alma, a bar girl
- Albert Bassermann as Privy Councillor ten Brinken
- Harald Paulsen as Frank Braun
- Adolf E. Licho as Attorney-at-law Manasse
- Agnes Straub as Fuerstin Wolkonski
- Bernhard Goetzke as Dr. Petersen
- Martin Kosleck as Wolfgang Petersen
- Käthe Haack as Frau Raspe
- Ivan Koval-Samborsky as Raspe
- Liselotte Schaak as Olga Wolkonski
- Paul Westermeier as Von Walter
- Henry Bender as The innkeeper
- Elsa Bassermann as A lady
- Wilhelm Bendow

== Release ==
Alraune was first shown in Germany at the Gloria-Palast theatre on 2 December 1930.

== Critical reception ==
From contemporary reviews, The New York Times described the film in 1934 as a "highly interesting production… Brigitte Helm, the versatile German actress, is the centre of the story… Her work is up to the high standard she has established in several foreign language pictures that have reached New York. Albert Bassermann, one of Germany's best veteran actors, is excellent as the scientist whose efforts to emulate the wonder-workers of the ancient days bring so much trouble upon nearly all involved in the affair, regardless of their innocence or guilt. The support is first class… Although this picture was made almost four years ago, the sound reproduction and photography are clear. The direction is competent." "Magnus." of Variety dismissed the film as being "very low level and involves ghastly ideas by Hanns Heinz Ewers, the picture is bad and silly." Magnus felt that actors Agnes Straub and Albert Bassermann were "not well handled in this instance" and that director Oswald "is so inferior in his direction that good actors are wasted."
