= Alraune (1918 film) =

1918 Hungarian horror film

- German release poster
- Directed by: Michael Curtiz; Edmund Fritz
- Written by: Hanns Heinz Ewers (novel); Richárd Falk
- Starring: Géza Erdélyi; Gyula Gál
- Release date: 1918
- Running time: 80 minutes
- Country: Hungary
- Languages: Silent; Hungarian intertitles

Alraune is a 1918 Hungarian science fiction horror film directed by Michael Curtiz and Edmund Fritz. It starred Géza Erdélyi. Little is known about this film, and it is believed to be lost. Alraune is German for mandrake. The film is based on the novel Alraune by German novelist Hanns Heinz Ewers that was published in 1911.

== Plot ==
The plot is a variation on the original legend of Alraune, in which a mad scientist creates a beautiful — but demonic — child from the forced union between a woman and a mandrake root fed by the blood of a hanged man.

== Cast ==
- Gyula Gál as Professor Brinken
- Rózsi Szöllösi as Alraune
- Kálmán Körmendy as Frank Braun
- Böske Malatinszky as Alma Raune, Mother of Alraune
- Géza Erdélyi as Farkas Gontran
- Andor Kardos as Sebestyén Gontran, Legal Adviser
- András Krupka as Instructor Petersen (credited as Andor K. Kovács)
- Károly Árnyai as Manesse Attorney
- Margit Lux
- Violetta Szlatényi
- Jenő Törzs
- Viktor Daniel
- Boleszlav Szobierszki

== See also ==
- Michael Curtiz filmography
- List of lost films
- Alraune (1928 film)

== Bibliography ==
- Wingrove, David. Science Fiction Film Source Book (Longman Group Limited, 1985)
