= Viennese Singing Sisters =

- The group with seven members, in the early 1930s

Background information
- Also known as: Edmund Fritz's Singing Babies, Singing Babies, Viennese Seven Singing Sisters, Viennese Six Singing Sisters, The Seven Singing Sisters
- Origin: Austria
- Genres: Close harmony singing of popular and classical songs
- Years active: 1930–1938
- Label: Various

The Viennese Singing Sisters (AKA Edmund Fritz's Singing Babies, Singing Babies, Viennese Seven (sometimes, Six) Singing Sisters, and The Seven Singing Sisters) was a close harmony female singing group which originated in Austria in the late 1920s or in 1930, and which was active there, elsewhere in Europe, and in the Americas until the late 1930s. It made recordings, and appeared on radio and television and in film. It consisted of singers with vocal ranges from high soprano to contralto, one of whom would also play piano accompaniment. At various times, it had six or seven members. Despite the name, it seems never to have included any sisters.

== History ==
The history of the group is poorly documented. It may have been founded in Vienna by Edmund Fritz (also known as a movie actor and director); possibly in the late 1920s; certainly by 1930, when it made its first recordings. In the group's early days, it was called Edmund Fritz's Singing Babies.

In March 1930, a playlist records that the group performed on a German radio programme Funkstunde. In May 1930, the group recorded four songs for Electrola, which were released on two 78 rpm singles. In September and October 1930, it recorded four more songs for Electrola, unreleased at the time and thought to be lost. Also in 1930, Fritz starred in the German short film Die Singenden Babies (English: The Singing Babies), apparently lost. The title suggests that the group may have appeared in the film, but it is not known whether or not they did.

In 1931, the group recorded four songs in Milan for Columbia Records, three of which had Italian titles. The same year, it gave a radio concert in the Netherlands. Also in 1931, the group appeared in the Otto Preminger film Die Große Liebe, under the name Die Singing Babies von Edmund Fritz.

In 1932, the group appeared in the film Baby, starring Anny Ondra, in which it performed the songs "Ich lieb' dich, I love you, je t'aime" and "Auf Wiederseh'n Baby". Recordings of the former song, and of a French version of the latter under the title "Au revoir Baby", were released. Those recordings were credited to Singing Babies, suggesting that the group was no longer associated with Fritz, who does not appear in the group's later story; the reason for that is not known.

In 1933, the group recorded six songs in London, under the name Viennese Seven Singing Sisters. In 1934, it appeared in the film Annette in Paradise (AKA Ein Kuss nach Ladenschluss), credited as Singing Babies.

In March 1934, according to the recollection of Werner Doege of the Harmony Boys, the group toured Switzerland.

In February 1935, according to the magazine A Noite, the group performed at the Cassino da Urca in Rio de Janeiro, Brazil. In March 1935, it recorded two songs in Milan.

In 1936, the group appeared in the Brazilian film Noches carioca.

In 1937 and 1938, the group appeared in two short films made by British Pathé: The Coconut Grove – Cabaret Time After Midnight (soundtrack lost) (The Coconut Grove was a London nightclub), and Viennese Singing Sisters. British Pathé have uploaded the song "Memories of Chopin" from Viennese Singing Sisters to their YouTube channel; the group then contained only six members. "Memories of Chopin" is a vocal arrangement, in German, of Chopin's Étude Op. 10, No. 3 in E flat for solo piano. In 1938, the group toured Argentina. In September – November 1938, the group appeared in three episodes of the BBC Television programme Cabaret; in the first as The Viennese Singing Sisters, and in the other two as The Six Viennese Singing Sisters. In November 1938, the group gave a 20-minute performance broadcast by two BBC regional radio stations, as The Viennese Singing Sisters.

By early 1939, the group had disbanded. Some of them were Jewish, or were married to Jews. In 1938, Austria was incorporated into Nazi Germany by the Anschluss, and they could no longer safely perform there. Some members relocated to Argentina, some to the United States of America.

In the 1940s, some of the members who had relocated to Argentina formed a group called Singing Babies, and toured Argentina and Bolivia. That group may have contained only two or three of the original members.. A history of the group was published in 2015 by Karsten Lehl, Wolfgang Schneidereit, Andreas Wellen, Josef Westner: Die Singing Babies. Eine Spurensuche. In: Fox auf 78, Sammlermagazin (Nr. 28), 2015. S. 52-59.

== Members ==
The group included, at various times:(see the photo album link below for a playbill from the South American tour with each member's name listed next to their picture)

- Lilo Alexander, early to mid-1930s, who relocated to New York City, and recorded:

"Jeepers Creepers" (with A. C. Allan's Orchestra), Sahibinen Sesi (Turkish subsidiary of the Gramophone Company) AX 2263 (Note: Confirmed by reliable record label information contained in YouTube videos and/or found in Google images.)
"Lili Marleen (Vor der Kaserne)" / "Komm in meinen Rosengarten" (with Georg Gärtner), 7" 45rpm single Continental Records (NYC) C-45-060

- Erni Delaan, early to mid-1930s (listed as Delau in one playbill)
- Daisy Doring (or, Doerling?), early to mid-1930s
- Ira Eneri (Irina Maar), early to mid-1930s, who relocated to New York City (the pianist)
- Rutby Frerichs, early to mid-1930s
- Friederike ("Fritzi") Lindberg (née Schlichter) (born 1900), early to mid-1930s; wife of Finnish singer Helge Lindberg (1887–1928); director of the group c. 1938; relocated to Argentina in 1939, where she ran an afternoon tea cafe called The Atelier in Martínez, Buenos Aires
- Erna Maas, early to mid-1930s
- Eva Oplatek (1935–37); the latest-surviving member of the group; who relocated to London
- Petra ("Peter") van der Velden (a German); who relocated to Argentina in 1939

== Discography ==
Berlin, May 1930

- "Grüß mir mein Hawaii" – Electrola EG 1909
- "Fox dei lilas" – Electrola EG 1909
- "Die blonde Helene" – Electrola EG 1910
- "Mädchen, wollt ihr gefallen" – Electrola EG 1910

Berlin, September and October 1930

- "Bei uns ist immer Sonnenschein" – Electrola, unreleased
- "Ja, so ein Mädel" – Electrola, unreleased
- "Sieben kleine Tillergirls" – Electrola, unreleased
- "Stadt der Liebe" – Electrola, unreleased

Milan, April or May 1931

- "Soli, soli" – Columbia CQ 664
- "My Boy" – Columbia CQ 664
- "Come rosa sboccia amore" – Columbia CQ 665
- "Lisabetta va alla moda" – Columbia CQ 665

Prague, April 1932

- "Donauwalzer" – Ultraphon AP 744

Berlin, May 1932

- "Bei uns ist immer Sonnenschein" – thought to be unreleased
- Edmund Fritz's Singing Babies, "Wir sind ja heut' so glücklich" – Odeon A 161216a
- Edmund Fritz's Singing Babies, "An der schönen blauen Donau" – Odeon A 161216b
- "Ja, so ein Mädel" – Odeon 186288b

Berlin, November 1932

- Singing Babies, "Ich lieb' dich, I love you, je t'aime" – Gloria GO 10462a
- "Auf Wiederseh'n, Baby" – Gloria GO 10462; Singing Babies, "Auf Wiederseh'n Baby, dich vergeß' ich nie" A-169137b
- "Trois mots" – Odeon 250338
- "Au revoir, Baby" – Odeon 250338

London, June 1933

- Viennese Seven Singing Sisters, "Cuban Tango" – Regal Zonophone MR 960; included on the 1997 compilation CD Sweetest Harmony: 25 Vintage Harmony Groups
- Viennese Seven Singing Sisters, "Whistling in the Dark" – Regal Zonophone MR 960
- "The Blue Danube" – Regal Zonophone MR 1049
- "Garland of Schubert Songs" – Regal Zonophone MR 1308
- "Italian Serenade" – Regal Zonophone MR 1308

London, September 1933

- "My Marguerita" – Regal Zonophone MR 1049

London, Summer 1934

- The Seven Singing Sisters, "Selection from Lilac Time" – 10" 78 rpm single Sterno 1467
- The Seven Singing Sisters, "International Selection" – 10" 78 rpm single Sterno 1467

Milan, March 1935

- "Hungarian Rhapsody No. 2" – Regal Zonophone MR 1755
- "William Tell Overture" – Regal Zonophone MR 1755; included on the 2000 compilation CD 1914–1946 – Crazy & Obscure: NoveltySongs

Hollywood, August or September 1936

- "Luar do sertao" – Victor 33925
- "Guacyra" – Victor 33925
