= Edmund Fritz =

Edmund Fritz (before 1918 – after 1932) was an Austrian (possibly Hungarian-born) actor, film director, and manager of at least one musical group.

He was co-director of the 1918 film Alraune, a Hungarian science fiction horror film, believed to be lost.

He appeared in the 1930 film Die singenden Babies (English: The Singing Babies), believed to be lost, which may also have featured his female vocal group Singing Babies (AKA Die Singing Babies von Edmund Fritz, and Edmund Fritz's Singing Babies; see Viennese Singing Sisters).

He appeared in the 1931 Otto Preminger film Die große Liebe (English: The Great Love). Die Singing Babies von Edmund Fritz appeared in the same film.

In 1932, Edmund Fritz's Singing Babies recorded the 78 rpm single "Wir sind ja heut' so glücklich" / "An der schönen blauen Donau" (Odeon A 161216).
