= Annette in Paradise =

1934 film directed by Max Obal

- Directed by: Max Obal
- Written by: Balder-Olden (play); Carl Rössler (play); Friedrich Walther; Georg C. Klaren
- Produced by: Ernst Kobosil; Georg Witt
- Starring: Ursula Grabley; Hans Söhnker; Ida Wüst
- Cinematography: Otto Heller
- Edited by: Munni Obal
- Music by: Will Meisel
- Production companies: Georg Witt-Film; Wolfram-Film
- Distributed by: Aafa-Film
- Release date: 7 March 1934
- Countries: Germany; Czechoslovakia
- Language: German

Annette in Paradise (German: Annette im Paradies) is a 1934 German-Czech musical film directed by Max Obal and starring Ursula Grabley, Hans Söhnker and Ida Wüst. A separate Czech language version was also released.

The film's sets were designed by Stepán Kopecký.

== Cast ==
- Ursula Grabley as Annette
- Hans Söhnker as Hans Siebert
- Ida Wüst as Tante Olga
- Max Gülstorff as Direktor Bertusch
- Oscar Sabo as Papa Stelzke
- Jessie Vihrog as Trude
- Hans Joachim Schaufuß as Maxe
- Singing Babies as Singers

== Bibliography ==
- Bock, Hans-Michael; Bergfelder, Tim, eds. (2009). The Concise Cinegraph: Encyclopaedia of German Cinema. New York: Berghahn Books. ISBN 978-1-57181-655-9.
