= Vampire (Ewers novel) =

1921 novel by Hanns Heinz Ewers

- Author: Hanns Heinz Ewers
- Original title: Vampir
- Language: German
- Publisher: Paul Steegemann Verlag
- Publication date: 1921
- Publication place: Germany
- English publication date: 20 September 1934
- Pages: 478

Vampire (German: Vampir) is a 1921 novel by the German writer Hanns Heinz Ewers.

== Plot ==
The novel is set in the United States during World War I and follows a German propaganda operative, Frank Braun, who struggles with a mysterious ailment and spends time with his devoted half-Jewish mistress. It was the last of Ewers' three novels about Braun. It was in parts inspired by Ewers' personal experiences as a pro-German propagandist in the United States during the war.

== Publication ==
Paul Steegemann Verlag published the book in 1921. An English translation was published in the United States in 1934 with several passages cut out. The American scholar Lisa Lampert-Weissig describes them as "passages depicting pedophilia, as well as Ewers' anti-American rhetoric, and his offensive racist language concerning people of color". Lampert-Weissig writes that the novel presents an example of the connection between "vampirism and early twentieth-century discourses of race", complicated by Ewers' combination of overt philo-Semitism and German nationalism.
