= The Bloody Red Baron =

1995 novel by Kim Newman

- First edition
- Author: Kim Newman
- Cover artist: Tony Greco
- Language: English
- Series: Anno Dracula series
- Genre: Alternate history, horror
- Publisher: Carroll & Graf
- Publication date: 1995
- Publication place: United States
- Media type: Print (hardback & paperback)
- Pages: 358 (hardback)
- ISBN: 0-7867-0252-4
- OCLC: 33269558
- Dewey Decimal: 813/.54 20
- LC Class: PR6064.E9277 B57 1995
- Preceded by: Anno Dracula
- Followed by: Dracula Cha Cha Cha

Anno Dracula: The Bloody Red Baron, or simply The Bloody Red Baron, is a 1995 alternate history/horror novel by British author Kim Newman. It is the second book in the Anno Dracula series and takes place during the Great War, 30 years after the first novel.

== Plot ==
The book takes place during World War I and explores the Diogenes Club's efforts to investigate Germany's attempt to make powerful, undead fliers. Leading the German operations are the likes of Rotwang, Doctor Caligari and Doctor Mabuse. One of their more successful efforts is an undead flier known as the Red Baron. The story also features Edgar Allan Poe as a vampire writer assigned to ghostwrite the Red Baron's autobiography.

== Setting ==
The book is set in an alternate history universe in which Professor Van Helsing failed in his efforts to kill Count Dracula. This resulted in a vampire proliferation across the world. The book combines a large number of historical and fictional characters, as did its predecessor, Anno Dracula, and pays tribute to a great many World War I movies and novels.

== Characters ==
The novel features numerous characters from other media, including TV and movies, as well as published novels and short stories. Some are directly named, while others are described. The following list is far from complete.

=== Central Powers ===
==== Fictional references ====
- Count Dracula — Dracula by Bram Stoker
- Brides of Dracula — Dracula by Bram Stoker
- Paul Bäumer — All Quiet on the Western Front, anti-war novel by Erich Maria Remarque
- Doctor Caligari — The Cabinet of Dr. Caligari (1920) film
- Baron von Emmelman — Comic book character The Heap
- Hammer - Comic book character Enemy Ace
- Hardt - The Spy in Black (1939) film
- General Karnstein — Carmilla by Sheridan Le Fanu
- Doctor Mabuse - Norbert Jacques' literary works
- Baron Meinster — The Brides of Dracula (1960) film
- Doctor Orlof - The Awful Dr. Orloff (1962) film
- Count Orlok - Nosferatu (1922) film
- Hjalmar Poelzig — From the 1934 film The Black Cat
- Robur — Robur the Conqueror by Jules Verne
- Rotwang - Metropolis (1927) film
- Theo Kretschmar-Schuldorff — From the film The Life and Death of Colonel Blimp
- Bruno Stachel - The Blue Max (1966) film
- Erich von Stalhein — Biggles series by W. E. Johns
- Professor Jakob Ten Brincken — Alraune (1911) novel
- Armand Tesla - The Return of the Vampire (1943) film
- Lemora - Lemora: A Child's Tale of the Supernatural (1971) film
- Faustine - Algernon Charles Swinburne published a poem of the same name
- Gregory von Bayern -- The Dragon Waiting by John M. Ford
- Chateau du Malinbois - Stories of vampire-haunted Averoigne by Clark Ashton Smith
  - Renamed Schloß Adler (The Castle of the Eagles) - Where Eagles Dare (1968) film
- Doktor Krueger - recurring villain of G8 and His Battle Aces, first appearing in The Bat Staffel (1933)

==== Historic figures ====
- Oswald Boelcke
- Hanns Heinz Ewers
- Franz Ferdinand
- Franz Joseph I
- Anthony Fokker
- Erich von Falkenhayn
- Hermann Göring
- Fritz Haarmann
- Mata Hari
- Paul von Hindenburg
- Adolf Hitler
- Max Immelmann
- Franz Kafka
- Peter Kürten
- Béla Lugosi
- Erich Ludendorff
- Helmuth von Moltke
- Friedrich Wilhelm Murnau
- Edgar Allan Poe
- Willi Sanke
- Peter Strasser
- Ernst Udet
- Manfred von Richthofen
- Lothar von Richthofen
- Sophie, Duchess of Hohenberg
- Wilhelm II
- Ferdinand von Zeppelin

=== Allies ===
==== Fictional ====
- "Red" Albright - Captain Midnight radio show
- Kent Allard - The Shadow series by Walter B. Gibson
- James "Jim" Apperson - From the 1925 film The Big Parade
- Doctor Arrowsmith - Arrowsmith, novel by Sinclair Lewis
- Ashenden - Ashenden: Or the British Agent, novel by W. Somerset Maugham
- Jake Barnes - The Sun Also Rises, novel by Ernest Hemingway
- Eddie Bartlett - The Roaring Twenties film
- James Bigglesworth - From the Biggles series by W. E. Johns
- Lady Jennifer Buckingham - Doctor Who serial The War Games
- Jerry Dandridge - Fright Night film
- Clifford Chatterley - Lady Chatterley's Lover, novel by D. H. Lawrence
- Caleb Croft - Grave of the Vampire (or "Seed of Terror") film
- Courtney - The Dawn Patrol (1938 film) (played by Errol Flynn, hence the Antipodean accent and Tasmanian origin)
- Tom Cundall, Bill Williamson - Winged Victory, novel by Victor Maslin Yeates
- Sergeant Dravot - The Man Who Would Be King by Rudyard Kipling
- Bulldog Drummond - the works of H. C. McNeile
- Augustus "Gussie" Fink-Nottle - the Bertie Wooster series by P. G. Wodehouse.
- James Gatz (Jay Gatsby) - The Great Gatsby by F. Scott Fitzgerald
- Private Charles Godfrey - From the TV series Dad's Army (referred to as "the Quaker stretcher-bearer, Godfrey")
- Mina Harker - Dracula by Bram Stoker
- Ginger Hebblethwaite - From the Biggles series by W. E. Johns
- Mycroft Holmes - From the works of Arthur Conan Doyle
- Sherlock Holmes - From the works of Arthur Conan Doyle
- Nick Knight - From the TV series Forever Knight
- Kostaki - From The Pale Lady by Alexandre Dumas, père
- Algernon "Algy" Lacey - From the Biggles series by W. E. Johns
- Bertie Lissie - From the Biggles series by W. E. Johns; an upper-class character who wears a monocle, utters clichéd expressions, and bears some resemblance to P. G. Wodehouse's Bertie Wooster.
- Cary Lockwood - From the 1931 film, The Last Flight (played by Richard Barthelmess, who played Courtney in the original 1930 film The Dawn Patrol).
- Lt. Col. Andrew Blodgett "Monk" Mayfair - One of Doc Savage's five assistants
- General Mireau, Colonel Dax - From the movie Paths of Glory
- Doctor Moreau - From the novel The Island of Doctor Moreau by H. G. Wells
- Ouran- From the 1932 film Island of Lost Souls
- Roger Penderel - From the 1927 novel Benighted by J.B. Priestley
- Kate Reed - A character from Dracula who was cut from the final novel
- Lord Ruthven - From the short story The Vampyre by Dr. John William Polidori
- Severin - From the film Near Dark
- George Sherston - From the Sherston trilogy by Siegfried Sassoon
- Count Sinestre - From the film Devils of Darkness
- Captain Elliot Spencer - The original identity of Pinhead from the movie Hellraiser
- Simon Templar - From The Saint novels and TV series.
- Tietjens - Probably Christopher Tietjens from "Parade's End" by Ford Maddox Ford
- Dr. Thorndyke - From the novels of R. Austin Freeman
- Isolde - From the French film, "Le frisson des vampires"
- Jedediah Leland - From Orson Welles's Citizen Kane
- Herbert West - From the short story "Herbert West–Reanimator" by H. P. Lovecraft
- Lord Peter Wimsey - From the Peter Wimsey novels of Dorothy L. Sayers (referred to as "the second son of the Duke of Denver")
- Wilson - From the Biggles series of books
- Clive Wynne-Candy - From the film, The Life and Death of Colonel Blimp.

==== Real ====
- H. H. Asquith
- Albert Ball
- Thomas Beecham
- Roy Brown
- Edith Cavell
- Winston Churchill
- Arthur Rhys Davids
- Douglas Haig, 1st Earl Haig
- Lanoe Hawker
- Sydney Horler
- David Lloyd George
- Edmund Gosse
- Oswald Mosley
- Philippe Pétain
- Nicholas II of Russia
- Alexei Nikolaevich, Tsarevich of Russia
- Charles Nungesser
- John J. Pershing
- Mary Pickford
- Grigori Rasputin
- William Robertson
- Saki
- Mansfield Smith-Cumming
- J. R. R. Tolkien
- Hugh Trenchard
- King Victor of Britain
- H. G. Wells
- Henry Hughes Wilson
- Woodrow Wilson

=== Non-aligned ===
==== Fictional ====
- Fantômas - From the works of Marcel Allain and Pierre Souvestre
- Jules and Jim — From the movie Jules and Jim
- Arsène Lupin -From the works of Maurice Leblanc
- Perle von Mauren — From Carl Jacobi's Revelations in Black
- Oliver Mellors — From the novel Lady Chatterley's Lover
- Charles Plumpick — From the 1966 film King of Hearts
- Snoopy - From Peanuts by Charles M. Schulz
- Švejk — From The Good Soldier Švejk by Jaroslav Hašek
- Langstrom of Gotham University/Man-Bat - Robert Kirkland (Kirk) Langstrom of DC Comics' Batman fame; an anachronism of course
- Jacques Lantier - From Émile Zola's novel La Bête humaine
- Des Esseintes - From A rebours by Joris-Karl Huysmans
- Sadie Thompson - From the eponymous 1928 film
- Lola-Lola - From the 1930 German film, The Blue Angel
- Gigi - From the French novella Gigi by Colette
- Jiggs - From the 1958 American film, The Tarnished Angels
- Judex - From the 1912 silent French serial

==== Real ====
- Vladimir Lenin
