= Alraune =

1911 novel by Hanns Heinz Ewers

- First edition cover
- Author: Hanns Heinz Ewers
- Genre: Science fantasy, horror, dark fantasy, Gothic
- Publication date: 1911; 115 years ago

Alraune (German for Mandrake) is a novel by German novelist Hanns Heinz Ewers published in 1911. It is also the name of the female lead character. The book originally featured illustrations by Ilna Ewers-Wunderwald.

== Legend ==
The basis of the story of Alraune dates to the Middle Ages in Germany. The humanoid-shaped mandrake root or Mandragora officinarum was widely believed to be produced by the semen of hanged men under the gallows. Alchemists claimed that hanged men ejaculated after their necks were broken and that the earth absorbed their final "strengths". In some versions, it is blood instead of semen. The root itself was used in love philtres and potions while its fruit was supposed to facilitate pregnancy. Witches who "made love" to the mandrake root were said to produce offspring that had no feelings of real love and had no soul.

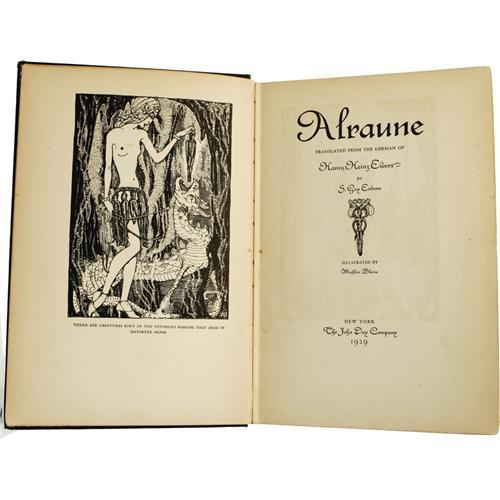
Title page of 1929 U.S. edition.

== Synopsis ==
The novel deviates from the myth by concentrating on the issues of artificial insemination and individuality: genetics versus environment. A scientist, Professor Jakob ten Brinken, interested in the laws of heredity, impregnates a prostitute in a laboratory with the semen of a hanged murderer. The prostitute conceives a female child who has no concept of love, whom the professor adopts. The girl, Alraune, suffers from obsessive sexuality and perverse relationships throughout her life. She learns of her unnatural origins and she avenges herself against the professor.

== Adaptations ==
A number of films and other works are based on or inspired by the novel Alraune.

- 1918: Alraune, an 80-minute Hungarian movie which is now believed to be lost
- 1918: Alraune, die Henkerstochter, genannt die rote Hanne, an 88-minute German movie directed by Eugen Illés
- 1928: Alraune, also known as Unholy Love, a 125-minute black and white, silent German film directed by Henrik (Heinrich) Galeen. It stars Brigitte Helm as Alraune and Paul Wegener as the scientist Professor Jakob ten Brinken. It uses the novel and is regarded by critics as the definitive version of Alraune. When this film was first shown in Britain, film censors removed the details of the woman's origins, thereby making the story and motivations confusing to British audiences.
- 1930: Alraune, also known as The Daughter of Evil, a 103-minute black and white German film directed by Richard Oswald and again starring Brigitte Helm as Alma Raune (Alraune). This was a sound remake of the 1928 film.
- 1952: Alraune, or Unnatural: The Fruit of Evil, a black and white German feature film directed by Arthur Maria Rabenalt. This had an all-star German cast including Hildegard Knef as Alraune and Erich von Stroheim as the scientist.
- 1998–2004: Alraune, a series of black and white German comic books illustrated by Tony Greis. The comic books deviate significantly from the novel. The main character is cursed and must live as if she is Alraune until she can find a way out from under the curse.

== See also ==
- Alruna
- Artificial insemination
- Gynoid
- Homunculus
- Nature versus nurture
- List of films made in Weimar Germany
