= The Science Fiction Film Source Book =

The Science Fiction Film Source Book is a book by David Wingrove published in 1985.

== Contents ==
The Science Fiction Film Source Book is a book consisting of list of science fiction film plot summaries, with additional information such as the producers and directors of the films.

== Reception ==
Dave Langford reviewed The Science Fiction Film Source Book for White Dwarf #73, and stated that "To pick a random example, the entry on Wizards dismisses it as 'comic-orientated' without even mentioning the influence of Vaughn Bode, or Ian Miller's powerfully effective backgrounds. Nitpicking, though, is a game with no ending."
