= Alraune (1928 film) =

1928 film

- Directed by: Henrik Galeen
- Screenplay by: Henrik Galeen
- Based on: Alraune by Hanns Heinz Ewers
- Produced by: Helmut Schreiber
- Starring: Brigitte Helm; Paul Wegener; Ivan Petrovich; Mia Pankau
- Cinematography: Franz Planer
- Music by: Willy Schmidt-Gentner
- Production company: Ama-Film GmbH
- Distributed by: Ama-Film GmbH
- Release date: 25 January 1928 (Berlin)
- Running time: 108 minutes
- Country: Germany
- Languages: Silent film; German intertitles

Alraune is a 1928 German silent science fiction horror film directed by Henrik Galeen and starring Brigitte Helm in which a prostitute is artificially inseminated with the semen of a hanged man. The story is based upon the legend of Alraune. In this version, the blasphemous sexual union causes the progeny (a daughter) to grow to adulthood quickly, behave in a sexually promiscuous fashion and cause the men who fall in love with her nothing but hardship, heartache and financial ruin, if not death.

== Plot ==
A wealthy Professor specializing in genetics is ambitious to conduct an experiment with a woman of "low social status", by artificially inseminating her with the semen of a hanged murderer. He instructs his young nephew, Franz, to obtain a woman from the "scum of society". Franz reluctantly finds a prostitute, and the experiment is performed on her.

The child from the experiment, Alraune, grows up to become a beautiful woman with a corrupted soul. The Professor adopts her as his daughter and sends her to a convent to study; she sneaks boyfriends into the convent and plays pranks on the nuns. Using her charm, she convinces a boyfriend to steal money from his parents and they elope together aboard a train. While eloping, Alraune attracts the attentions of a circus magician; he puts a mouse on Alraune's leg to surprise her, but she shows no fear. Her jealous boyfriend attacks the magician, leading to a scuffle.

Meanwhile, on learning about the experiment, the Professor's nephew Franz is appalled and warns his uncle about the consequences of violating the laws of nature. They then receive the news that Alraune is missing from the convent. After months of searching, the Professor tracks Alraune to a circus, where she is performing as the magician's assistant but also flirting with the lion tamer. The Professor confronts Alraune in her dressing room. Afraid of his reprimands, she decides to leave the circus and return home with him.

Alraune is happy for a time in her new life with her "father", who has fallen for her and wonders if her promiscuous nature is a consequence of her mother's promiscuity. However, when he forbids her marriage to a Viscount, she decides to elope, and that night she discovers the Professor's journal and discovers her origins. Angry at her "father" for having lied to her, she abandons the Viscount so that she can stay and seek revenge. Alraune continues to attract men and seduce the Professor, and finally reveals to him that she knows about her unnatural origins. He is delighted, as he has become obsessed; he writes in his journal that she either stays with him or he will kill her.

The next night, the Professor and Alraune visit a gambling club. Alraune's affluent lifestyle has depleted the Professor's finances, and he asks her to join him at a gambling table, believing the legend that mandrakes give good luck. After a winning streak, Alraune leaves the professor mid-round and rushes home to pack her things and escape. The Professor loses his winnings and returns home to find Alraune packing. He begs her to stay, sell her remaining jewels for money and move to a new place where they can find happiness. She replies that she certainly will, but not with him. Enraged, the Professor grabs a knife and pursues Alraune around the house. Luckily, Franz arrives in time to stop him attacking her. Franz spirits Alraune away, leaving the Professor condemned to a life of loneliness and insanity.

== Cast ==
- Brigitte Helm as Alraune ten Brinken
- Paul Wegener as Prof. Jakob ten Brinken
- Iván Petrovich as Franz Braun
- Wolfgang Zilzer as Wölfchen
- Louis Ralph as Der Zauberkünstler
- Hans Trautner as Der Dompteur
- John Loder as Der Vicomte
- Mia Pankau as Die Dirne
- Valeska Gert as Ein Mädchen von der Gasse
- Georg John as Der Mörder
- Alexander Sascha as Ein Herr im Coupé
- Heinrich Schroth as Ein Herr in der Bar

== Release ==
Alraune was first shown in Germany on 20 January 1928 in Berlin.

In the American release prints, the Alraune character was renamed Mandrake, the English word for Alraune. Brigitte Helm reprised the Alraune role again two years later when director Richard Oswald remade the film (with sound) in 1930.

== Critical reaction ==
From contemporary reviews In 1928, C. Hooper Trask of The New York Times wrote, "if you like this sort of thing you'll find it a superior product. Heinrich Galeen has directed with photographic imagination—no question that the picture has atmosphere"; and of Brigitte Helm, "all the promises of "Metropolis" are here fulfilled. To the vampire gallery, which runs from Theda Bara to Greta Garbo, let me add the German Brigitte. She lacks Greta's delectable weakness but she gives in its place power and depth. A most engaging evening's display of erotics." A review credited to "Trask" in Variety stated that Galeen "squeezes all the horror juice out of [Ewers story], and Brigitte Helm, the vamp, is at least 200 percent." proclaiming on Helm that "When will some American director take a look at this extraordinary fascinating girl. She has an individuality of her own."

From retrospective reviews, Troy Howarth noted that Brigitte Helm's performance in the film was "one of the most genuinely erotic of its time" and that Galeen should be "admired for approaching the material in such an adult and sophisticated manner....Alraune is, after his The Student of Prague (1926), easily his most impressive feature as director". In Phil Hardy's book Science Fiction, a reviewer referred to the film as the best of the five adaptations of Alraune, noting that Galeen allows for an "obsessive sexuality to suffuse the whole texture of the film with an intensity rarely equalled in the silent cinema (except perhaps in Murnau's Nosferatu)".

== Preservation ==
A copy of the film is held by George Eastman House.
