= Hanns Heinz Ewers =

German actor, poet, philosopher and writer

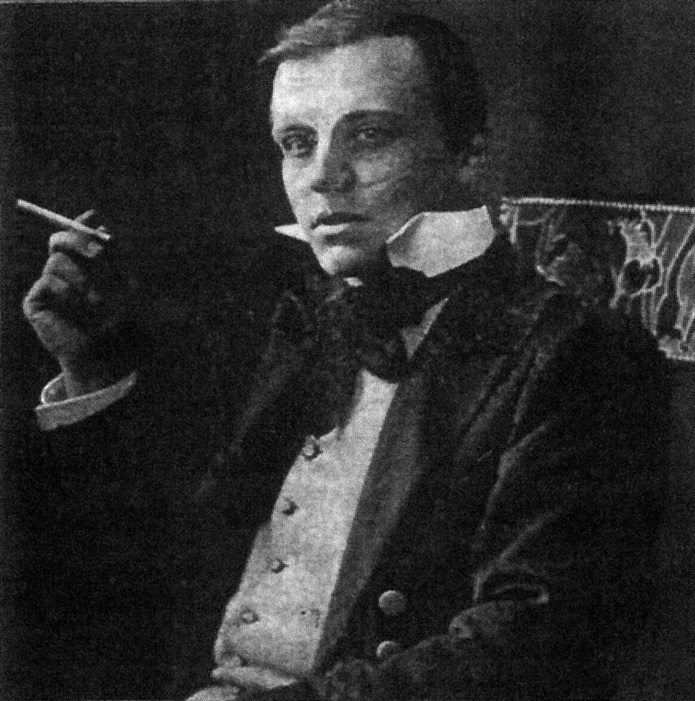
Hanns Heinz Ewers

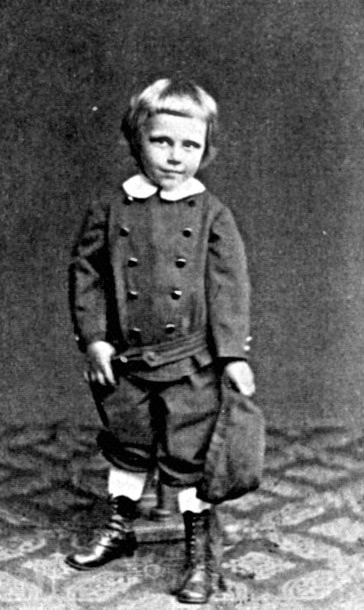
Hanns Heinz Ewers at the age of 4

Hanns Heinz Ewers (3 November 1871 – 12 June 1943) was a German actor, poet, philosopher, and writer of short stories and novels. While he wrote on a wide range of subjects, he is now known mainly for his works of horror, particularly his trilogy of novels about the adventures of Frank Braun, a character modeled on himself. The best known of these is Alraune (1911).

== Career ==
=== Early works ===
Born in Düsseldorf, Ewers started to write poetry when he was 17 years old. His first noticed poem was an obituary tribute to the German Emperor Frederick III.

Ewers earned his Abitur in March 1891. He then volunteered for the military and joined the Kaiser-Alexander-Gardegrenadier-Regiment Nr. 1, but was dismissed 44 days later because of myopia.

Ewers' literary career began with a volume of satiric verse, entitled A Book of Fables, published in 1901. That same year, he collaborated with Ernst von Wolzogen in forming a literary vaudeville theatre before forming his own such company, which toured Central and Eastern Europe before the operating expenses and constant interference from censors caused him to abandon the enterprise. A world traveler, Ewers was in South America at the beginning of World War I, and relocated to New York City, where he continued to write and publish.

Ewers' reputation as a successful German author and performer made him a natural speaker for the Imperial German cause to keep the United States from joining the war as an ally of Britain. Ewers toured cities with large ethnic German communities and raised funds for the German Red Cross.

During this period, he was involved with the "Stegler Affair". American shipping companies sympathetic to the fight against Imperial Germany reportedly aided the British in identifying German-descended passengers traveling to Germany to volunteer for the Kaiser's army. Many were arrested and interned in prison camps by the British Navy; eventually, German volunteers often required false passports to reach Europe unmolested. Ewers was implicated as a German agent by one of these ethnic Germans, Richard Stegler.

After the United States joined the war, he was arrested in 1918 as an "active propagandist," as the US government, as well as British and French intelligence agencies, asserted that Ewers was a German agent. They evidenced his travels to Spain during 1915 and 1916, both with an alias using a falsified Swiss passport. Later, a travel report in the archives of the German Foreign Office was discovered indicating that he may have been traveling to Mexico, perhaps to encourage Pancho Villa to hamper the U.S. military by an attack on the United States.

Ewers is associated with the pro-German George Sylvester Viereck, son of the German immigrant and reported illegitimate Hohenzollern offspring Louis Sylvester Viereck (a Social Democrat famous for sharing a prison cell with August Bebel), who was a member of the same Berlin student corps (fraternity) as Ewers.

Ewers' activities as an "Enemy Alien" in New York were documented by J. Christoph Amberger in the German historical journal Einst & Jetzt (1991). Amberger indicates arrival records which demonstrate that Ewers entered the United States in the company of a "Grethe Ewers," who is identified as his wife. Enemy Alien Office records refer to a recent divorce. The identity of this otherwise undocumented wife has never been established, with reference to her missing from most biographies.

As a German national he was sent to the internment camp at Fort Oglethorpe, Georgia. Ewers was never tried as a German agent in the United States. In 1921, he was released from the internment camp and returned to his native Germany.

=== Frank Braun trilogy ===
Ewers's first novel, Der Zauberlehrling (The Sorcerer's Apprentice), was published in 1910, with an English translation published in America in 1927. It introduces the character of Frank Braun, who, like Ewers, is a writer, historian, philosopher, and world traveler with a decidedly Nietzschean morality. The story concerns Braun's attempts to influence a small cult of Evangelical Christians in a small Italian mountain village for his own financial gain, and the horrific results which ensue.

This was followed in 1911 by Alraune, a reworking of the Frankenstein myth, in which Braun collaborates in creating a female homunculus or android by impregnating a prostitute with the semen from an executed murderer. The result is a young woman without morals, who commits numerous monstrous acts. Alraune was influenced by the ideas of the eugenics movement, especially the book Degeneration by Max Nordau. Alraune has been generally well received by historians of the horror genre; Mary Ellen Snodgrass describes Alraune as "Ewers' decadent masterwork", Brian Stableford argues Alraune "deserves recognition as the most extreme of all "femme fatale" stories" and E. F. Bleiler states the scenes in Alraune set in the Berlin underworld as among the best parts of the novel. The novel was filmed several times, most recently in a German version with Erich von Stroheim in 1952.

Bleiler notes "Both Alraune and The Sorcerer's Apprentice are remarkable for the emotion the author can arouse" and that Ewers' writing is, at its best, "very effective". However, Bleiler also argues Ewers' work is marred by "annoying pretentiousness, vulgarity, and a very obtrusive and unpleasant author's personality".

The third novel of the sequence, Vampire, published in 1921, concerns Braun's own eventual transformation into a vampire, drinking the blood of his Jewish mistress.

=== Later works ===
Another novel, Der Geisterseher (The Ghost-Seer), Ewers' completion of the Friedrich Schiller novel, was published in 1922; Ewers' version was received badly.

Ewers also wrote the novel Reiter in deutscher Nacht (Riders in the German Night) published in 1932.

Ewers wrote numerous short stories, those in Nachtmahr ("Nightmare") largely concern "pornography, blood sport, torture and execution". Stories translated into English include the often anthologised "The Spider" (1908), a story about a series of mysterious deaths in a Paris hotel room; "Blood", about knife fights to the death; and "The Execution of Damiens", a story about the execution of the 18th-century French criminal Robert-François Damiens that achieved some notoriety for its violence.

Ewers also published several plays, poems, fairy tales, opera librettos, and critical essays. These included Die Ameisen, translated into English as The Ant People, Indien und ich, a travelogue of his time in India, and a 1916 critical essay on Edgar Allan Poe, to whom he has often been compared. Indeed, Ewers is still considered by some as a major author in the evolution of the horror literary genre, cited as an influence by American horror writers such as H. P. Lovecraft and Guy Endore. Students of the occult are also attracted to his works, due to his longtime friendship and correspondence with Aleister Crowley. Ewers also translated several French writers into German, including Villiers de l'Isle-Adam.

Ewers also edited the eight-volume Galerie der Phantasten anthologies of horror and fantasy literature, featuring work by Poe, E. T. A. Hoffmann, Oskar Panizza, Honoré de Balzac, Alfred Kubin, Ewers' friend Karl Hans Strobl, Gustavo Adolfo Bécquer and Ewers himself.

During the time Ewers was writing his major horror stories, he was also giving lectures (between 1910 and 1925) on the topic Die Religion des Satan (The Religion of Satan), inspired by Stanisław Przybyszewski's 1897 German book Die Synagoge des Satan (The Synagogue of Satan).

He died on June 12, 1943, in his Berlin apartment. His ashes were buried on October 15 of the same year in the Düsseldorf North Cemetery (Nordfriedhof, Field Nr. 78, 55235-WE). In 1938, Ewers compiled his estate, which is now kept at the Heinrich Heine Institute in Düsseldorf.

== Movie work ==
Ewers was one of the first critics to recognize cinema as a legitimate art form, and wrote the scripts for numerous early examples of the medium, most notably The Student of Prague (1913), a reworking of the Faust legend which also included the first portrayal of a double role by an actor on the screen.

Nazi martyr Horst Wessel, then a member of the same corps (student fraternity) of which Ewers had been a member, acts as an extra in a 1926 version of the movie, also written by Ewers. Ewers was later commissioned by Adolf Hitler to write a biography of Wessel ("Horst Wessel- ein deutsches Schicksal"), which also was made into a movie.

== Nazi involvement ==
During the last years of the Weimar Republic, Ewers became involved with the burgeoning Nazi Party, attracted by its nationalism, its Nietzschean moral philosophy, and its cult of Teutonic culture, and joined the NSDAP in 1931. He did not agree with the party's anti-Semitism (his character Frank Braun has a Jewish mistress, Lotte Levi, who is also a patriotic German) and this and his homosexual tendencies soon ended his welcome with party leaders. In 1934 most of his works were banned in Germany, and his assets and property seized. Alfred Rosenberg was his main adversary in the party, but after submitting many petitions Ewers eventually secured the rescission of the ban. His last book Die schönsten Hände der Welt ("The most beautiful hands in the world") was published by the Zinnen Verlag (Munich, Vienna, Leipzig) in 1943. Ewers died from tuberculosis in the same year.

With the Nuremberg Laws of 1935, the disenfranchisement of German Jews was complete. Ewers supported his Jewish friends by obtaining exit visas for them to the USA or Great Britain.

Despite his great influence on 20th century fantasy and horror literature, Ewers remains out of favor in bourgeois literary circles (especially in the English-speaking world and Germany) because of his association with the Nazis. As a result, post-World War II editions of his works are often difficult to find, and earlier editions can command a premium price from collectors.

== Twenty-first-century translations ==
''Blood'' is a chapbook collection published in 1977 by Valcour and Krueger (San Diego, CA). It contains three stories: "The Mamaloi," "The White Maiden," and "Tomato Sauce."

In March 2009, Side Real Press issued an English language collection of short stories including some newly translated material. This was followed by a new uncensored translation of Alraune translated by Joe Bandel which sold out after one year. The Alraune Centennial Edition by Bandel Books Online was released in March 2011. The centennial edition translated by Joe Bandel contains an essay by Dr. Wilfried Kugel, noted Ewers biographer.

"Sorcerer's Apprentice", The First Volume in the Frank Braun trilogy was translated by Joe Bandel and published by Bandel Books Online in September 2012. This is the first uncensored English translation of "The Sorcerer's Apprentice". It includes an Introduction by Dr. Wilfried Kugel; the poems, "Prometheus" by Goethe, and "Hymn to Satan" by Carducci; "The Satanism of Hanns Heinz Ewers", "Duality-The Male", "Duality-The Female", and "Duality-Sexual Alchemy" by Joe Bandel and the complete text of "Synagogue of Satan" by Stanisław Przybyszewski also translated by Joe Bandel.

In 2016 Ajna Offensive published Markus Wolff's English translation of Ewers' 1922 novel Die Herzen der Könige (The Hearts of Kings).

== In popular culture ==
Ewers appears in Kim Newman's novel The Bloody Red Baron, as a predatory vampire who travels briefly with Edgar Allan Poe.

== Filmography ==
- 1913: de:Der Student von Prag (1913)
- 1913: de:Der Verführte
- 1913: de:Die Augen des Ole Brandis
- 1913: de:Die Eisbraut
- 1913: Die ideale Gattin
- 1913: de:Ein Sommernachtstraum in unserer Zeit
- 1914: Evinrude
- 1914: de:Die Launen einer Weltdame
- 1918: Alraune by de:Mihály Kertész und Ödön Fritz
- 1918: de:Alraune, die Henkerstochter, genannt die rote Hanne by de:Eugen Illés
- 1919: de:Alraune und der Golem by de:Nils Chrisander
- 1926: de:Der Student von Prag (1926) (Remake)
- 1928: Alraune by de:Henrik Galeen, with de:Brigitte Helm
- 1930: de:Fundvogel
- 1930: Alraune by de:Richard Oswald, with Brigitte Helm
- 1952: Alraune by de:Arthur Maria Rabenalt, with de:Hildegard Knef
