= Mandrake =

Toxic plant species with man-shaped roots

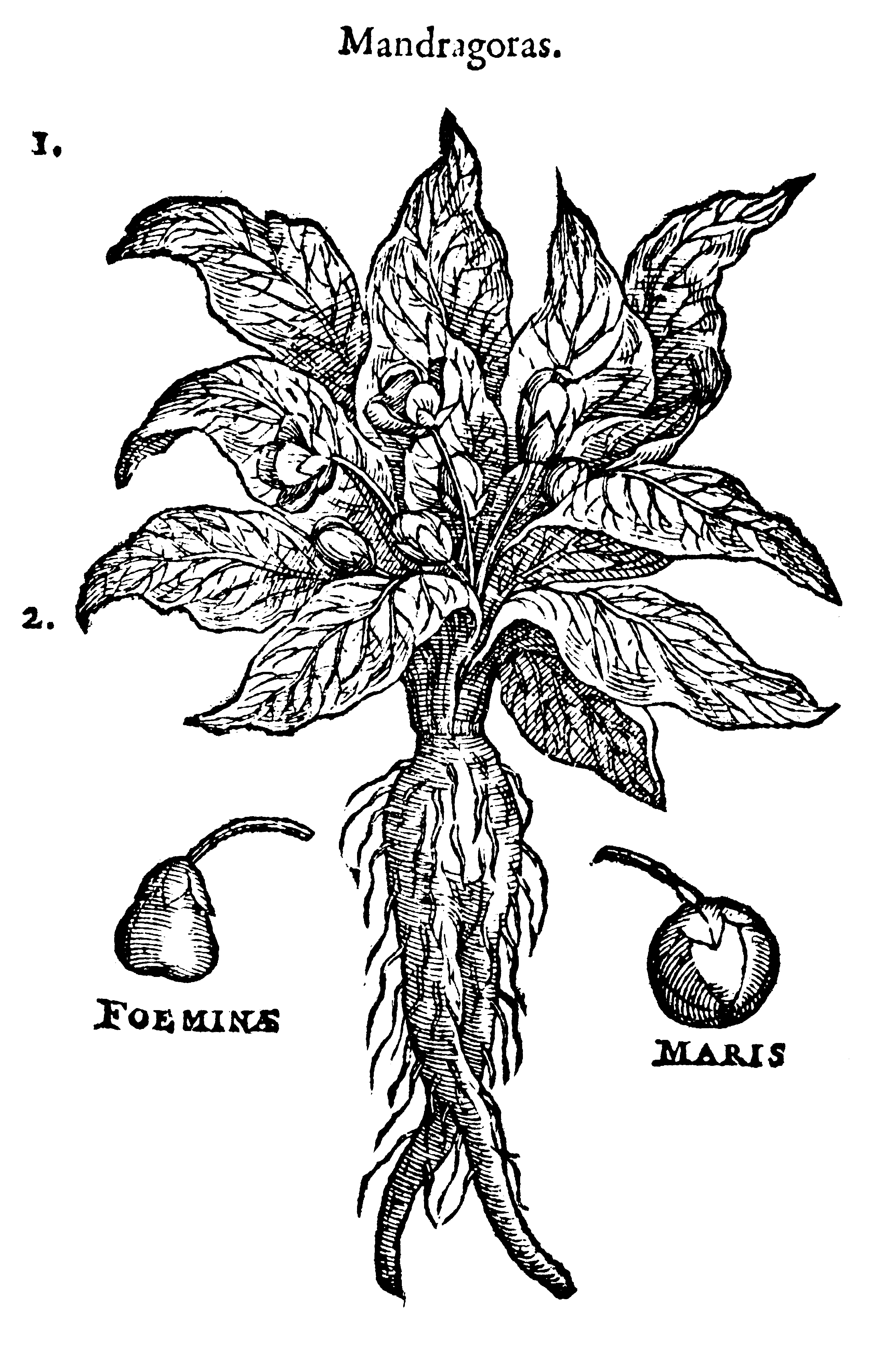
The so-called "female" and "male" mandrakes, from a 1583 illustration

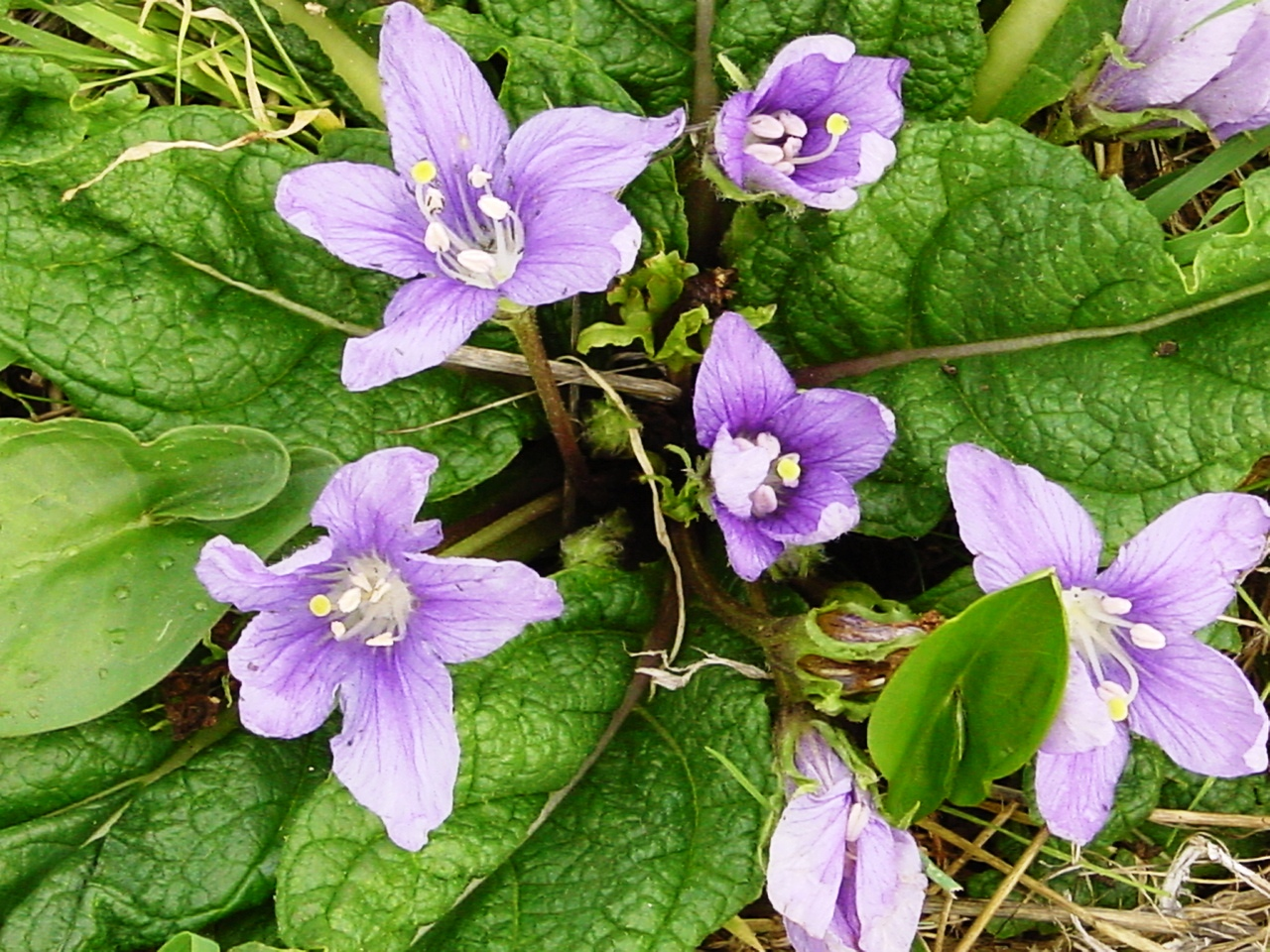
The flowers of Mandragora officinarum

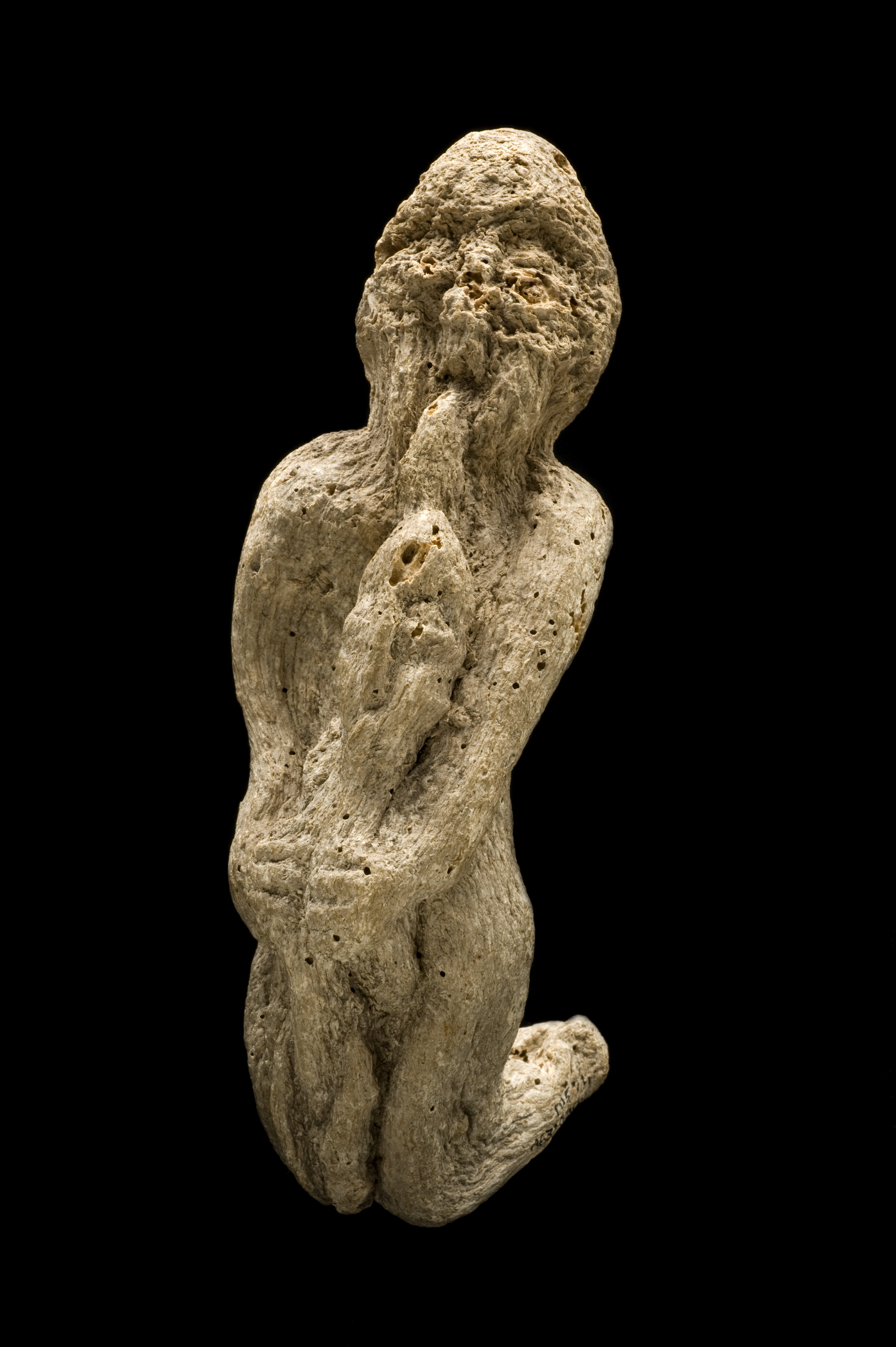
A carved mandrake root, 16th or 17th century (Wellcome Collection)

A mandrake is one of several toxic plant species with "man-shaped" roots and some uses in folk remedies. The roots by themselves may also be referred to as "mandrakes". The term primarily refers to nightshades of the genus Mandragora (in the family Solanaceae) found in the Mediterranean region.

Other unrelated plants also sometimes referred to as "mandrake" include Bryonia alba (the English mandrake, in the family Cucurbitaceae) and Podophyllum peltatum (the American mandrake, in the family Berberidaceae). These plants have root structures similar to members of Mandragora, and are likewise toxic.

Because these plants contain deliriant hallucinogenic tropane alkaloids and the shape of their roots often resembles human figures, they have been associated with magic rituals throughout history, including present-day contemporary pagan traditions.

== Nomenclature ==
The English name "mandrake" derives from Latin mandragora. While the classical name has nothing to do with either "man" or "dragon/drake", the English form made it susceptible to such folk etymology. The French form main-de-gloire ("hand of glory") has been held up as a "more complete example" of folk etymology (cf. § Main-de-gloire).

The German common name is Alraun, Alraune (cf. § Alraun below). However, the Latin mandragora, misidentified by false etymology to have a -draco ("dragon") stem (as manifests in the English form"mandrake", above) has caused the plant and beast to be conflated into an Alraundrachen, in the sense of a household spirit. This combined form is not well attested, but the house kobold is known regionally as either alraune[e] or drak (drak), (Note: This is a Low German form, but also borrowed in Switzerland, as noted by Doderer.) both classed as "dragon names" by Weiser-Aall (cf. § Alraun-drak).

The mandrake-doll in German might be called Alraun Männlein ("mandrake manikin"), in Belgian (Flemish) mandragora manneken, or in Italian mandragora maschio. In German, it is also known as Galgenmännlein ("little gallows man") stemming from the belief that they grow near gallows, also attested in Icelandic þjófarót "thieves' root".

Certain sources cite the Dutch name pisdiefje (lit. "little urine thief" (Note: Leyland gives 'little brain thief', which is not wrong, given "brain thief" is a term for mandrake, but pis is literally "piss, urine".)) or pisduiveltje ('urine devilkin'), claiming the plant grows from the brains of dead thieves, or the droppings of those hanged on the gallows. The name "brain thief" for mandrake also occurs in English.

== Toxicity and pharmaceutical use ==
All species of Mandragora contain highly biologically active alkaloids, particularly tropane alkaloids. The alkaloids make the plant poisonous—primarily the root and leaves—with anticholinergic, hallucinogenic, and hypnotic effects. Anticholinergic properties can lead to asphyxiation. People can be poisoned accidentally by ingesting mandrake root, which is likely to have other adverse effects, such as vomiting and diarrhea. The alkaloid concentration varies between plant samples. Clinical reports of the effects of consumption of Mediterranean mandrake include severe symptoms similar to those of atropine poisoning, including blurred vision, dilation of the pupils (mydriasis), dryness of the mouth, difficulty urinating, dizziness, headache, vomiting, blushing and a rapid heart rate (tachycardia). Hyperactivity and hallucinations occur in the majority of patients.

The root is hallucinogenic and narcotic. In sufficient quantities, it induces a state of unconsciousness and was used as an anaesthetic for surgery in ancient times. In the past, juice from the finely grated root was applied externally to relieve rheumatic pains. It was used internally to treat melancholy, convulsions, and mania. When taken internally in large doses, it was said to excite delirium and madness.

=== Ancient Greco-Roman pharmacopoeia ===
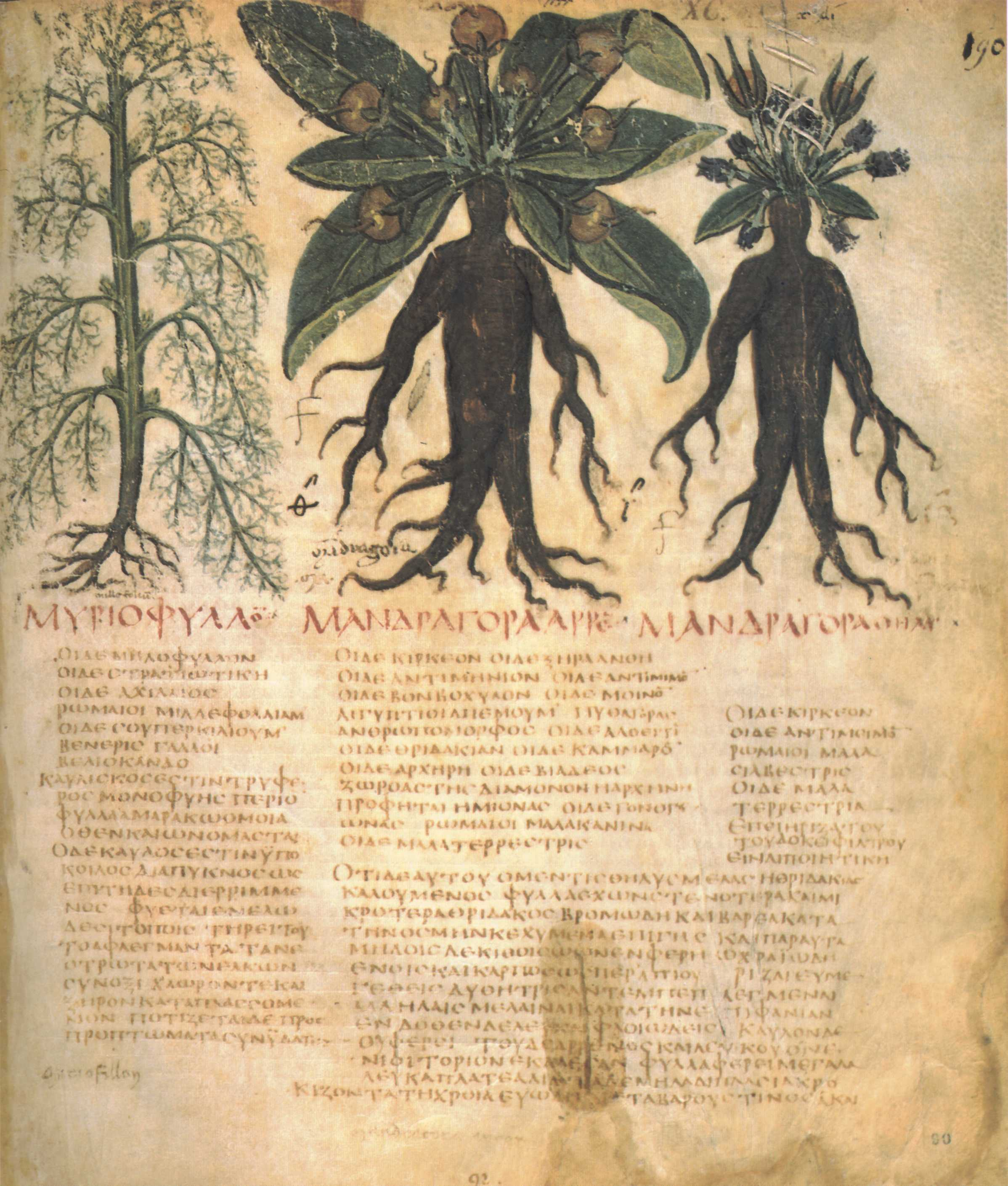
Mandrake illustration and text. Dioscorides De materia medica (7th-century manuscript, Biblioteca Nazionale, Naples).

Theophrastus (d. c. 287 BC), in Historia Plantarum, wrote that the mandragora needed to be harvested by following a prescribed ritual, namely, "draw three circles around [the root] with a sword, and cut it facing west"; Then in order to obtain a second piece, the harvester must dance around it while speaking as much lewd talk about sex as he possibly can. (Note: Theophrastus HN 9.8.8, "περιγράφειν δὲ καὶ τὸν μανδραγόραν εἰς τρὶς ξίφει..τὸν δ᾽ ἕτερον κύκλῳ περιορχεῖσθαι καὶ λέγειν ὡς πλεῖστα περὶ ἀφροδισίων", Hort renders it as "one should dance round the plant and say as many things as possible about the mysteries of love", whereas Preus gives it directly as "say as much as possible about sexual intercourse".) The ritual given in Pliny probably relies on Theophrastus.

Dioscorides, in De materia medica (1st century), described the uses of mandragora as a narcotic, analgesic, and abortifacient. He also claimed a love potion could be concocted from it.

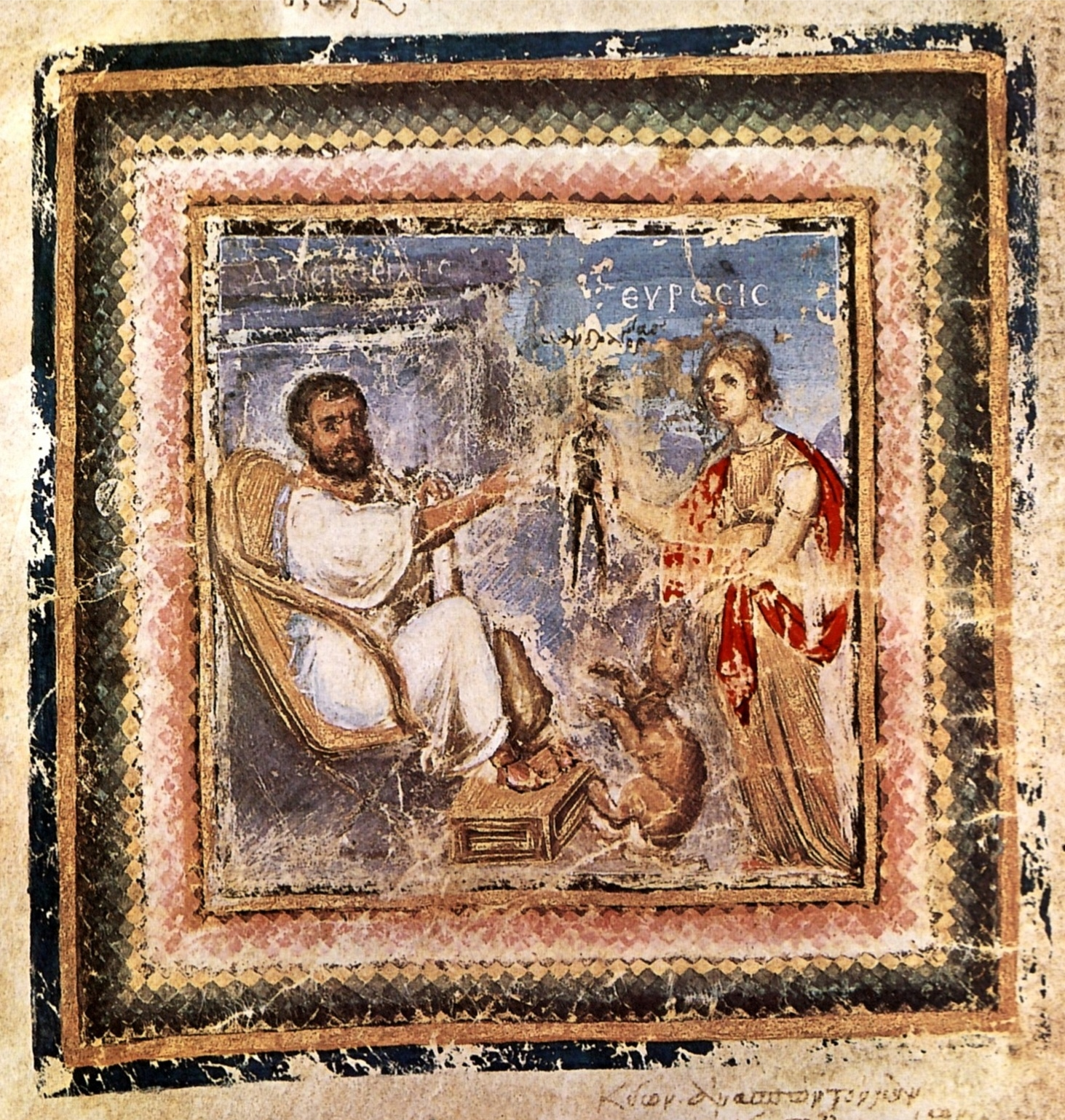
Euresis (Discovery) handing mandrake to Dioscorides. Note the tethered dog (Cf. Josephus). (Vienna ms., early 6th century).

Dioscorides, as a practicing physician, writes that some in his profession may administer a ladle or 1 cyathus (45 ml (1.5 US fl oz)) of mandrake reduction, made from the root boiled in wine until it shrivels to a third, before performing surgery. (Note: Disoscrides 1.571 gives "Some persons boil down the roots in wine to a third, strain it.. using one cyathus.. to [insominiacs or] persons about to be cut or cauterized". Though cast in third person, possibly "Dioscorides administered", himself, according to Finger.) Pliny the Elder also repeats that a 1-cyathus dose of mandragora potion is drunk (Note: The Latin text gives "bibitur" rendered "It is drunk.. before incisions and punctures" by Randolph, though the Bostock&Riley translation phrases it as "It is given".) by the patient before incisions or punctures are made on his body. (Note: Plinius Liber XXV. XCIII.) A simple juice (ὀπός) can be produced by mashing the root or scoring and leeching out, or a reduction type (χύλισμα, χυλός) made by boiling, for which Dioscorides provides distinguishing terms, though Pliny lumps these into "juice" (sucus). Just the stripped bark may be infused for a longer period, or the fruits can be sun-dried into a condensed juice, and so forth. The plant is supposedly strong-smelling. And its use for eye remedy is also noted.

Both authors acknowledge that there were male and female mandragoras. Pliny states there was the white male type and the dark female type of mandragora. However, he also has a different book-chapter on what he presumes to be a different plant called the white eryngium, also called centocapitum, which also are of two types: those resembling the male and female genitalia, which translators note might also be actually referring to the mandragora (of Genesis 30:14). (Note: Plinius Liber XXV. XCIII.) If a man came into possession of a phallic mandrake (eryngium), this had the power to attract women. Pliny contends that Phaon of Lesbos Island, by obtaining this phallic root, was able to cause the poet Sappho to fall in love with him.

A parallel has been noted between the lore of the mandrake harvested from a hangman, and the unguent which Medea gave to Iason, which was made from a plant fed with the body fluid from chain-bound Prometheus.

The ancient Greeks also burned mandrake as incense.

== Biblical ==
Two references to duḏāʾim (דּוּדָאִים "love plants"; singular: duḏā דודא) occur in the Jewish scriptures. The Septuagint translates דודאים as Koine Greek: μανδραγόρας, romanized: mandragóras, and the Vulgate follows the Septuagint. Several later translations into different languages follow Septuagint (and Vulgate) and use mandrake as the plant as the proper meaning in both the Genesis 30:14–16 and Song of Songs 7: 12-13. Others follow the example of the Luther Bible and provide a more literal translation. (Note: Sir Thomas Browne, in Pseudodoxia Epidemica, however, suggests the dudaʾim of Genesis 30:14 refers only to the opium poppy (as a metaphor describing a woman's breasts).)

=== Genesis ===
The dud̲āʾim was considered an aphrodisiac (Note: Hastings, "love philtre", citing Genesis 3:14–18) or rather a treatment for infertility, as in Genesis 30:14, which concerns the fertility of the wives of Jacob, who engendered the Twelve Tribes of Israel headed by his many children. Although he and Leah had a firstborn son Reuben, this marriage had been forced upon him through trickery, while his favorite wife, Rachel, Leah's younger sister, remained barren and coveted the dudaʾim. This plant was found by the boy Reuben, who supposedly entrusted it to Leah, who would barter it in exchange for allowing her to spend a night in Jacob's bed. (Note: And Reuben went in the days of wheat harvest, and found mandrakes in the field, and brought them unto his mother Leah. Then Rachel said to Leah, Give me, I pray thee, of thy son's mandrakes. And she said unto her, Is it a small matter that thou hast taken my husband? and wouldest thou take away my son's mandrakes also? And Rachel said, Therefore he shall lie with thee to night for thy son's mandrakes. And Jacob came out of the field in the evening, and Leah went out to meet him, and said, Thou must come in unto me; for surely I have hired thee with my son's mandrakes. And he lay with her that night. — the Bible, King James Version, Genesis 30:14–16)

However, the herbal treatment does not seem to work on Rachel, and instead, Leah, who had previously had four sons but had been infertile for a long while, became pregnant once more, so that in time, she gave birth to two more sons, Issachar and Zebulun, and a daughter, Dinah. Thus Rachel had to endure several more years of torment being childless, while her sister could flaunt her prolific motherhood, until God intervened, allowing for Rachel's conception of Joseph.

=== Song of Songs ===
The final verses of Chapter 7 of Song of Songs (verses 12–13), mention the plant once again:

נַשְׁכִּ֙ימָה֙ לַכְּרָמִ֔ים נִרְאֶ֞ה אִם פָּֽרְחָ֤ה הַגֶּ֙פֶן֙ פִּתַּ֣ח הַסְּמָדַ֔ר הֵנֵ֖צוּ הָרִמֹּונִ֑ים שָׁ֛ם אֶתֵּ֥ן אֶת־דֹּדַ֖י לָֽךְ׃ הַֽדּוּדָאִ֣ים נָֽתְנוּ-רֵ֗יחַ וְעַל-פְּתָחֵ֙ינוּ֙ כָּל-מְגָדִ֔ים חֲדָשִׁ֖ים גַּם-יְשָׁנִ֑ים דּוֹדִ֖י צָפַ֥נְתִּי לָֽךְ:

Let us get up early to the vineyards; let us see if the vine flourish, whether the tender grape appear, and the pomegranates bud forth: there will I give thee my loves. The mandrakes give a smell, and at our gates are all manner of pleasant fruits, new and old, which I have laid up for thee, O my beloved.

— the Bible, King James Version, Song of Songs 7:12–13

== Physiologus ==
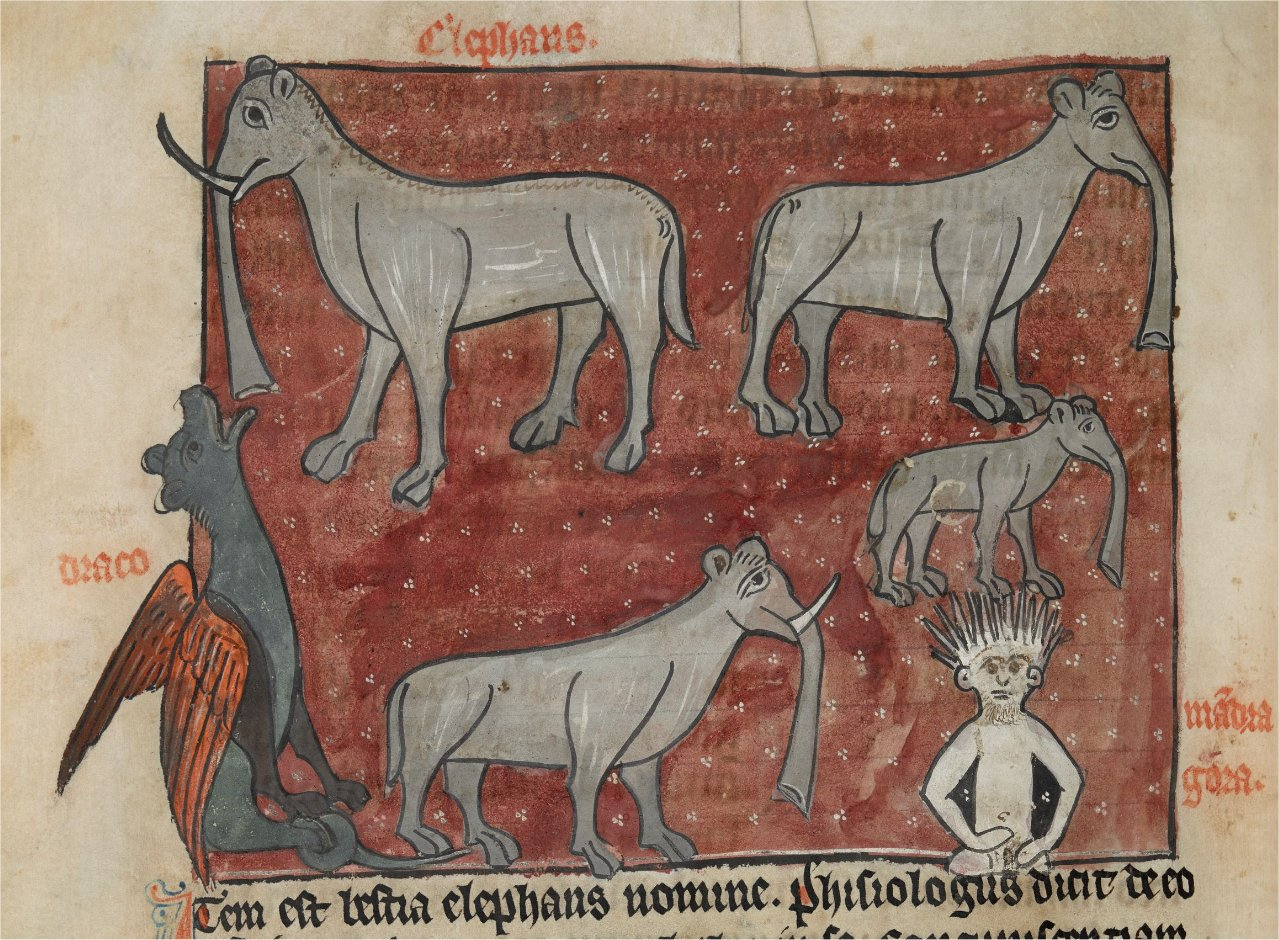
Elephants, mandrake, dragon (Bestiary, British Library, Sloane Ms. 178.)

In the Christian allegorical bestiary Physiologus, the chapter on the elephant claims that the male becomes minded to create an offspring, it leads its mate to the growing ground for the female to find the mandragora and come into estrous, the female then brings the root to the male which in turn become inflamed and they mate, making the female immediately pregnant. The elephants are illustrated in e.g., Sloane 278.

Philippe de Thaun's bestiary in Anglo-Norman verse has a chapter on the "mandragore", which states it consists of two kinds of roots, and must be extracted by the method of using a dog. He purports it to be a cure of all illnesses, save death.

== Josephus ==
Josephus (c. 37–100) of Jerusalem instructed on a method of using a dog as surrogate to uproot the dangerous herb used in exorcism. The herb has been equated to the mandragora in subsequent scholarship. According to Josephus, it was no easy task for the harvester, because it will move away from the hand which will grab it, and though it can be stopped by pouring a woman's urine or menstrual blood on it, touching it will cause certain death. Thus in order to safely obtain it:

A furrow must be dug around the root until its lower part is exposed, then a dog is tied to it, after which the person tying the dog must get away. The dog then endeavours to follow him, and so easily pulls up the root, but dies suddenly instead of his master. After this, the root can be handled without fear.

Here Josephus only refers to the plant as Baaras, after the place where it grows (in the valley Wadi Zarqa covering the north side of Machaerus, (Note: Macherus, Machärus) in present-day Jordan), and thinks the plant is a type of rue (of the citrus family) however, it is considered to be identifiable as mandrake based on textual comparisons (cf. § Alraun).

== Folklore ==
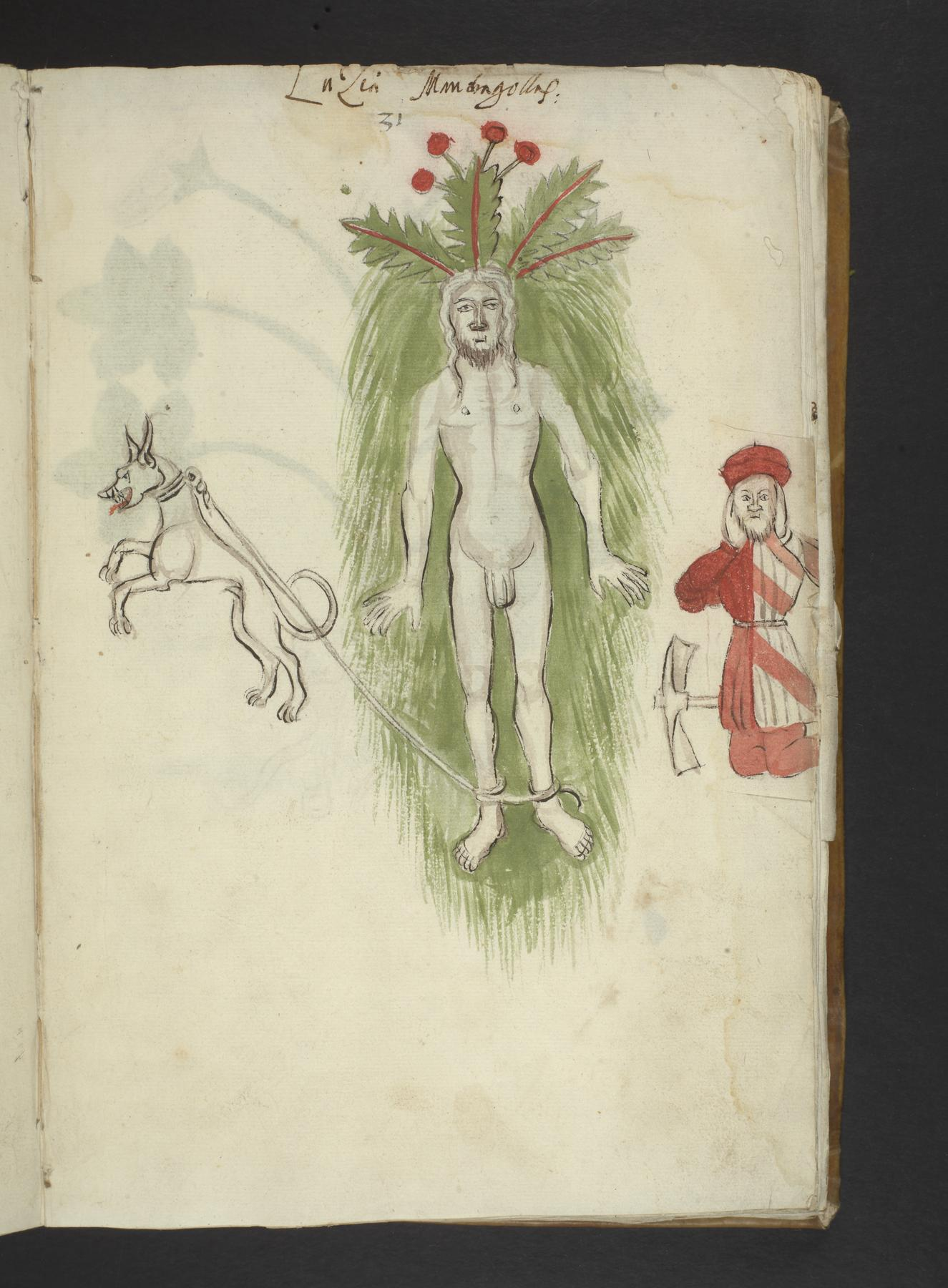
fol. 16r from University of Pennsylvania LJS 46: Herbal ... etc., from Italy and England, dated to ca. 1520

In the past, mandrake was often made into amulets which were believed to bring good fortune, cure sterility, etc. In one superstition, people who pull up this root will be condemned to hell, and the mandrake root would scream and cry as it was pulled from the ground, killing anyone who heard it. Therefore, in the past, people have tied the roots to the bodies of animals and then used these animals to pull the roots from the soil.

=== Magic and witchcraft ===
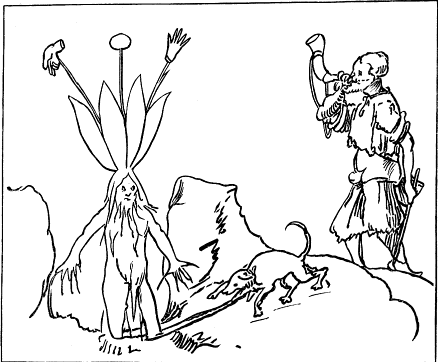
Medieval depiction of mandrake excavation with dog (Medieval. Germanisches Museum, Nuremberg. Sketched by Edmund Oskar Lippmann, 1894)

According to the European folklore (including England), when the root is dug up, it screams and kills all who hear it, so a dog must be attached to the root and made to pull it out. This piece of lore goes back centuries to Josephus's described method of sacrificing the dog to procure his baaras.

It was a medieval embellishment that the root shrieked when extracted, and so was the lore that mandrake grew from the spots where criminals spilled their fluids. Neither of these were registered by the ancient Greek or Latin authors. (Note: Pliny (or Josephus), and Theophrastus.) The mandrake is represented as shining at night like a lantern, in the Old English Herbarium (c. 1000).

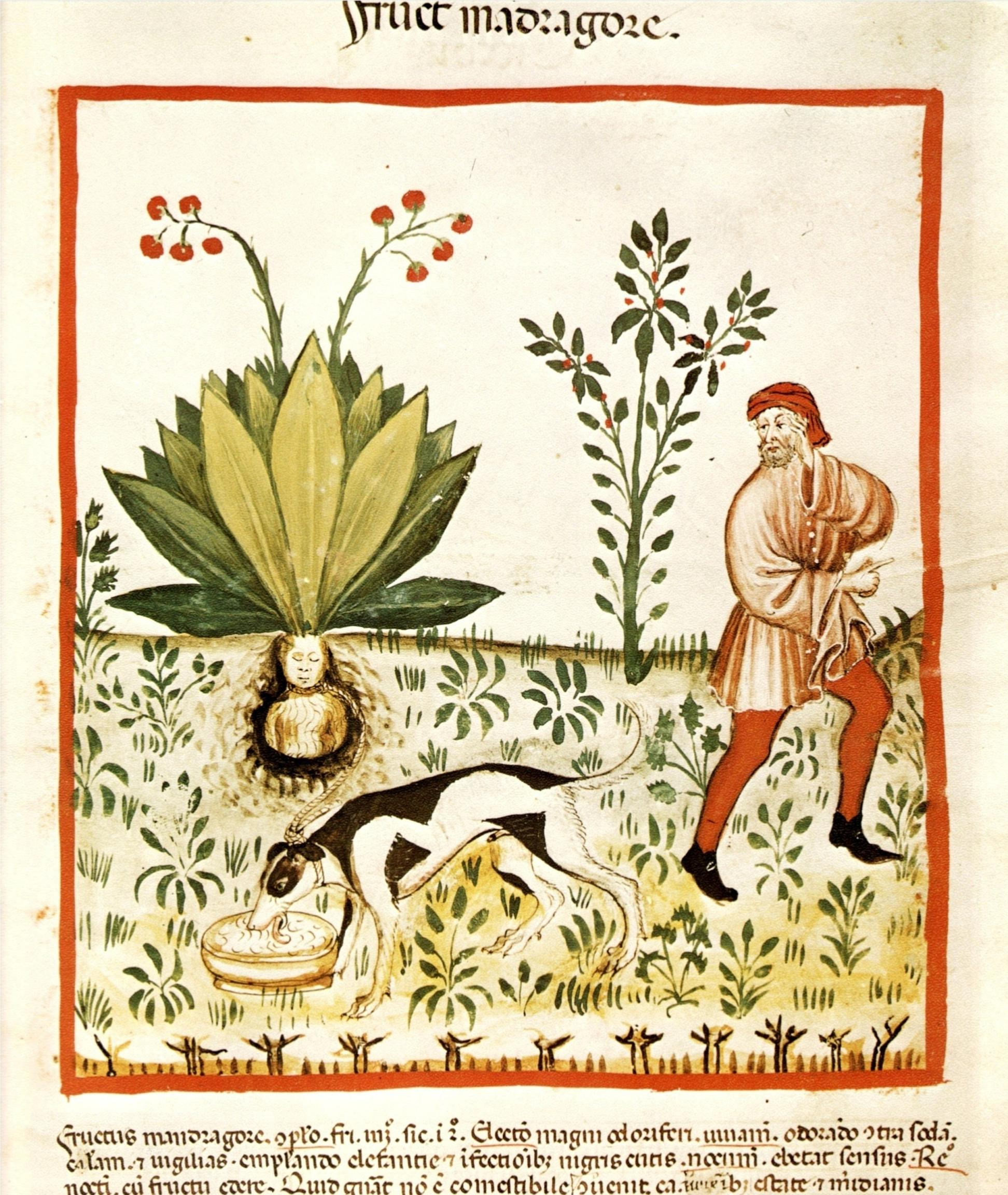
Mandragora tied to a dog, from Tacuinum Sanitatis (Codex Vindobonensis Series nova 2644, fol. 40r. c. 1390. Austrian National Library, Wien (Note: Workshop of N. Italy (Verona, Italy). While this late 14th century copy features a black and white dog, a white dog is shown in the mid-15th century BnF (Paris) copy (ms. Latin 9333, fol. 37r) made in Rhineland, Germany presumably from an Italian original.))

In medieval times, mandrake was considered a key ingredient in a multitude of witches' flying ointment recipes as well as a primary component of magical potions and brews. These were entheogenic preparations used in European witchcraft for their mind-altering and hallucinogenic effects. Starting in the Late Middle Ages and thereafter, some believed that witches applied these ointments or ingested these potions to help them fly to gatherings with other witches, meet with the Devil, or to experience bacchanalian carousal.

Romani people use mandrake as a love-amulet.

=== Alraun ===
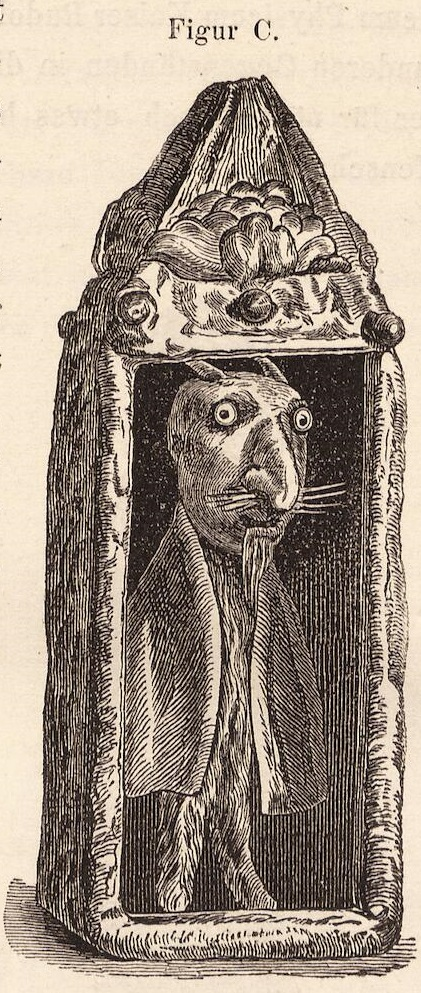
Alraun in its case (formerly owned by Karl Lemann, Wien; now in the Germanisches Nationalmuseum collection, Nürnberg)

The German name for mandrake is Alraun, or female case Alraune as already stated, from MHG alrûne, OHG alrûn (alruna). (Note: The form alruna is also attested in the Glossaria Augiensia of Reichenau Abbey, 13th cent., ed. Mone, cited by Grimm DM, Anmerkungen.) The name has been connected to the female personal name OHG Al(b)rûn, Old English Ælfrūn, Old Norse Alfrún, composed of elements Alb/Alp 'elf, dream demon' + raunen "to whisper"; a more persuasive, though not clinching, explanation is that it derives from *ala- 'all' + *rūnō 'secret' hence "great secret". Grimm explains that it passed from the original meaning of a prophetess type of evil-spirit (or wise woman), into the mandrake or plant-root charm.

The form allerünren (or allerünken) is attested as the Dithmarschen dialect for standard diminutive alrünchen, and in the narrative, the doll is carefully locked in a box, since touching it will impart a power to multiply the dough many times over.

The alraune doll was also known by names such as glücksmännchen and galgenmännlein. The doll, according to superstition, worked like a charm, bringing its owner luck and fortune. The glücks-männchen might be a wax doll "ridiculously dressed up". There is also the mönöloke, a wax doll dressed up in the name of the devil, which is considered a parallel or variant of the alrun doll.

Because true mandrake does not grow native in Germany, Alrun dolls were being made from cane-roots or false mandrake (German: Gichtrübe; Bryonia alba of the gourd family), recorded in the herbal book by the Italian Pietro Andrea Mattioli (d. 1577/78). The roots are cut approximately to human-like shape, then replanted in the ground for some time. If hair is desired, the root is pockmarked using a sharpened dowel and millet grains pushed into the holes, and replanted until something like a head of hair grows. (Note: Mattioli's herbal tome, Book 4, Chapter 21, cited by Praetorius (1663), p. 158.) (Note: Mattioli (1563), Das Vierdte Buch von der Kreuter, "Vom Alraun Cap. LXXV", requoted by Marzell.) (Note: Gichtrube answers to Bryonia alba, and while the latter quote from Mattioli stating "Brionienwurtz" may seem ambiguous as to species, Mattioli elsewhere describes the type that grows in Hungary and Germany to be black-berried (not red), which is sufficient as identifier.) (Note: Praetorius in his Anthropodemus: Neue Welt-Beschreibung, Volume 2 gives a different German name,schwarz Stickwurgel. Mattioli lists the German names Stickwurtz, Teufelskürbtz (latter prob. "devil gourd") in his Latin treatise entry for this plant. The present-day common name in German seems to be Weiße Zaunrübe.)

The root or rhizome of an iris, gentian or tormentil (Blutwurz) was also purposed for making Alraun dolls. Even the alpine leek (German: Allermannsharnisch; Allium victorialis) was used. The doll formerly owned by Karl Lemann of Wien (cf. fig. right; purchased by Germanisches Nationalmuseum in 1876 where it now remains) had been appraised in the past as having the head made of bryony root, and the body of an alpine leek.

A pair of vintage alraune kept in the Austrian imperial and royal (now national) library, described as being untampered naturally grown roots, belonged to Holy Roman Emperor Rudolf II (d. 1612).

German sources repeat the recipe of harvesting the mandrake (Alraun) by sacrificing a dog, but demand a "black dog" should be used. (Note: Mattioli, op. cit.) (Note: Andreas Libavius Singularium Pars II (1599), under "Exercitatio de agno vegetabili Scythiae" (Vegetable Lamb of Tartary)、p, 313.) (Note: Either black or a black and white dog, according to some sources (cf. illustration in the Wien copy of Tacuinum Sanitatis, below).) This has passed into German literature, (Note: Grimmelshausen (1673), Galgen-Männlein, p. 4 notes that Alraun requires a black dog, just like Josephus prescribes for extracting Baraas [sic], then elaborates on Josephus's method in the Annotatio.) (Note: Praetorius (1663) Saturnalia ("Saturnalia: That Is, A Company of Christmastide Antics"), pp. 166–167 also cite Josephus, The Jewish War Book 7, Ch. 25 and explain the procedure for unrooting the Baaras (correct spelling).) (Note: Praetorius's Anthropodemus: Neue Welt-beschreibung volume 1, ch. 5 on "Plant-people" discusses the alraun and black dog, but Grimm's citation only includes volume 2, ch. 8 on the "Wood-man", with some bits of information.) and into folklore, as compiled by the Brothers Grimm in Deutsche Sagen, No. 83 "Der Alraun". (Note: Grimms' DS No. 83, redacted in Grimm DM 4te Ausgabe, Band II, Kap. XXXVII) The Grimm version has the black dog tied by the tail, but this is not a constant reflected in all the sources, nor does it match the illustrated depictions show above.

German folklore assigns the alias name Galgenmännlein ("little man of the gallows") to the mandrake, based on the belief the plant springs from the ground beneath a hanged man where his urine or semen had dripped into ground. A more elaborate set of conditions had to be met by the hanged man to produce the magic herb in version given by the Grimms' Deutsche Sagen, which essentially amalgamates the formulae from two of its sources.

According to one source, if a hanged man was a hereditary thief (Erbdieb), his mother had either stolen or contemplated stealing while carrying him, and he died a virgin, then the fluids that dripped down would cause a "Galgn-Mänl" to grow there (Grimmelshausen alias Simplicissimus's Galgen-Männlein, 1673). It later states that the plant is the product of combining the arch-thief's (Erzdieb) soul with his semen or urine. (Note: The Grimms cite Simplicissimus Galgen-Männlein. It is generally known Simplicissimus was a pseudo-author/character invented by Grimmelshausen. The work's title also mentions as informant or co-author an "Israel Fromschmidt [von Hugenfelss]" (Grimms' Fron- is a typo), but this personage is also an anagram pseudonym of Grimmelshausen. The date of authorship was solved from a chronogram as 1673.) The other source states that when an innocent man who was hanged as a thief released "water" from the pain and torture he endured, a plant with plantain-like (Note: German: Wegerich.) leaves grew from that spot. Collecting it requires only that the harvest take place on a Friday before dawn; the collector must stuff his ears with cotton, seal them with wax or pitch, and make the sign of the cross three times while harvesting (Johannes Praetorius, Saturnalia, 1663).

The acquired alraun root needs to be washed with red wine, wrapped in red and white silk cloth, and deposited in its own case; it must be removed every Friday to be bathed, and a new white shirt must be given to it every new moon, according to the Grimms' collated version, though sources vary on the details. (Note: Mattioli: washed with wine and water all Saturday long; Grimmelshausen (1673), p. 4: wash with red wine, wrap in soft linen or silk, and bathe every Friday. Praetorius Saturnalia: wrap in white and red silk, encased, and prayed to.)

If questions are posed to the alraun doll, it will reveal the future or secrets, according to superstition. In this way, the owner becomes wealthy. If a coin is placed on it, the doll can literally double small amounts of money each night. It must not be overdone, or the alraun will be tapped of its strength and may die. (Note: Grimm, after Grimmelshausen (1673), p. 3 provides the monetary limits. A ducat (gold coin) will rarely succeed in doubling, and if the owner wants the doll to endure, a half thaler (silver coin) would be about the limit.) It is also said that the owner is able to befriend everybody, and, if childless, will be blessed with children. (Note: Mattioli also remarks that the barren will become fertile.)

When the owner dies, the youngest son inherits ownership of the doll. A piece of bread and a coin must be placed in the father's coffin. If the youngest son predeceases the father, the right of inheritance passes to the eldest son, but the deceased youngest son must still receive his coin and bread in his coffin.

==== Alraun-drak ====
The household kobold is known regionally as Alraun[e] or Drak, sharing the same etymological relationship. (Note: Classification "I Drachennamen".) The name drak descends not from the Latin draco ('dragon') but from mandragora; however, folklore concerning fiery dragons later became conflated with the concept of the house sprite, according to Heimito von Doderer (see also § Nomenclature) Doderer provides commentary that "field dragons" (Tatzelwurm) and mandrake fused with the folklore of the house kobold.

Heinrich Marzell's entry in the HdA ventures that the alraun depicted as a flying creature laying golden eggs is in fact a dragon. In two Swiss examples, however, the animal is either unidentified—such as the Alräunchen said to live in the woods at the foot of Hochwang near Chur, or the alrune is described as a red-crested bird rumored to generate a thaler coin each day for its owner. (Note: Note that Polívka in his paper on the lore of kobolds born from an egg (much of it from Pommerania, now straddling Germany and Poland) makes connection to Wendian lore about a black hen hatching dragon (p. 55) similar to the well-known lore on the basilisk (passim), also noting that the Alraunmanchenn is the agent performing the luck- or gold-bringing task for the owner.)

=== Main-de-gloire ===
In France, there is also the tradition that the main-de-gloire (mandrake) is harvested from under a gibbet.

Testimony collected firsthand by Sainte-Palaye (d. 1781) details a peasant's claim to have kept a main-de-gloire found at the base of a mistletoe-bearing oak. The creature was said to be a type of mole. It had to be fed regularly with meat, bread, etc., or suffer dire consequences (two who failed suffered death). In return, whatever was given to the main-de-gloire was restored the next day at double its value (even an écu coin), thus enriching its keeper. (Note: The ultimate source (which work or document by Palaye) is not clarified, and Rendel Harris quotes Palaye in French out of Pierre Adolphe Chéruel (1855) Dictionnaire historique.)

=== 19th-century esoterica ===
An excerpt from Transcendental Magic: Its Doctrine and Ritual by nineteenth-century clergyman, occultist, and ceremonial magician Éliphas Lévi, suggests the plant might hint at mankind's "terrestrial origin:"

The natural mandragore is a filamentous root which, more or less, presents as a whole either the figure of a man, or that of the virile members. It is slightly narcotic, and an aphrodisiacal virtue was ascribed to it by the ancients, who represented it as being sought by Thessalian sorcerers for the composition of philtres. Is this root the umbilical vestige of our terrestrial origin? We dare not seriously affirm it, but all the same it is certain that man came out of the slime of the earth, and his first appearance must have been in the form of a rough sketch. The analogies of nature make this notion necessarily admissible, at least as a possibility. The first men were, in this case, a family of gigantic, sensitive mandragores, animated by the sun, who rooted themselves up from the earth; this assumption not only does not exclude, but, on the contrary, positively supposes, creative will and the providential co-operation of a first cause, which we have REASON to call GOD. Some alchemists, impressed by this idea, speculated on the culture of the mandragore, and experimented in the artificial reproduction of a soil sufficiently fruitful and a sun sufficiently active to humanise the said root, and thus create men without the concurrence of the female. Others, who regarded humanity as the synthesis of animals, despaired about vitalising the mandragore, but they crossed monstrous pairs and projected human seed into animal earth, only for the production of shameful crimes and barren deformities.

The following is taken from Jean-Baptiste Pitois's The History and Practice of Magic (1870), and explains a ritual for creating a mandrake:

Would you like to make a Mandragora, as powerful as the homunculus (little man in a bottle) so praised by Paracelsus? Then find a root of the plant called bryony. Take it out of the ground on a Monday (the day of the moon), a little time after the vernal equinox. Cut off the ends of the root and bury it at night in some country churchyard in a dead man's grave. For 30 days, water it with cow's milk in which three bats have been drowned. When the 31st day arrives, take out the root in the middle of the night and dry it in an oven heated with branches of verbena; then wrap it up in a piece of a dead man's winding-sheet and carry it with you everywhere.

== See also ==
- Ginseng – Root of a plant used in herbal preparations (name comes from "human" shape)
- The Spirit in the Bottle – German fairy tale

== Bibliography ==
- Druce, George C (1919). "The Mediæval Bestiaries, and Their Influence on Ecclesiastical Decorative Art". Journal of the British Archaeological Association. 25 (1): 41–82. doi:10.1080/00681288.1919.11894541.
- Grimmelshausen, Jacob Christoffel von (pseudonyms: Simplicissmus, Israël Fromschmidt von Hugenfeltß) (1673). Simplicissimi Galgen-Männlin.
- Harris, J. Rendel (1917). Guppy, Henry (Librarian of John Rylands Library) (ed.). "The Origin of the Cult of Aphrodite". Bulletin of the John Rylands Library. 3 (4). Manchester University Press: 354–381. doi:10.7227/BJRL.3.4.2.
- Müllenhoff, Karl, ed. (1845). Sagen, Märchen und Lieder der Herzogthümer Schleswig Holstein und Lauenburg. Schwerssche Buchhandlung.
  - ——(1899). Reprint. Siegen: Westdeutschen Verlagsanstalt
- Randolph, Charles Brewster (1905). "Mandragora in Folk-lore and Medicine". Daedalus: Journal of the American Academy of Arts and Sciences. 40. MIT Press: 87–587.
- Schlosser, Alfred (1912). Die Sage vom Galgenmännlein im Volksglauben und in der Literatur (Ph. D.). Münster in Westfalen: Druck der Theissingschen buchhandlung.
- Simoons, Frederick J. (1998). "Chapter 4. Mandrake, a Root Human in Form". Plants of Life, Plants of Death, Frederick J. Simoons. Univ of Wisconsin Press. pp. 101–135. ISBN 9780299159047.
- Steinmeyer, Elias; Sievers, Eduard, eds. (1895). Die althochdeutschen Glossen. Vol. 3. Berlin: Weidmann.
