= The Fatal Marksman =

1810 short story by Johann August Apel

- Short story by Johann August Apel
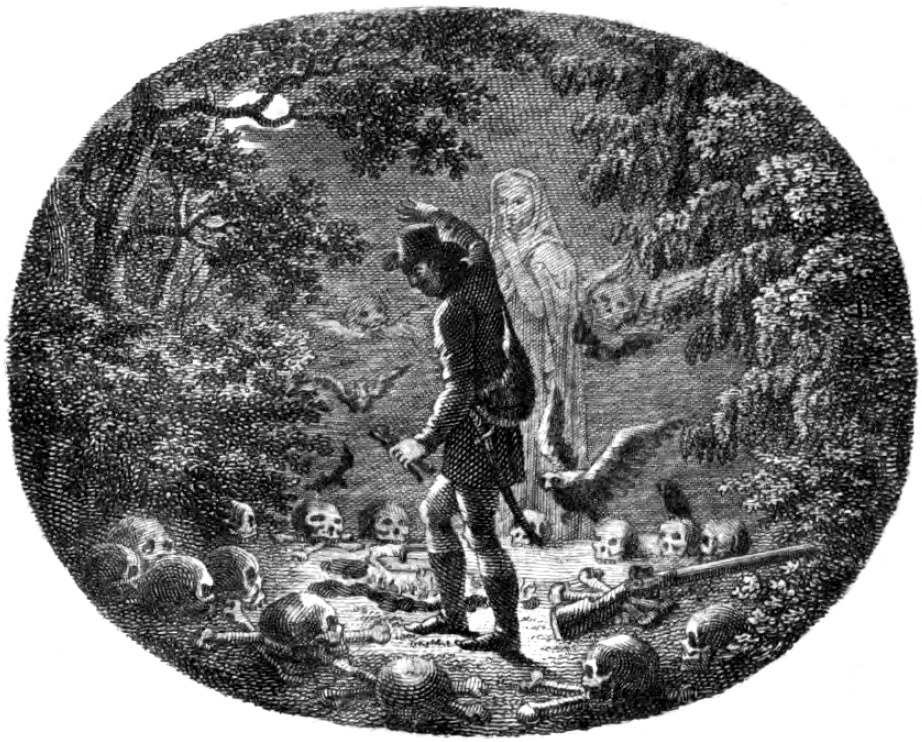
- Engraved scene from "The Fatal Marksman" in the Gespensterbuch
- Original title: Der Freischütz
- Translator: Thomas De Quincey
- Country: Saxony
- Language: German

Publication
- Published in: Gespensterbuch
- Publication date: 1810
- Published in English: 1823
- Pages: 43

"The Fatal Marksman" (German: Der Freischütz. Eine Volkssage, lit. 'The Freeshooter: A Popular Tale') is an 1810 short story by the German writer Johann August Apel.

== Background ==
Johann Georg Theodor Grässe identified the main source as a similar story in Otto von Graben zum Stein's 1730 book Monatliche Unterredungen aus dem Reich der Geister (lit. 'Monthly Conversations from the Realm of Spirits'), of which Apel's collaborator Friedrich Laun owned a copy.

== Plot ==
The clerk Wilhelm is in love with Käthchen, who is the daughter of the forester Bertram in Lindenhayn. Bertram thinks Wilhelm is unsuitable for forestry and prefers the hunter Robert as a prospective husband for Käthchen. Desperate to prove himself worthy as a hunter, Wilhelm makes a deal with the Devil to cast magic bullets that never miss their targets.

== Publication ==
"The Fatal Marksman" was published in 1810 in the first volume of Apel's and Laun's short-story collection Gespensterbuch. The story was published in its own volume by Ernst Fleischer in Leipzig in 1823. It first appeared in English as "The Fatal Marksman" in the 1823 collection Popular Tales and Romances of the Northern Nations, where it was translated by Thomas De Quincey. Several English translation under a variety of titles followed in the 19th century.

== Adaptations ==
Franz Xaver von Caspar wrote a play based on "The Fatal Marksman" in 1812. Apel's story was the basis for the 1821 opera Der Freischütz composed by Carl Maria von Weber to a libretto by Johann Friedrich Kind. For the opera adaptation, several characters were merged or modified, and the story was changed to have a happy ending.

Robert Wilson, Tom Waits and William S. Burroughs adapted the story into The Black Rider: The Casting of the Magic Bullets, which was described as a "cosmic vaudeville show" and premiered in Hamburg in 1990.

== See also ==
- Freischütz
