= Freischütz =

Marksman in German folklore

In German folklore, the figure of the Freischütz (German: [ˈfʁaɪʃʏts]) is a marksman who, by a contract with the devil, has obtained a certain number of bullets destined to hit without fail whatever object he wishes. As the legend is usually told, six of the magic bullets (German: Freikugeln [ˈfʁaɪˌkuːɡl̩n]) are thus subservient to the marksman's will, but the seventh is at the absolute disposal of the devil himself.

== Etymology ==
Freischütz is a German compound word, consisting of frei ('free') and Schütz ('shooter' or 'rifleman'). There are several theories that try to explain why the word frei is used. One is that it has a military origin, perhaps from terms like Freikorps (independent 'free-corps' regiments), or the French franc-archer ('free-archer'). Another suggests a supernatural element, with frei having a sense of magic or enchantment, or that the bullet is destined by fate or the devil. It could even mean the acquisition of secret knowledge or skill, similarly to masters of other "free mathematical arts", such as stonemasons, painters, carvers, goldsmiths, and architects.

== Early folktales ==
The Freischütz folktales can be traced back to similar stories of magical arrows. The first known historical account is found in Heinrich Kramer's Malleus Maleficarum (1487), of an archer found standing paralysed near Hohenzollern Castle at a bleeding wayside crucifix, which he had shot with the belief that he would get four arrows, three of which he could guide at will. In 1529, Landsknecht Melchior Hauser is said to have found a monk in Hungary who used three or four such arrows each day.

The earliest known use of the term Freischütz is from the 1586 trial at Rostock of Hans Cröpelin and Cersten Sasse, two hunters accused of attempting to forge Freikugeln bullets by arcane means. In early accounts, Freikugeln are generally either made by shooting at a holy target (such as a crucifix, an image of Christ, or the Host), or casting the bullets at night, often at a crossroads, sometimes using lead stolen from a church, poured through the eyes of the skull of a woman who died during childbirth, or using powders made from unpleasant recipes. This often happens on St. Abdon's day (30 July) or Midsummer's Day. According to the stories, not only can the bullets be guided at will, but can also hit a named target miles away, even the devil himself. Some tales attribute other powers to the bullets, such as in one case transforming a cat in a chimney into a hare. However, whoever uses these bullets is shunned, and cannot enter churches. They generally meet an unpleasant end, sometimes with a bullet turned on them by the devil, and risk returning as a ghost cursed to hunt for eternity.

== Georg Schmid ==
According to Otto von Graben zum Stein's Unterredung von dem Reiche der Geister ('Conversations from the Spirit-World') (1731), court records from a town in Bohemia in 1710 tell the story of Georg Schmid. Schmid, a young clerk who enjoyed target shooting, asked a hunter for advice. The hunter convinced Schmid to join him in casting bullets on the night of St. Abdon's day, sixty of which would always hit their target, but three, indistinguishable from the rest, would always miss. On the evening of St. Abdon's day, they went to a crossroads; the hunter drew a circle with strange characters around the edge using his Weide-Messer, and told Schmid to remove his clothes and deny God and the Trinity. They began to cast the bullets at eleven o'clock, and had to complete the task by midnight, or their souls would belong to the devil. During this time, many phantoms tried to distract them, but when their task was complete, a rider on a black horse appeared and demanded the bullets. The hunter refused, so the rider threw something onto the fire, which caused a stench that made them lose consciousness. When the hunter recovered, he took the bullets, went to the nearest village and told them Schmid was at the crossroads, then left for the Salzburg mountains. Schmid was found and carried to the nearest town, where he was interrogated. He made a full confession, and was sentenced to death by sword, then burning, but as he was only about eighteen years old this was commuted to six years' imprisonment with hard labour.

== Apel's Freischütz ==
The Freischütz tale became widely circulated in 1810 when Johann August Apel included "The Fatal Marksman" as the first tale in the first volume of the Gespensterbuch ('Book of Ghosts'). Friedrich Laun, co-author of the Gespensterbuch, owned a copy of Unterredung von dem Reiche der Geister (1731), and Johann Georg Theodor Grässe theorised that he brought the story of Georg Schmid to the attention of Apel.

In Apel's version of the story, a forester, Bertram, is the last male descendant of the hunter Kuno. He wants his daughter, Käthchen, to marry a hunter and continue his line. Käthchen loves a clerk called Wilhelm, who convinces Bertram of his skill as a huntsman; the couple get engaged and Wilhelm prepares for his test to become a forester. However, from the day of their engagement, Wilhelm is cursed, and begins to miss almost every shot. Wilhelm meets an old soldier with a wooden leg, who gives him a handful of magic bullets that always hit, but when the bullets run out, Wilhelm cannot find the old soldier to get more. After hearing Bertram tell the story of Georg Schmid, Wilhelm casts his own magic bullets on the night before the test, sixty of which will always hit, and three that belong to the devil. Wilhelm passes the test flawlessly, except for the final shot, which hits Käthchen, killing her, and driving Wilhelm insane.

== Hoffmann's The Devil's Elixirs ==
E. T. A. Hoffmann's The Devil's Elixirs (1815–1816) includes a gamekeeper who claims to have a feud with "Freischützen" (sometimes translated as 'devil's marksmen'), who he says often try to kill him but are unable to due to his faith. When the gamekeeper's apprentice, Franz, fails to shoot what he thinks is the devil (actually the wild Capuchin friar Medardus), a rumour begins that the devil had approached Franz and offered him magic bullets.

== Weber's opera ==
Apel's tale formed the subject of Weber's opera Der Freischütz (1821), the libretto of which was written by Johann Friedrich Kind, who had suggested Apel's story as an excellent theme for the composer.

In this version, an assistant forester, Max, fears failing a shooting trial which would allow him to marry the forester Kuno's daughter Agathe, and become the new forester. Kaspar, another assistant forester, who was rejected by Agathe, seeks revenge by convincing Max to join him in casting seven magic bullets – six of which will always hit, with the seventh guided by the devil. Max completes the trial, using all except one of his bullets, but when the sovereign prince, who is overseeing the trial, commands Max to shoot at a dove, the bullet instead hits Agathe. However, a wreath blessed by a hermit deflects the bullet, which kills Kaspar instead. The prince threatens to banish Max, until the hermit intercedes, and Max is granted a probationary year, after which he will be allowed to remain and marry Agathe.

== Pitois' Spectre Fiancé ==
"Le Spectre Fiancé" in Jean-Baptiste Pitois' Contes nocturnes (1846), attributed to E. T. A. Hoffmann, begins with a translation of Apel's "Der Freischütz", but continues the story after the death of Wilhelm's fiancée Catherine. Wilhelm marries another woman the following year, despite having sworn an oath to remain unmarried for the rest of his life. Driven by remorse, Wilhelm takes a solitary excursion through hills, dales, plains, and forests. As he rides, he hears the wild huntsman, his pack, and wild beasts chasing after him, and lightning strikes Wilhelm's horse. A mysterious voice commands Wilhelm to follow and leads him to a cavern, where Wilhelm sees many skeletons, one of which is that of Catherine. Catherine's skeleton waltzes with Wilhelm back to a forest clearing, and other skeletons join the dance until daybreak. The following morning Wilhelm is found dead with white rose leaves strewn around him, and his horse nearby being eaten by wolves.

== Slovene version ==
Similar tales are also known from Slavic mythology, where the marksman, named Lampret, is sometimes called čarostřelec ('warlock marksman').

== Leo Perutz ==
Leo Perutz' debut novel Die dritte Kugel ('The Third Bullet') (1915) revolves around a variation of the Freischütz motif in which all of the supernatural bullets serve the devil's revenge: The German Duke Grumbach, who has been forced into Mexican exile during the European wars of religion, is drawn into the Spanish conquest of the Aztec Empire and, siding with Moctezuma II against the cruel Hernán Cortés, out of desperation makes a deal with the devil to win an Arquebus in a game of dice from a Spanish soldier because the Aztec side is unable to compete with the Spanish firearms. However, the gun's former owner curses its remaining three bullets when facing execution for losing it: one is to hit Grumbach's king, one to hit his lover, and the last to hit Grumbach himself. The curse comes true when Grumbach uses the first bullet to shoot Moctezuman in order to enrage the Aztec to kill the Spanish in a mass uprising, and when his servant Melchior accidentally shoots Grumbach's lover Dalila with the second bullet during an attempt to assassinate Cortés' right hand man. The fate of the third bullet remains unclear: The first person narrator of the novel's Frame story appears to be an old, mentally unwell Grumbach, still accompanied by the now-mute Melchior, serving his former enemies back in Germany as a mercenary and apparently suffering from amnesia due to the traumatic events of which he can only grasp fleeting memories. During the novel's prelude, he comes across an old Spanish rider telling the story of Grumbach and his legendary three cursed bullets, and remembers his identity. At this moment, the novel shifts to its main body, the actual story of Grumbach as narrated by the Spanish rider until the point of Grumbach chasing Cortés to shoot him with the last bullet. At this moment the rider is apparently interrupted by Melchior, who kills him. The novel shifts back into its frame narrative, whose narrator has realized he is Grumbach, but his memory quickly fades and he sinks back into forgetfulness because Melchior has shot the rider with what is suggested to have been the third bullet before he was able to finish Grumbach's story, which would have fully restored Grumbach's memory.
