= Gespensterbuch =

Collection of German ghost stories

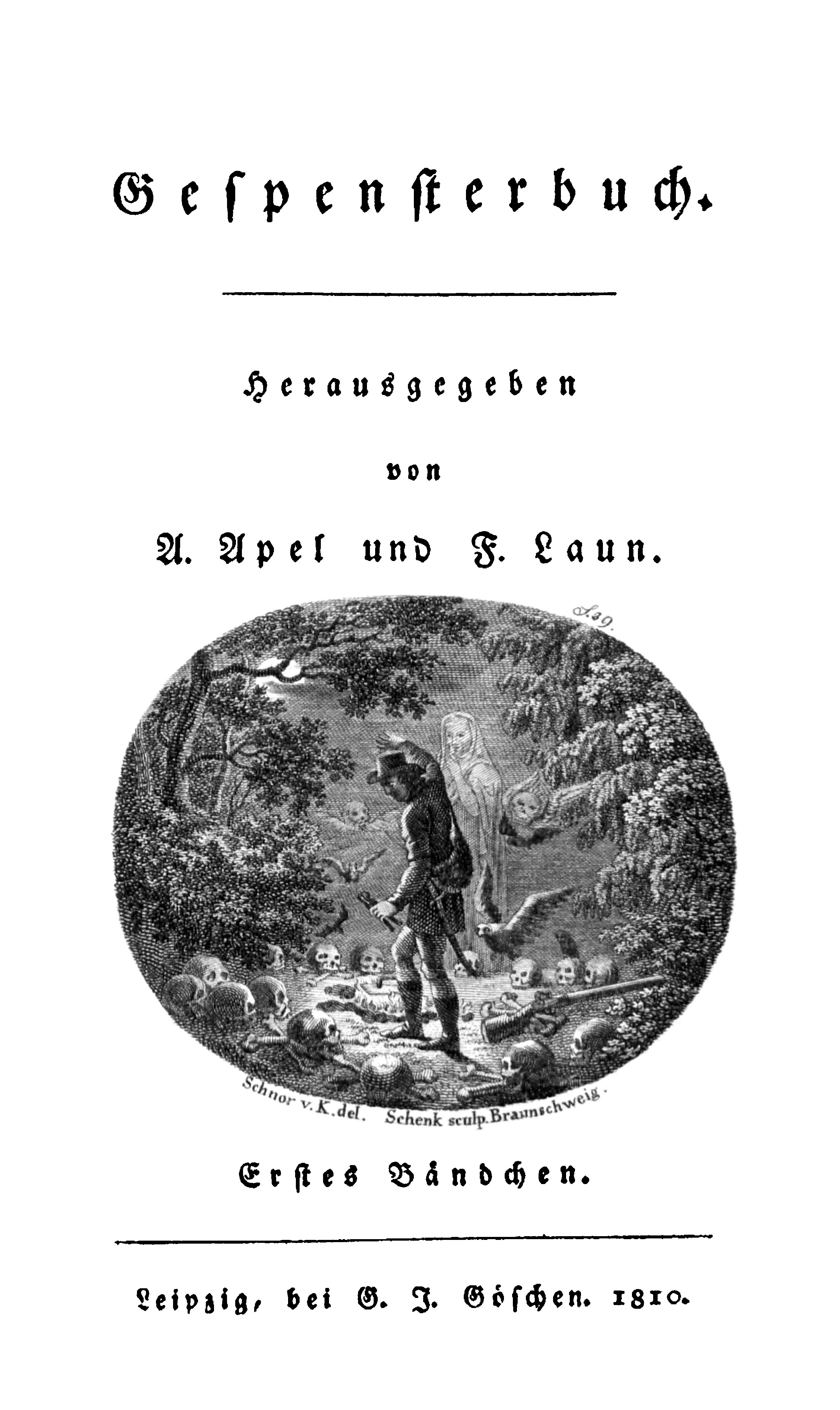
- First edition, volume 1 title page with an engraving depicting "Der Freischütz"
- Author: Johann August Apel, Friedrich Laun, Friedrich de la Motte Fouqué, Carl Borromäus von Miltitz
- Country: Kingdom of Saxony
- Language: German
- Genre: Gothic fiction
- Publisher: G. J. Göschen
- Published: 1810–1817
- Media type: Print
- No. of books: 7
- OCLC: 43030162
- Followed by: Wunderbuch (vols. 5–7); Aus der Geisterwelt

The Gespensterbuch (literally 'Ghost Book' or 'Book of Spectres') is a collection of German ghost stories written by August Apel and Friedrich Laun and published in seven volumes between 1810 and 1817. Volumes five to seven were also published under the title Wunderbuch ('Book of Wonders'). The final volume was published after Apel's death, with stories by his friends Friedrich de la Motte Fouqué and Carl Borromäus von Miltitz. Laun, Fouqué, Miltitz, and Caroline de la Motte Fouqué followed up on the series by publishing another book of ghost stories Aus der Geisterwelt ('From the Spirit-World') (1818).

== Stories ==
Volume	Year	Original title	Literal translation	Author	First English translation
1	1810	"Der Freischütz"	'The Freeshooter'	Apel	1823
1	1810	"Das Ideal"	'The Ideal'	Laun	
1	1810	"Der Geist des Verstorbenen"	'The Ghost of the Deceased'	Laun	2005
1	1810	"König Pfau"	'King Peacock'	Apel	
1	1810	"Die Verwandtschaft mit der Geisterwelt"	'The Connection with the Spirit-World'	Laun	1813
2	1811	"Die Todtenbraut"	'The Dead Bride'	Laun	1813
2	1811	"Die Bräutigamsvorschau"	'The Bridegroom Preview'	Apel	1845
2	1811	"Der Todtenkopf"	'The Death's Head'	Laun	1813
2	1811	"Die schwarze Kammer"	'The Black Chamber'	Apel	1823
2	1811	"Das Todesvorzeichen"	'The Death Omens'	Laun	1825
2	1811	"Der Brautschmuck"	'The Bridal Jewelry'	Apel	1826
2	1811	"Empusa-Lamia: Griechische Sage"	'Empusa-Lamia: Greek Legend'	Apel	1824
2	1811	"Asvit und Asmund: Nordische Sage"	'Asvid and Asmund: Norse Legend'	Apel	
2	1811	"Alp"	'Alp'	Apel	1845
2	1811	"Der Rabe: Griechisches Märchen"	'The Raven: Greek Tale'	Apel	1823
2	1811	"Hildur's Zauberlied: Nordische Sage"	'Hildur's Magic Song: Norse Legend'	Apel	
3	1811	"Die Vorbedeutungen"	'The Portents'	Laun	
3	1811	"Klara Mongomery"	'Clara Montgomery'	Apel	1825
3	1811	"Der Gespensterläugner"	'The Ghost-Deniers'	Laun	
3	1811	"Das Geisterschloß"	'The Ghost-Castle'	Apel	
3	1811	"Der Geisterruf"	'The Ghost Call'	Apel	1835
3	1811	"Der Todtentanz"	'The Dance of the Dead'	Apel	1824
4	1811	"Zwei Neujahrsnächte"	'Two New Year's Nights'	Apel	1824
4	1811	"Der verhängnißvolle Abend"	'The Fateful Evening'	Laun	
4	1811	"Zauberliebe"	'Magic Love'	Apel	
4	1811	"Die Braut im Sarge"	'The Bride in the Coffin'	Laun	
4	1811	"Das unterirdische Glück"	'The Underground Fortune'	Laun	
5 (Note: Also as Wunderbuch volume 1.)	1815	"Der Heckethaler"	'The Hedge Thaler'	Laun	
5	1815	"Der Liebesschwur"	'The Love Oath'	Laun	
5	1815	"Die Ruine von Paulinzell"	'The Ruins of Paulinzell'	Apel	
5	1815	"Die Hausehre"	'The House-Honour'	Laun	
5	1815	"Die Schuhe auf den Stangen"	'The Shoes on the Poles'	Apel	
5	1815	"Legende"	'Legend'	Laun	
5	1815	"Das silberne Fräulein"	'The Silver Maiden'	Apel	1837
6 (Note: Also as Wunderbuch volume 2.)	1816	"Swanehild"	'Swanhilda'	Laun	
6	1816	"Der Schutzgeist"	'The Guardian Spirit'	Apel	1824
6	1816	"Die Wachsfigur"	'The Wax Sculpture'	Laun	
6	1816	"Blendwerke"	'Illusions'	Laun	
6	1816	"Das Meerfräulein"	'The Mermaid'	Laun	1824
6	1816	"Der Mönch"	'The Monk'	Laun	
6	1816	"Der rothe Faden"	'The Red Thread'	Laun	
6	1816	"Der Lügenstein"	'The Lying Stone'	Laun	
7 (Note: As Wunderbuch volume 3.)	1817	"Die drei Templer"	'The Three Templars'	Fouqué	
7	1817	"Der Liebesring"	'The Love Ring'	Laun	
7	1817	"Die Jungfrau des Pöhlberges"	'The Maiden of the Pöhlberg'	Laun	
7	1817	"Der Bergmönch"	'The Mountain Monk'	Miltitz	
7	1817	"Die Fräulein vom See"	'The Maidens from the Lake'	Laun	
7	1817	"Muhme Bleich"	'Aunt Pale'	Miltitz	
7	1817	"Friedbert"	'Friedbert'	Miltitz	
7	1817	"Altmeister Ehrenfried und seine Familie"	'Head Master Ehrenfried and His Family'	Fouqué	1826

== Development ==
According to Friedrich Laun's memoirs, Laun had stayed a week at Apel's family estate at Ermlitz, near Schkopau. A few stories were told about ghosts that appeared there at and after dusk, from the times when a high court was located nearby. These stories made such an impression on Apel and Laun, that when they returned to Leipzig they recounted them to their friends over tea. This proved very popular, and they started to hold Gespensterthee ('ghost tea') evenings from time to time, where ghost stories were told, and which led Apel and Laun to write the Gespensterbuch.

Apel and Laun included stories both with and without ghosts, but also those where the question is left open – an innovation that was later expanded on by other authors. They tried to add variety to the first volume by adding two comic fairy tales: "König Pfau" (Apel's retelling of Madame d'Aulnoy's "La Princesse Rosette") and "Das Ideal" (an original tale by Laun), but the response to these stories was negative, and they did not include fairy tales in later volumes. The first volume also included "Der Freischütz", a story written by Apel about a hunter making a pact with the devil. Johann Georg Theodor Grässe traced the origin of this story to a 1730 book called Monatliche Unterredungen aus dem Reich der Geister ('Monthly Conversations from the Spirit-World') which contained a similar story taken from a 1710 court session in Bohemia. Laun owned a copy of this book, and Grässe theorised that he brought the story to the attention of Apel. Some characters in the stories may have been based on personal acquaintances, such Carl Friedrich Wilhelm Wagner (1770–1813), a police actuary, who may have inspired "Aktuarius Wermuth" in "Die schwarze Kammer".

Both Apel and Laun knew Johann Wolfgang von Goethe, whose play Claudine von Villa Bella (1776) may have influenced Laun's "Die Todtenbraut". Scholar Robert Stockhammer notes that "Der Todtenkopf" contains characters inspired by Cagliostro, who Goethe had written on, and who may have been discussed when Laun visited Goethe in 1804. Goethe's "Erlkönig" (1782) also inspired Apel's poem "Alp".

For the fifth volume, they decided to expand the scope from ghosts to anything that could not be explained by the laws of nature, and gave the series a second title: Wunderbuch ('Book of Wonders'). In another attempt to add variety, they decided to invite other authors to contribute, which led to Apel's friends Friedrich de la Motte Fouqué and Carl Borromäus von Miltitz writing stories for the final volume of the Wunderbuch.

== Publication ==
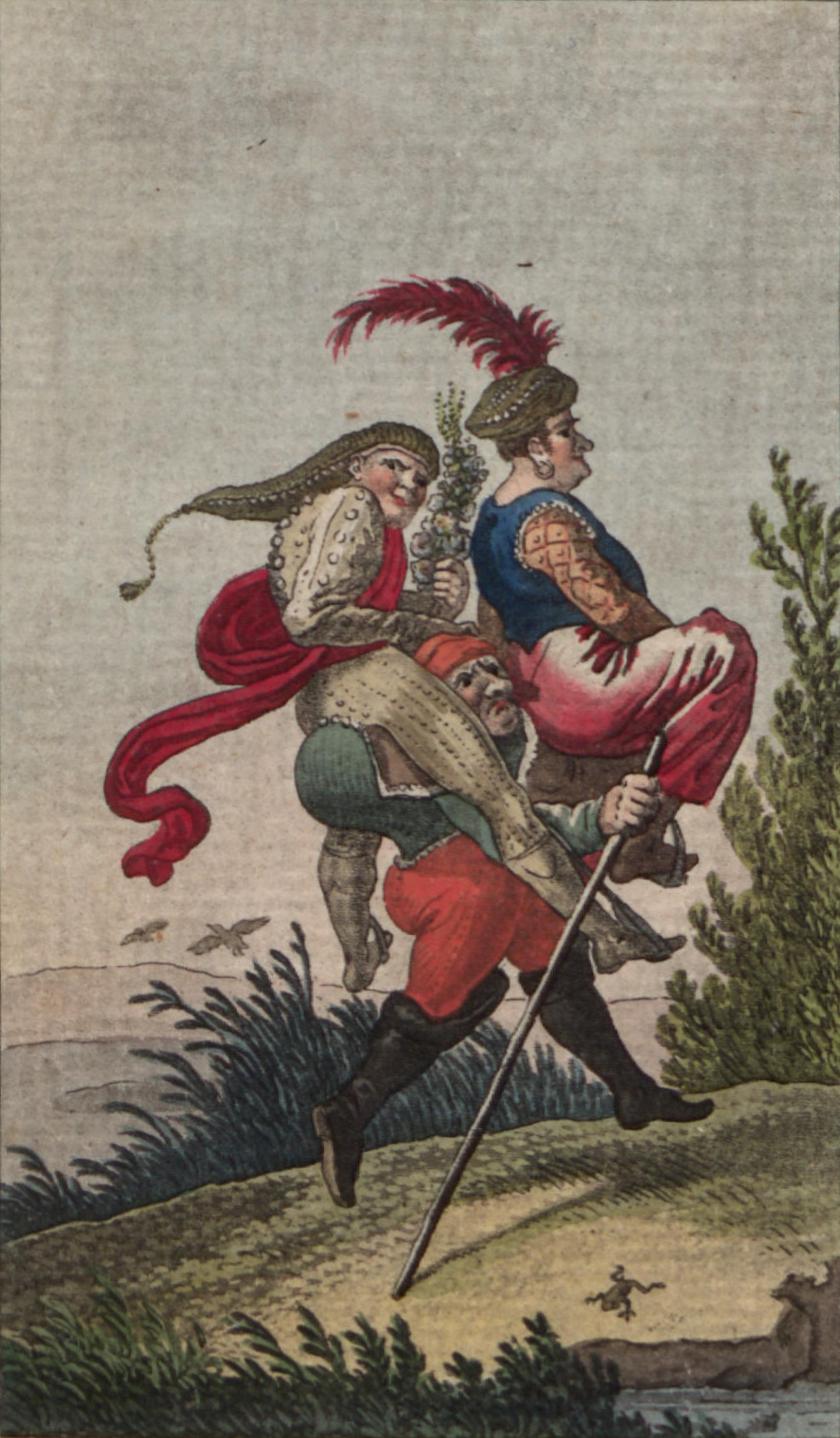
Frontispiece of the first volume by Johann Heinrich Ramberg, depicting "Das Ideal"

The first volume of Gespensterbuch was published in 1810 by G. J. Göschen in Leipzig, with a coloured frontispiece illustration of the story "Das Ideal" ('The Ideal'). Very few copies of this edition have survived, leading many sources to assume the series was published from 1811, when the first volume was reprinted (this time without the frontispiece), simultaneously with the second and third volumes. Volume four was published later in the same year.

The fifth volume was published in 1815 with two title pages: one giving the title as Gespensterbuch volume five, and another with the title Wunderbuch ('Book of Wonders') volume one. This reflected Apel and Laun's decision to expand the scope of the books to include other supernatural stories. Volume six was published in the same way in 1816. The final volume was published in 1817 only under the title Wunderbuch volume three, but the signature marks in page footers of some editions say Gespensterbuch 7 Theil ('Gespensterbuch Volume 7').

The book has been reprinted several times since then. The Macklots published the last four volumes in Stuttgart from 1816–1818. (Note: A. F. Macklot republished Wunderbuch volume one in 1816. Confusingly, J. Macklot published Gespensterbuch volume four as Wunderbuch volume one in 1816, followed by Wunderbuch volumes two and three in 1818.) Following the premiere of Weber's Der Freischütz (1821), Apel's Der Freischütz eine Volkssage was reprinted in its own volume by Fleischer in 1823. Gespensterbuch was reprinted by Philipp Reclam junior in Leipzig (1885), Belser in Stuttgart (1987–1990), and Aufbau-Taschenbuch in Berlin (1991).

== Translations ==
Jean-Baptiste Benoît Eyriès translated five of the Gespensterbuch stories into French for his anthology Fantasmagoriana (1812). (Note: "La Tête de Mort" ('The Death's Head') a translation of "Der Todtenkopf"; "La Morte Fiancée" ('The Death Bride') a translation of "Die Todtenbraut"; "L'Heure fatale" ('The Fatal Hour') a translation of "Die Verwandtschaft mit der Geisterwelt"; "Le Revenant" ('The Revenant') a translation of "Der Geist des Verstorbenen"; "La Chambre noire" ('The Black Chamber') a translation of "Die schwarze Kammer") Three of these were translated from French to English by Sarah Elizabeth Utterson in Tales of the Dead (1813), (Note: "The Fated Hour", a translation of "L'Heure fatale" ("Die Verwandtschaft mit der Geisterwelt"); "The Death's Head", a translation of "La Tête de Mort" ("Der Todtenkopf"); "The Death-Bride", a translation of "La Morte Fiancée" ("Die Todtenbraut")) and again by Marjorie Bowen (1933–1935). (Note: Great Tales of Horror (1933) included: "The Dead Bride", a translation of "La Morte Fiancée" ("Die Todtenbraut"); "The Skull", a translation of "La Tête de Mort" ("Der Todtenkopf"); and More Great Tales of Horror (1935) included: "The Fatal Hour", a translation of "L'Heure fatale" ("Die Verwandtschaft mit der Geisterwelt")) The two remaining stories were translated by both A. J. Day (2005), (Note: "The Ghost of the Departed", a translation of "Le Revenant" ("Der Geist des Verstorbenen"); "The Black Chamber", a translation of "La Chambre noire" ("Die schwarze Kammer"); included together with Utterson's translations in Fantasmagoriana: Tales of the Dead (2005).) and Anna Ziegelhof (2023). (Note: "The Revenant", a translation of "Le Revenant" ("Der Geist des Verstorbenen"); "The Black Chamber", a translation of "La Chambre noire" ("Die schwarze Kammer"); included together with Utterson's translations in Fantasmagoriana Deluxe (2023).) Some of these stories were also translated directly from the German, including Thomas De Quincey's "The Black Chamber" (1823), (Note: "The Black Chamber" (Thomas De Quincey's translation of "Die schwarze Kammer") was published anonymously in Knight's Quarterly Magazine (1823).) "The Fatal Prophecy" in La Belle Assemblée (1824), (Note: "The Fatal Prophecy" (an anonymous translation of "Die Verwandtschaft mit der Geisterwelt") was published in La Belle Assemblée (1824).) and Robert Pearse Gillies's "The Sisters" and "The Spectre Bride" (1826). (Note: "The Sisters" (Robert Pearse Gillies's translation of "Die Verwandtschaft mit der Geisterwelt") and "The Spectre Bride" (Gillies's translation of "Die Todtenbraut") were published in German Stories (1826).)

Following the success of Carl Maria von Weber's opera Der Freischütz (1821), the Gespensterbuch story that it was based on – also called "Der Freischütz" – was translated into English several times. The first translation was by Thomas De Quincey (1823), (Note: Anonymously as "The Fatal Marksman" in Popular Tales and Romances of the Northern Nations (1823).) followed by Walter Sholto Douglas (1825), (Note: Anonymously as "Der Freischütz; or, The Magic Balls" in Tales of the Wild and the Wonderful (1825). A revised version of this translation was published as "The Magic Balls: A Tale of Enchantment" in Bow Bells magazine, volume 15, number 384 (6 December 1871).) George Godfrey Cunningham (1829), (Note: As "Der Freischutz" in Foreign Tales and Traditions (1829) along with "The Piper of Neisse" (Cunningham's translation of "Der Todtentanz").) an anonymous translation (1833), (Note: As The Original Legend of Der Freischütz, or the Free Shot (1833).) and Jacob Wrey Mould (1849). (Note: As "Der Freischütz (The Free-shooter)" in Der Freischütz (The Free-Shooter); A Lyric Folk-Drama (1849).)

The 1820s saw a growing interest in German Romanticist literature in Britain, and several more Gespensterbuch stories began to be translated individually, mostly in magazines and annuals: "The Raven: A Greek Tale" (1823), (Note: "The Raven: A Greek Tale" (Thomas De Quincey's translation of "Der Rabe: Griechisches Märchen") was published anonymously in Knight's Quarterly Magazine (1823).) "The Lamia: Greek Tradition" (1824), (Note: "The Lamia: Greek Tradition" (Thomas De Quincey's translation of "Empusa-Lamia: Griechische Sage") was published anonymously in Knight's Quarterly Magazine (1824).) "The Spectre Unmasked" (1824), (Note: "The Spectre Unmasked" (an anonymous translation of "Der Schutzgeist") was published in The New Monthly Magazine (1824).) "The Dance of the Dead" (1824), (Note: "The Dance of the Dead" (Joseph Gans's translation of "Der Todtentanz") was published in The Literary Magnet (1824).) "Maredata" (1824), (Note: "Maredata" (Joseph Gans's translation of "Das Meerfräulein") was published in The Literary Magnet (1824).) "New Year's Eve: The Omens" (1824), (Note: "New Year's Eve: The Omens" (L. D.'s translation of "Zwei Neujahrsnächte") was published in The Literary Souvenir for 1825 (1824).) "Death Tokens" (1825), (Note: "Death Tokens" (W. S.'s translation of "Das Todesvorzeichen") was published in The European Magazine (1825).) "The Veiled Bride" (1825), (Note: "The Veiled Bride" (an anonymous translation of "Klara Mongomery") was published in The Literary Magnet (1825).) "Head Master Rhenfried and His Family" (1826), (Note: "Head Master Rhenfried and His Family" (Thomas Roscoe's translation of "Altmeister Ehrenfried und seine Familie") was included in The German Novelists (1826).) "The Bridal Ornaments" (1826), (Note: "The Bridal Ornaments" (Walter Sholto Douglas's translation of "Der Brautschmuck") was published in Forget-Me-Not for 1827 (1826).) "The Piper of Neisse" (1829), (Note: "The Piper of Neisse" (George Godfrey Cunningham's translation of "Der Todtentanz") was included in Foreign Tales and Traditions (1829) along with "Der Freischutz".) "The Spirit's Summons" (1835), (Note: "The Spirit's Summons" (J. O.'s translation of "Der Geisterruf") was published in Leigh Hunt's London Journal (1835).) "The Silver Lady" (1837), (Note: "The Silver Lady" (C. Hardinge's translation of "Das silberne Fräulein") was published in The Keepsake for 1838 (1837).) "The Two New Year's Nights" (1839), (Note: "The Two New Year's Nights" (an anonymous translation of "Zwei Neujahrsnächte") was published in Court and Lady's Magazine (1839).) "Fatal Curiosity" (1845), (Note: "Fatal Curiosity" (Mary Ann Youatt's translation of "Die Bräutigamsvorschau") was published in The New Monthly Belle Assemblée (1845).) and "The Night-Mare" (1845). (Note: "The Night-Mare" (Wilhelm Klauer-Klattowski's word-for-word interlinear translation of "Alp") was included in The German Manual for the Young and for Self-Tuition volume 2 (1845).) In addition to these translations, some authors adapted Gespensterbuch stories for an English-speaking audience, such as Walter Sholto Douglas's "The Three Damsels" (1826), based on part of "Die Bräutigamsvorschau", (Note: "The Three Damsels" (Walter Sholto Douglas's translation and adaptation of part of "Die Bräutigamsvorschau") was published in Forget-Me-Not for 1827 (1826).) "The Black Chamber" in Dublin University Magazine (1858), which expands on "Die schwarze Kammer", (Note: "The Black Chamber" (an anonymous translation and adaptation of "Die schwarze Kammer") was published in Dublin University Magazine (1858).) Charles John Tibbits's "A Strange Bride" (1890), an abridged version of Gillies's "The Spectre Bride", (Note: "A Strange Bride" (Charles John Tibbits's revised and abridged version of Robert Pearse Gillies's "The Spectre Bride" (1826), which was a translation of "Die Todtenbraut") was published in Terrible Tales: German (1890).) and J. E. Preston Muddock's "The Dance of the Dead" (1899), a retelling of "Der Todtentanz". (Note: "The Dance of the Dead" (J. E. Preston Muddock's retelling of "Der Todtentanz") was published in Tales of Terror (1899).)

Some translations were never published, such as Walter Sholto Douglas's translation of "Zauberliebe", and a translation of "Der Gespensterläugner" started by De Quincey in autumn 1824.

== Influence ==
=== Freischütz ===
The first tale in the first volume is "Der Freischütz", a retelling by Apel of the Freischütz folktale. It formed the inspiration for Weber's opera Der Freischütz (1821). However, unlike Apel's version, in Weber's opera the final bullet does not kill the protagonist's fiancée, but is deflected, and kills the huntsman who convinced him to cast the bullets instead.

=== Frankenstein, The Vampyre, and Manfred ===
In June 1816, Lord Byron, Mary Shelley, Percy Bysshe Shelley, John William Polidori and Claire Clairmont read Fantasmagoriana (1812), a collection of German ghost stories translated into French, five of which were from the Gespensterbuch. Inspired by the book, the group decided to write their own ghost stories, with Mary Shelley writing Frankenstein, and Polidori writing The Vampyre, based on Byron's "Fragment of a Novel".

Two of the five Gespensterbuch stories in Fantasmagoriana had a significant influence on Frankenstein. "Die Todtenbraut" ('The Dead Bride') was one of the two stories Mary Shelley described in her introduction to the 1831 edition of Frankenstein, and the death of Frankenstein's wife Elizabeth may have been inspired by the story, while "Die schwarze Kammer" ('The Black Chamber') is similar to Mary Shelley's account of the dream that inspired Frankenstein, of a haunting figure standing at the bedside.

Another of the Gespensterbuch stories in Fantasmagoriana, "Die Verwandtschaft mit der Geisterwelt" ('The Connection with the Spirit-World', translated as "L'Heure fatale", 'The Fatal Hour'), may have been an inspiration for the Astarte scene in Byron's Manfred, which he began in late 1816.

=== Other plays and operas ===
Joseph von Auffenberg's 1824 play, Viola, oder die Vorschau ('Viola, or The Preview') was based on Apel's "Die Bräutigamsvorschau" from volume 2 of Gespensterbuch.

Der Bergmönch, an opera based on Carl Borromäus von Miltitz's story of the same name from the final volume, was composed by Joseph Maria Wolfram, with a libretto by Miltitz. It premiered on 14 March 1830 in Dresden.
