= List of works based on Erlkönig =

This is a list of works based on the poem "Erlkönig" by Johann Wolfgang von Goethe. It was set to music by several classical composers, most notably by Franz Schubert in his 1815 composition for voice and piano, and arranged for various settings by other composers. Use of the poem in contemporary music and other media is listed below.

== Works ==
=== Film and television ===
- 1931 film directed by Marie-Louise Iribe, Le Roi des aulnes and its German-language version Der Erlkönig.
- Experimental filmmaker Raymond Salvatore Harmon created an 8-minute puppet animation titled Der Erlkönig using a remixed version of the Schubert composition as the score and based on the original text of the poem.
- In the 1988 film Burning Secret, Baron Alexander recites the final lines of Goethe's poem while holding the boy Edmund in a swimming pool (water itself being a symbol of birth and death). This moment represents the high point of their affection, whereafter the baron turns his attentions elsewhere. Here the quote also suggests the death of a child as such, on the way to maturity.
- Pan's Labyrinth, a 2006 dark fantasy film, written, directed and co-produced by Guillermo del Toro, refers to similar fantasy themes, that lie solely on the viewer's imagination. In the movie, in war-torn 1944 Francoist Spain, a ten-year-old Ofelia is told she is a reincarnated princess of the Underworld. She then has to complete three tasks to in order for her to acquire immortality and return to her kingdom. Whether these events are real or just a part of her imagination is left to the viewer.
- Georges Schwizgebel adapted the poem into the 2015 animated short film Erlking.
- In the 2015 film Pay the Ghost, the protagonist, played by Nicolas Cage, recites part of this poem during a lecture to a college classroom; the antagonist of the film seems to have some of the effect of Goethe's Erl King.
- The 2020 short film The Erl King is a modern reimagining of Goethe's poem and features a reading of the original text in its conclusion.
- Referenced in the Boardwalk Empire episode "Erlkönig" (2013).

=== Prose fiction ===
- The fictional annotator of Vladimir Nabokov's novel Pale Fire offers a translation into the fictional language of Zembla of the opening lines: Ret woren ok spoz on natt ut vett?/ Eto est votchez ut mid ik dett. (note on line 662)
- In 1918 a Yiddish adaption titled Der valdkeyzer was published by Moshe Lifshits.
- In the novel Le Roi des Aulnes (1970), Michel Tournier identified the Erlkönig with his protagonist, and in turn with the German people during World War II, in the deliberate appeal the Nazis made to youth, ultimately sending them to their deaths in battle. The Volker Schlöndorff film The Ogre is an adaptation of Tournier's story.
- British author Angela Carter retells the legend in a short story called "The Erl-King", first published in her short-story collection The Bloody Chamber (1979).
- A short story entitled "The Erl-King" written by Elizabeth Hand is inspired by the Goethe poem but is set in modern day. It first appeared in the anthology Full Spectrum 4 in 1993.
- Goethe ballad was alluded to by Andrzej Sapkowski in the last novel of the Witcher Saga, The Lady of the Lake. Auberon Muircetach, The King of the Elves, leading the People of the Alders (and thus the de facto King of the Alders) imprisons Cirilla, one of the main heroines of the saga, in his world.
- In the Japanese visual novel The Devil on G-String, "Der Erlkönig", and the Schubert piece it inspired, play a prominent role as a recurring theme.
- In Frank Tallis's 2008 crime novel Fatal Lies, the psychoanalyst Max Liebermann and police inspector Oskar Rheinhardt perform first Loewe's treatment of the text, then Schubert's. A discussion between the characters about the relative quality of Schubert's and Loewe's respective settings becomes an early pivot-point in the novel's plot.
- American novelist Kevin Flinn's 2009 novel, Through the Night and Wind, takes its name from the first line of the poem and features the first two lines as part of an elaborate dream sequence.
- Sarah Shun-lien Bynum's short story "The Erlking" appeared in the 5 July 2010 issue of The New Yorker as part of the magazine's showcasing of twenty significant American fiction writers under the age of forty. In the story, a mother and her small daughter visit a fairy-themed fundraiser at a Waldorf School. There, the girl (whose name Ondine also stems from European folklore) becomes fixated on a mysterious man whom she perceives to be hiding a surprise for her under his cape. Bynum, in an interview on The New Yorker's website, stated that the inspiration for her story came in part from Goethe's "The Erlking".
- The 2012 Icelandic novel Töfrahöllin has been argued to have modelled one of its main characters, Kormákur Cooltran, on the King in "Der Erlkönig".
- John Connolly's collection of five supernatural stories Nocturnes (2004) includes "The Erlking".
- Marissa Meyer's Gilded Duology (2021) is based on a combination of Rumpelstiltskin and Erlkonig.
- S. Jae-Jones’s “Wintersong Duology” (2017) features “Der Erlkönig,” or “The Goblin King,” as the story’s seductive antagonist from whose Underground kingdom the hero must rescue her beautiful sister.

=== Poetry ===
- Johann August Apel's poem "Alp", in Gespensterbuch (volume 2, 1811), was based on the "Erlkönig", but using the folkloric Alp and Aufhocker as the antagonists. A word-for-word English translation of the poem was published as "The Night-Mare" in Wilhelm Klauer-Klattowski's The German Manual for the Young and for Self-Tuition volume 2 (1845).

=== Music ===
- The band KMFDM has a song titled "Erlkönig" on their 2024 album Let Go which uses the poem as lyrics.
- The Rammstein song "Dalai Lama" from the album Reise, Reise is a modernized version of the poem, taking place on an airplane.
- Sequester released "The Erlking", a metal rendition of Schubert's piece with English lyrics inspired by Goethe's poem. The track would be the namesake for the demo "Visions of the Erlking", and would later appear on the studio album Winter Shadows.
- The heavy metal band Pagan Altar's song "The Erl-King" was inspired by the Goethe poem.
- The neofolk band Forseti has a song called "Erlkönig" that uses the poem as lyrics.
- Polish metal band Oberschlesien recorded a music video Król Olch based on Goethe's ballad. The lyrics are in the Silesian dialect.
- The Carolina Chocolate Drops has a song called "Earl King" based on the poem.
- The British classical crossover singer Sarah Brightman released the song "Figlio Perduto" ("Lost Son") in 2000 on her album La Luna. The song is an Italian translation of Goethe's poem by Chiara Ferrau.
- Singer/songwriter Josh Ritter translated and set the poem to music under the name "The Oak Tree King" for his concert series with violinist Hilary Hahn
- The E Nomine song "Die Schwarzen Reiter" begins with the line "Wer reitet so spät durch Nacht und Wind? (Who rides, so late, through night and wind?)", a reference to the poem.
- The poem is used by the German Gothic band Dracul in their song "Erlkönig".
- Norwegian experimental black metal-industrial band Sturmgeist uses shortened and slightly modified version of the poem as lyrics in a song with the same title.
- German industrial-EBM band Kash uses the poem in the song "Erlkönig".
- Norwegian band Jackman also uses the poem "Der Erlkönig" in a modern alternative treatment.
- In the song "Tier in Dir", by the German punk band Jennifer Rostock, parts of the lyrics are the same as the words in the poem.
- The song "Incarnated" from the album Cosmogenesis by Progressive Melodic death metal band Obscura is based on this poem.
- Chapter 20 and Episode 10 of Haven't You Heard? I'm Sakamoto depicts him singing a song made out of this poem.
- The Dutch symphonic metal band Epica released "Once Upon a Nightmare" as part of their 2016 album, The Holographic Principle. The song contains quotes from the poem among its lyrics.
- The Romanian rock band Compact has a song "Jocul ielelor". The song is inspired by the poem.
- Catalan singer-songwriter Roger Mas adapted the poem in his song "El rei dels verns" (the alder king), featured in the 2015 album Irredempt.
- Dutch composer Dick Raaijmakers composed Ballad Erlkönig in 1967. During performances of this electronic composition a film is usually projected in which at certain points in time in the composition lines out of the poem can be seen and read on the screen, adding greatly to the experience.

=== Games ===
- The PlayStation Portable game Work Time Fun features a mini-game based on the poem, which plays the Schubert composition with a Japanese translation of the lyrics as background music. In 1988, an interactive video was displayed at The Kitchen in New York City, which used a video of this song.
- The Project Moon game Limbus Company features a major antagonist based on the Erl-King, named Erlking Heathcliff, in the 6th main story chapter (known as a Canto) of the game. 'Erlking Heathcliff' is an alternate world's version of the 7th Sinner 'Heathcliff', based on Heathcliff from the Wuthering Heights, who seeks to eradicate 'Heathcliff' across every Mirror World as he believes that "every Heathcliff is Catherine's murderer." He is eventually defeated after a direct confrontation with the Sinners, and also after Catherine directly communicates with the protagonist to "Delete All Cathy's", effectively removing Erlking Heathcliff's cause, and therefore removing Catherine from everyone's memory, except for Heathcliff. Erlkonig is also referenced in the Identity "Wild Hunt Heathcliff", as a direct reference to the Wild Hunt and Erlkonig.

=== Theatre ===
- British theatre company Théâtre de Complicité use the poem in The Street of Crocodiles, a piece of theatre based on the stories of Bruno Schulz.
