= Alp (folklore) =

Supernatural creature in German folklore

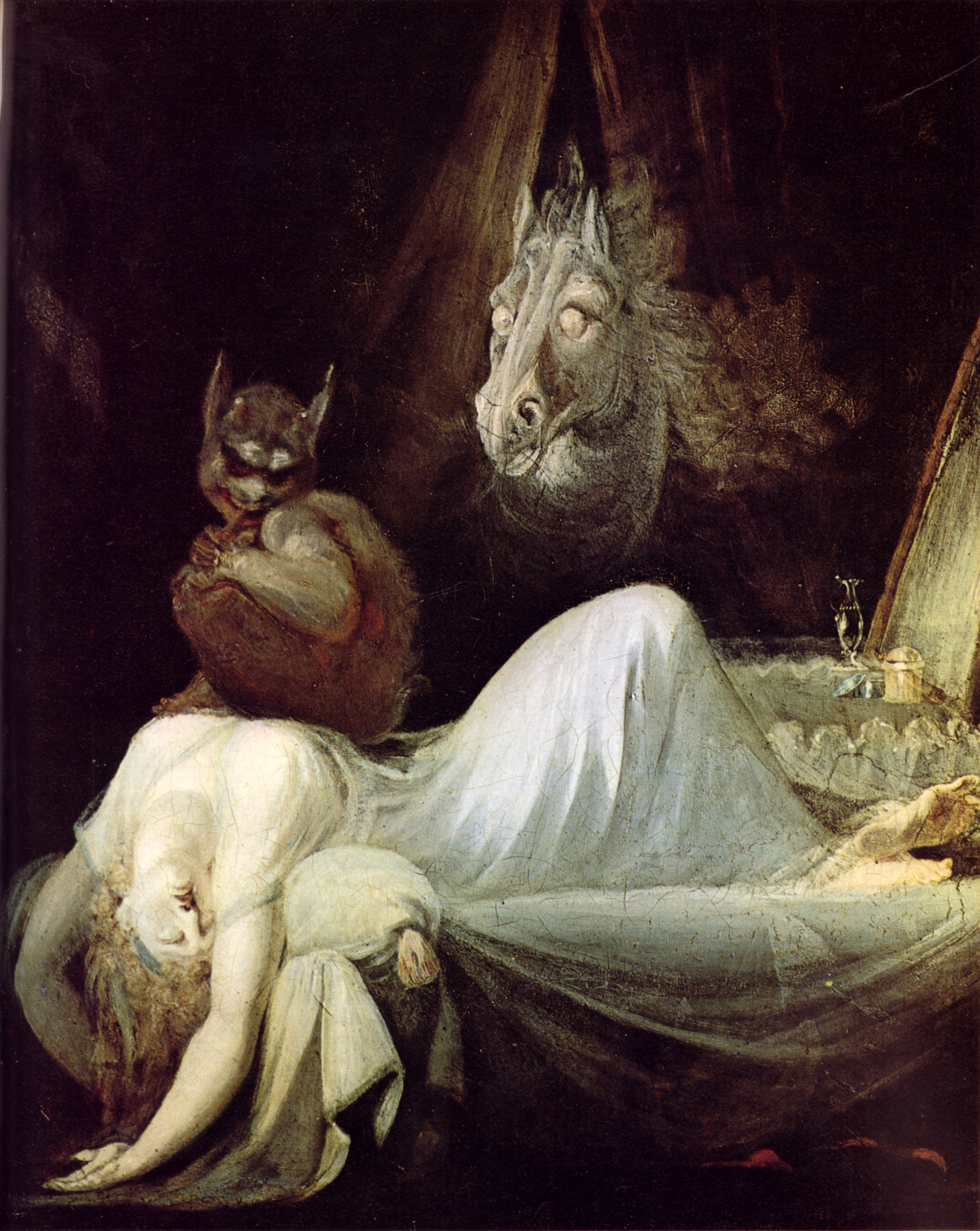
Nachtmahr (Night-mare), by Johann Heinrich Füssli (1802), depicts an alp sitting on the sleeper's chest, with a mare staring through the background.

An alp (German: [alp]; plural alpe or alpen) is a supernatural being in German folklore.

Alp is sometimes likened to a vampire, but its behavior is more akin to that of the incubus. It is distinct from both of these creatures in that it wears a magic cloak called a Tarnkappe, from which it draws its powers. The word Alp is the German form of the word that comes into English as elf, both descended from Common Germanic. It is also known by the following names: trud, mar, mart, mahr, schrat, and walrider. Many variations of the creature exist in surrounding European areas, such as the drude or, in the British Isles, the Old Hag, related to now commonly recognized sleep paralysis.

== In medieval sources ==
In the period before about 1000, the Old High German word alp is attested only in a small number of glosses. It is defined by the Althochdeutsches Wörterbuch as a "nature-god or nature-demon, equated with the Fauns of Classical mythology ... regarded as eerie, ferocious beings ... As the mare he messes around with women". Accordingly, the German word Alpdruck (literally 'elf-oppression') means 'nightmare'. There is also evidence associating elves with illness, specifically epilepsy.

In a similar vein, elves are in Middle High German most often associated with deceiving or bewildering people "in a phrase that occurs so often it would appear to be proverbial: 'die elben/der alp trieget mich' (the elves/elf is/are deceiving me)". The same pattern holds in Early Modern German. This deception sometimes shows the seductive side apparent in English and Scandinavian material: most famously, the early thirteenth-century Heinrich von Morungen's fifth Minnesang begins "Von den elben virt entsehen vil manic man / Sô bin ich von grôzer lieber entsên" ("full many a man is bewitched by elves / thus I too am bewitched by great love"). Elbe was also used in this period to translate words for nymphs.

In the later medieval prayers, Elves appear to be threatening, even demonic, force. Evidence includes Latin prayers found inscribed in lead amulets from southern Scandinavia and Schleswig. The most famous is the fourteenth-century Münchener Nachtsegen, a prayer to be said at night, which includes the lines:

alb vnde ł elbelin Ir sult nich beng' bliben hin albes svestir vn vatir Ir sult uz varen obir dē gatir albes mutir trute vn mar Ir sult uz zu dē virste varē Noc mich dy mare druche Noc mich dy trute zciche Noc mich dy mare rite Noc mich dy mare bescrite Alb mit diner crummen nasen Ich vorbithe dir aneblasen	elf, or also little elf, you shall remain no longer (reading lenger) elf's sister and father, you shall go out over the gate; elf's mother, trute and mare, you shall go out to the roof-ridge! Let the mare not oppress me, let the trute not pinch me (reading zücke), let the mare not ride me, let the mare not mount me! Elf with your crooked nose, I forbid you to blow on [people]

Correspondingly, in the early modern period, elves are described in Northern Germany as doing the evil bidding of witches; Martin Luther believed his mother to have been afflicted in this way.

As in Old Norse, however, there are few characters identified as elves. An elf does appear in an account of the parentage of the hero Hagen (ON Högni) which survives only in the Old Norse Þiðreks saga but which was translated from a German text (now lost). Here, Hagen is the product of his mother Oda being impregnated by an elf (ON álfr) while she lies in bed. Otherwise, it seems likely that in the German-speaking world, elves were to a significant extent conflated with dwarves (Middle High German: getwerc). Thus some dwarves that appear in German heroic poetry have been seen as relating to elves, especially when the dwarf's name is Alberich, which etymologically means 'elf-powerful' (thus Jacob Grimm thought that the name echoed the notion of the king of the nation of elves or dwarves). The Alberich in the epic Ortnit is a dwarf of childlike-stature who turns out to be the real father of the titular hero, having raped his mother. The Alberich who aids Ortnit is paralleled by the French Auberon, who aids Huon de Bordeaux and whose name derives from Alberich. Auberon entered English literature through Lord Berner's translation of the chanson de geste around 1540, then as Oberon, the king of elves and fairies in Shakespeare's A Midsummer Night's Dream (see below).

As the apparent convergence with dwarves suggests, the word alp declined in use in German after the medieval period, though it still occurs in some fossilised uses, most prominently the word for "nightmare", Alptraum ("elf-dream"). Variations of the German elf in later folklore include the moss people and the Weiße Frauen ("White Women"). In Teutonic myth and folklore, Alpe were considered friendly elf-like beings which lived in the mountains, but eventually turned more negative and malevolent. The characteristic magic that the Alpe possess also bear the creature much resemblance to the Kobold, particularly Hodekin. As in English, however, twentieth-century fantasy fiction has helped to reinvigorate the term. J. R. R. Tolkien recommended using the older German form Elb in his "Guide to the Names in The Lord of the Rings" (1967) and Elb, Elben was consequently introduced in the 1972 German translation of The Lord of the Rings, having a role in repopularising the form in German.

== Post-medieval folklore ==
An Alp is typically male, while the mara and mart appear to be more feminine versions of the same creature. Its victims are often females, whom it attacks during the night, controlling their dreams and creating horrible nightmares (hence the German word Alptraum ["elf-dream"], meaning a nightmare). An Alp attack is called an Alpdruck, or often Alpdrücke, which means "elf-pressure". Alpdruck is when an Alp sits astride a sleeper's chest and becomes heavier until the crushing weight awakens the terrified and breathless dreamer. The victim awakes unable to move under the Alp's weight. This may have been an early explanation for sleep apnea and sleep paralysis, as well as night terrors. It may also include lucid dreams.

Sexual attacks by the Alp are rare.

The Alp is often associated with vampires because it will drink blood from the nipples of men and young children, though women are the preferred victim of the invariably male Alp, for it favors the taste of breast milk.

Alpe also exhibit a tendency for mischief similar to elves, like souring milk and re-diapering a baby; a maid must sign a cross on the diaper or the Alp will put the soiled diaper back on her child. They also enjoy tangling hair into "elfknots" or chewing and twisting horse's tails. They will ride a horse to exhaustion during the night and may sometimes crush smaller farm animals such as geese to death during a pressing attack. Alpe are also similarly blamed for minor illnesses and milking cows dry, for they enjoy the taste of cow's milk as well.

The Alp, in many cases, is considered a demon, but there have been some instances in which the Alp is created from the spirits of recently dead relatives, more akin to a spirit or ghost. Children may become an Alp if a woman bites a horse collar to ease the pain during an extremely long and tortuous childbirth. Also, a child born with a caul} or hair on the palms may become an Alp. If a woman who is pregnant is frightened by an animal, the child may be born an Alp. Stillborn infants are also suspected to return from the grave as Alpe and torment their family. People who have eyebrows that meet are suspected to be Alpe. As with the case of werewolves, sometimes a normal human or animal may become an Alp during the night. They are typically unaware of their nocturnal activities and are invariably in disguise while doing so. Finding an Alp while it is not active simply requires injuring or otherwise marking it during one of its attacks, and seeking out the being with a similar mark during the day. The person can then be cured if it is found out who sent them the curse, or how they became cursed to begin with. Witchcraft is often the prime suspect in this case.

Sometimes an Alp is a spirit summoned by a witch or an evil person wishing harm on another, and sent to torment them. Tricking an Alp may lead a person to its master.

=== Characteristics ===
The Alp is best known for its shapeshifting abilities, similar to the creatures from werewolf lore. It may change into a cat, pig, dog, snake or a small white butterfly. It has also been said that it can fly like a bird and ride a horse. The Alp always wears a hat, giving it an almost comical appearance. The hat is known as a Tarnkappe (the literal translation being "camouflage cap" or "cap of concealment") which is simply a hat (or less commonly a veil) that gives the Alp magic powers and the ability to turn invisible while worn (see also cloak of invisibility). The hat is visible no matter what shape the Alp takes. An Alp who has lost this hat will offer a great reward for its safe return. The Alp also possesses an "evil eye" whose gaze will inflict illness and misfortune. Removing or damaging this eye also removes the Alp's malicious intentions.

Protections against an Alp include laying a broomstick under a pillow, iron horseshoes hung from the bedpost, placing shoes against the bed with the toes pointing toward the door, or placing a mirror on the chest. Steel and crosses are also used. If awoken by the Alp and finding him still there, one can address him by asking him to return in the morning to borrow something or have coffee. The Alp will dash away at once, arriving in the morning either in his "true" form, or else in the form of a human with eyebrows that meet to receive his gifts. The creature can be convinced to leave the victim alone at this time, but the Alp will beg pitifully and at length not to be turned away. Plugging up any holes, specifically keyholes, before a visitation will keep the Alp out. Plugging them during a visitation will invariably seal it inside the room, as they can leave only through their original entrance. A light kept constantly on during the night will also effectively ward off an Alp. A sentry may also be employed to wait and watch for the Alp to attack the helpless sleeper, the Alp may be driven away if caught by someone not under the Alp's influence. Similar to the German Neuntoter, Alpe are weakened or immobilized by shoving a lemon in its mouth should it be caught resting during the day. The Alp appears all but impossible to kill, and sometimes even after being turned away it may reappear years later in a worse mood.

== See also ==
- "Alp", a poem by Johann August Apel in Gespensterbuch volume 2 (1811)
- Drude
- Dwarf
- Elf
- Mare (folklore)
- Nightmare
- Schrat
- Trauco

== Bibliography ==
- Edwards, Cyril, 'Heinrich von Morungen and the Fairy-Mistress Theme', in Celtic and Germanic Themes in European Literature, ed. by Neil Thomas (Lewiston, N. Y.: Mellen, 1994), pp. 13–30
- Hall, Alaric (2007). Elves in Anglo-Saxon England: Matters of Belief, Health, Gender and Identity. Boydell Press. ISBN 978-1-84383-294-2.
- Hall, Alaric, 'Elves', in The Ashgate Encyclopedia of Literary and Cinematic Monsters, ed. by Jeffrey Andrew Weinstock (Farnham: Ashgate, 2014), https://web.archive.org/web/20161212211103/http://www.alarichall.org.uk/ashgate_encyclopedia_elves.pdf.
- Motz, Lotte, The Wise One of the Mountain: Form, Function and Significance of the Subterranean Smith. A Study in Folklore, Göppinger Arbeiten zur Germanistik, 379 (Göppingen: Kümmerle, 1983).
