= Sequestrate =

Sequestrate may refer to:

- pertaining either to secotioid or gasteroid
- to sequester
