= The Bride of Messina =

1803 play written by Friedrich Schiller

The Bride of Messina (German: Die Braut von Messina, German pronunciation: [diː ˈbʁaʊ̯t fɔn mɛˈsiːna]) is a tragedy by Friedrich Schiller; it premiered on 19 March 1803 in Weimar. It is one of the most controversial works by Schiller, due to his use of elements from Greek tragedies (which were considered obsolete at the time it was written).

In the play, Schiller attempts to combine antique and modern theatre. It is set in Sicily, at a time when Paganism and Christianity meet, thus again outlining this theme.

The work was notably adapted in two operas, Nevěsta messinská, by composer Zdeněk Fibich (premiered in 1884), and "La sposa di Messina" by the Italian composer Nicola Vaccai (premiered in 1839). Robert Schumann wrote an overture to Die Braut von Messina, his Opus 100, as did Carl Borromäus von Miltitz, which was performed in 1838 but never published.
