= Orbis Latinus =

Latin-German dictionary written by Johann Georg Theodor Grässe

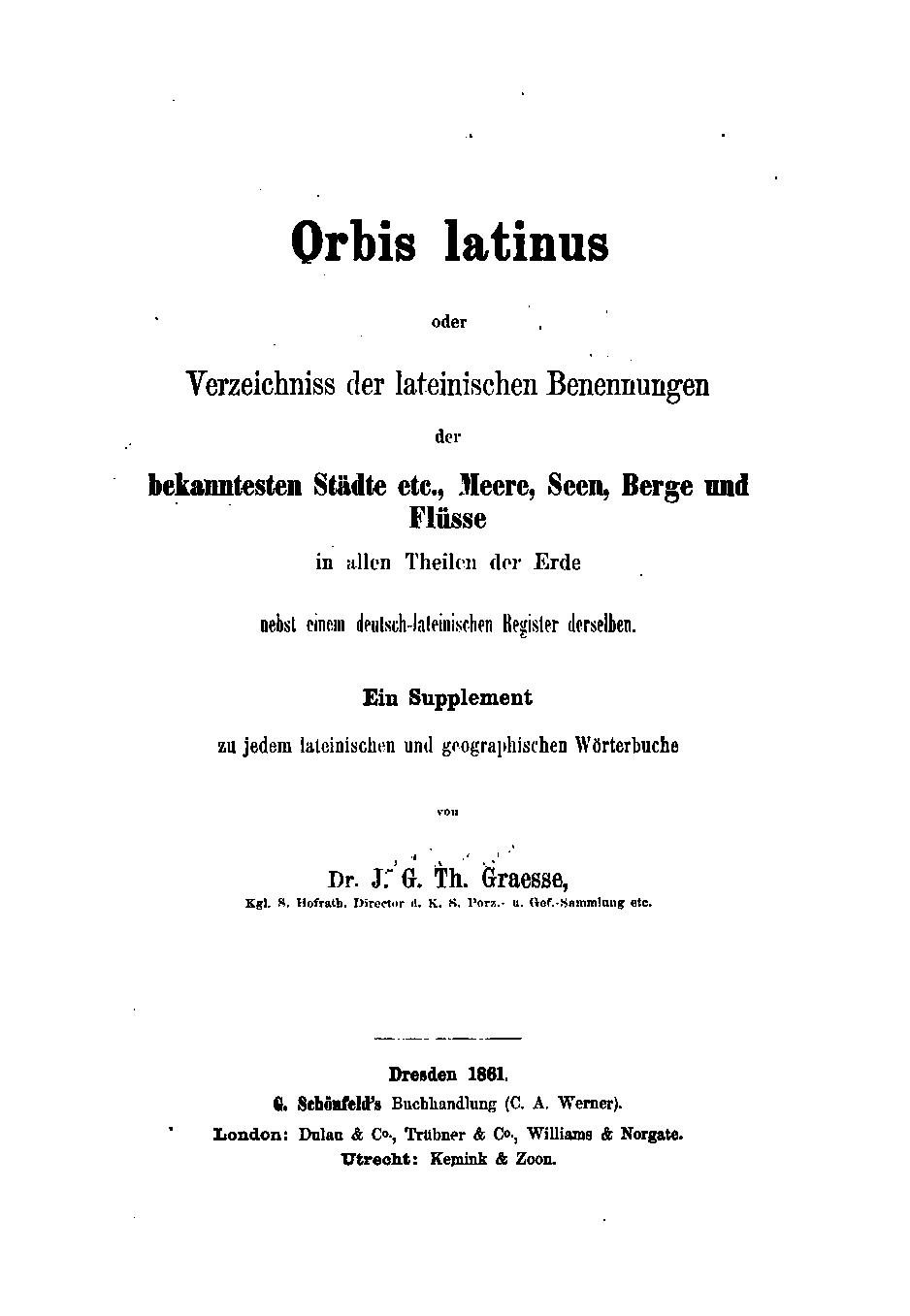
- Author: Dr. J. G. Th. Grasse
- Publication date: 1961

Orbis Latinus, originally Orbis latinus' and by Dr. J. G. Th. Grässe, is a Latin-German dictionary of Latin place names. Most recently updated in 1972, it is the most comprehensive modern reference work of Latin toponymy, covering antiquity to modern times.

== History ==
Johann Georg Theodor Grässe (1814–1885), a librarian, art historian, and literary scholar, published the first edition of Orbis latinus in 1861. Although this first edition already listed a considerable number of names from around the world, it contained large gaps, especially in its coverage of more obscure locations. There followed a 1909 edition, almost doubled in size, under the direction of the University of Breslau Professor Frederick Benedict (b. 1850), who evaluated previously published sources and historical works far more systematically. Benedict increased the keywords of Orbis, especially in regard to central Europe and the Middle Ages, but largely ignored areas outside of Europe, and did not consider material beyond the early modern period. Nevertheless, this work was re-released in a third edition, substantially unchanged, in 1922.

In the decades after World War II, Helmut Plechl (b. 1920), together with Sophie-Charlotte Plechl, began work on the fourth edition of Orbis Latinus, adding many names of monasteries, mountains, and bodies of water, and taking into account material dating from antiquity to the Latin literature of the nineteenth century. This was first published in a one-volume manual edition in 1971, followed by a large three-volume edition in 1972. Due to the political instability of the period, the political boundaries of Germany as they existed in 1937 were used for the work.

The Bavarian State Library made images of the three-volume 1972 edition available online in July 2010, and has also made a full-text searchable version available.
