= Der Freischütz =

1821 German opera by Carl Maria von Weber

- Opera by Carl Maria von Weber
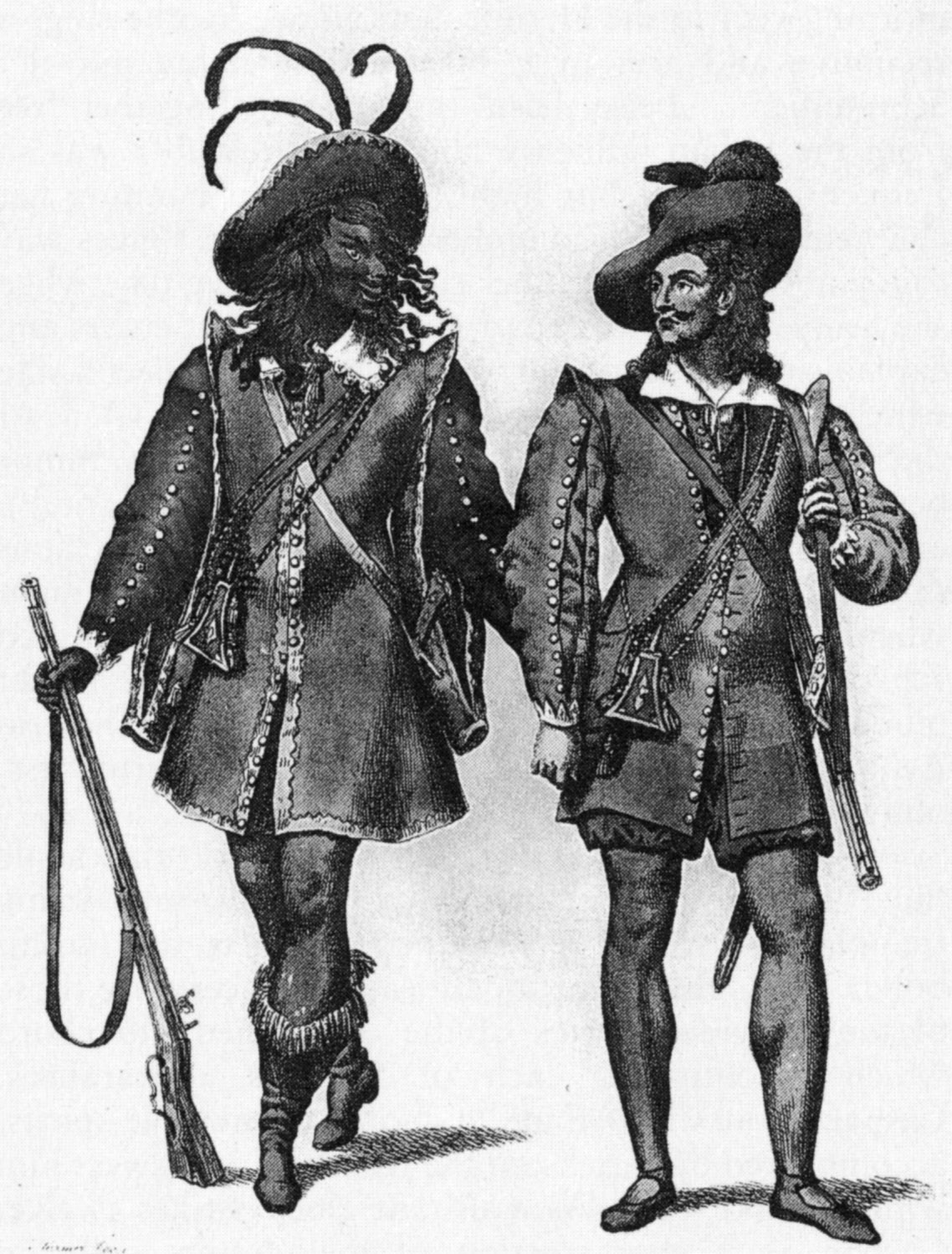
- Costume designs for Samiel and Kaspar in the original production
- Translation: The Marksman or The Freeshooter
- Librettist: Friedrich Kind
- Language: German
- Premiere: 18 June 1821; Schauspielhaus Berlin

Der Freischütz (J. 277, Op. 77 The Marksman or The Freeshooter) is a German opera with spoken dialogue in three acts by Carl Maria von Weber with a libretto by Friedrich Kind, based on the story "The Fatal Marksman" by Johann August Apel from the 1810 collection Gespensterbuch. It premiered on 18 June 1821 at the Schauspielhaus Berlin. It is considered the first German Romantic opera.

The opera's plot is mainly based on Apel's tale "The Fatal Marksman" from the Gespensterbuch though the hermit, Kaspar and Ännchen are new to Kind's libretto. That Weber's tunes were just German folk music is a common misconception. Its unearthly portrayal of the supernatural in the famous Wolf's Glen scene has been described as "the most expressive rendering of the gruesome that is to be found in a musical score".

== Performance history ==
The reception of Der Freischütz surpassed Weber's own hopes and it quickly became an international success, with productions in Vienna the same year followed by Dresden, Leipzig, Hamburg, Munich, Karlsruhe, Königsberg, Prague, other German centres, Riga and Copenhagen. 1824 saw productions in four London theatres in four different adaptations, as well as an inadequate adaptation by François Castil-Blaze in French, named Robin des Bois at the Théâtre de l'Odéon.

In 1838 the then 18-year-old Jenny Lind scored her first great success performing the role of Agathe at the Royal Swedish Opera; she would then go on to become one of the greatest and most famous singers of the 19th Century.

To get round the Paris Opera's ban on spoken text, a version in French with recitatives was prepared in 1841 by Hector Berlioz – who greatly admired the opera and feared other arrangers might do worse – which incorporated his orchestration of Weber's Invitation to the Dance to serve as a ballet, another Paris Opera requirement. Pyotr Ilyich Tchaikovsky criticised Berlioz's arrangement in the Bolshoi Theatre production of 1873 as "utterly incongruous", "tasteless" and "silly" because it inserted into the rustic opera an urban piece of music. In 1879 he again criticised a performance in Paris:

Der Freischütz afforded me great pleasure; in many places in the first act my eyes were moist with tears. In the second act Krauss pleased me greatly by her wonderful rendition of Agathe's aria. The Wolf's Glen was staged not at all as splendidly as I had expected. The third act was curious because of the French brazenness with which they took the liberty, on the one hand, of inserting Invitation à la valse with the most stupid dances, and, on the other, of cutting out the role of the hermit who appears at the end for the dénouement.

Berlioz's arrangement again underlay the production at the Paris Opéra-Comique in 2011. His orchestration of Invitation à la valse soon became a concert piece in its own right.

Weber's overture and the "Huntsmen's Chorus" from act 3 ("With princely enjoyment and manly employment") are often performed as concert pieces.

== Roles ==
Roles, voice types, and premiere cast
Role	Voice type	Premiere cast, 18 June 1821 Conductor: Carl Maria von Weber
Ottokar, a sovereign prince	baritone	Gottlieb Rebenstein
Kuno, a hereditary forester (Note: Sometimes anglicized as "Cuno")	bass	Carl Wauer
Agathe, his daughter	soprano	Caroline Seidler
Ännchen, a young relative	soprano	Johanna Eunike (Note: Weber added a romanza to the third act ("Einst träumte meiner sel'gen Base") especially for Johanna Eunike, which she performed to great acclaim at the premiere.)
Caspar, first assistant forester	bass	Heinrich Blume
Max, second assistant forester	tenor	Heinrich Stümer
Samiel, the 'Black Huntsman'	spoken	Joseph Hillebrand
Hermit	bass	Johann Georg Gern
Kilian, a wealthy peasant	baritone	August Wiedemann
Four bridesmaids	soprano	Henriette Reinwald etc.
Hunters, peasants, spirits, attendants

== Synopsis ==
Overture
Performed by the Skidmore College Orchestra

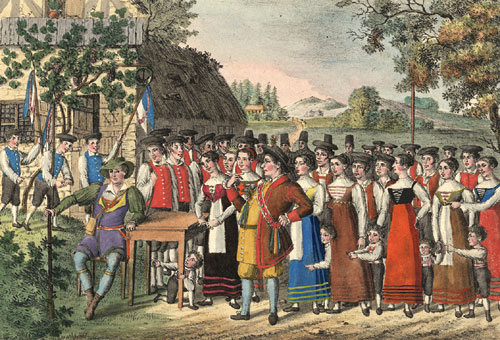
An 1822 illustration of Der Freischütz depicting the opening scene with Max and Kilian

Place: Bohemia
Time: shortly after the end of the Thirty Years' War

=== Act 1 ===
At a shooting contest, the second assistant forester, Max, loses to a peasant, Kilian, who is proclaimed "King of marksmen" (Chorus: Viktoria! Der Meister soll leben—"Victory! Long live the master"). Kilian mocks him good-naturedly (Schau der Herr mich an als König—"Let him gaze on me as king").

Max wants to marry Agathe, daughter of the head forester Kuno. In order to marry her and succeed her father as head forester, he has to prove his marksmanship and score in a shooting trial before Ottokar, the sovereign prince, on the following day.

As Max has had ill luck for several days, he muses upon his prospects of losing Agathe by failing the shooting test (Trio of Kuno, Kaspar, and Max; chorus: O diese Sonne—"O this sun"). Left alone in deep melancholy, he recalls happy days (Aria: Durch die Wälder, durch die Auen—"Through the forests, through the meadows").

Kaspar, the first assistant forester, falsely tries to imbue Max with wine and courage (Hier im ird'schen Jammerthal—"Here in this vale of tears"). He had hoped to marry Agathe himself but she had rejected him and chosen Max. The marriage would make Max the heir of Kuno who would see Max as a son. Kaspar seeks revenge upon all three—his rival, his former sweetheart and her father. (Note: This motive is omitted in the English translation.) He hands Max his gun and Max, to his own astonishment, hits an eagle soaring at a great height. Kaspar explains that the gun had been loaded with his last magic bullet.

He persuades Max to meet him at midnight in the terrible Wolf's Glen to cast seven more of the magic bullets. (Six hit, but the seventh belongs to the Evil One who can guide it wherever he pleases.) He warns Max not to tell a soul about their purpose so as not to endanger them. Left alone, Kaspar triumphs and boasts of his insidiousness (Aria: Schweig'! damit dich niemand warnt—"Silence! So that nobody warns you.").

=== Act 2 ===
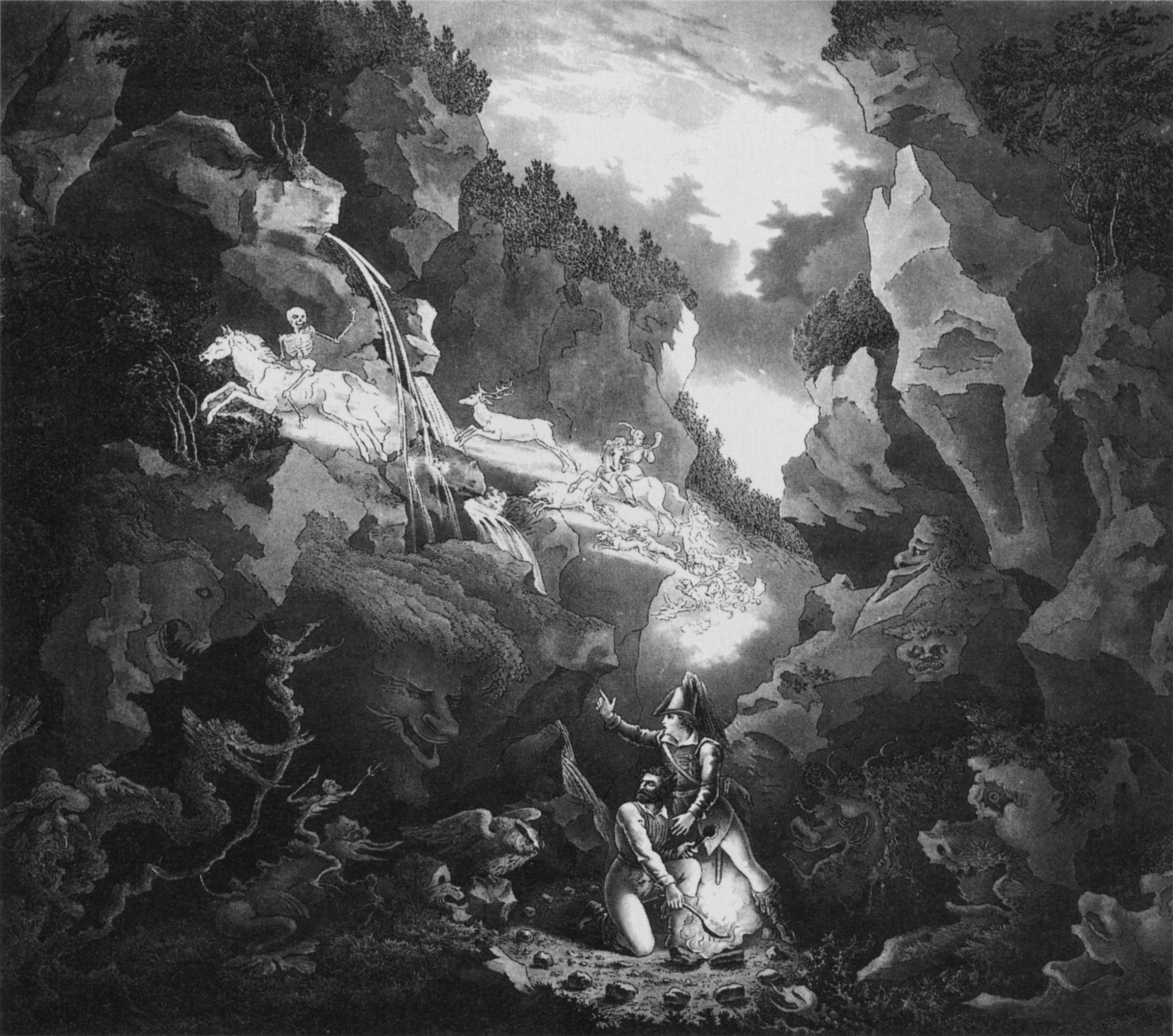
Design for the Wolf's Glen (1822, Weimar)

Agathe's chamber

At the moment when Max shoots the magic bullet, a picture of Agathe's ancestor hanging on the wall falls to the floor, slightly wounding her. Agathe's cousin and companion Ännchen refastens the hook (Duet: Schelm, halt fest!—"Rogue, hold fast!"). She endeavours to cheer Agathe with jests (Ännchen: Kommt ein schlanker Bursch gegangen—"Comes a pretty boy this path"). Agathe, still disturbed, tells of her meeting with the hermit. He had indicated a danger from which his white consecrated roses would protect her.

Left alone, Agathe awaits Max with the news of his success (Recitative and aria: Wie nahte mir der Schlummer...Leise, leise—"How did slumber approach me...Low, low"). Max arrives, acknowledging that while he has not been the victor, he has killed an eagle. Though the night is falling, he has to leave again to bring in a stag which he had shot in the Wolf's Glen (Trio: Wie? Was? Entsetzen!—"What? What? Oh, horror!").

The Wolf's Glen at night

As the bell chimes twelve Kaspar calls upon Samiel, the Black Huntsman, for assistance in casting the magic bullets. Having already sold his own soul, which is due the next day, Kaspar offers Max's soul in exchange for a prolongation of his soul of three years. Agathe is to be killed by Max's magic bullet, despair will then make Max and Kuno the Devil's. Samiel agrees ambiguously: "So be it—By the gates of hell! Tomorrow he or you!"

As Max arrives, the spirit of his mother warns him to abandon the project. But Samiel conjures up Agathe, seemingly drowning herself in despair, whereupon Max plunges into the glen. With demoniacal noise, the casting of the bullets begins.

=== Act 3 ===
The meeting of the marksmen (Note: This scene is omitted in the English translation.)

Having split the seven bullets between them, Max has used three during the hunt in the morning. Kaspar spoils his three on a fox. Thus Max's remaining bullet is the seventh, the Devil's bullet.

Agathe's chamber

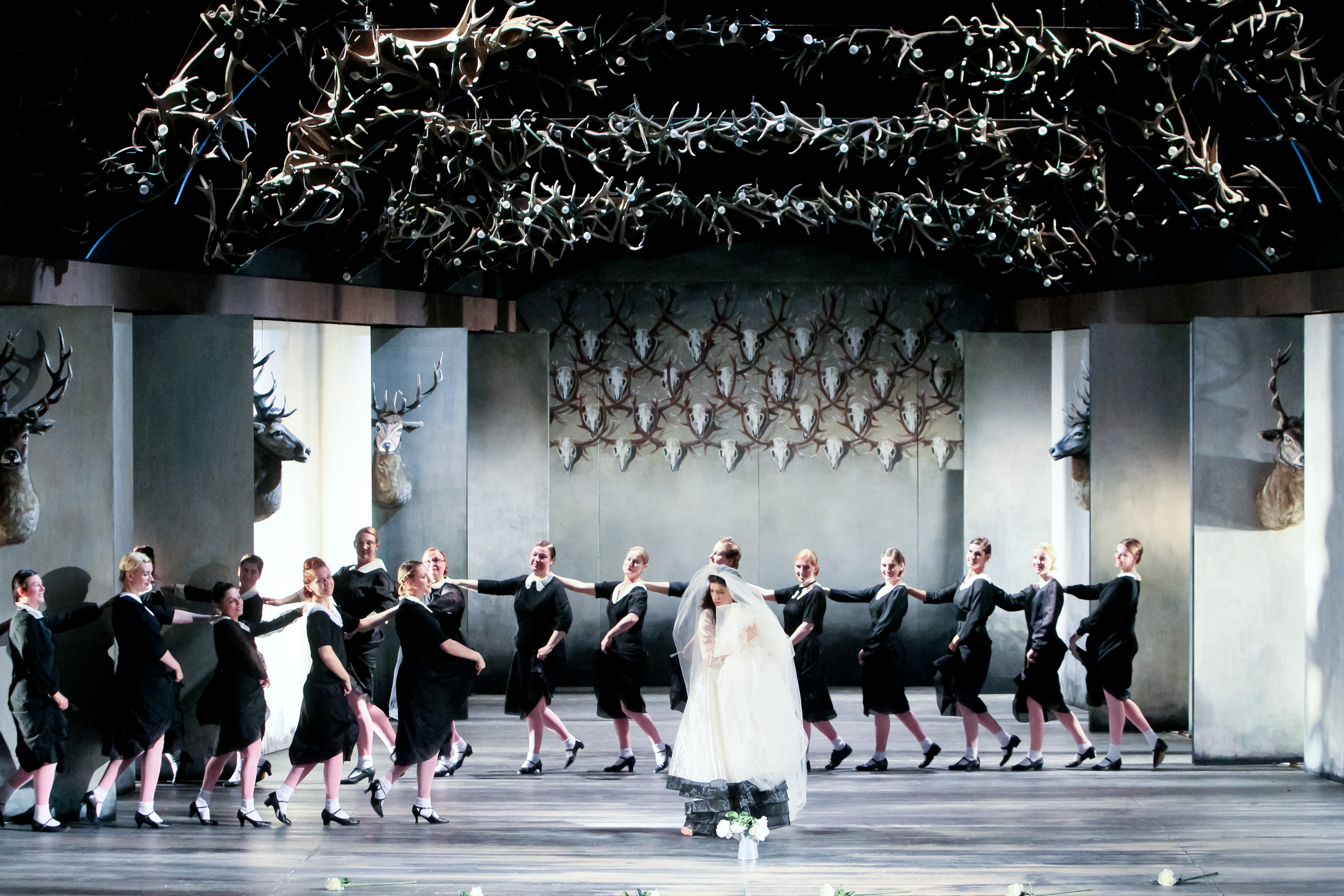
Wir winden dir den Jungfern-Kranz

Agathe is praying (Aria: Und ob die Wolke sie verhülle—"Though clouds obscure"), her doubts having returned owing to a dream of ill omen where she was a white dove which Max shot. Ännchen tries to cheer her with a ghost tale (Aria: Einst träumte meiner sel'gen Base—"My deceased cousin had a dream"). The bridesmaids bring the box with the bridal wreath (Song: Wir winden dir den Jungfern-Kranz—"We wind round thee the bridal wreath"). But as they open it they find a funeral wreath. Recalling the hermit's promise that the white roses will protect her, Agathe proposes to twine them to the bridal wreath.

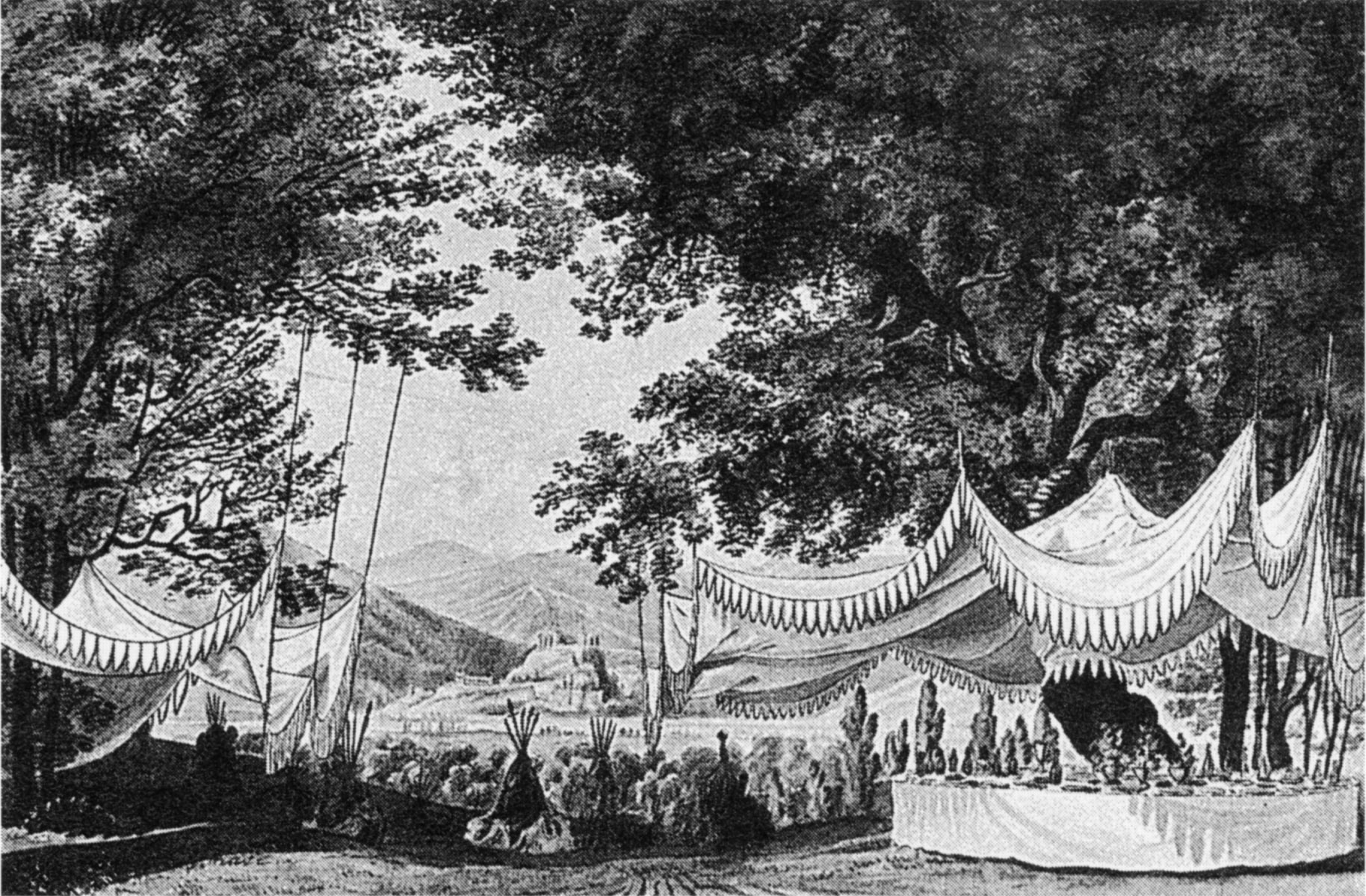
Design for the act 3 finale (original 1821 production)

The marksmanship trial

Prince Ottokar awaits Max at his tent (Chorus of foresters: Was gleicht wohl auf Erden—"What excels the pleasures of the chase"). As a test, Max is ordered to shoot the dove pointed out to him. Max takes aim, fires and Agathe, who has just entered the scene, falls as if hit (Finale: Schaut, o schaut—"See, oh see"). But her bridal wreath and the hermit behind her have deflected the bullet. It strikes Kaspar. Agathe revives from her faint and Kaspar, seeing a holy hermit by her side, realizes that he has failed. Samiel grasps him instead of Max, whereupon Kaspar expires, cursing hell and heaven.

Prince Ottokar orders the corpse to be thrown into the Wolf's Glen. Then he demands an explanation from Max, who confesses to shooting with magic bullets. Regardless of pleas from Kuno, Agathe, peasants, and huntsmen, the infuriated Prince forbids the marriage and banishes Max from the country.

The hermit seeks to appease the Prince (Aria: Wer legt auf ihn so strengen Bann! Ein Fehltritt, ist er solcher Büssung wert?—"Who lays so strict a sentence upon him? An error, is it worthy of such atonement?"). Only love of Agathe and fear of losing her had caused Max to stray from a life that was formerly without fault. Who is to cast the first stone? Who does not look into his own heart? Once he has completed a faultless probationary year, Max should be allowed to marry Agathe. To the exuberant joy of all the Prince accepts this judgement. After the probation, he himself will place the hand of Agathe in that of Max.

In the end, all join in a prayer of thanks.

== Instrumentation ==
The opera is scored for a standard-sized orchestra composed of:

- In the orchestra pit: 2 piccolos, 2 flutes, 2 oboes, 2 clarinets, 2 bassoons, 4 horns, 2 trumpets, 3 trombones, timpani, strings (violin I and II, viola, cello, double bass);
- Onstage: 1 clarinet, 2 horns, 1 trumpet, violins, cellos.

== Recordings ==
Recordings
Year	Cast (Agathe, Ännchen, Max, Caspar)	Conductor, Opera house and orchestra	Label
1954	Elisabeth Grümmer, Rita Streich, Hans Hopf, Kurt Böhme	Wilhelm Furtwängler, Vienna Philharmonic and Vienna State Opera	CD: EMI Classics; Cat: 67419
1955	Elisabeth Grümmer, Rita Streich, Hans Hopf, Max Proebstl	Erich Kleiber, WDR Rundfunkorchester and WDR Rundfunkchor Köln, (WDR radio production)	CD: Opera D'Oro; Cat: 7038
1959	Elisabeth Grümmer, Lisa Otto, Rudolf Schock, Karl-Christian Kohn	Joseph Keilberth, Berlin Philharmonic	CD: EMI Classics; Cat: 69342
1959	Irmgard Seefried, Rita Streich, Richard Holm, Kurt Böhme	Eugen Jochum, Bavarian Radio Symphony Orchestra and Chorus	CD: Deutsche Grammophon; Cat: 000459302
1967	Claire Watson, Lotte Schädle, Rudolf Schock, Gottlob Frick	Lovro von Matačić, Chorus and orchestra Deutsche Oper Berlin	CD: Eurodisc; Cat: 7791-2-RG
1969	Birgit Nilsson, Erika Köth, Nicolai Gedda, Walter Berry	Robert Heger, Chor and orchestra Bavarian State Opera Munich	CD: EMI Electrola Collection; Cat: 7235482
1973	Gundula Janowitz, Edith Mathis, Peter Schreier, Theo Adam	Carlos Kleiber, Staatskapelle Dresden and MDR Rundfunkchor, Leipzig	CD: Deutsche Grammophon; Cat: 457 736–2
1980	Hildegard Behrens, Helen Donath, René Kollo, Peter Meven	Rafael Kubelík, Bavarian Radio Symphony and chorus	CD: Decca; Cat: 417119
1990	Karita Mattila, Eva Lind, Francisco Araiza, Ekkehard Wlaschiha	Sir Colin Davis, Staatskapelle Dresden and MDR Rundfunkchor, Leipzig	CD: Decca/Philips; Cat: 478015
1999	Inga Nielsen, Malin Hartelius, Peter Seiffert, Matti Salminen	Nikolaus Harnoncourt, Zürich Opera	Blu-ray: Arthaus Musik; Cat: 8556882
2010	Juliane Banse, Regula Mühlemann, Michael König, Michael Volle	Daniel Harding, London Symphony Orchestra and Berlin Radio Choir	Hunter's Bride (Note: Not a video of a stage production, but instead designated a "film opera".); DVD: Constantin Film; Cat: HC087848; Blu-ray: Arthaus Musik
2012	Christine Brewer, Sally Matthews, Simon O'Neill, Lars Woldt	Sir Colin Davis, London Symphony Orchestra and London Symphony Chorus, (Recording of a live concert performance at the Barbican in London on 21 April)	CD: LSO Live; Cat: 0726
2019	Lise Davidsen, Sofia Fomina, Andreas Schager, Alan Held	Marek Janowski, MDR Rundfunkchor, Leipzig, Frankfurt Radio Symphony	CD: Pentatone; Cat: PTC5186788

== Derivative works ==
=== Classical music ===
- Franz Liszt wrote a piano transcription of the overture in 1846 (S.575).
- In 2021, the Leipzig-based publisher Edition Peters released a chamber ensemble arrangement (for 9 instruments) of the overture to Der Freischütz, arranged by Germán García Vargas.
- Carolus Arnoldus Craeyvanger wrote an introduction and variations on a theme from Der Freischütz for guitar in c. 1851.
- Stephen Heller composed 4 piano études on the Freischütz themes (Op. 127)
- Sigismond Thalberg included an arrangement of the duet "Schelm, halt fest!" (Ännchen and Agathe) in his L'art du chant appliqué au piano (Op.70).

=== Fine arts ===
- Austrian artist Matthias Laurenz Gräff painted a triptych Der Freischütz – Eros, Pathos, Agape in his series Garser Wein 2014. Further information Commons:Category:Garser Wein.
