= Carl Borromäus von Miltitz =

German composer and writer (1781–1845)

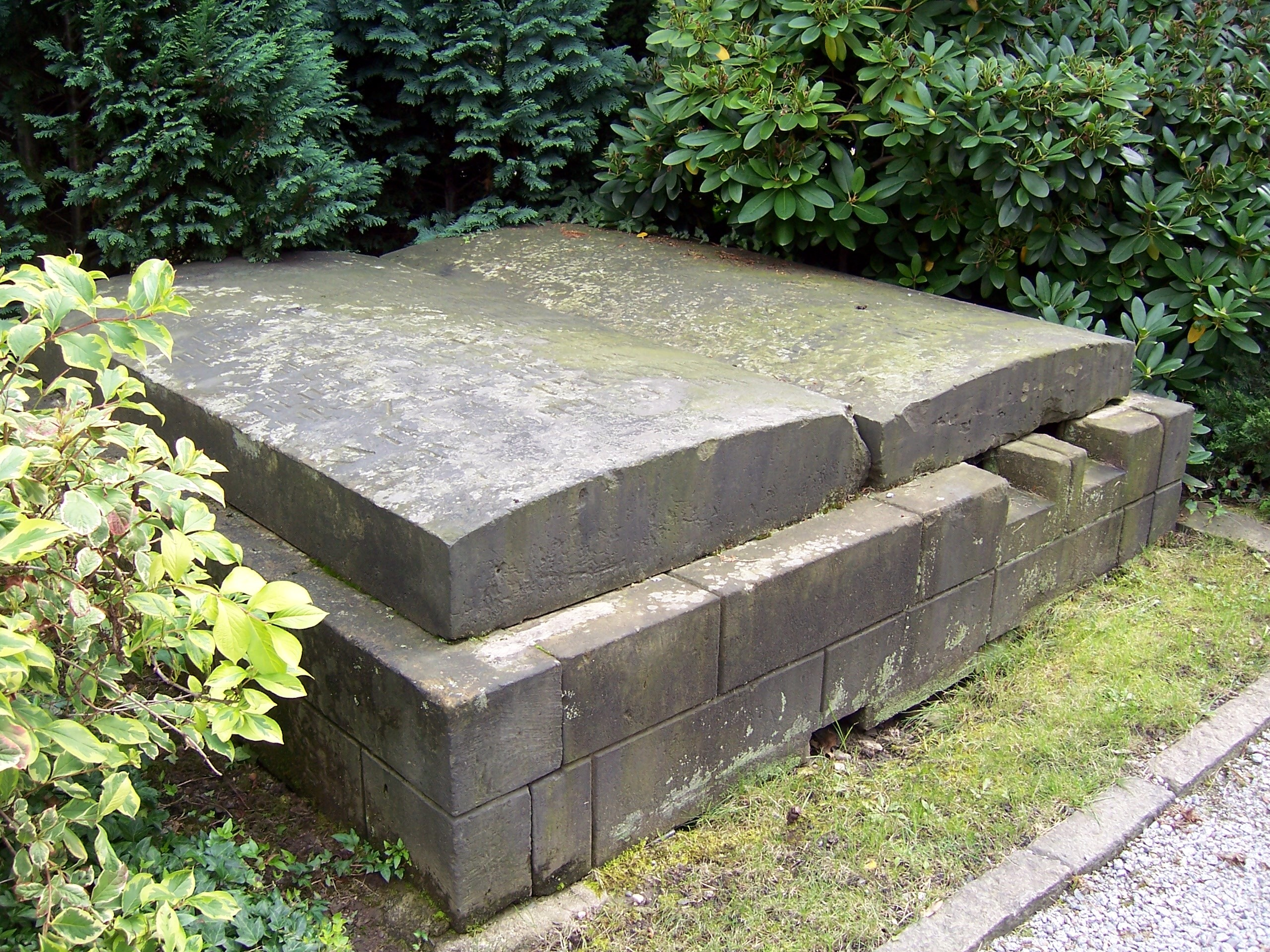
Grave of poet and composer Karl Borromäus von Miltitz at the Alter Katholischer Friedhof in Dresden.

Carl Borromäus von Miltitz (German: Karl Borromäus von Miltitz; 9 November 1781 – 19 January 1845) was a German composer, poet, and short story writer.

== Life ==
Miltitz was born in Dresden on 9 November 1781.

He held a literary circle at his ancestral castle Schloss Scharfenberg for about six years from 1811, with several leading writers of the time, including Novalis, Christian Gottfried Körner, Friedrich de la Motte Fouqué, Johann August Apel and E. T. A. Hoffmann. He was also a patron of artists, several of whom were commissioned to paint the castle, such as Ernst Ferdinand Oehme, Thomas Fearnley, Johan Christian Clausen Dahl and Caspar David Friedrich.

In 1823‚ he dined with American diplomat and writer Washington Irving in Dresden.

Miltitz' brother Alexander was ambassador to Constantinople, and wrote a highly regarded book, The Manual of Consuls.

== Works ==
Operas

- Saul
- Czerny Georg

Incidental music

- The Bride of Messina unpublished overture (1838)

Lied

- "Erlkönig" Lied based on the poem (1835)

Short stories

- "Der Bergmönch" ('The Mountain Monk') in Wunderbuch (volume 3, 1817)
- "Muhme Bleich" ('Aunt Pale') in Wunderbuch (volume 3, 1817)
- "Friedbert" ('Friedbert') in Wunderbuch (volume 3, 1817)
- "Die zwölf Nächte" ('The Twelve Nights') in Aus der Geisterwelt (volume 1, 1818)
- "Die Todtenrache" ('The Revenge of the Dead') in Aus der Geisterwelt (volume 2, 1818)
