= Sequestration =

Sequestration or sequester may refer to:

== Law and government ==
- Sequestration (law), the seizure of property for creditors or the state. See also Committee for Compounding with Delinquents
- Jury sequestration, the isolation of a jury
- Bankruptcy, in Scottish law
- Budget sequestration, U.S. legal procedure in which automatic spending cuts are triggered
  - Budget sequestration in 2013, automatic spending cuts to the U.S. federal budget beginning in 2013
- A euphemism for asset forfeiture by the state

== Science ==
- Carbon sequestration
- Biological processes in which an organism accumulates a compound or tissue:
  - Bile acid sequestrant
  - Pulmonary sequestration
  - Pyrrolizidine alkaloid sequestration
- Chelation, bonding between a polydentate ligand and a central atom

== Other uses ==
- Sequester (band)
- Sequestered (TV series), a Crackle television series
- Vibius Sequester, (4th or 5th century), Roman geographer
- Protective sequestration, a public health measure

== See also ==
- Sequestrant, a food additive which improves the quality and stability of foods
