= Erlkönig =

Poem by Johann Wolfgang von Goethe

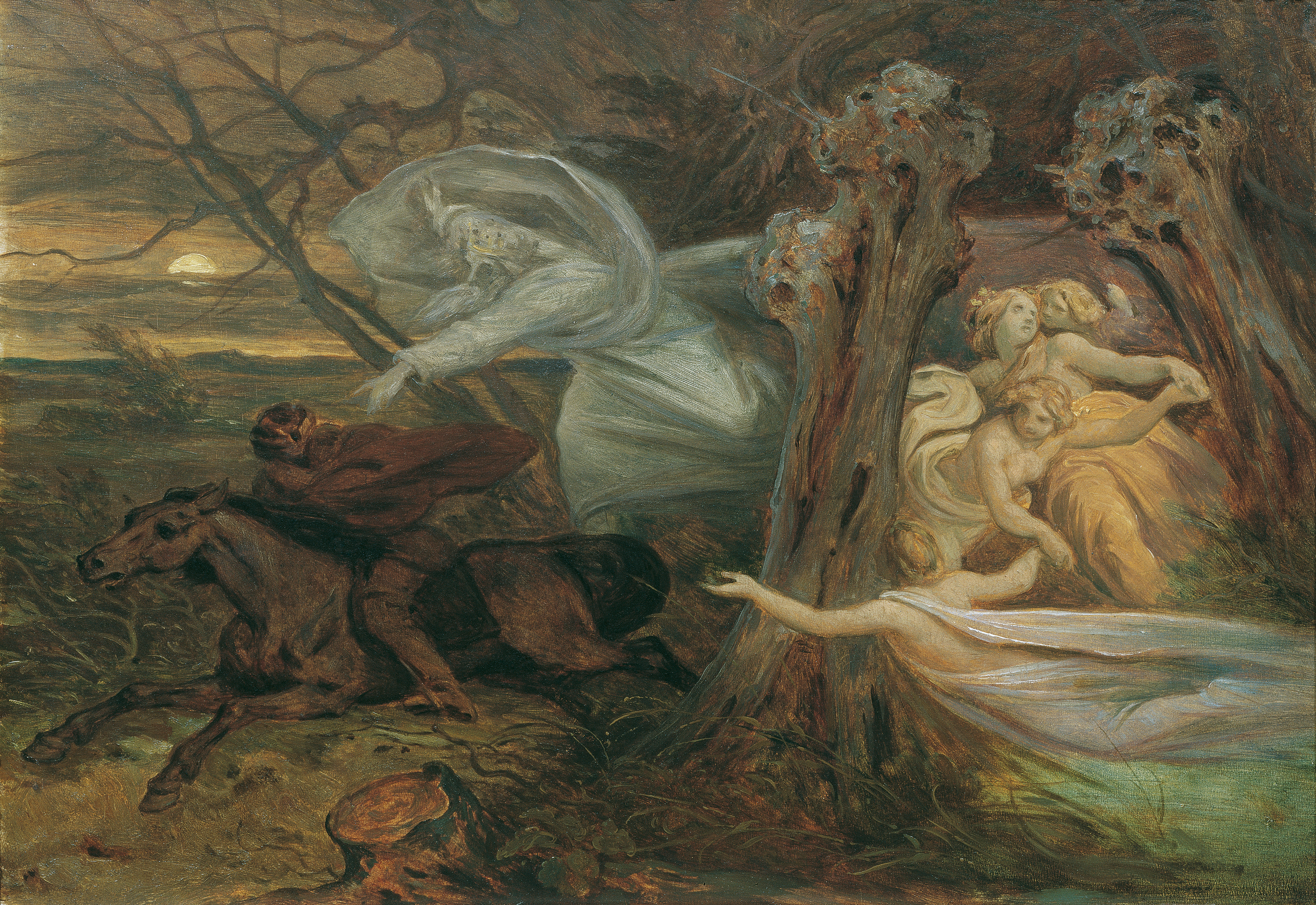
"Erlkönig" painting, Moritz von Schwind

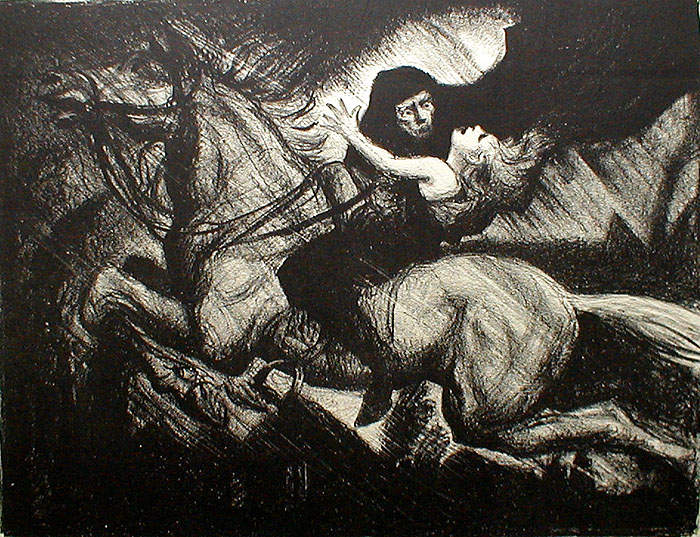
The Erlking by Albert Sterner, ca. 1910

"Erlkönig" (German pronunciation: [ˈɛʁlkøːnɪç]) is a poem by Johann Wolfgang von Goethe. It depicts the death of a child assailed by a supernatural being, the Erlking, a king of the fairies. It was originally written by Goethe as part of a 1782 Singspiel, Die Fischerin.

"Erlkönig" has been called Goethe's "most famous ballad". The poem has been set to music by several composers, most notably by Franz Schubert.

== Summary ==
An anxious young boy is being carried at night by his father on horseback. To where is not spelled out; German Hof has a rather broad meaning of "yard", "courtyard", "farm", or "(royal) court". The opening line tells that the time is late and that it is windy.

As the poem unfolds, the son claims to see and hear the "Erlkönig" (Erl-King). His father states he cannot see or hear the creature, and he attempts to comfort his son, asserting natural explanations for what the child sees – a wisp of fog, rustling leaves, shimmering willows.

The Erl-King attempts to lure the child into joining him, promising amusement, rich clothes, and the attentions of his daughters. Finally, the Erl-King declares that he will take the child by force. The boy shrieks that he has been attacked, spurring the father to ride faster to the Hof. Upon reaching the destination, the child is already dead.

== Text ==
Wer reitet so spät durch Nacht und Wind?
Es ist der Vater mit seinem Kind;
Er hat den Knaben wohl in dem Arm,
Er faßt ihn sicher, er hält ihn warm.

Mein Sohn, was birgst du so bang dein Gesicht?
Siehst, Vater, du den Erlkönig nicht?
Den Erlenkönig mit Kron' und Schweif?
Mein Sohn, es ist ein Nebelstreif.

"Du liebes Kind, komm, geh mit mir!
Gar schöne Spiele spiel' ich mit dir;
Manch' bunte Blumen sind an dem Strand,
Meine Mutter hat manch gülden Gewand."

Mein Vater, mein Vater, und hörest du nicht,
Was Erlenkönig mir leise verspricht?
Sei ruhig, bleibe ruhig, mein Kind;
In dürren Blättern säuselt der Wind.

"Willst, feiner Knabe, du mit mir gehn?
Meine Töchter sollen dich warten schön;
Meine Töchter führen den nächtlichen Reihn,
Und wiegen und tanzen und singen dich ein."

Mein Vater, mein Vater, und siehst du nicht dort
Erlkönigs Töchter am düstern Ort?
Mein Sohn, mein Sohn, ich seh' es genau:
Es scheinen die alten Weiden so grau.

"Ich liebe dich, mich reizt deine schöne Gestalt;
Und bist du nicht willig, so brauch' ich Gewalt."
Mein Vater, mein Vater, jetzt faßt er mich an!
Erlkönig hat mir ein Leids getan!

Dem Vater grauset's; er reitet geschwind,
Er hält in den Armen das ächzende Kind,
Erreicht den Hof mit Mühe und Not;
In seinen Armen, das Kind war tot.

Literal translation

Who rides, so late, through night and wind?
It is the father with his child.
He has the boy well in his arm,
He holds him safely, he keeps him warm.

My son, why do you hide your face in fear?
Father, do you not see the Erl-King?
The Erl-King with crown and cape?
My son, it is a streak of fog.

"You dear child, come, go with me!
(Very) beautiful games, I play with you;
Many colourful flowers are on the beach,
My mother has many a golden robe."

My father, my father, and do you not hear
What the Erl-King quietly promises me?
Be calm, stay calm, my child;
Through dry leaves, the wind is sighing.

"Do you, fine boy, want to go with me?
My daughters shall wait on you finely;
My daughters lead the nightly dance,
And rock and dance and sing you to sleep."

My father, my father, and don't you see there
The Erl-King's daughters in the gloomy place?
My son, my son, I see it clearly:
There shimmer the old willows so grey.

"I love you, your beautiful form excites me;
And if you're not willing, then I will use force."
My father, my father, he's grabbing me now!
The Erl-King has done me harm!

The father is horrified; he swiftly rides on,
He holds the moaning child in his arms,
Reaches the farm with great difficulty;
In his arms, the child was dead.

Edgar Alfred Bowring's translation

Who rides there so late through the night dark and drear?
The father it is, with his infant so dear;
He holdeth the boy tightly clasp'd in his arm,
He holdeth him safely, he keepeth him warm.

My son, wherefore seek'st thou thy face thus to hide?
Look, father, the Erl-King is close by our side!
Dost see not the Erl-King, with crown and with train?
My son, 'tis the mist rising over the plain.

"Oh, come, thou dear infant! oh come thou with me!
For many a game, I will play there with thee;
On my strand, lovely flowers their blossoms unfold,
My mother shall grace thee with garments of gold."

My father, my father, and dost thou not hear
The words that the Erl-King now breathes in mine ear?
Be calm, dearest child, 'tis thy fancy deceives;
'Tis the sad wind that sighs through the withering leaves.

"Wilt go, then, dear infant, wilt go with me there?
My daughters shall tend thee with sisterly care;
My daughters by night their glad festival keep,
They'll dance thee, and rock thee, and sing thee to sleep."

My father, my father, and dost thou not see,
How the Erl-King his daughters has brought here for me?
My darling, my darling, I see it aright,
'Tis the aged grey willows deceiving thy sight.

"I love thee, I'm charm'd by thy beauty, dear boy!
And if thou'rt unwilling, then force I'll employ."
My father, my father, he seizes me fast,
For sorely, the Erl-King has hurt me at last.

The father now gallops, with terror half wild,
He grasps in his arms the poor shuddering child;
He reaches his courtyard with toil and with dread,
The child in his arms finds he motionless, dead.

== The legend ==
The story of the Erlkönig derives from the traditional Danish ballad Elveskud: Goethe's poem was inspired by Johann Gottfried Herder's translation of a variant of the ballad (Danmarks gamle Folkeviser 47B, from Peter Syv's 1695 edition) into German as Erlkönigs Tochter ("The Erl-King's Daughter") in his collection of folk songs, Stimmen der Völker in Liedern (published 1778). Goethe's poem then took on a life of its own, inspiring the Romantic concept of the Erlking. Niels Gade's cantata Elverskud, Op. 30 (1854, text by Chr. K. F. Molbech) was published in translation as Erlkönigs Tochter.

In the original Scandinavian version of the tale, the antagonist was the Erlkönig's daughter rather than the Erlkönig himself.

== Settings to music ==
The poem has often been set to music, with Franz Schubert's rendition, his Opus 1 (D. 328), being the best known. Probably the next-best known is that of Carl Loewe (1818). Other notable settings are by members of Goethe's circle, including actress Corona Schröter (1782), Andreas Romberg (1793), Johann Friedrich Reichardt (1794), and Carl Friedrich Zelter (1797). Ludwig van Beethoven attempted to set it to music, but abandoned the effort; his sketch, however, was full enough to be published in a completion by Reinhold Becker (1897). A few other 19th-century versions are those by Václav Tomášek (1815), Carl Borromäus von Miltitz (1835), and Louis Spohr (1856, with obbligato violin; Op. 154 No. 4), Emilie Mayer (1870), and Heinrich Wilhelm Ernst (Polyphonic Studies for Solo Violin), though his was essentially a transcription of Schubert's version for solo violin. Twenty-first-century examples are pianist Marc-André Hamelin's "Etude No. 8 (after Goethe)" for solo piano, based on "Erlkönig". Neue Deutsche Härte band Rammstein, inspired by the motifs in this poem, created their song "Dalai Lama" for their 2004 album Reise, Reise. The poem has also been depicted by industrial metal band KMFDM in their song "Erlkönig" from the 2024 album Let Go.

=== Franz Schubert composition ===
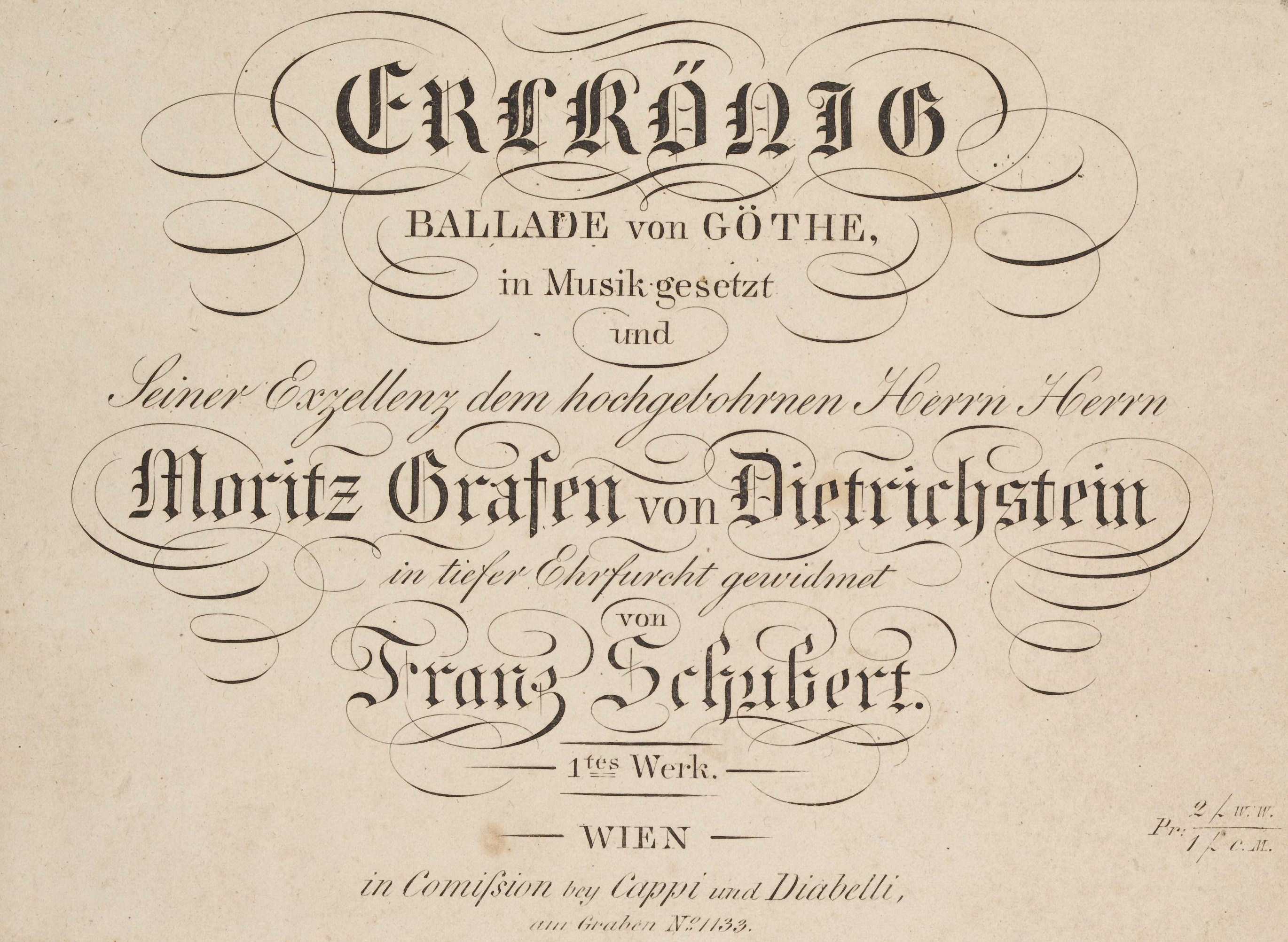
Title page of the first edition of Schubert's "Erlkönig"

Franz Schubert composed his Lied "Erlkönig" for solo voice and piano at the age of 17 or 18 in 1815, setting text from Goethe's poem. The work was first performed in concert on 1 December 1820 at a private gathering in Vienna. The public premiere on 7 March 1821 at the Theater am Kärntnertor was a great success, and he quickly rose to fame among the composers in Vienna. It is one of Schubert's most famous works, with enduring popularity and acclaim since its premiere in 1821.

=== Carl Loewe composition ===
Carl Loewe's setting was published as Op. 1, No. 3 and composed in 1817–18, in the lifetime of the poem's author and also of Schubert, whose version Loewe did not then know. Collected with it were Op. 1, No. 1, "Edward" (1818; a translation of the Scottish ballad), and No. 2, "Der Wirthin Töchterlein" (1823; "The Innkeeper's Daughter"), a poem of Ludwig Uhland. Inspired by a German translation of Scottish border ballads, Loewe set several poems with an elvish theme; but although all three of Op. 1 are concerned with untimely death, in this set only the "Erlkönig" has the supernatural element.

Loewe's accompaniment is in semiquaver groups of six in 9/8 time and marked Geschwind (fast). The vocal line evokes the galloping effect by repeated figures of crotchet and quaver, or sometimes three quavers, overlying the binary tremolo of the semiquavers in the piano. In addition to an unusual sense of motion, this creates a flexible template for the stresses in the words to fall correctly within the rhythmic structure.

Loewe's version is less melodic than Schubert's, with an insistent, repetitive harmonic structure between the opening minor key and answering phrases in the major key of the dominant, which have a stark quality owing to their unusual relationship to the home key. The narrator's phrases are echoed by the voices of father and son, the father taking up the deeper, rising phrase, and the son a lightly undulating, answering theme around the dominant fifth. These two themes also evoke the rising and moaning of the wind.

The Erl-King, who is always heard pianissimo, does not sing melodies, but instead delivers insubstantial rising arpeggios that outline a single major chord (that of the home key) which sounds simultaneously on the piano in una corda tremolo. Only with his final threatening word, "Gewalt", does he depart from this chord. Loewe's implication is that the Erlking has no substance but merely exists in the child's feverish imagination. As the piece progresses, the first in the groups of three quavers is dotted to create a breathless pace, which then forms a bass figure in the piano driving through to the final crisis. The last words, war tot, leap from the lower dominant to the sharpened third of the home key; this time not to the major but to a diminished chord, which settles chromatically through the home key in the major and then to the minor.

== See also ==
- List of works based on Erlkönig
