= Sequester (band) =

Canadian musical group

- Origin: Victoria, British Columbia, Canada
- Genres: Progressive metal, progressive rock, heavy metal, power metal, thrash metal, folk metal
- Years active: 2005–present
- Label: Independent
- Members: Ryan Boc
- Website: sequester.ca

Sequester is a Canadian heavy metal project created by Ryan Boc in 2005. Ryan Boc remains the sole member, writing and performing all of the material thus far. The music also draws inspiration from other genres such as progressive and psychedelic rock, traditional English and Scottish folk, grunge, alternative rock, blues, jazz, and classical. Common lyrical themes include fantasy, history, folklore, mythology, human nature, and spirituality; they are sung in a clean voice but often with thrashy, more aggressive overtones. The songs are usually polyphonic, long in duration due to complex structuring and arrangement, and frequently contain harmonized vocal and guitar layering.

== Members ==
- Ryan Boc – vocals, guitar, bass, drums and keyboard

== Guest musicians ==
- Kelli Gose – background vocals on the demo version of Homeland from Visions of the Erlking.

== Discography ==
- Visions of the Erlking (Demo) – 2007
- Winter Shadows – 2008
- Nameless One (EP) – 2009
- Shaping Life and Soul – 2011
- Ancestry (EP) – 2012
- Missing Image – 2014
- Hermit – 2018
- Cosmic Considerations – 2024

== Artwork ==
- The Sequester logo was designed by Andre Guillemette, a Canadian graphic designer notable for working with both Savage Circus and Dark Empire

Cover Art:

- Visions of the Erlking, Winter Shadows, and Shaping Life and Soul featured digital artwork by Ryan Boc.
- Nameless One was drawn by American artist Jonathan Elliott.
- Ancestry was painted by Ryan's friend and neighbour, Rachel Jackson.
