= Friedrich Laun =

German novelist

Friedrich August Schulze
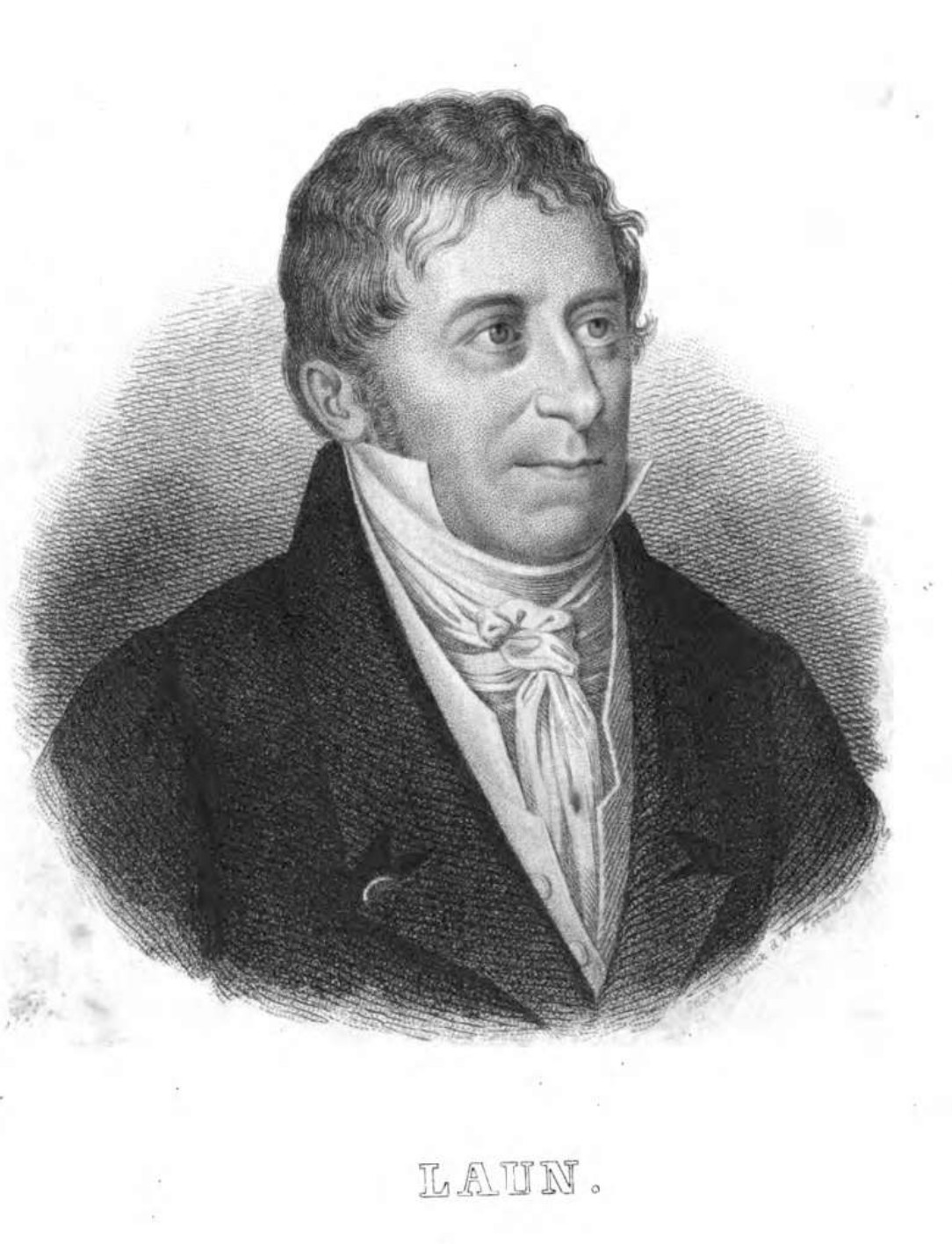
- Born: 1 June 1770
- Died: 4 September 1849 (aged 79)
- Writing career
- Pen name: Friedrich Laun
- Genre: novel
- Notable work: Der Mann, auf Freiersfüssen

Friedrich August Schulze (1 June 1770 – 4 September 1849) was a German novelist, who wrote under the pen name Friedrich Laun. Schulze was born in Dresden. His first novel, Der Mann, auf Freiersfüssen (1801), was favorably received. He wrote many volumes, and with August Apel edited a ghost story anthology, Gespensterbuch ("Book of Ghosts"; 1810–1815). Thomas De Quincey, who translated several of Laun's stories into English, noted his "great popularity" and opined, "the unelaborate narratives of Laun are mines of what is called Fun".
