= Johann Georg Theodor Grässe =

German bibliographer and literary historian

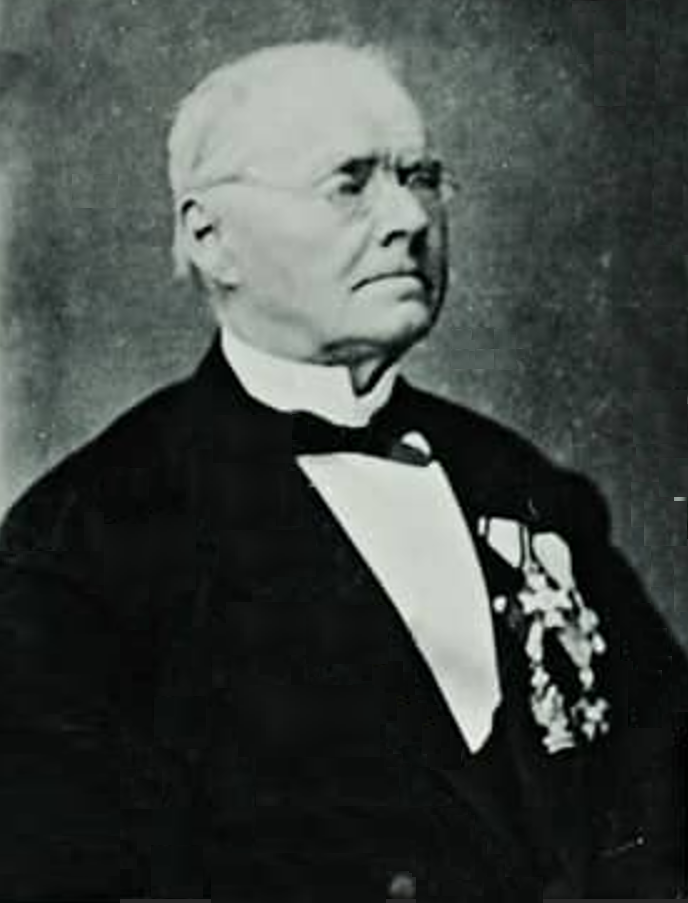
Johann Georg Theodor Grässe, ca. 1880.

Johann Georg Theodor Grässe (also Graesse; 31 January 1814 – 27 August 1885) was a German bibliographer and literary historian. He worked in Dresden at the Münzkabinett and also edited the journal Zeitschrift für Museologie und Antiquitätenkunde. He was born in Grimma and died in Niederlössnitz.

== Works ==
- Lehrbuch einer allgemeinen Literärgeschichte aller bekannten Völker der Welt [Textbook of general literary history of all known peoples of the world] (in German). Dresden and Leipzig. 1837–1860.
- Gesta Romanorum (Dresden, 1842)
- Bibliotheca magica (Leipzig, 1843)
- Handbuch der allgemeinen Litteraturgeschichte (Dresden, 1844-50); 2nd ed.
- Bibliotheca psychologica (1845)
- Legenda aurea des Jacobus de Voragine (1846)
- Die Sage vom Ritter Tannhäuser (1846)
- Geschichte der Poesie Europas und der bedeutendsten außreuropïschen Länder vom Anfang des 16. Jahrhunderts bis auf die neueuste Zeit (1848)
- Leitfaden der allgemeinen Literaturgeschichte (Leipzig, 1854)
- Sagenschatz des Königreichs Sachsen (1855)
- Sachsens Fürsten in Bildern mit geschichtlichen Erläuterungen. (Dresden, 1856)
- With Peter Christen Asbjörnsen: Nord und Süd. Ein Märchen-Strauß (Dresden, 1858)
- Trésor de livres rares et précieux [Treasury of rare and valuable books]. Nouveau dictionnaire bibliographique (in French). Dresden. 1859–1869.
- Orbis Latinus (Dresden, 1861)
- Märchenwelt. Verlag Moritz Schäfer (Leipzig, 1865)
- Sagenbuch des preußischen Staats (Dresden, 1866–71)
- Beschreibender Katalog der königlichen Porzellansammlung (Dresden, 1874)
- Sachsens Fürsten aus dem Haus Wettin (1875)
- Geschlechts-, Namen- und Wappensagen des Adels deutscher Nation (Dresden, 1876)
- Beschreibender Katalog des Grünen Gewölbes (5th ed., 1881)
