= Johann Friedrich Kind =

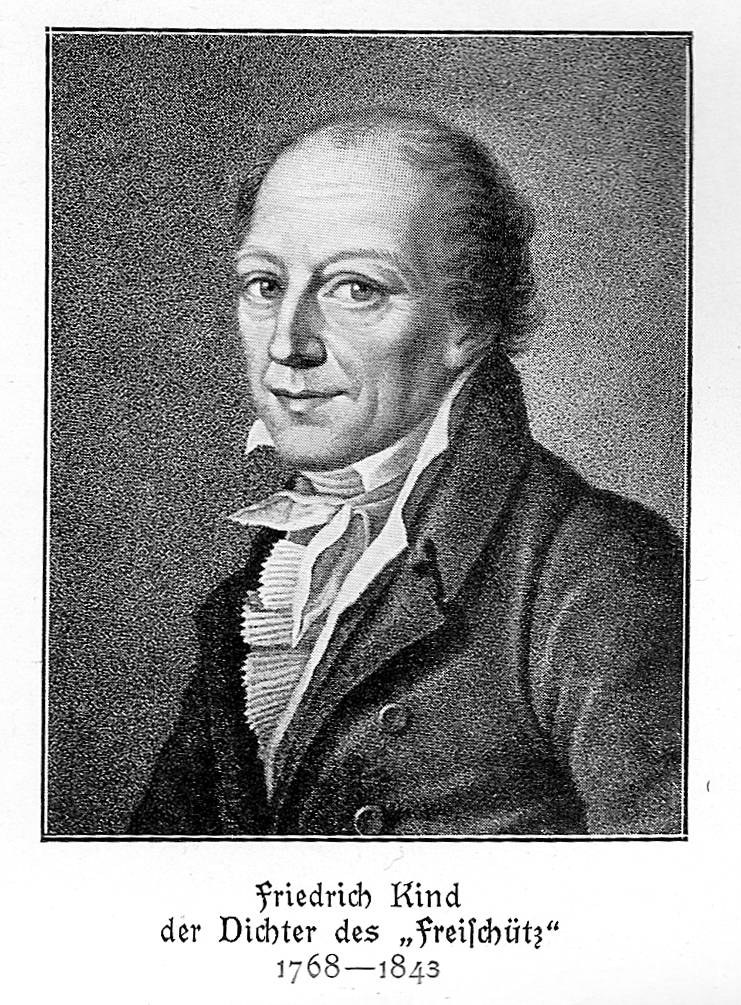
Johann Friedrich Kind.

Johann Friedrich Kind (4 March 1768, in Leipzig – 24 June 1843 in Dresden) was a German dramatist, most famous for writing the libretto for Carl Maria von Weber's opera Der Freischütz (1821).

== Biography ==
He studied law, and began his law practice in Dresden in 1793. In 1814, he abandoned his law practice to devote himself exclusively to literary work. He was a very industrious writer in many fields of literature, in all of which he was popular in his day with a large class of readers. With Winkler, he edited the Abendzeitung from 1817 to 1826. Though he published five volumes of sentimental and popular poetry, his poetry is the weakest of his literary efforts; the 1894 edition of the reputed Brockhaus encyclopedia critiqued it as being "smooth in form but without the least bit of originality." His popular tales have somewhat more merit than his poems; but it is in the line of operatic plays that he is best and most generally known.

== Libretti and plays ==
Besides Der Freischütz, he wrote the play Das Nachtlager von Granada (1818), which later became the model for Karl Johann Braun von Braunthal's libretto for Conradin Kreutzer's opera Das Nachtlager in Granada (1833). He also wrote Der Holzdieb (set to music by Heinrich Marschner).
