= Johann August Apel =

German writer and jurist (1771–1816)

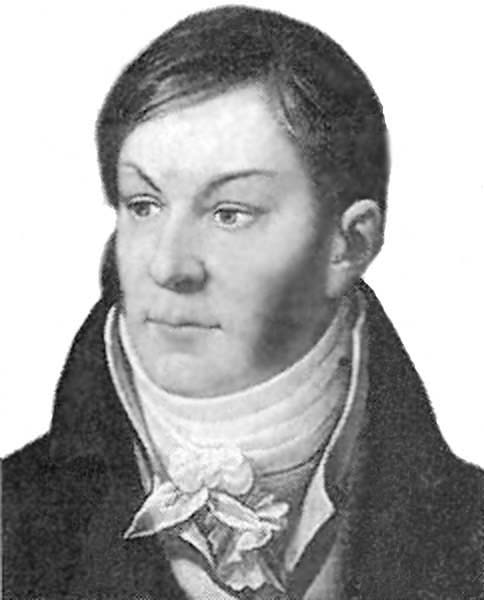
- Johann August Apel
- Born: 17 September 1771; Leipzig
- Died: 9 August 1816 (aged 44); Leipzig
- Occupation: Writer Jurist

Johann August Apel (17 September 1771 – 9 August 1816) was a German writer and jurist. Apel was born and died in Leipzig.

== Influence ==
"The Fatal Marksman" was Apel's version of the Freischütz folktale, and it was published as the first story of the first volume of his and Friedrich Laun's horror anthology Gespensterbuch (1810). Friedrich Kind and Carl Maria von Weber drew on this version as the main source for the story of their opera Der Freischütz (1821). On recommendation of Carl von Brühl they abandoned their working title Die Jägerbraut ('The Hunter's Bride') to the better known title of Apel's tale.

Two of his other short stories: "Die Bilder der Ahnen" ('The Paintings of the Ancestors') and "Die schwarze Kammer" ('The Black Chamber') were included in Jean-Baptiste Benoît Eyriès' Fantasmagoriana (1812), which was read by Lord Byron, Mary Shelley, Percy Bysshe Shelley, John William Polidori and Claire Clairmont at the Villa Diodati in Cologny, Switzerland during the Year Without a Summer, inspiring them to write their own ghost stories, including "The Vampyre" (1819), and Frankenstein (1823), which went on to shape the Gothic horror genre. "Die Bilder der Ahnen" (translated by Sarah Elizabeth Utterson in Tales of the Dead (1813) as "The Family Portraits") especially influenced Mary Shelley, who described it in her introduction to the 1831 edition of Frankenstein:

There was the tale of the sinful founder of his race, whose miserable doom it was to bestow the kiss of death on all the younger sons of his fated house, just when they reached the age of promise. His gigantic, shadowy form, clothed like the ghost in Hamlet, in complete armour, but with the beaver up, was seen at midnight, by the moon's fitful beams, to advance slowly along the gloomy avenue. The shape was lost beneath the shadow of the castle walls; but soon a gate swung back, a step was heard, the door of the chamber opened, and he advanced to the couch of the blooming youths, cradled in healthy sleep. Eternal sorrow sat upon his face as he bent down and kissed the forehead of the boys, who from that hour withered like flowers snapt upon the stalk. I have not seen these stories since then; but their incidents are as fresh in my mind as if I had read them yesterday.

== Works ==
=== Plays ===
- Polyïdos (1805)
- Die Aitolier (1806)
- Kalliroe (1806)
- Kunz von Kaufungen (1809)

=== Short story collections ===
- Cicaden (1810–1811)
- Gespensterbuch (1810–1815) with Friedrich Laun
- Wunderbuch volumes 1–2 (1815–1816) with Friedrich Laun
- Zeitlosen (1817)

=== Non-fiction ===
- Contributions to Allgemeine musikalische Zeitung (1800–1810)
- Contributions to Allgemeine Literatur-Zeitung (1802)
- Metrik (1814–1816)

=== Librettos ===
- Friedrich Schneider's Das Weltgericht (c. 1820)
