= Volksmärchen der Deutschen =

Collection of German literary fairy tales by Johann Karl August Musäus

Volksmärchen der Deutschen ('Folktales of the Germans'; original spelling: Volksmährchen der Deutschen) is an early collection of German folk stories retold in a satirical style by Johann Karl August Musäus, published in five volumes between 1782 and 1787. (Note: Many later sources say the first edition was published from 1782 to 1786, but the 1845 edition's "Editor's Introduction" says 1782 to 1787, and no edition of the fifth volume has been found with a date before 1787.)

== Stories ==
Volume	Year	Original title	Literal translation	First English translation
1	1782	"Die Bücher der Chronika der drey Schwestern"	'The Books of the Chronicles of the Three Sisters'	1791 (Note: English translations of "Die Bücher der Chronika der drey Schwestern" include: "The Books of the Chronicles of the Three Sisters" in Popular Tales of the Germans (1791); The Books of the Chronicles of the Three Sisters (c. 1830); The Three Sisters: A Story (1842); "The Three Sisters" in Select Popular Tales from the German of Musaeus (1845); "The Books of the Chronicles of the Three Sisters" in Legends of Rubezahl, and Other Tales (1845); The Enchanted Knights; or, the Chronicle of the Three Sisters (1845); The Arm! – the Sword! – and the Hour! Or, the Legend of the Enchanted Knights (1850); The Three Sons-in-law (1861); "The Chronicles of the Three Sisters" in Fairy Tales (1868); "The Story of Reinald, the Wonder-Child" in Wonder-World Stories (1877); "The Enchanted Forest" in Magic Casements: A Second Fairy Book (1907); The Chronicle of the Three Sisters (2025))
1	1782	"Richilde"	'Richilda'	1791 (Note: English translations of "Richilde" include: "Richilda; or, the Progress from Vanity to Vice" in Popular Tales of the Germans (1791); "Richilda" in Select Popular Tales from the German of Musaeus (1845))
1	1782	"Rolands Knappen"	'Roland's Squires'	1845 (Note: English translations of "Rolands Knappen" include: "Roland's Squires" in Select Popular Tales from the German of Musaeus (1845); Roland's Squires (1891))
2	1783	"Legenden von Rübezahl"	'Legends of Rübezahl'	1791 (Note: English translations of "Legenden von Rübezahl" include: "Elfin Freaks; or, the Seven Legends of Number-Nip" in Popular Tales of the Germans (1791); The Diverting History of Number Nip (1804), The Story of the Doctor of Smiedberg (1804), and The Journey to Carlsbad (1805); "The Gnome of the Hartz Mountains" in Endless Entertainment (1825); "The King of the Hartz" and "The King of the Hartz and the Tailor of Liebenau" in The Pocket Magazine (1827); "Rubezahl; or, The Mountain Spirit" in Legendary Tales, in Verse and Prose (1830); "Rubezahl" in the Ladies Companion and Literary Expositor (1837); "Honest Guy" and "The Adventures of the Countess Cecilia and the Mountain Spirit Numbernips" in The Annualette (1841); "Legends of Rübezahl" in Select Popular Tales from the German of Musaeus (1845); "Legends of Rubezahl" in Legends of Rubezahl, and Other Tales (1845); "A Legend of Ruebezahl, the Spirit of the Silesian Mountains" in the Universalist Union (1845); "Legend of the Turnip-Counter" in Hutchings' California Magazine (1859–1860); "The Origin and Nomenclature of Playing Cards" in The Art-Journal (1861); "Legends of Number Nip" in Legends of Number Nip (1863); The Spirit of the Giant Mountains (1864); "Rübezahl" in The Brown Fairy Book (1904); "How the Princess of Solesia Fooled the King of the Underworld" in The Greatest Adventure Stories Ever Told (1945))
2	1783	"Die Nymphe des Brunnens"	'The Nymph of the Spring'	1791 (Note: English translations of "Die Nymphe des Brunnens" include: "The Nymph of the Fountain" in Popular Tales of the Germans (1791); "The Nymph of the Fountain" in Select Popular Tales from the German of Musaeus (1845); "The Nymph of the Well" in The Nymph of the Well and The Barber's Ghost (1848); "The Nymph of the Well" in Magic Casements: A Second Fairy Book (1907))
3	1784	"Libussa"	'Libussa'	1827 (Note: English translations of "Libussa" include: "Libussa" in German Romance (1827); "Libussa" in Tales from the German (1844); "Libussa" in Libussa, Duchess of Bohemia; also The Man Without a Name (1852); "Libussa" in Spells of Enchantment: The Wondrous Fairy Tales of Western Culture (1991))
3	1784	"Der geraubte Schleier"	'The Stolen Veil'	1791 (Note: English translations of "Der geraubte Schleier" include: "The Stealing of the Veil; or, the Tale À La Montgolfier" in Popular Tales of the Germans (1791); "The Lost Veil; or, the Lake of the Swans" in Tales (1805); The Stolen Veil; or, the Tale à la Montgolfier (1850))
3	1784	"Liebestreue"	'Love-Loyalty'	
4	1786	"Stumme Liebe"	'Mute Love'	1813 (Note: English translations of "Stumme Liebe" include: "The Spectre-Barber" in Tales of the Dead (1813); "The Dumb Lover" in La Belle Assemblée (1814); "The Spectre Barber" in Popular Tales and Romances of the Northern Nations (1823); "The Dumb Lover" in The German Novelists (1826); "Dumb Love" in German Romance (1827); "The Grateful Ghost" in Royal Lady's Magazine (1831); "The Spectre Barber" in The Decameron of the West (1839); "Mute Love" in Select Popular Tales from the German of Musaeus (1845); "The Barber's Ghost" in The Nymph of the Well and The Barber's Ghost (1848))
4	1786	"Ulrich mit dem Bühel"	'Ulrich with the Hump'	1845 (Note: English translations of "Ulrich mit dem Bühel" include: "The Hen with the Golden Eggs" in Legends of Rubezahl, and Other Tales (1845))
4	1786	"Dämon Amor"	'Demon Cupid'	1845 (Note: English translations of "Dämon Amor" include: "The Demon of the Ring" in The Enchanted Knights; or, the Chronicle of the Three Sisters (1845))
5	1787	"Melechsala"	'Melechsala'	1805 (Note: English translations of "Melechsala" include: "Melechsala; or, the Language of Flowers" in Tales (1805); "Melechsala" in German Romance (1827); "Legendary Tale of the Graf von Gleichen" in Rambles and Researches in Thuringian Saxony (1842); Melechsala (1848))
5	1787	"Der Schazgräber"	'The Treasure Seeker'	1823 (Note: English translations of "Der Schazgräber" include: "The Treasure-Seeker" in Popular Tales and Romances of the Northern Nations (1823); "Peter Block; or, The Treasure-Seeker of the Harz" in Select Popular Tales from the German of Musaeus (1845); "The Treasure Seeker" in The Crimson Fairy Book (1903))
5	1787	"Die Entführung"	'The Elopement'	1801 (Note: English translations of "Die Entführung" include: "The Elopement" in The German Museum (1801); "The Elopement" in The United States Review and Literary Gazette (1827); "The Elopement" in The Odd Volume: Second Series (1827); "The Elopement" in Sharpe's London Magazine (1846); "The Man Without a Name" in Libussa, Duchess of Bohemia; also The Man Without a Name (1852); The Elopement (1989))

== Publication and translation ==
Volksmärchen der Deutschen was first published in five volumes between 1782 and 1787 by C. W. Ettinger in Gotha, Thuringia. (Note: The first volume was published in 1782, the second in 1783, the third in 1784, the fourth in 1786, and the fifth in 1787.)

After Musäus's death in 1787, his widow requested Christoph Martin Wieland publish a re-edited version of the tales, which he did as Die deutschen Volksmährchen von Johann August Musäus (1804–1805). (Note: Wieland's re-edited edition was published by C. W. Ettinger in Gotha, in five volumes: the first in 1804, and the following volumes in 1805.)

It has been reprinted many other times in Germany, including 1787–8, 1795–8, 1912, 1965, and 1976.

An abridged version edited by Moritz Müller for children, illustrated by Hermann Vogel, was published in Stuttgart by Thienemann in 1887.

=== English translations ===
The first English translation was Popular Tales of the Germans (1791) by Thomas Beddoes, which contained five of the stories: "Richilda", "The Book of the Chronicles of the Three Sisters", "The Stealing of the Veil", "Elfin Freaks" ("Legenden von Rübezahl"), and "The Nymph of the Fountain". This book was published anonymously, and the translation was traditionally attributed to William Beckford. Other early translations include "The Elopement" in the magazine The German Museum (1801), (Note: "The Elopement" was published in volume 3 of The German Museum magazine in June 1801. It was reprinted in volume 4 of the first series of The Literary Magnet magazine in 1825, and again as "Lauenstein Castle!" with an illustration in volume 2 of The New Casket (1832).) and the "Legends of Rübezahl" published in three chapbooks by S. Fisher (1804–1805). (Note: S. Fisher printed three chapbooks, with illustrations drawn by William Marshall Craig and engraved by J. Nesbit: The Diverting History of Number Nip (1804) containing the first two of the "Legends of Rübezahl", The Story of the Doctor of Smiedberg (1804) containing the third and fourth legends, and The Journey to Carlsbad (1805) containing the fifth.)

In the early nineteenth century, some French translations of the Volksmärchen were translated into English. "The Lost Veil" and "Melechsala" were translated in Tales (1805) from Isabelle de Montolieu's Recueil de contes (1803), an abridged version of "The Spectre-Barber" ("Stumme Liebe") was translated in Tales of the Dead (1813) from Jean-Baptiste Benoît Eyriès's Fantasmagoriana (1812), and another abridged translation of "Stumme Liebe", by Isabelle de Montolieu, was translated as "The Dumb Lover" in La Belle Assemblée (1814).

A number of direct translations were published in the 1820s, as part of an increased British interest in German Romanticist literature. This included two stories in Popular Tales and Romances of the Northern Nations (1823), (Note: Popular Tales and Romances of the Northern Nations (1823) was translated anonymously, and published by John Henry Bohte. It included "The Treasure-Seeker", and "The Spectre Barber" ("Stumme Liebe").) one of the "Legends of Rübezahl" in Endless Entertainment (1825), (Note: "The Gnome of the Hartz Mountains", a translation of the second of the "Legends of Rübezahl", was published in issue 18 of the magazine Endless Entertainment in 1825. This translation was later reprinted in two parts with an illustration in the magazine Tales of All Nations, issues 19 November and 26 November 1836, and included when the magazine stories were republished as a book Tales of All Nations; or, Popular Legends and Romances (1848) by T. Allman.) one story in Thomas Roscoe's The German Novelists (1826), (Note: The German Novelists (1826) translated by Thomas Roscoe included "The Dumb Lover" ("Stumme Liebe") in volume 3.) "The Elopement" in The Odd Volume: Second Series (1827), (Note: The Misses Corbett's The Odd Volume: Second Series (1827) was published anonymously, and included a translation of "Die Entführung" as "The Elopement" with a waltz score inserted in the middle of the story. "The Elopement" was reprinted in Robert Seymour and Robert Cruikshank's Odd Volume (1835), with additional illustrations.) another translation of "The Elopement" in The United States Review and Literary Gazette (1827), (Note: "The Elopement" was published in volume 2 of The United States Review and Literary Gazette in June 1827. It was also published in Britain with an abridged introductory note in The Gentleman's Pocket Magazine (1827).) three stories in Thomas Carlyle's German Romance (1827), (Note: Thomas Carlyle's German Romance (1827) included "Dumb Love", "Libussa", and "Melechsala", and these were reprinted many times in various collections of Carlyle's work.) and two of the "Legends of Rübezahl" in The Pocket Magazine (1827). (Note: The first and second of the "Legends of Rübezahl" were translated as "The King of the Hartz" and "The King of the Hartz and the Tailor of Liebenau" in The Pocket Magazine (1827).) In the 1830s, Julia Emily Gordon completed an unpublished translation of The Books of the Chronicles of the Three Sisters, (Note: Julia Emily Gordon (as "J. E. G.") translated The Books of the Chronicles of the Three Sisters around 1830, for "J. H. A.", along with three poems by Friedrich Schiller, thirty watercolours, and one pen and ink drawing.) one of the "Legends of Rübezahl" was translated by Henry Fox Talbot in Legendary Tales, in Verse and Prose (1830), (Note: The second "Legend of Rübezahl" was translated as "Rubezahl; or, The Mountain Spirit" in Henry Fox Talbot's Legendary Tales, in Verse and Prose (1830).) new abridged translations of "The Spectre Barber" were published in the Royal Lady's Magazine (1831) (Note: Royal Lady's Magazine (July 1831) included a heavily abridged translation of "Stumme Liebe" as "The Grateful Ghost".) and The Decameron of the West (1839), (Note: Arthur Sinclair's The Decameron of the West (1839) included a heavily abridged translation of "The Spectre Barber".) and another of the "Legends of Rübezahl" was translated in the Ladies Companion and Literary Expositor (1837). (Note: The third of the "Legends of Rübezahl" was translated as "Rubezahl" by "S." in the Ladies Companion and Literary Expositor (1837).)

The 1840s saw a revival of interest in German traditions following the marriage of Queen Victoria to Prince Albert of Saxe-Coburg and Gotha in 1840, which may have led to the subsequent new translations of Musäus's work. This included two of the "Legends of Rübezahl" in The Annualette (1841), (Note: The third and fifth of the "Legends of Rübezahl" were translated anonymously as "Honest Guy" and "The Adventures of the Countess Cecilia and the Mountain Spirit Numbernips" in The Annualette (1841).) the "Legendary Tale of the Graf von Gleichen" (a partial translation of "Melechsala") in Rambles and Researches in Thuringian Saxony (1842), (Note: John Frederick Stanford's Rambles and Researches in Thuringian Saxony (1842) included a partial translation of "Melechsala", which he claimed was from an old manuscript.) The Three Sisters: A Story (1842), (Note: William Domville translated "Chronicles of the Three Sisters" for his son's private printing press, as The Three Sisters: A Story (1842).) "Libussa" in Tales from the German (1844), (Note: John Oxenford translated "Libussa" in Tales from the German (1844).) three stories in Legends of Rubezahl, and Other Tales (1845), (Note: Hazlitt's Holiday Library series, edited by William Hazlitt, included Legends of Rubezahl, and Other Tales (1845), published by Joseph Cundall, including "The Books of the Chronicles of the Three Sisters" (translated by Clara de Chatelain), "Legends of Rubezahl", and "The Hen with the Golden Eggs".) two in The Enchanted Knights; or The Chronicle of the Three Sisters (1845), (Note: An anonymous translation by A. Sagorski of "The Three Sisters" along with "The Demon of the Ring" ("Dämon Amor") was published by Hugh Cunningham as The Enchanted Knights; or The Chronicle of the Three Sisters (1845).) seven in Select Popular Tales from the German of Musaeus (1845), (Note: Select Popular Tales from the German of Musaeus (1845) was translated anonymously by Adolf Zytogorski as part of Burns' Fireside Library series, with remaindered copies later reissued by Edward Lumley. It contained "Mute Love", "The Nymph of the Fountain", "Peter Block" ("Der Schatzgräber"), "The Three Sisters", "Richilda", "Roland's Squires", and the first three of the "Legends of Rübezahl".) one of the "Legends of Rübezahl" by Caroline M. Sawyer in the Universalist Union (1845), (Note: The third of the "Legends of Rübezahl" was translated by Caroline M. Sawyer as "A Legend of Ruebezahl, the Spirit of the Silesian Mountains" in the Universalist Union (1845).) "The Elopement" in Sharpe's London Magazine (1846), (Note: "The Elopement" was translated anonymously, and published with an illustration in volume 2, issue 35 of Sharpe's London Magazine on 27 June 1846.) two in The Nymph of the Well and The Barber's Ghost (1848), (Note: Adolf Zytogorski published new translations of "Die Nymphe des Brunnens" and "Stumme Liebe" as The Nymph of the Well and The Barber's Ghost (1848) under the name Adolphus Zytogorski.) Melechsala (1848), (Note: Melechsala (1848) was a literal translation of "Melechsala" by W. S. M. E. that was privately printed by W. Thiselton in Ramsgate.) a light-hearted free verse poem version of the "Chronicles of the Three Sisters" as The Arm! – the Sword! – and the Hour! Or, the Legend of the Enchanted Knights (1850), (Note: M. G. Kennedy's The Arm! – the Sword! – and the Hour! Or, the Legend of the Enchanted Knights (1850) was a light-hearted free verse poem version of the "Chronicles of the Three Sisters".) The Stolen Veil; or, the Tale à la Montgolfier (1850), (Note: The Stolen Veil; or, the Tale à la Montgolfier (1850) was a literal translation of "The Stolen Veil" by W. S. M. E. that was privately printed by W. Thiselton in Ramsgate. Said by Bertram Dobell to be "a good rendering of Musäus' interesting story".) two in Libussa, Duchess of Bohemia; also The Man Without a Name (1852), (Note: Adolf Zytogorski translated "Libussa" and "Die Entführung" in Libussa, Duchess of Bohemia; also The Man Without a Name (1852) under the name Adolphus Zytogorski; this was reprinted under his assumed name J. T. Hanstein in 1858, 1863, and 1866.) and three of the "Legends of Rübezahl" in Hutchings' California Magazine (1859–1860). (Note: The first three of the "Legends of Rübezahl" were translated by P. F. Johnson as "Legend of the Turnip-Counter" in Hutchings' California Magazine (1859–1860).)

A number of new translations were published in the 1860s, including one of the "Legends of Rübezahl" in The Art-Journal (1861), (Note: The first of the "Legends of Rübezahl" was translated by William Bell as part of "The Origin and Nomenclature of Playing Cards" in The Art-Journal (1861).) The Three Sons-in-Law (1861), (Note: Augusta Frederika Frere's The Three Sons-in-Law (1861) was a free translation the "Chronicles of the Three Sisters".) Mark Lemon's Legends of Number Nip (1863), (Note: Mark Lemon's Legends of Number Nip (1863) was a revision of Beddoes' 1791 translation of the "Legends of Rübezahl".) all five of the "Legends of Rübezahl" in The Spirit of the Giant Mountains (1864), (Note: Mary Catherine Rowsell's The Spirit of the Giant Mountains (1864) was a collection of many Rübezahl stories from various sources, including the five from Volksmärchen der Deutschen.) and a new translation by Lemon of the "Chronicles of the Three Sisters" in Fairy Tales (1868). (Note: Mark Lemon's Fairy Tales (1868) included a new translation of the "Chronicles of the Three Sisters", illustrated by Charles Bennett.) A few more followed, such as one in Wonder-World Stories (1877), (Note: Marie Pabke and Margery Deane's translation of "Chronicles of the Three Sisters", "The Story of Reinald, the Wonder-Child" was published in Wonder-World Stories (1877), and reprinted in Alfred Henry Miles' Fifty-Two Fairy Tales (1892).) Harriet Pinckney Huse's Roland's Squires (1891), (Note: Harriet Pinckney Huse's Roland's Squires; A Legend of the Time of Charlemagne (1891) contained illustrations.) "The Treasure Seeker" in Andrew Lang's The Crimson Fairy Book (1903), (Note: Andrew Lang's The Crimson Fairy Book (1903) included "The Treasure Seeker" translated by Leonora Blanche Alleyne.) the first Volksmärchen Rübezahl tale in The Brown Fairy Book (1904), (Note: Andrew Lang's The Brown Fairy Book (1904) included "Rübezahl" translated by Leonora Blanche Alleyne and, attributed to "Volksmährchen der Deutschen".) two stories in Magic Casements: A Second Fairy Book (1907), (Note: Kate Douglas Wiggin and Nora Archibald Smith included translations of "Chronicles of the Three Sisters" as "The Enchanted Forest", and "The Nymph of the Well" in Magic Casements: A Second Fairy Book (1907).) and an abridged version of the first of the "Legends of Rübezahl" in The Greatest Adventure Stories Ever Told (1945). (Note: "How the Princess of Solesia Fooled the King of the Underworld", an abridged version of the first of the "Legends of Rübezahl", was included in Arnold Shaw's The Greatest Adventure Stories Ever Told (1945).)

More recently, Fritz Eichenberg adapted the first of the "Legends of Rübezahl" as Poor Troll (1983), Janet Ritch translated The Elopement (1989) for the Victoria University Library, (Note: Janet Ritch translated The Elopement (1989) as a hand made book given to Victoria University Library, handwritten by Lynda Hayes, with illustrations by Helen Elliott.) Jack Zipes translated "Libussa" in Spells of Enchantment: The Wondrous Fairy Tales of Western Culture (1991), Piri Korngold Nesselrod retold the five "Legends of Rübezahl" in Rübezahl: The Adventurous Mountain Spirit (1999), and Arthur J. Cropley translated The Chronicle of the Three Sisters (2025).
