= Julia Gordon =

Julia Gordon may refer to:

- Julia Gordon (mathematician), Canadian mathematician
- Julia Swayne Gordon (1878–1933), American actress
- Julia Emily Gordon (1810–1896), British painter and engraver
