= The Spectre-Barber =

- Short story by Johann Karl August Musäus

Text available at Wikisource
- Original title: Stumme Liebe
- Translator: Sarah Elizabeth Utterson; Thomas Roscoe; Thomas Carlyle; Arthur Sinclair; Adolf Zytogorski
- Language: German
- Genre: Satirical folk story

Publication
- Published in: Volksmärchen der Deutschen
- Publication date: 1786
- Published in English: 1813

"The Spectre-Barber" (German: Stumme Liebe: "Silent Love", also translated under the titles "Dumb Love", "The Dumb Lover", and "Mute Love") is a short story written by Johann Karl August Musäus, included in his satirical retellings of collected folk stories, Volksmärchen der Deutschen (1786). The story was translated into French by Jean-Baptiste Benoît Eyriès as part of his collection of German ghost-stories Fantasmagoriana (1812), which inspired Mary Shelley's Frankenstein (1818) and John William Polidori's "The Vampyre" (1816). This French translation was then partially translated into English in Tales of the Dead (1813), followed by more complete translations from the original German, such as those by Thomas Roscoe (1826) and Thomas Carlyle (1827), with a child-friendly abridged version being published in 1845.

== Plot ==
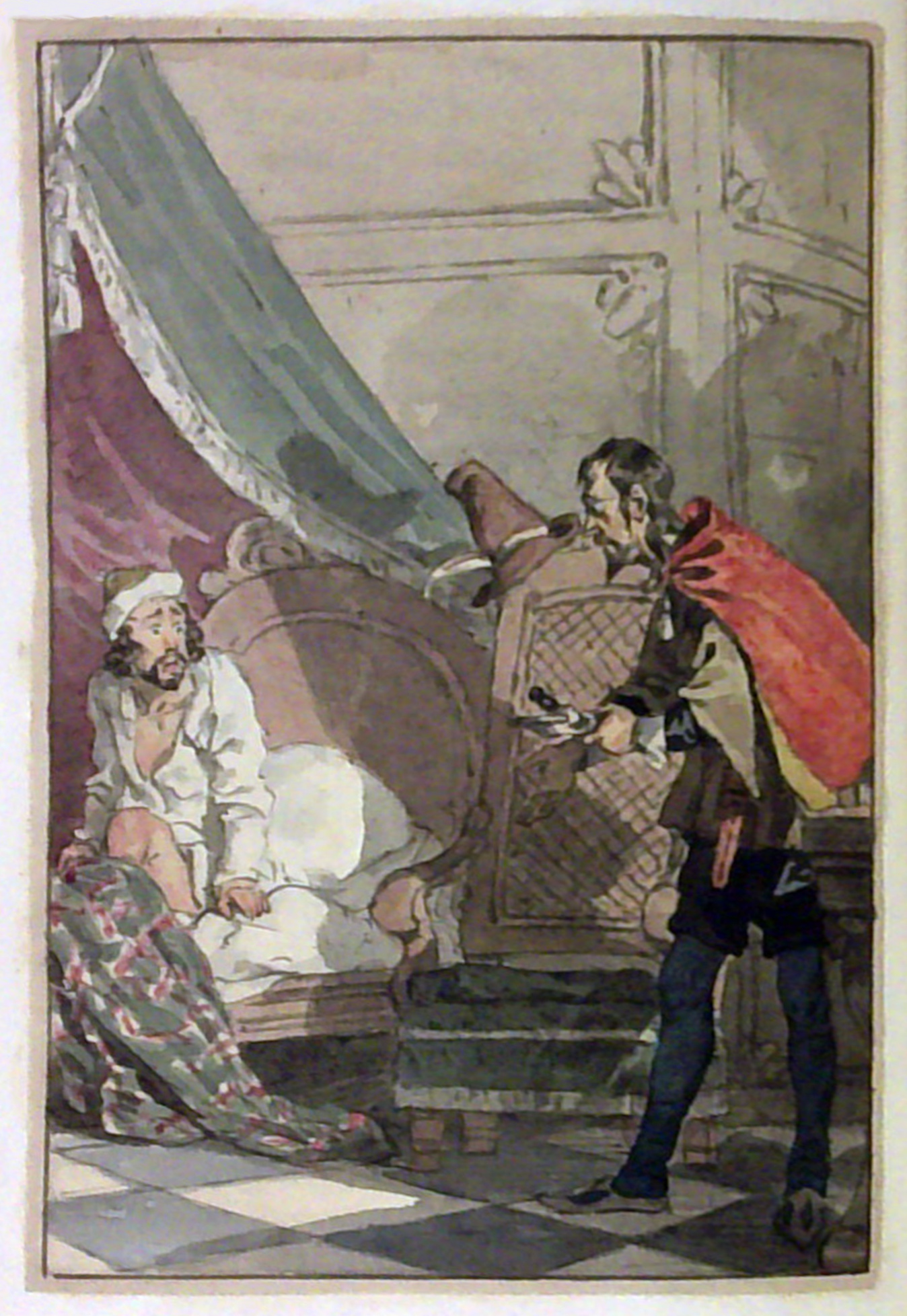
Unpublished illustration by Edward Vernon Utterson for Tales of the Dead

"The Spectre-Barber" is set in sixteenth-century Bremen. A wealthy merchant named Melchior dies suddenly and his son Franz (called François in Eyriès' translation, and Francis in Utterson's) inherits his father's wealth. Franz foolishly squanders his inheritance.

Franz spies a neighbour's daughter, a spinner named Meta, and falls in love with her. With an eye towards regaining fortune and earning Meta's hand in marriage, Franz sells his last possessions, purchases a horse, and sets out on a journey.

On his journey, Franz seeks shelter in a castle, despite rumours that the castle is haunted. In the middle of the night, Franz is awakened and sees the ghost of a barber sharpening his razors. The ghost motions to Franz, who complies and sits in front of the spectre. The spectre "placed the shaving-bib round his neck" and proceeds to remove all hair from Franz's head. Sensing that the spectre wants something, Franz "beckoned the phantom to seat himself in the chair", after which Franz shaves the spectre.

The ghost had been a barber during his life, whose lord would play "all sorts of malicious tricks" on strangers, including preparing a bath for guests, then having the barber shave guests beards and heads closely before suddenly throwing them out "with raillery and ridicule". One victim, a holy man, cursed the ghost to haunt the castle until someone "without being invited or constrained, shall do to you, what you have so long done to others".

In return for Franz having freed the ghost from the curse, the ghost tells Franz to return to Bremen at the Autumn equinox and wait for someone who will tell him what to do. At the appointed day, Franz meets a beggar who tells Franz of a dream in which an "angel stood at the foot of my bed" and told the beggar where to find buried treasure. Franz recognises the location from its description as a garden that had belonged to his father.

Franz re-purchases the garden and discovers the treasure. His fortune restored, Franz proposes marriage to Meta, who accepts.

== Development ==
Johann Karl August Musäus was an early collector of German folk and fairy stories. From 1782 he began to publish his most famous work Volksmärchen der Deutschen, in which he retold these stories in a satirical style. Within this, "The Spectre-Barber" belongs to the subgenre of Kunstmärchen ("art fairy-tales") which typically centres around a moral allegory, with any horrific elements only secondary to fulfilling that. The tale was inspired by a story told to him about a garden in Bremen's New Town by his niece Caroline Amalie Gildemeister (née Kotzebue), with whom he corresponded frequently. It was completed and published in volume four of Volksmärchen der Deutschen in 1786.

== Publication and translations ==
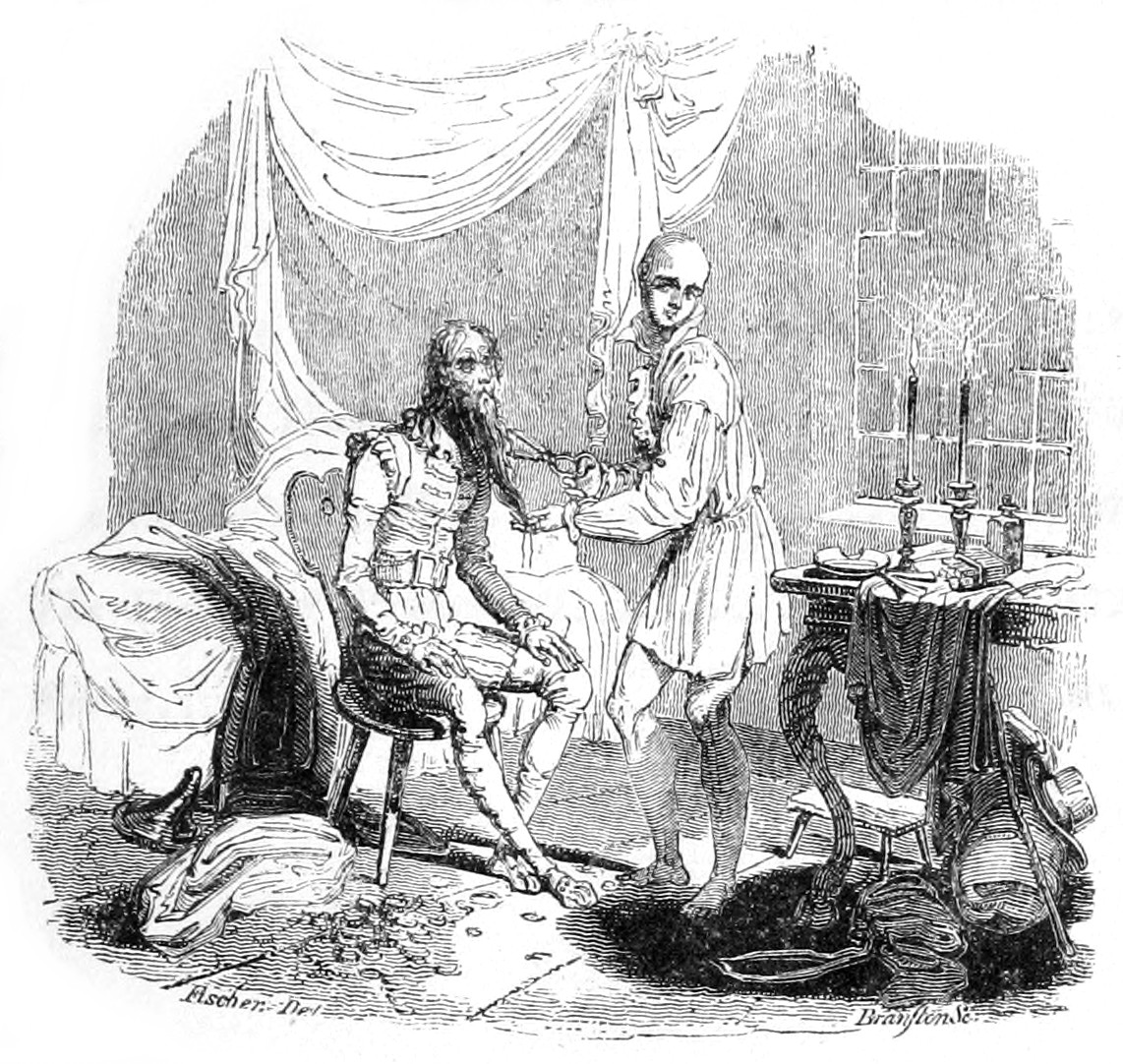
Illustration by John Fischer, engraved by Allen Robert Branston for Popular Tales and Romances of the Northern Nations

"The Spectre-Barber" was first published in 1786 in the fourth of the five volumes of Volksmärchen der Deutschen (1782–87). Volksmärchen der Deutschen was collected into a single volume in 1842, extensively illustrated by Ludwig Richter, and has been republished many times in Germany since then.

The story was translated anonymously into French by Jean-Baptiste Benoît Eyriès as "L'Amour Muet", the first story in his collection of German ghost-stories Fantasmagoriana (1812). An English translation of most of the stories from Fantasmagoriana, including "The Spectre-Barber", was published anonymously by Sarah Elizabeth Utterson as Tales of the Dead (1813). She gave this story the title "The Spectre-Barber", but abridged it "as it contained much matter relative to the loves of the hero and heroine, which in a compilation of this kind appeared rather misplaced".

More complete translations from the original German were produced in John Henry Bohte's Popular Tales and Romances of the Northern Nations (as "The Spectre Barber": vol 2, 1823), Thomas Roscoe's The German Novelists (as "The Dumb Lover": vol 3, 1826), and Thomas Carlyle's German Romance (as "Dumb Love": vol 1, 1827). A heavily abridged translation was published in Arthur Sinclair's The Decameron of the West (1839), though a review in The Athenaeum noted that Carlyle had already published a better translation. J. T. Hanstein's Select Popular Tales from the German of Musaeus (1845) included the story as "Mute Love", condensed and translated for a child audience. Academic translator Bayard Quincy Morgan regarded Carlyle's translations to be excellent, and literary scholar Joseph Warren Beach noted the "greater exactness" of Carlyle's version compared to Bohte's anonymous translation. An extract of Carlyle's translation, from the castle scene on, was published as "The Goblin Barber" in Charles Gibbon's The Casquet of Literature (vol 3, 1873), and included in other works such as Short Stories (vol 5, 1891).

== Reception and influence ==
"The Spectre-Barber" (as "L'Amour Muet") was the first story in the French collection of German ghost stories Fantasmagoriana (1812). This book was read by Lord Byron, Mary Shelley, Percy Bysshe Shelley, John William Polidori and Claire Clairmont at the Villa Diodati in Cologny, Switzerland during 1816, the Year Without a Summer, and inspired them to write their own ghost stories. Lord Byron wrote a fragment of a novel that is considered the first modern vampire story, Polidori wrote The Vampyre (1816) based on this, and Mary Shelley went on to write Frankenstein (1818); these books went on to shape the Gothic horror genre. Maximiliaan van Woudenberg examines what influence "L'Amour Muet" had on Frankenstein, and points out the "bedside apparition" motif occurs here as well as in several other of the Fantasmagoriana stories. He also comments on the "silent love" between Franz and Meta, which is paralleled by Victor and Elizabeth, that in both cases they cannot fully express their love until a quest is fulfilled, and the theme of isolation that this introduces. However, Brian Stableford notes that both Frankenstein and The Vampyre broke away from the horror-conventions of these stories. The authors attempted to get the same reaction of fear from readers, but shunned the tired motifs of lineage, family loyalty and inheritance, and instead replaced them with a highly charged and unsettling sexual subtext.

Walter Scott attributed his use of a phantom barber in his play The Doom of Devorgoil (1830) to this story, writing: "The story of the Ghostly Barber is told in many countries; but the best narrative founded on the passage, is the tale called Stumme Liebe, among the legends of Musæus. I think it has been introduced upon the English stage in some pantomime, which was one objection to bringing it upon the scene a second time."

"The Spectre-Barber" is also traced as the source of the "three times recurring dream" motif in Washington Irving's "Wolfert Webber" (from Tales of a Traveller, 1824) according to Walter Reichart.

Additionally a German opera, Arnelda, by Andreas Mohr with libretto by Otto Eick was based on "The Spectre-Barber", which was first performed in 1894 at the Würzburg Stadttheatre.

David Morse sees "The Spectre-Barber" as an allegory showing the difficulty of being an artist, but also how "the artistic sensibility can triumph in a world of recalcitrant fact". Laura Martin points out that Musäus was an Enlightenment rationalist, but is retelling folk superstitions; he uses humour at points in "Stumme Liebe" to debunk the need for magic, despite the supernatural elements preceding it, which makes any moral to the story and its purpose unclear. Martin also questions Musäus' tendency to turn presumably originally peasant characters, into bourgeois figures, such as Franz. David Blamires describes "The Spectre-Barber" as managing to "combine a sentimental love-story with the hero's hair-raising encounter with a ghost in a haunted castle, followed by a version of the dream of hidden treasure", claiming that these themes are "of dubious interest to children". He writes that satire was a clear part of Musäus' literary purpose, though this was "kept in check by his deeper devotion to the idyll of domestic harmony".
