= The Doom of Devorgoil =

1830 play by Sir Walter Scott

The Doom of Devorgoil is a play by Sir Walter Scott, initially written in 1817 and 1818, and then reworked in 1829 and 1830 for publication in the spring of 1830, together with another work titled Auchindrane in an octavo volume. The play was one of Scott's few critical failures.

== History ==
On April 26, 1829, after Scott had spent several days working on Anne of Geierstein, he sought to distract himself with something else. According to Scott's account:

Looking for something, I fell in with the little drama, long missing, called the Doom of Devorgoil. I believe it was out of mere contradiction that I sat down to read and correct it, merely because I would not be bound to do aught that seemed compulsory. So I scribbled at a piece of nonsense till two o'clock, and then walked to the lake. At night I flung helve after hatchet, and spent the evening in reading the Doom of Devorgoil to the girls, who seemed considerably interested. Anne objects to the mingling the goblinry, which is comic, with the serious, which is tragic. After all, I could greatly improve it, and it would not be a bad composition of that odd kind to some picnic receptacle of all things.

The play was written "for the purpose of obliging the late Mr. Terry, then Manager of the Adelphi Theatre, for whom the Author had a particular regard". However, it was not performed, because "[t]he manner in which the mimic goblins of Devorgoil are intermixed with the supernatural machinery, was found to be objectionable, and the production had other faults, which rendered it unfit for representation".

In April 1830, Scott further wrote of the play:

I have called the piece a Melodrama, for want of a better name; but, as I learn from the unquestionable authority of Mr. Colman's Random Records, that one species of the drama is termed an extravaganza, I am sorry I was not sooner aware of a more appropriate name than that which I had selected for Devorgoil.

The Author's Publishers thought it desirable, that the scenes, long condemned to oblivion, should be united to similar attempts of the same kind; and as he felt indifferent on the subject, they are printed in the same volume with Halidon Hill and MacDuff's Cross, and thrown off in a separate form, for the convenience of those who possess former editions of the Author's Poetical Works.

The general story of the Doom of Devorgoil is founded on an old Scottish tradition, the scene of which lies in Galloway. The crime supposed to have occasioned the misfortunes of this devoted house, is similar to that of a Lord Herries of Hoddam Castle, who is the principal personage of Mr. Charles Kirkpatrick Sharpe's interesting ballad, in the Minstrelsy of the Scottish Border, vol. iv. p. 307. In remorse for his crime, he built the singular monument called the Tower of Repentance. In many cases the Scottish superstitions allude to the fairies, or those who, for sins of a milder description, are permitted to wander with the "rout that never rest," as they were termed by Dr. Leyden. They imitate human labor and human amusements, but their toil is useless, and without any advantageous result; and their gayety is unsubstantial and hollow. The phantom of Lord Erick is supposed to be a spectre of this character.

The story of the Ghostly Barber is told in many countries; but the best narrative founded on the passage, is the tale called Stumme Liebe, among the legends of Musæus. I think it has been introduced upon the English stage in some pantomime, which was one objection to bringing it upon the scene a second time.

== Plot ==
The Edinburgh Literary Journal, in its review of the play, summarized the plot as follows:

Oswald of Devorgoil is a decayed Scottish baron, living in his solitary and ruinous castle on the Borders; be is married to a good sort of woman called Eleanor, and has a daughter Flora, and a niece Katleen, both residing with him. Leonard, a handsome young ranger, and Gullcrammer, a conceited divinity student, are admirers of Flora, who, of course, prefers the ranger. His friend and follower, Lancelot Blackthorn, is the lover of Katleen. She and Blackthorn disguise themselves as two mischievous spirits, and play off some foolish pranks on Gullcrammer, greatly to his discomfiture. The last scene introduces us to an old hall in the castle of Devorgoil. There is a prophecy, that, on the fiftieth year from the decease of one of Devorgoil's ancestors, who had committed several murders, his ghost will return, and the doom of the family be fulfilled. Accordingly, the time has now come. The spirit of Lord Erick enters, and, after terrifying all the family, strikes the wall and discovers the treasure chamber. But a heavy portcullis falls before the door and bars out all approach. The door, however, must be opened within an hour, else it is the decree of fate that the waters of the lake, which are already rising, will overwhelm the castle, This is a digitus vindice nodus, which, however, is not long of being solved, for the spirit of Lord Erick had obligingly taken an opportunity of giving the key of the treasure chamber to Katleen, who now hands it to Leonard, and he unlocks the door. The waters immediately recede, and the treasure remains. The family of Devorgoil is once more rich, and every body is happy.

== Reception ==
The play was poorly received, with the Edinburgh Literary Journal suggesting that Scott should have thrown both Doom of Devorgoil and Auchindrane into the fire rather than publishing them. The Journal reported that for both plays the plot was "exceedingly bare and meagre", and that Doom of Devorgoil was "in particular wofully deficient in interest", with a catastrophic event central to the plot "clumsily and abruptly brought about". The Journal further stated that "[n]one of the characters are well, or fully, drawn. The three females are positively disagreeable, for they are made to talk in a petulant and unbecoming manner, quite foreign to the gentleness usually belonging to their sex, and consequently effectually checking our interest in them".
