= Richilde (fairy tale) =

German fairy tale

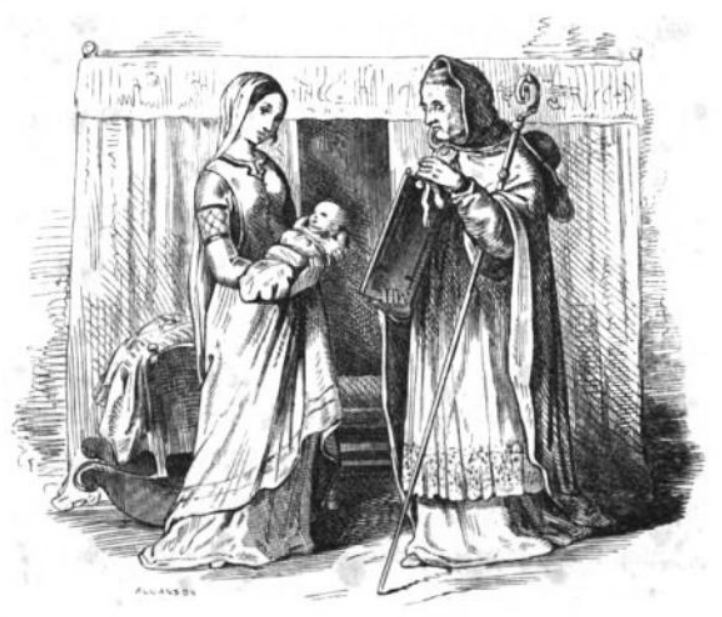
- The infant Richilde and Albertus Magnus

Folk tale
- Name: Richilde
- Aarne–Thompson grouping: 709
- Country: Germany
- Origin Date: 1782
- Related: Snow White

"Richilde" is a German literary fairy tale, written by Johann Karl August Musäus, published in 1782 in the first volume of his collection Volksmärchen der Deutschen ("Folktales of the Germans"). It is Aarne–Thompson type 709, Snow White, focused on the character of the wicked stepmother.

== Plot ==
In the time of the Crusades, the saint and reputed sorcerer Albertus Magnus aids the childless Count and Countess of Brabant in having a daughter, whom they name Richilde. As a gift for the child, Albertus Magnus creates a wonderful mirror which can show anything she desires if she says a rhyming chant. By the time Richilde is fifteen, she is an orphan and the new Countess. Her dying mother warned her to be virtuous and never use the mirror for frivolity, but Richilde grows curious about what others are saying about her and finally consults the mirror for the first time, asking it to show her "the fairest maid of Brabant's race." When it shows her own reflection, Richilde becomes arrogant.

With many noblemen vying for Richilde's hand in marriage, her governess tells her she has three days to choose one. Unable to decide, Richilde asks the mirror to show her the handsomest man in Brabant. It shows an image of a strange knight, and she falls instantly in love. However, to her disappointment, the man – Earl Gombald of Lowen – is already married. Rumors spread until Gombald hears about it. He has been contented in an arranged marriage to his cousin, but the rumors appeal to his own vanity. Wanting to pursue Richilde, he divorces his pregnant wife with the excuse that they are too closely related. He sends her to a nunnery, where she dies in childbirth. He arranges for the infant to be taken to one of his castles with servants and court dwarfs to attend her, but he is occupied with wooing Richilde, whom he soon marries. As time goes on, their marriage becomes troubled and Gombald eventually dies of the plague while on a pilgrimage.

Richilde observes the period of mourning, but enjoys the renewed attention of noblemen. She returns to the magic mirror to confirm that she's still the fairest, but is horrified when it shows a different woman: Gombald's daughter Blanca, now fifteen years old. Filled with rage and jealousy, Richilde calls for Sambul the Jewish court physician and orders him to poison one side of an apple or pomegranate. She then travels to Blanca's castle and has the apple served while sharing dinner with her. After Richilde leaves, Blanca falls ill and seemingly dies. The dwarfs create a coffin with a glass window so that Blanca can be seen inside, and she is interred in the castle's chapel.

Richilde begins consulting the mirror every day until suddenly Blanca reappears alive. Richilde orders Sambul to poison some soap, and sends her nurse dressed as a peddler to sell it to Blanca. As Richilde's evil worsens, the magic mirror rusts until it's unusable. When Blanca shows up alive again, Richilde has Sambul imprisoned and mutilated, and orders him to create a poisoned letter under pain of death. Unbeknownst to Richilde, Sambul is actually a righteous man who has been using non-lethal sleeping potions. Blanca opens the drugged letter, succumbs, and is placed in her coffin again.

The handsome young Gottfried of Ardenne, on his way back from a pilgrimage to Rome, passes by Blanca's castle and hears her story. He tries placing a healing relic over her heart at the exact moment she revives. They are already falling in love and he secretly moves her to his home in Ardenne. However, he is determined to have justice against Richilde. He travels to Brabant, where Richilde tries to seduce him. He plays along and proposes, asking her to come to Ardenne for the wedding. However, at the wedding he tells Richilde that he gave a dower to twelve virgins who were also supposed to be married that day, but one has been murdered out of jealousy by her own mother. When asked what punishment would suit this crime, Richilde says that the cruel mother should be forced to dance in red-hot iron shoes. Then Blanca appears, alive, dressed for her wedding. The horrified Richilde receives the same punishment she described and is then thrown into a dungeon. Blanca and Gottfried celebrate their marriage, and Sambul the physician is rewarded.

== Analysis ==
"Richilde" is the oldest surviving German version of the "Snow White" story. Musäus attributed the stories to the German folk, and researcher Christine Shojaei Kawan felt that the flipped-perspective setup of a villain protagonist did indeed suggest the existence of an older folk tradition. However, due to its literary nature and departures from the folktale model, Kawan later stated that "Richilde" cannot be considered a true variant of the German folktale.

Musäus wrote the story with an ironic and satirical style, similar to Charles Perrault and Giambattista Basile, and aimed more at an adult audience than at children. It is pseudo-historical, featuring fictionalized versions of several historical figures. He lampoons excessive piety in the character of the Count of Brabant, and hints that Albertus Magnus may be Richilde's real father.

== See also ==
- The Goose Girl
