= Rübezahl =

Mountain spirit from German, Czech, and Polish folklore

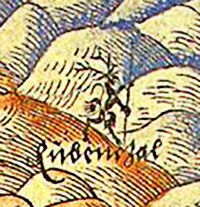
Rübezahl (Rübenczal) as a tailed demon, first known depiction by Martin Helwig, 1561

Rübezahl (German: [ˈʁyːbəˌtsaːl], Polish: Liczyrzepa, Duch Gór, Karkonosz, Rzepiór, or Rzepolicz; Czech: Krakonoš or Rýbrcoul) is a folkloric mountain spirit (woodwose) of the Giant Mountains (Czech: Krkonoše, Polish: Karkonosze, hence his name in Czech and Polish), a mountain range along the border between the Czech Republic and Poland. He is the subject of many legends and fairy tales in German, Polish, and Czech folklore.

== Name ==
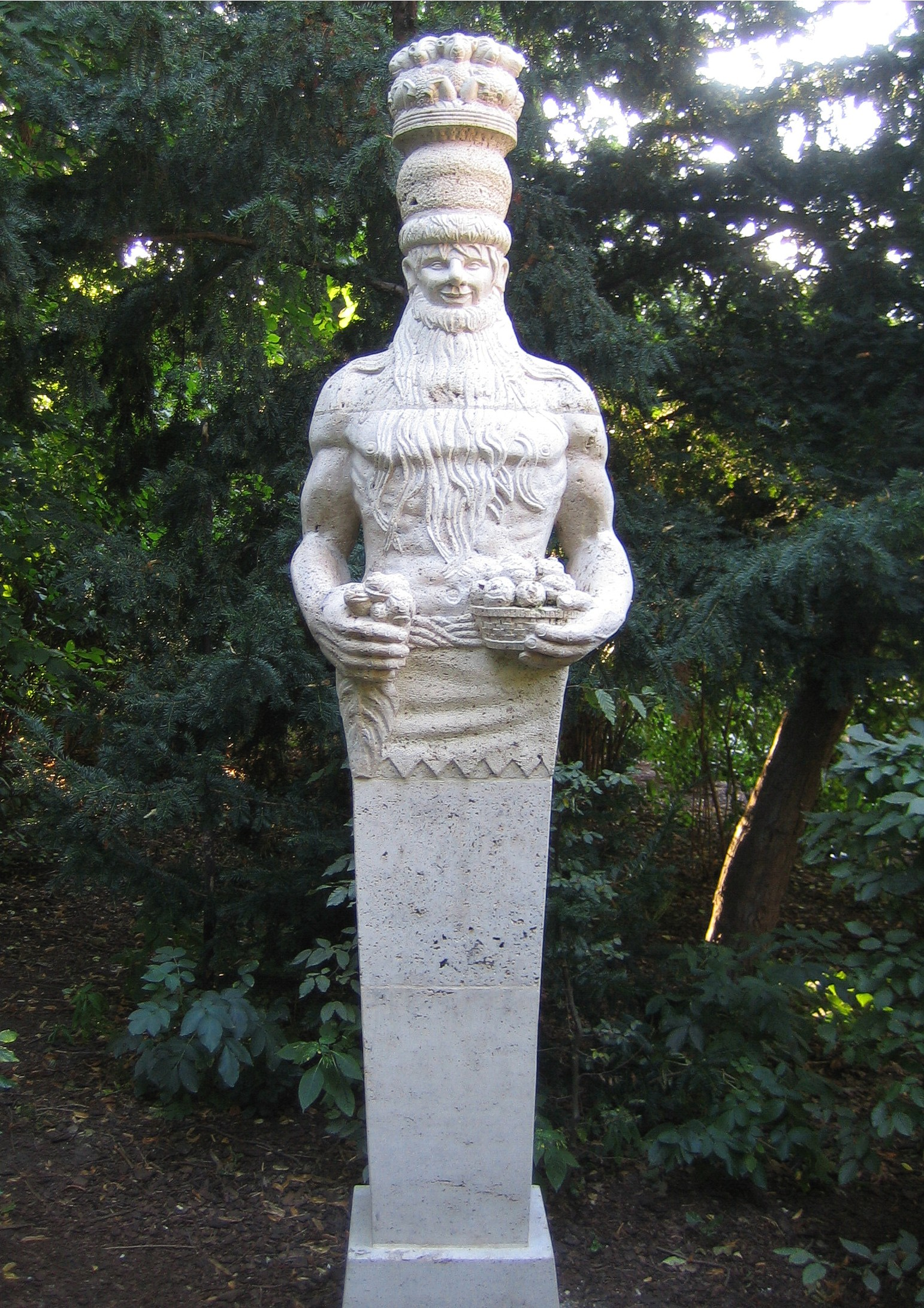
The Rübezahl statue in Berlin's Märchenbrunnen Fountain

The origin of the name is not clear. One interpretation is from the story How Rübezahl Got his Name by Johann Karl August Musäus, which recounts how Rübezahl abducted a princess who liked turnips (German: Rüben, singular Rübe). The princess gets very lonely there in the mountains. To keep her company, Rübezahl turns the turnips into her friends and acquaintances. As the turnips wilt after a little while, so do the persons that were created by Rübezahl's magic. The princess asks him to count (zählen) the turnips in the field. While he counted, she escaped. Following this explanation, some early English writers translated his name as "Number Nip" (that is, "turnip numberer"), including the 1911 Encyclopædia Britannica.

Another proposed etymology is Riebezagel, from a combination of the personal name Riebe and the Middle High German zagel, meaning "tail", from his pictorial representation as a tailed demon. According to the etymologist Friedrich Kluge, the name is a contraction of Middle High German Ruobezagel, 'turnip-tail'.

Rübezahl is a name of ridicule, the use of which provokes his anger. In fact calling him by this nickname was the one crime he would not tolerate. Respectful names are "Lord of the Mountain(s)" (Herr vom Berge, Herr der Berge), "Treasure Keeper" (Schatzhüter) or among herbalists "Lord John" (Herr Johannes, Latin vocative: Domine Johannes). In one Silesian folktale, he is called "Prince of the Gnomes" (Fürst der Gnomen).

The Polish name Liczyrzepa is a direct translation of the German name, introduced by Stanisław Bełza in 1898. It only became widespread in Poland after 1945 when Józef Sykulski started to translate tales of Rübezahl from German into Polish. The Czech name, Krakonoš, is simply derived from the name of the mountains.

== Legends ==
Rübezahl, you should know, has the nature of a powerful genius: capricious, impetuous, peculiar, rascally, crude, immodest, haughty, vain, fickle, today your warmest friend, tomorrow alien and cold; …roguish and respectable, stubborn and flexible…

— Translated extract: Musäus, "Legenden von Rübezahl" from Volksmährchen der Deutschen volume 2 (1783)

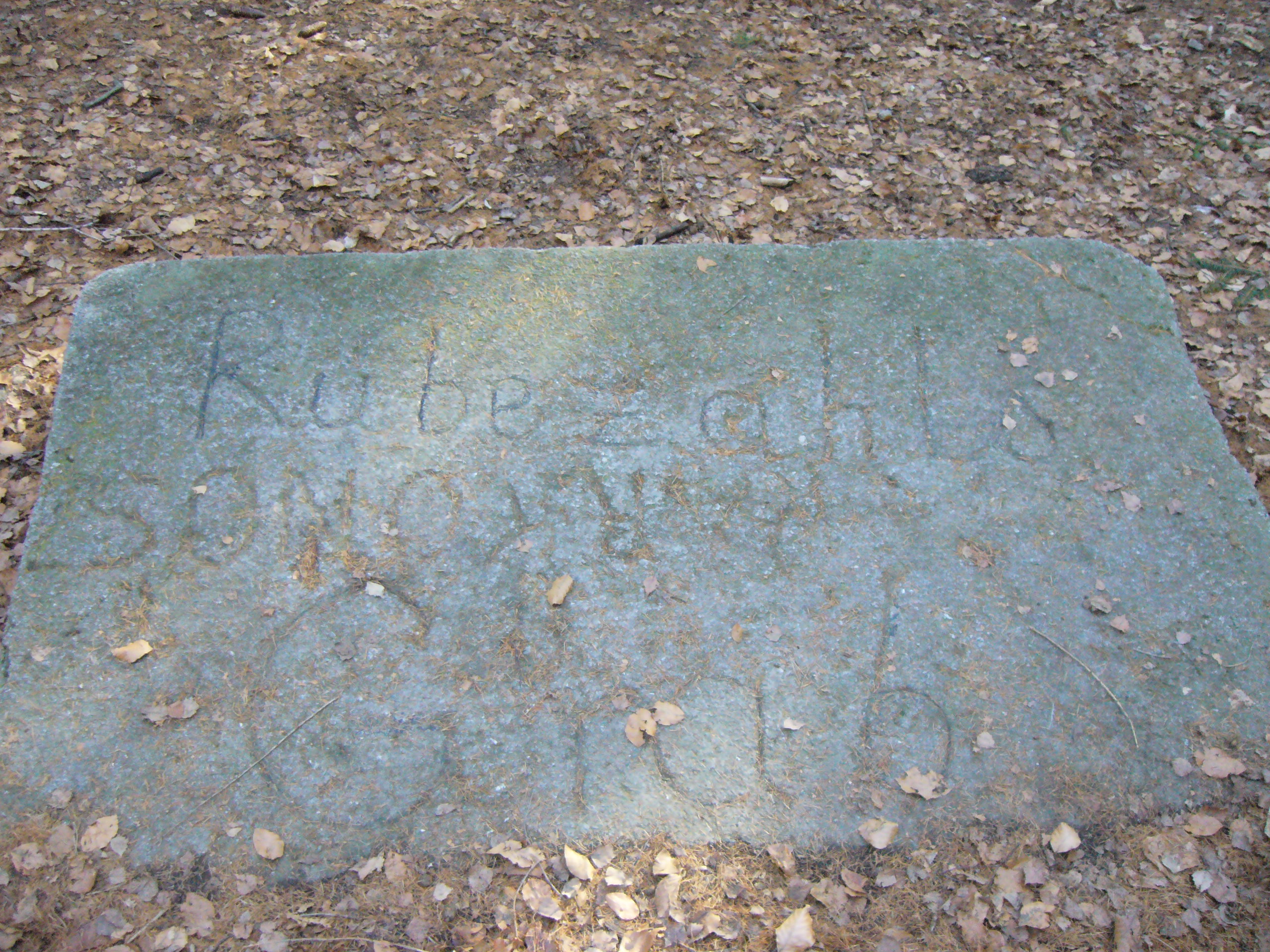
The Grave of Rübezahl in Szklarska Poręba

In legends, Rübezahl appears as a capricious giant, gnome, or mountain spirit. With good people he is friendly, teaching them medicine and giving them presents. If someone derides him, however, he exacts a severe revenge. He sometimes plays the role of a trickster in folk tales.

The stories originate from pagan times. Rübezahl is the fantastic lord of weather of the mountains and is similar to the Wild Hunt. Unexpectedly or playfully, he sends lightning and thunder, fog, rain and snow from the mountain above, even while the sun is shining. He may take the appearance of a monk in a gray frock (like Wotan); he holds a stringed instrument in his hand (the storm harp) and walks so heavily that the earth trembles around him.

In Czech fairytales, Rübezahl (Czech: Krakonoš) gave sourdough to people and invented the traditional regional soup kyselo. In the Giant Mountains is a mountain named Kotel, which means cauldron. When fog rises from the valley at the bottom of the Kotel, people say that Krakonoš is cooking kyselo. Rübezahl is seen to be the guardian of the Giant Mountains. Physically, his appearance varies; he can take any form he wishes, from an old grandma to a giant crossing his mountains with one step. Historically, his character has kept on expanding; from a bad demon causing storms and heavy snow, he evolved into a guardian of the poor people living in his mountains. It is said that he could test someone at any time to know whether that person's heart is pure (e.g. meeting someone as an old lady asking for help) and that if one does, that person would be shown the way to treasures hidden deep inside his mountains. He punished the German landlords mistreating Czech people as well as any invaders.

Artistic depictions of Rubezahl

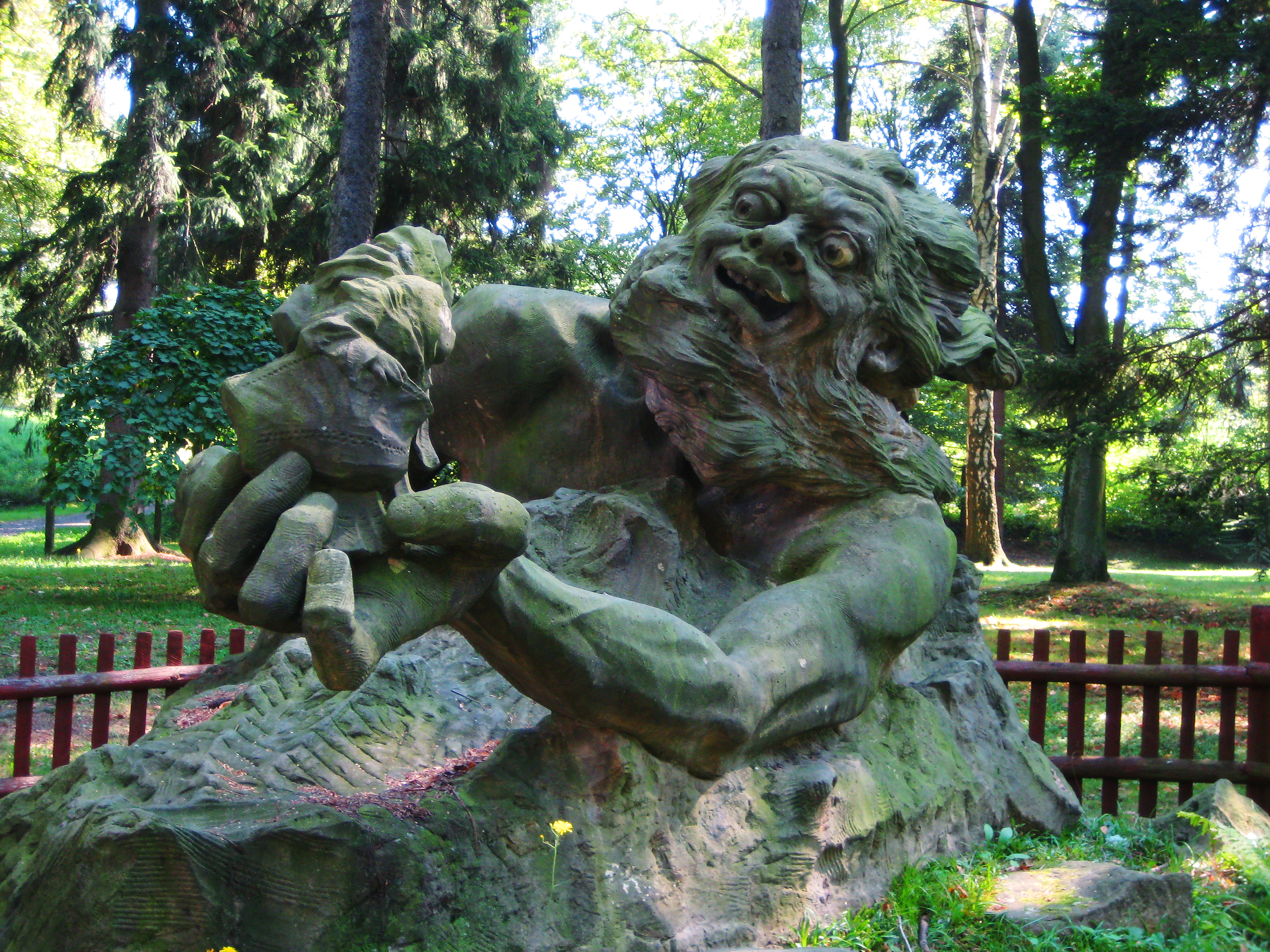
Sculpture of Krakonoš in Hořice

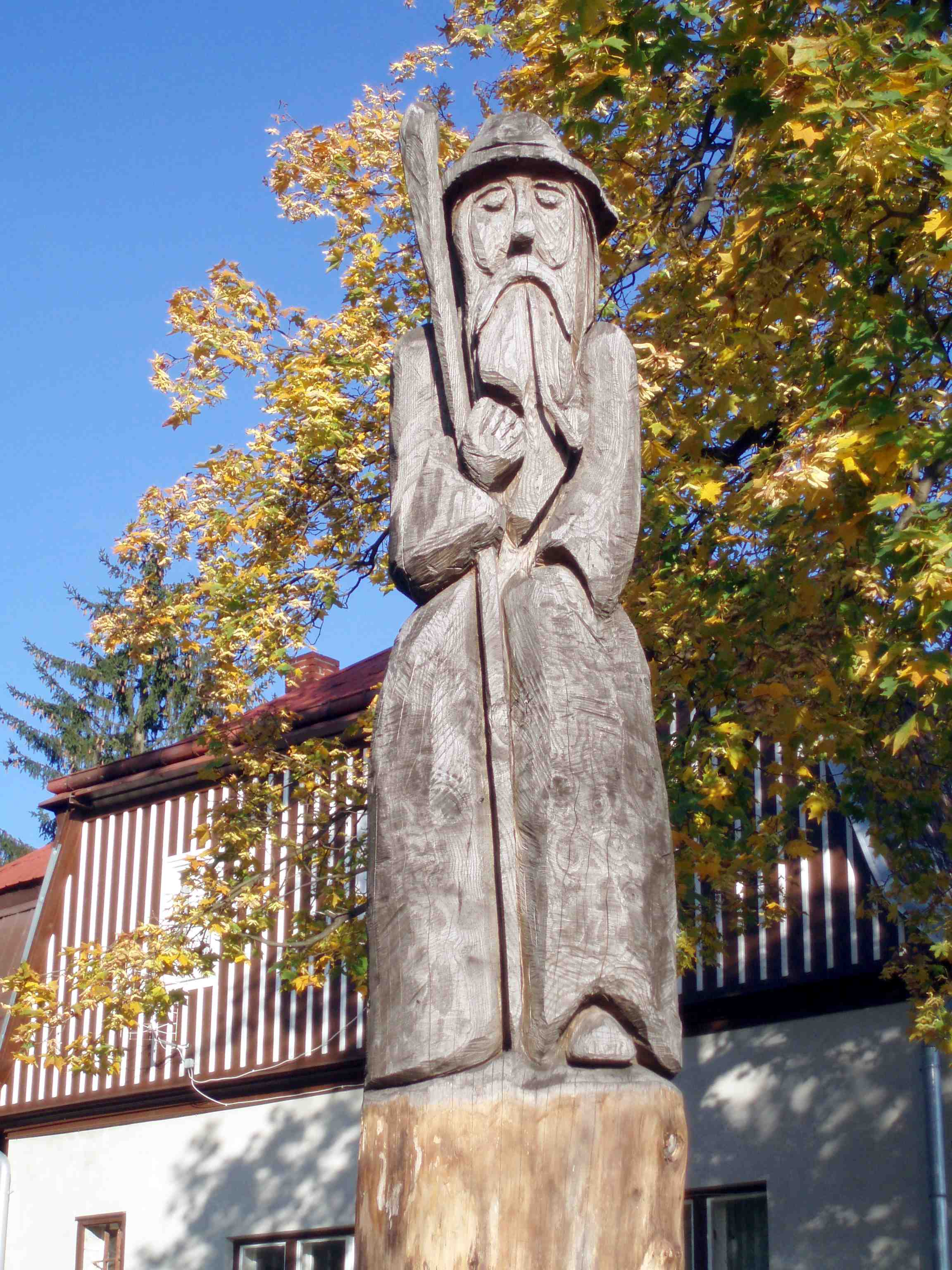
Rubezahl woodcarving in the Polish Giant Mountains

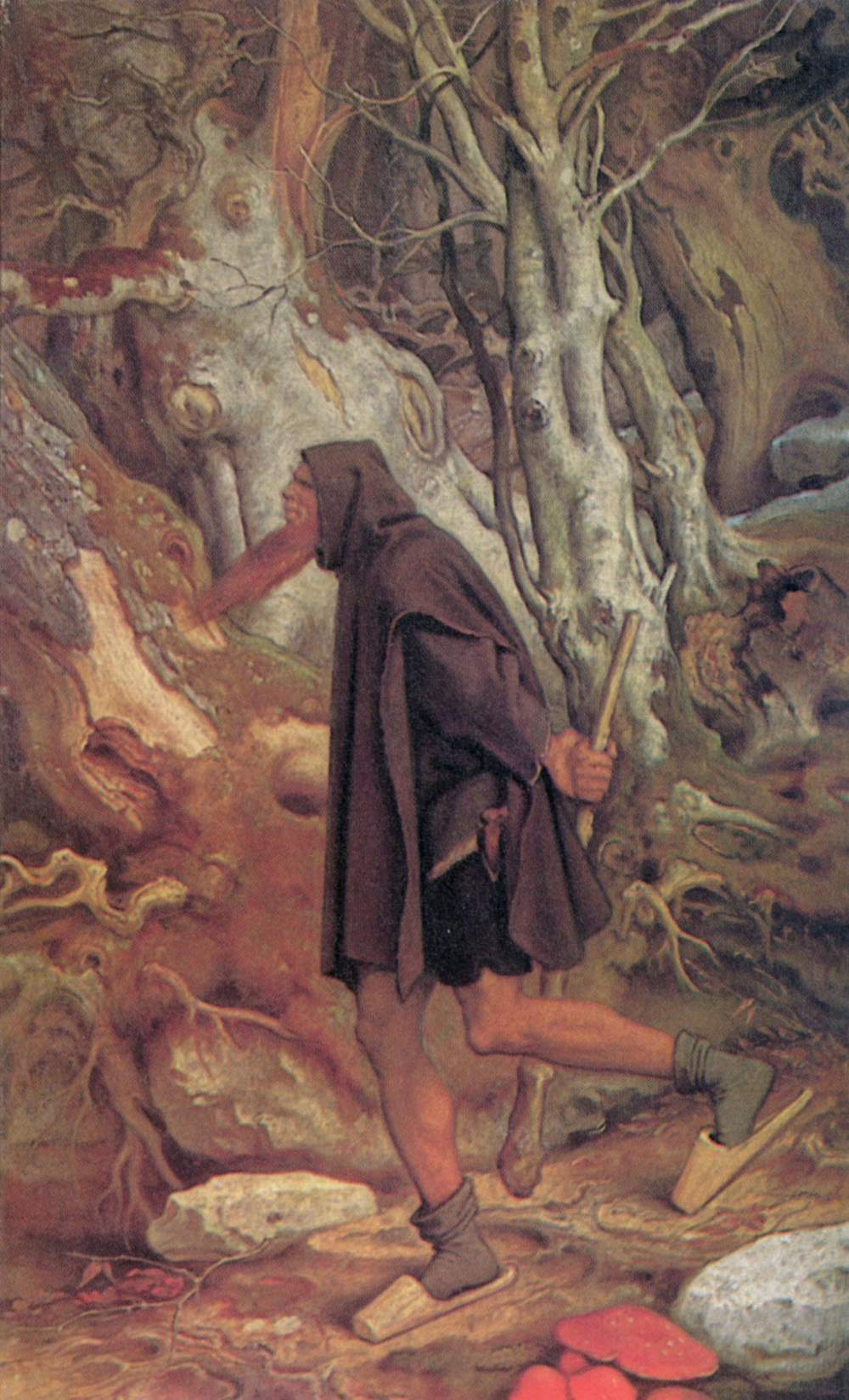
"Rübezahl" by Moritz von Schwind (1859)

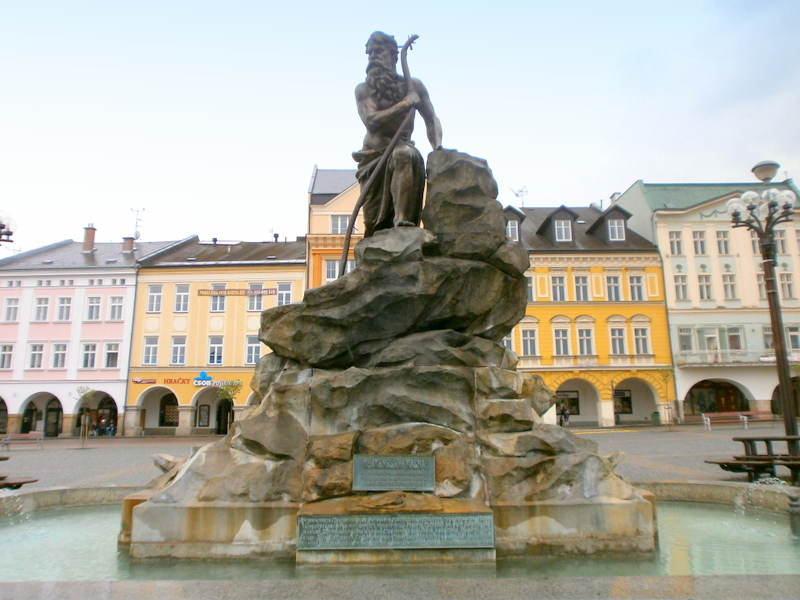
The 3-metre-high Krakonoš Fountain in Trutnov

== Museum ==
A museum devoted to the figure of Rübezahl in the German town of Görlitz, the Rübezahl Museum, was opened in May 2005, thanks to the work of Ingrid Vettin-Zahn. Originally from Lauban (Lubań) in Lower Silesia, Vettin-Zahn was expelled from her hometown like other Silesian Germans and subsequently resettled in Switzerland after 1945.

=== Postwar reinterpretation ===
After 1945, when the formerly German territories of Lower Silesia became again part of Poland, Polish settlers encountered the local legends of Rübezahl. Writer Józef Sykulski reinterpreted the figure as a Slavic spirit who protected the mountain people against oppression. In this adaptation, ordinary folk bore Slavic names while the lords were given German ones, aligning with the era's class-based narrative framework. Sykulski's version, however, was not universally accepted, as some regarded Rübezahl as too closely associated with German folklore.

== Appearances in literature ==
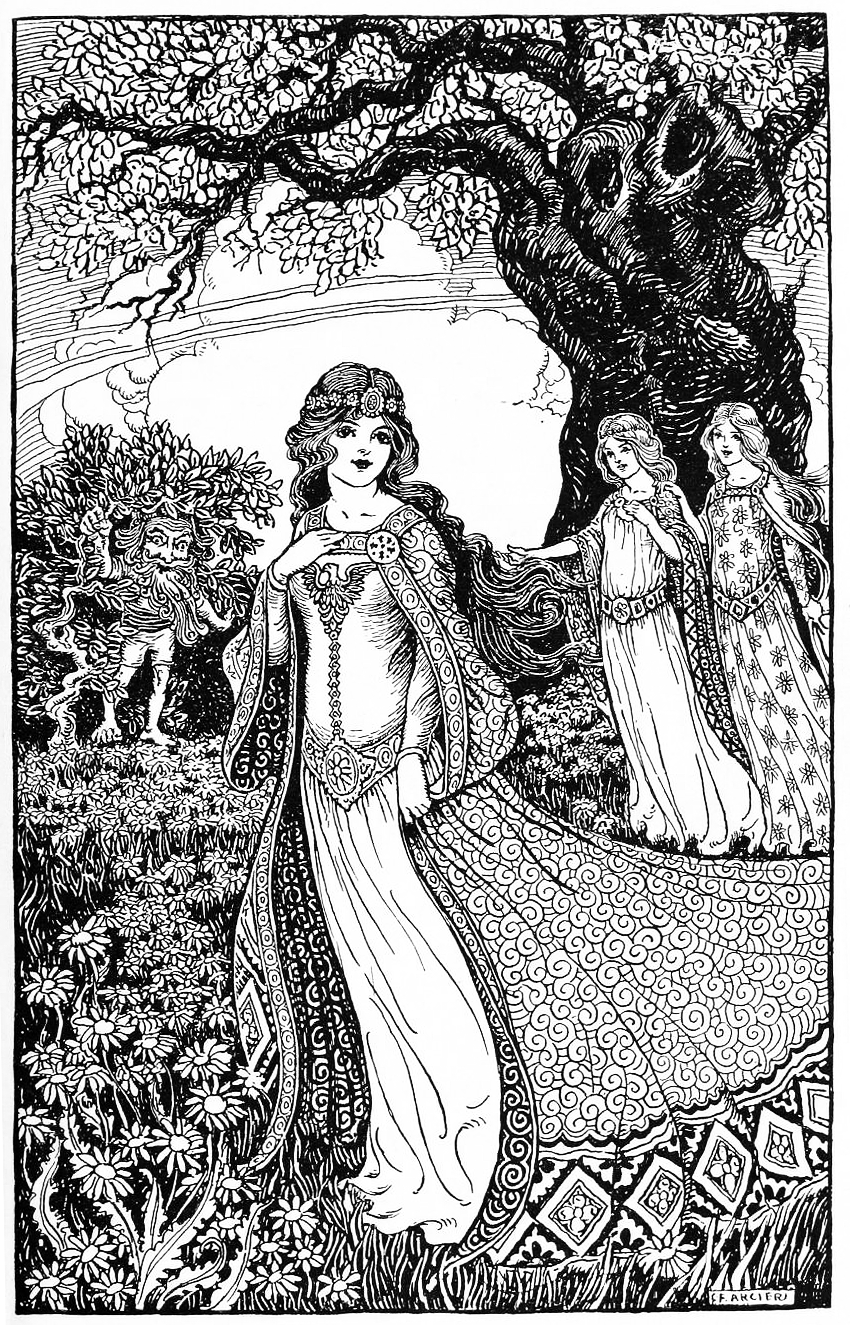
Illustration taken from James Lee & James T. Carey: "Silesian Folk Tales (The Book of Rubezahl)". American Book Company, New York 1915.

Rübezahl was first mentioned in 1565 as Ribicinia in a poem by Franz von Koeckritz. The Rübezahl story was first collected and written down by Johannes Praetorius in the Daemonologia Rubinzalii Silesii (1662). The character later appeared in Johann Karl August Musäus's "Legenden von Rübezahl" (1783), Carl Hauptmann's Rübezahl-Buch (1915) and Otfried Preußler's Mein Rübezahl-Buch (1993). Poems include Ferdinand Freiligrath's "Aus dem schlesischen Gebirge" (1844) and Robert Reinick's "Rübezahls Mittagstisch" (1876). New short stories featuring Rübezahl were also written, such as Johann August Apel's "Der Todtentanz" in Gespensterbuch (vol 3, 1811), and Friedrich de la Motte Fouqué's "Das Schauerfeld" (1814) and "Die Geschichten vom Rübezahl" (1816). In Britain this included three new "Legends of Number-Nip" (1826–1828) by Scottish authors the Misses Corbett, and the unfinished story "The Lord of the Hills" (c. 1835) by Thomas Love Peacock.

Several German Rübezahl tales have been translated into English, including eight of Praetorius' stories by William John Thoms (1834); many translations of Musäus' tales, notably by Thomas Beddoes (1791), William Hazlitt (1845), and Mark Lemon (1863); Apel, Fouqué, and Henrik Steffens' stories by George Godfrey Cunningham (1829); five of Johann Peter Lyser's tales by Elizabeth F. Ellet (1847); and Rosalie Koch's version by Charles Nordhoff (1858) and Mary Catherine Rowsell (1864). Freiligrath's Rübezahl poem was also translated into English as "From the Mountains of Silesia" by Mary Howitt (1844), and Franz Abt's singspiel Rübezahl by William Grist (c. 1888).

The Rübezahl legends also inspired other stories. He may have been the inspiration for the character Huhn in Gerhart Hauptmann's "Und Pippa Tanzt!". The poem "Count Carrots" by Gerda Mayer is based on the tale and appears in The Oxford Book of Story Poems. Rübezahl is mentioned in Mike Mignola's Hellboy: Conqueror Worm (2001) by the character Inger Von Klempt.

=== Rübezahl's Garden ===
Near Mount Sněžka in Czechia close to the Polish border, there is a botanical locality with an especially large variety of plants that bears the name "Rübezahl's Garden". Some unusual stone buildings in the area are named after him as well, for example the Rübezahlkanzel an den Schneegruben.

In the vicinity of Jelenia Góra and other Polish locales under the Giant Mountains, there is an annual series of opera performances titled Muzyczny Ogród Liczyrzepy, which translates into English as "Rübezahl's Musical Garden". In 2016, the series commenced for the thirteenth time.

=== In music ===
- Joseph Schuster: opera Rübenzahl, ossia Il vero amore (1789 Trieste)
- Carl Maria von Weber: romantic opera Rübezahl (1805 Breslau)
- Franz Danzi: romantic opera Der Berggeist oder Schicksal und Treue (1813 Karlsruhe)
- Wilhelm Würfel: opera Rübezahl (1824 Prague)
- Louis Spohr: opera Der Berggeist (1825 Kassel)
- August Conradi: comic opera Rübezahl (1849 Berlín)
- Francis Edward Bache: operetta Rubezahl (1853)
- Friedrich von Flotow: opera Rübezahl (1852 Retzin, Groß Pankow)
- Gustav Mahler: opera Rübezahl (1879–83), music lost but libretto preserved
- Franz Abt: singspiel Rübezahl (1884 Offenbach)
- Arthur H. Bird: ballet Rübezahl (1887)
- Josef Richard Rozkošný: opera Krakonoš (1889 Prague)
- Hans Sommer: opera Rübezahl und der Sackpfeifer von Neiße (1904 Braunschweig)
- Erich Wolfgang Korngold: movement No. 3 of Märchenbilder Op. 3 (1911 Karlsbad)
- Amon Düül II: instrumental psychedelic rock track The Return of Rübezahl on the LP Yeti (album) (1970)
- Jan Klusák: opera pasticcio Bertram a Mescalinda aneb Potrestaná věrnost též Očarované housle Einsteinovy čili Krakonošův dar (2002 Praha)
- Dschinghis Khan: song Rübezahl from LP Helden, Schurken & der Dudelmoser (1982)
- Joachim Witt: albums Rübezahl (2018), Rübezahls Rückkehr (2020) and Rübezahls Reise (2022)

=== In film ===
- Rübezahl's Wedding (1916)
- Rübezahl (1957)

=== In games ===
In Warhammer Age of Sigmar, a horned centaur-like god of earthquakes and upheaval that was imprisoned in a mountain is named Kragnos, presumably after Krakonoš.

=== Krakonoš ===
The Czech variant of Rübezahl, Krakonoš, features in literature and in other culture:

- Krakonoš played an important role in old local legends in the Giant Mountains, which have been collected since 1618. To the present day Krakonoš features as the principal character in many regional folk-tales.
- Krakonoš appeared as a main character in the Czech children's television series Krkonošské pohádky (English: Fairy Tales From the Giant Mountains) broadcast in the program Večerníček.
- A brewery located in Trutnov makes "Krakonoš" beer.
- According to Krakonoš it was named Solitalea-like bacterium Ca. Krakonobacterium.
