= Julia Emily Gordon =

British painter and engraver (1810–1896)

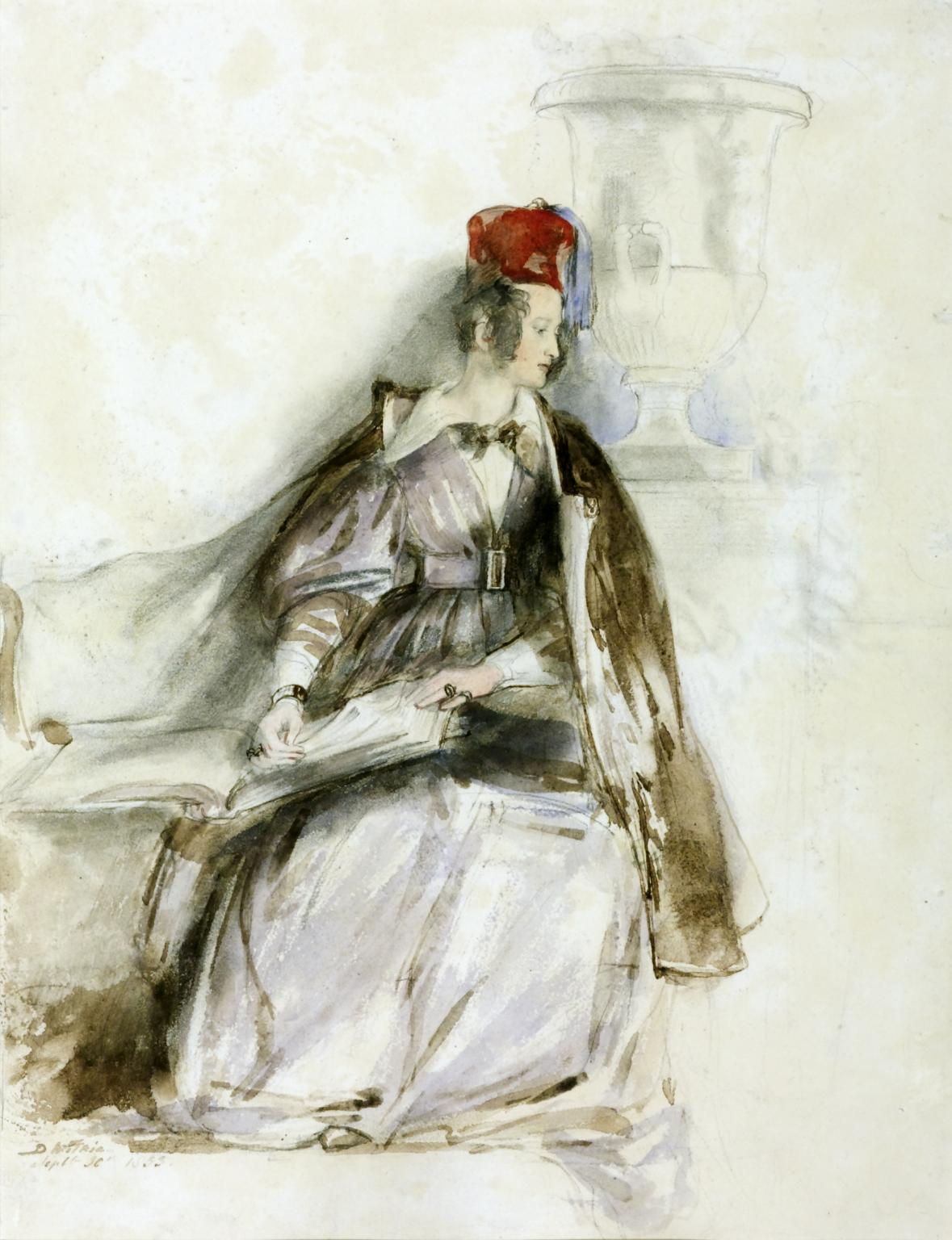
1833 portrait of Julia Emily Gordon by David Wilkie

Julia Emily Gordon (1810 – 8 February 1896) was a British painter and engraver.

== Life ==
She was the daughter of Willoughby Gordon and his wife Isabella Julia Lavina Bennet; her father sketched and her mother worked in watercolour and other media. The works of mother and daughter have sometimes been confused. Her brother Henry Percy Gordon was an engraver, and they produced joint work. The watercolourist Edward Swinburne, brother of Sir John Swinburne, 6th Baronet, was a relation by marriage.

Her parents lived at Beckenham and Northcourt Manor, Isle of Wight. J. M. W. Turner stayed with them in 1827, at Northcourt.

Gordon died on 8 February 1896 in London.

== Works ==
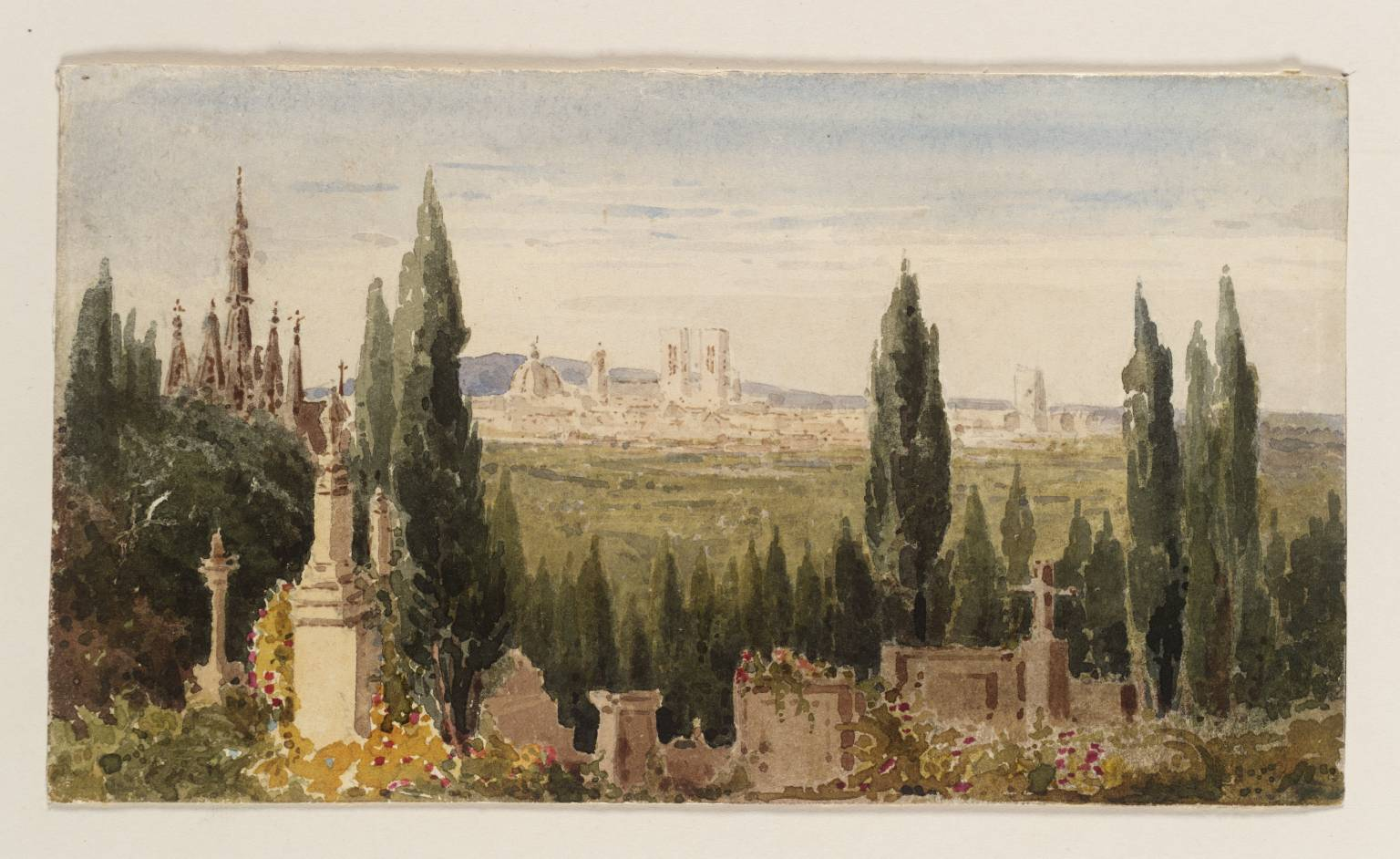
Julia Emily Gordon, Père-Lachaise

Gordon's work is included in the collections of the British Museum and the Tate Museum, London. Her personal papers are held in the Isle of Wight Record Office and the Kent History and Library Centre. Gordon was the engraver for Milton's Penseroso, a work by John Milton held in the metropolitan Museum of Art. Pennsylvania State University Libraries hold her "Sketches on the Rhine, and Rime del Petrarca", and an unpublished translation by her of Johann Karl August Musäus' "The Books of the Chronicles of the Three Sisters" for "J. H. A." In 1879 she published 44 etchings as a book titled Songs and Etchings in Shade and Sunshine, using the initials "J. E. G."
