= Fantasmagoriana =

French anthology of German ghost stories

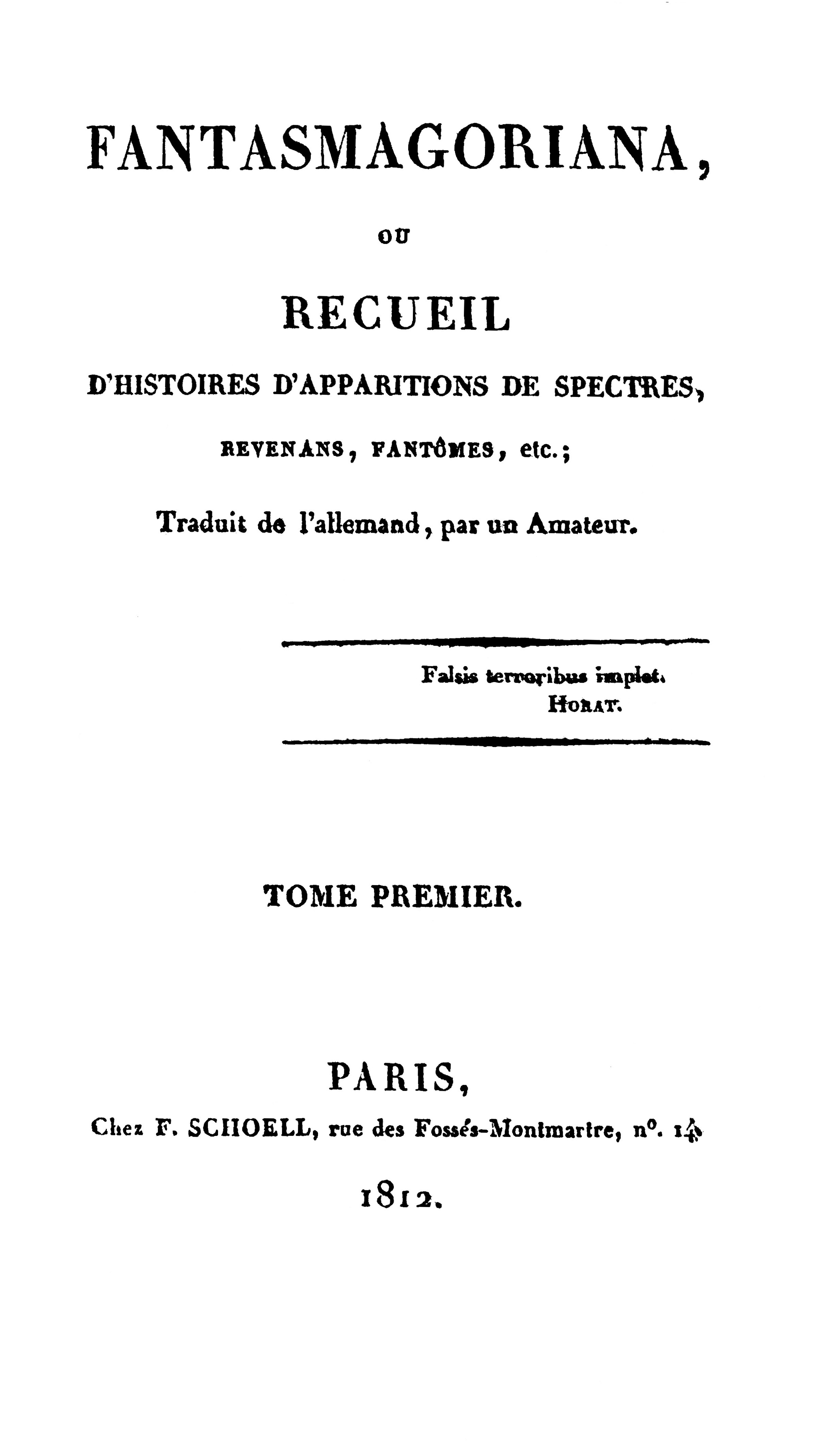
- First edition, volume 1 title page
- Author: Johann Karl August Musäus, Johann August Apel, Friedrich Laun, Heinrich Clauren
- Translator: Jean-Baptiste Benoît Eyriès
- Language: French
- Genre: German Gothic fiction
- Publisher: F. Schoell
- Publication date: 1812
- Publication place: France
- Media type: Print: 2 volumes, duodecimo
- Pages: 600
- OCLC: 559494402
- Original text: Fantasmagoriana at French Wikisource

Fantasmagoriana is a French anthology of German ghost stories, translated anonymously by Jean-Baptiste Benoît Eyriès and published in 1812. Most of the stories are from the first two volumes of Johann August Apel and Friedrich Laun's Gespensterbuch (1810–1811), with other stories by Johann Karl August Musäus and Heinrich Clauren.

It was read by Lord Byron, Mary Shelley, Percy Bysshe Shelley, John William Polidori and Claire Clairmont at the Villa Diodati in Cologny, Switzerland, during June 1816, the Year Without a Summer, and inspired them to write their own ghost stories, including "The Vampyre" (1819), and Frankenstein (1818), both of which went on to shape the Gothic horror genre.

== Title ==
Fantasmagoriana takes its name from Étienne-Gaspard Robert's Fantasmagorie, a phantasmagoria show (French: fantasmagoria, from fantasme, "fantasy" or "hallucination", and possibly Greek: αγορά, agorá, "assembly" or "meeting", with the suffix -ia) of the late 1790s and early 1800s, using magic lantern projection together with ventriloquism and other effects to give the impression of ghosts (French: fantôme). This is appended with the suffix -iana, which "denotes a collection of objects or information relating to a particular individual, subject, or place".

The subtitle "Recueil d'histoires, d'apparitions, de spectres, revenans, fantômes, etc.; Traduit de l'allemand, par un Amateur" translates as "anthology of stories of apparitions of spectres, revenants, phantoms, etc.; translated from the German by an amateur".

The book and its title went on to inspire others by different authors, named in a similar vein: Spectriana (1817), Démoniana (1820) and Infernaliana (1822).

== Stories ==
Eyriès chose a selection of eight German ghost stories to translate for a French audience. The first story ("L'Amour Muet") was from Johann Karl August Musäus' satirical retellings of traditional folk tales Volksmärchen der Deutschen (1786). The next ("Portraits de Famille") was by Johann August Apel, first published in Johann Friedrich Kind's Malven (1805), but reprinted in Apel's anthology Cicaden (1810). Of the remaining six tales, five were from the first two volumes of Apel and Laun's Gespensterbuch (1810–1811), and one ("La Chambre Grise") was by the highly popular author Heinrich Clauren, which had been parodied by Apel in one of his Gespensterbuch stories ("Die schwarze Kammer", translated as "La Chambre Noire"). Fantasmagoriana was partly translated into English in 1813 by Sarah Elizabeth Utterson as Tales of the Dead, containing the first five stories (see list, below); thus three of the five stories from Gespensterbuch. Three editions in three countries and languages over a period of three years shows that these ghost stories were very popular.

=== List of stories ===
Vol.	Fantasmagoriana	Literal translation	German original	German source	Author
1	"L'Amour muet"	The Dumb Love	"Stumme Liebe"	Volksmärchen der Deutschen, vol. 4	Musäus
1	"Les Portraits de Famille"	The Family Portraits	"Die Bilder der Ahnen"	Cicaden, vol. 1	Apel
1	"La Tête de Mort"	The Death's Head	"Der Todtenkopf"	Gespensterbuch, vol. 2	Laun
2	"La Morte Fiancée"	The Death Bride	"Die Todtenbraut"	Gespensterbuch, vol. 2	Laun
2	"L'Heure fatale"	The Fatal Hour	"Die Verwandtschaft mit der Geisterwelt"	Gespensterbuch, vol. 1	Laun
2	"Le Revenant"	The Revenant	"Der Geist des Verstorbenen"	Gespensterbuch, vol. 1	Laun
2	"La Chambre grise"	The Grey Chamber	"Die graue Stube (Eine buchstäblich wahre Geschichte)"	Der Freimüthige (newspaper)	Clauren
2	"La Chambre noire"	The Black Chamber	"Die schwarze Kammer. Anekdote"	Gespensterbuch, vol. 2	Apel

== Reception ==
An 1812 review of Fantasmagoriana in the Journal de l'Empire concluded that "For a translation from the German this is not too badly written, nor too badly told". Friedrich Laun quoted this review in his Memoirs, attributing it to Julien Louis Geoffroy, and also mentioned that he owned a copy of Fantasmagoriana.
