= Caroline M. Sawyer =

American writer (1812–1894)

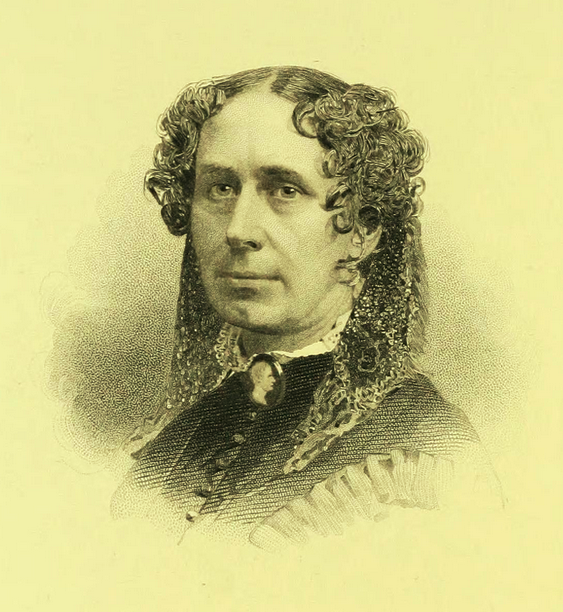
- Photo in Our woman workers, 1882
- Born: Caroline Mehitable Fisher; December 10, 1812; Newton, Massachusetts, U.S.
- Died: May 19, 1894 (aged 81); Somerville, Massachusetts, U.S.
- Resting place: Mount Auburn Cemetery, Cambridge, Massachusetts, U.S.
- Occupations: Poet; writer; editor
- Spouse: Thomas J. Sawyer (m. 1831)
- Writing career
- Pen name: Mrs. C. M. Sawyer
- Language: English
- Genres: biography; non-fiction; poetry
- Subject: religion

Signature
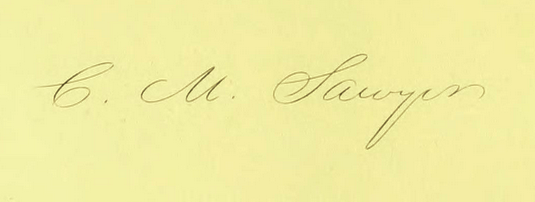

Caroline M. Sawyer (née, Fisher; pen name, Mrs. C. M. Sawyer; December 10, 1812 – May 19, 1894) was a 19th-century American poet, writer, and editor. Her writings ranged through a wide variety of themes. Born in 1812, in Massachusetts, she began composing verse at an early age, but published little till after her marriage. Thereafter, she wrote much for various reviews and other miscellanies, besides several volumes of tales, sketches, and essays. She also made numerous translations from German literature, in prose and verse, in which she evinced an appreciation of the original. Sawyer's poems were numerous, sufficient for several volumes, though they were not published as a collection.

== Early life and education ==
Caroline Mehitable Fisher was born in Newton, Massachusetts, December 10, 1812. She was related to the Gores, Danas, Gridleys, Foxcrofts and Kendricks, and was a descendant of Thomas Cranmer. Sawyer's maternal grandfather (with whom she lived with a widowed mother and a highly educated but invalid uncle) was John Kendrick, who commanded a company at the Battles of Lexington and Concord, and was a conscientious abolitionist.

At a Baptist Sunday school, where the Bible and Isaac Watts' hymns were committed to memory, Sawyer recited the first eight chapters of the Gospel of Mark when she was just eight years old. Before the age of ten, she had read Shakespeare, John Bunyan's The Pilgrim's Progress, Plutarch's Parallel Lives, as well as Hume's and Smollett's History of England.

At school, after eating lunch, she would improvise stories of knights and ladies, fairies and hobgoblins, for her fellow students. This continued until the invalid uncle, whose life had been passed in pursuits of science and literature, removed her from the country school to his own supervision. She was then carefully and thoroughly educated at home. Soon after this, he prepared an herbarium of the hundreds of wild plants of New England growing within 10 miles (16 km) of Boston, for the Royal Botanical Society of Edinburgh, Scotland; in all these collections and preparations, the uncle instructed Sawyer in the science of nature. Sawyer was also educated in French and German, as well as history and mythology.

== Career ==
Sawyer started writing when very young. The "Burlington Sentinel" published her first poem. Young as she was, she was a welcome contributor to the "Sentinel," and afterward to the "Boston Evening Gazette" and " Democratic Review."

In September 1831, she married Rev. Thomas J. Sawyer, D.D., the pastor of Orchard Street Church, in New York City. At the end of about 15 years, Rev. Sawyer was chosen president of Clinton Liberal Institute, Universalist seminary at Clinton, Oneida County, New York, and they moved to that town when he assumed the office.

Sawyer was one of the most prolific writers of Christian universalism denominational literature. During Sawyer's 25 years in New York, she was constantly recording writing. She was a contributor to "Graham's Magazine," the "Knickerbocker Magazine", and the "Democratic Review". For several years, she was a constant contributor to the "Odd Fellows' Magazine," published in Baltimore, Maryland; and for Horace Greeley's "New Yorker". Park Benjamin Sr., opened the door into the "New World" for Sawyer. Her stories, essays and poems were excellent. Her translations from the French and German were graceful.

Sawyer became editor of the "Rose of Sharon" in 1849; she was a constant contributor from its first appearance, in 1840, during Sarah Carter Edgarton Mayo's editorship. In 1860, she became editor of The Ladies' Repository. For several years, she was editor of the youth's department in the Christian Messenger, as well as the Universalist Union (1835–47).

== Personal life ==
In 1881, Thomas J. Sawyer, D.D., was Packard Professor of Theology in Tufts College, and Dean of the Department of Divinity.

She died May 19, 1894, in Somerville, Massachusetts, and was buried in Mount Auburn Cemetery, Cambridge, Massachusetts.
