= August Lafontaine =

German novelist (1758–1831)

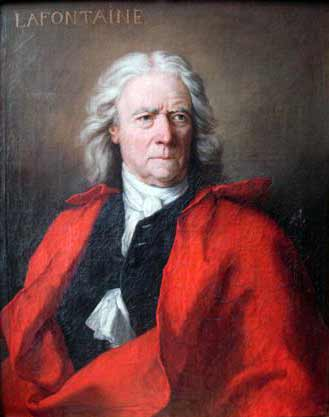
- Portrait by Jean-Laurent Mosnier, c. 1798
- Born: 5 October 1758; Braunschweig, Germany
- Died: 20 April 1831 (aged 72); Halle (Saale), Germany
- Occupation: Writer
- Writing career
- Notable work: Leben und Thaten des Freiherrn Quinctius Heymeran von Flaming

August Heinrich Julius Lafontaine (5 October 1758 – 20 April 1831) was a German novelist.

== Biography ==
Lafontaine was born and brought up in Brunswick, the son of the court painter Ludolph Lafontaine and his fifth wife, the court maid-in-waiting Sophie Elisabeth Thorbrügge. He was educated in Helmstedt, where he studied theology, but took no degree. He then acted as a private tutor until 1789. In 1792, he served as a field chaplain in the Prussian army, and in 1800 settled in Halle. He became canon of the Magdeburg Cathedral as a reward for the dedication of one of his books to Friedrich Wilhelm III and Luise.

== Works ==
The popularity of his novels, which are sentimental and didactic tales of domestic life, was remarkable. In his lifetime, he was the most popular German novelist, his works surpassing by far the popularity of his contemporary Goethe's. He wrote over 150 volumes, using the pseudonyms Gustav Freier, Miltenberg or Selchow. His novels' tone of conservative moralizing sentimentality was regarded with high favor at the court of Prussia. Far less impressed was August Wilhelm Schlegel, writing in Athenaeum in May 1798: "He has indeed become a favourite writer. Lafontaine can never be more than that.... [for his work] lacks poetry, spirit, and romantic verve." Among his more popular works are:

- Der Naturmensch (1791)
- Gemälde des menschlichen Herzen (Paintings of the Human Heart; 1792 and later, 15 vols.)
- Der Sonderling (1793)
- Familiengeschichten (Family Stories; 1797-1804, 12 vols.)
- Saint Julien (1798)
- Fedor und Marie (1805)
- Descriptions of the Life of Man (1811)
- Die Pfarre an der See (The Parsonage on the Lake Side; 1816, 3 vols.)
- Le Confessioni al Sepolcro traduzione dal tedesco, con note e tavole incise in rame; stampato a Roma (1822, 3 vol.)

== Legacy ==
In Stendhal's novella Mina de Wangel, the titular protagonist, a romantic young aristocratic woman, is appalled by Lafontaine's venal depiction of love.
