= Fifty-Two Library =

Series of children's adventure stories

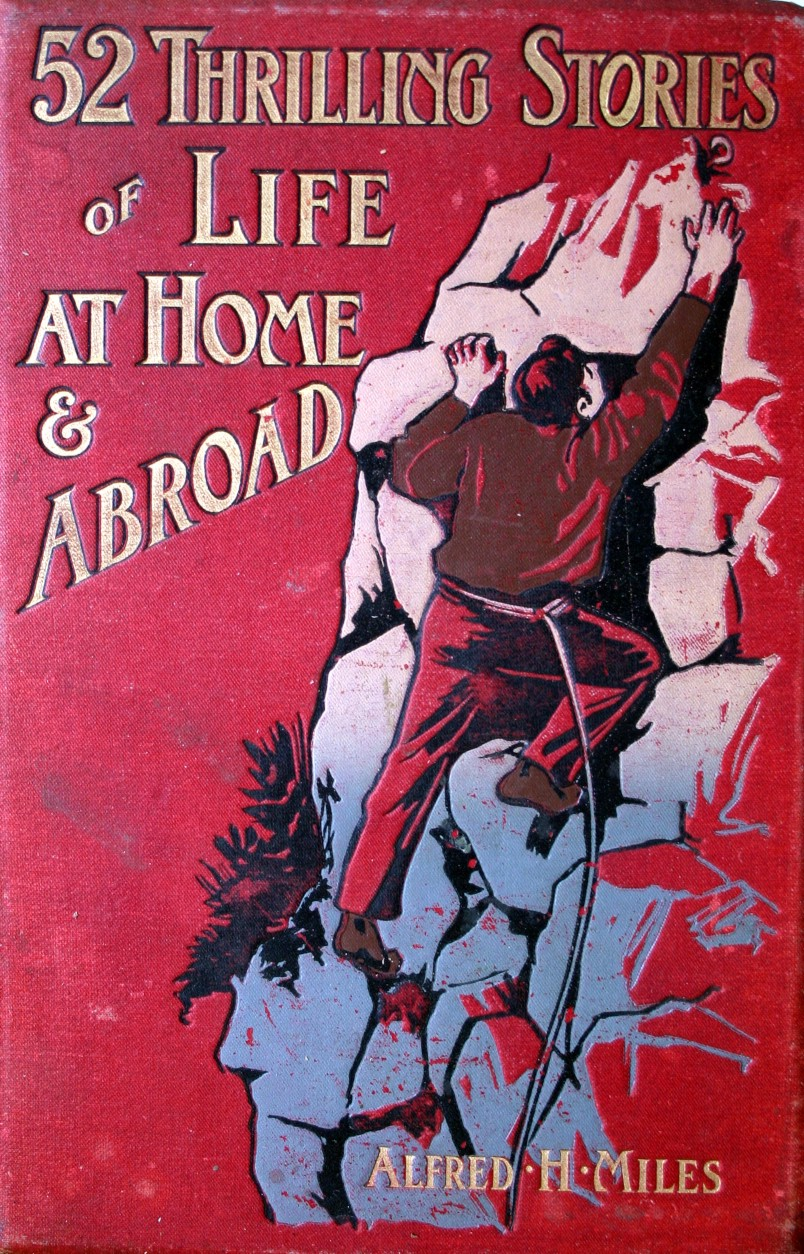

The Fifty-Two Library was a series of children's adventure stories published by Hutchinson & Co., London between the late nineteenth century and the early twentieth century, and later republished by D. Appleton & Co., New York.

The editor of the series was Alfred Henry Miles (1848–1929) and he compiled some fifty volumes that appeared at five shillings apiece. Miles was a prolific Victorian era author, editor, anthologist, journalist, composer and lecturer who arranged and edited hundreds of works on a wide range of topics.

== Books ==
1. Fifty-Two Stories for Boys (1889)
2. Fifty-Two Stories for Girls (1889)
3. Fifty-Two More Stories for Boys (1890)
4. Fifty-Two More Stories for Girls (1890)
5. Fifty-Two Further Stories for Boys (1891)
6. Fifty-Two Further Stories for Girls (1891) with Rosa M. Gilbert
7. Fifty-Two Other Stories for Boys (1892)
8. Fifty-Two Other Stories for Girls (1892)
9. Fifty-Two Fairy Tales (1892)
10. Fifty-Two Stories for Boyhood and Youth (1893)
11. Fifty-Two Stories for Girlhood and Youth (1893)
12. Fifty-Two Stories for Children (1893)
13. Fifty-Two Stories of Boy-Life at Home and Abroad (1894)
14. Fifty-Two Stories of Girl-Life at Home and Abroad (1894) with Rosa M. Gilbert
15. Fifty-Two Stories of Life and Adventure for Boys (1895)
16. Fifty-Two Stories of Life and Adventure for Girls (1895)
17. Fifty-Two Stories of the Indian Mutiny (1895) with Arthur John Pattle
18. Fifty-Two Stories of Pluck and Peril for Boys (1896)
19. Fifty-Two Stories of Pluck and Peril and Romance for Girls (1896)
20. Fifty-Two Stories of the British Navy, from Damme to Trafalgar (1896)
21. Fifty-Two Stories of Duty and Daring for Boys (1897)
22. Fifty-Two Stories of Duty and Daring for Girls (1897)
23. Fifty-Two Stories of the British Army (1897, 1915)
24. Fifty-Two Holiday Stories for Boys (1898)
25. Fifty-Two Holiday Stories for Girls (1898)
26. Fifty-Two Sunday Stories for Boys and Girls (1898)
27. Fifty-Two Stories of Heroism in Life and Action for Boys (1899)
28. Fifty-Two Stories of Heroism in Life and Action for Girls (1899)
29. Fifty-Two Stories of the Wide, Wide World (1899)
30. Fifty-Two Stirring Stories for Boys (1900)
31. Fifty-Two Stirring Stories for Girls (1900)
32. Fifty-Two Stories of the British Empire (1900, 1917)
33. Fifty-Two Stories of Courage and Endeavour for Boys (1901)
34. Fifty-Two Stories of Courage and Endeavour for Girls (1901)
35. Fifty-Two Stories of Greater Britain (1901)
36. Fifty-Two Stories of the Brave and True for Boys (1902)
37. Fifty-Two Stories of the Brave and True for Girls (1902)
38. Fifty-Two Stories for the Little Ones (1902)
39. Fifty-Two Stories of School Life and After for Boys (1903)
40. Fifty-Two Stories of School Life and After for Girls (1903)
41. Fifty-Two Stories of Animal Life and Adventure (1903)
42. Fifty-Two Stories of Grit and Character for Boys (1904)
43. Fifty-Two Stories of Grit and Character for Girls (1904)
44. Fifty-Two Stories of Wild Life East and West (1904)
45. Fifty-Two Stories of Head, Heart, and Hand for Boys (1905)
46. Fifty-Two Stories of Head, Heart, and Hand for Girls (1905)
47. Fifty-Two Thrilling Stories of Life at Home and Abroad (1905)
48. Fifty-Two New Stories for Boys (1906)
49. Fifty-Two New Stories for Girls (1906)
50. Fifty-Two Pioneer Stories All Round the Compass (1906)
51. Fifty-Two Excelsior Stories for Boys (1907)
52. Fifty-Two Excelsior Stories for Girls (1907)
