= Jean-Baptiste Benoît Eyriès =

French geographer, author and translator (1767–1846)

- Born: 24 June 1767; Marseille, France
- Died: 13 June 1846 (aged 78); Graville, Le Havre
- Resting place: Graville priory
- Education: College of Juilly
- Occupations: Geographer, translator
- Writing career
- Language: French
- Period: 1807–1847
- Genres: Academic, Gothic
- Subjects: Travel, geography
- Notable work: Fantasmagoriana
- Notable awards: Legion of Honour; 1844

Jean-Baptiste Benoît Eyriès (French: [ʒɑ̃ batist bənwa ɛːʁjɛs]; 24 June 1767 – 13 June 1846) was a French geographer, author and translator, best remembered in the English speaking world for his translation of German ghost stories Fantasmagoriana, published anonymously in 1812, which inspired Mary Shelley and John William Polidori to write Frankenstein and The Vampyre respectively. He was one of the founding members of the Société de Géographie, a member of the Société Asiatique, Académie des Inscriptions et Belles-Lettres, American Philosophical Society, and American Academy of Arts and Sciences, and was awarded the Legion of Honour. He had a mountain named after him near Yos Sudarso Bay in New Guinea, as well as a sandbank near French Island, Australia, and a street in Le Havre.

== Biography ==
Born in Marseille on 24 June 1767, the son of Jacques-Joseph Eyriès, a "lieutenant de frégates du roi" ('lieutenant of the king's frigates'), and Jeanne-Françoise Deluy (1748–1826). He moved to Le Havre in 1772 when his father was promoted to "commandant de la Marine" ('commander of the Navy'), and went to study at the College of Juilly. Eyriès began to travel to England, Germany, Sweden and Denmark to learn their languages and study botany and mineralogy, and through it grew to love geography and travel. Returning to Le Havre, he began working in the armaments trade, including commercial expeditions to various parts of the world, while taking care of a natural history museum there. In 1794 he went to Paris to free his father, who had been detained as a suspect in the new Republic, moving there the following year to devote himself to his studies, where he attended lectures by Antoine Laurent de Jussieu and Georges Cuvier, and started collecting old travel books.

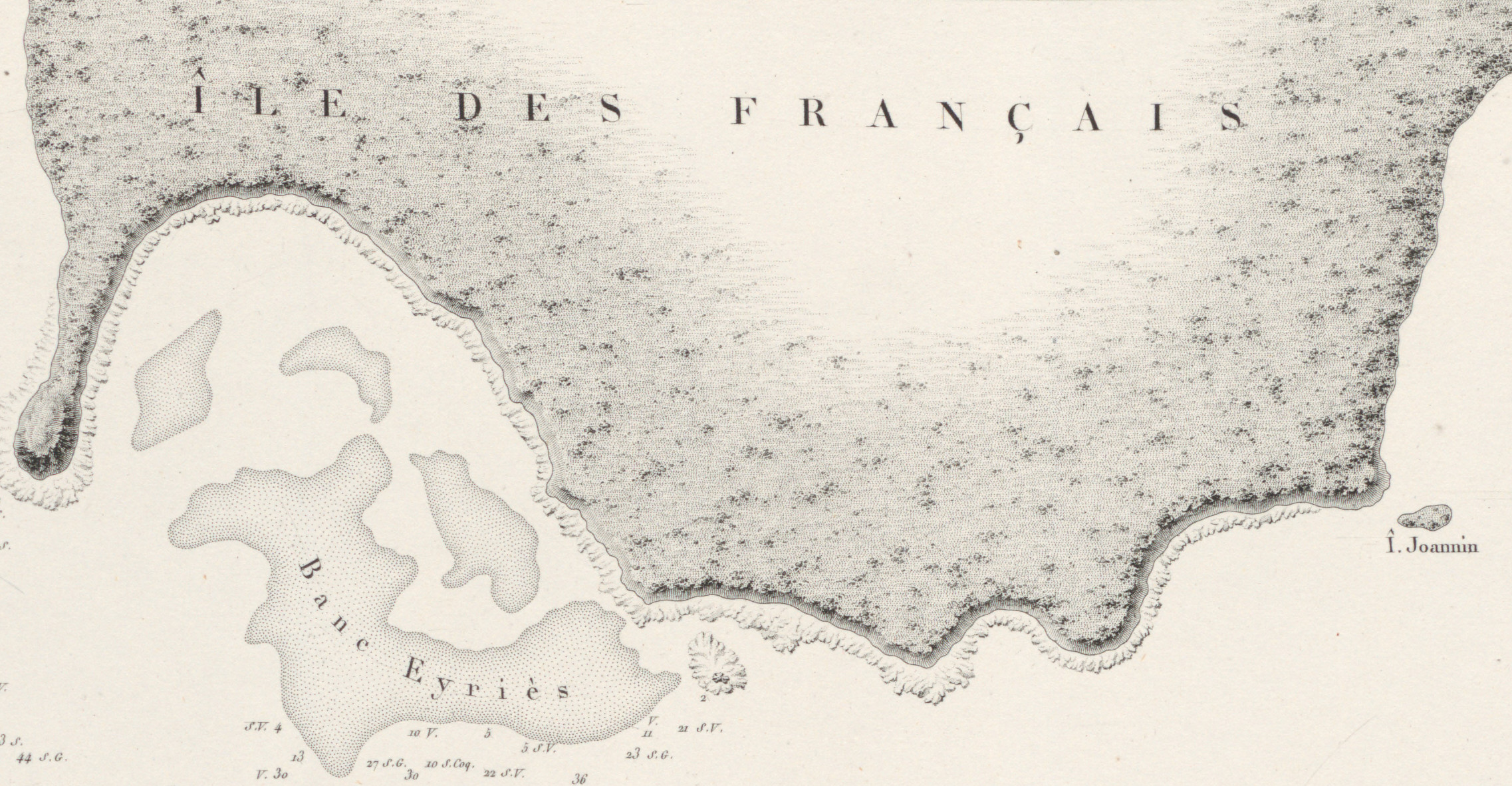
Banc Eyriès sandbank, south of French Island (Île des Français), Australia

He was given a mission in 1804–1805 by Charles Maurice de Talleyrand-Périgord and Napoleon to travel to Germany and rally the French emigrants there, chosen for his knowledge of the country and language and his discretion. He used the opportunity to continue his collection, but turned down the title "conseiller d’État" ('councillor of the State') to keep his independence, allowing him to devote himself entirely to geography and botany, and return to Paris to settle. As a speaker of nine languages, he translated many articles and books from German, English and Scandinavian languages into French, mostly on travel and geography, but also some fiction, such as Goethe's Elective Affinities, novels by August Lafontaine, and Fantasmagoriana, a selection of German ghost stories that he published anonymously in 1812. From that year he became one of the drafters of the Biographie Universelle under editor Joseph François Michaud, writing many articles for it up until his death. His quality as a translator and extensive scientific knowledge earned him the friendship and admiration of many respected scientists, notably including Alexander von Humboldt and Conrad Malte-Brun, the latter of whom he joined in 1819 to continue the publication of Nouvelles Annales des Voyages, de la Géographie et de l’Histoire, a journal dedicated to the advancement of the earth sciences.

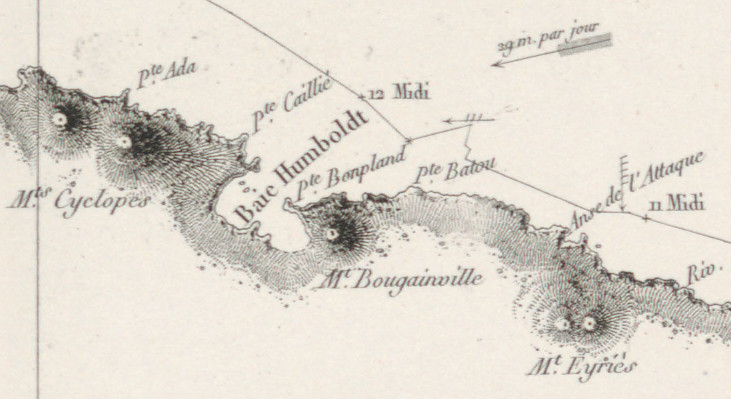
Mont Eyriès mountain, east of Yos Sudarso Bay (Baie Humboldt), New Guinea

In 1821 he became one of the two hundred and seventeen founding members of the world's first geographical society, the Société de Géographie, remaining one of the most active and on its central committee until his death; he was named honorary president, a prestigious title given to the likes of Pierre-Simon Laplace, Georges Cuvier, Alexander von Humboldt and François-René de Chateaubriand. The explorer Jules Dumont d'Urville named two landmarks after Eyriès during the first voyage of the Astrolabe (1826–1829): Banc Eyriès, a sandbank near French Island, Australia, and Mont Eyriès, a double-peaked mountain near Yos Sudarso Bay, New Guinea. He was admitted to the Académie des Inscriptions et Belles-Lettres in 1839, was elected a member of the American Philosophical Society in 1840 and a Foreign Honorary Member of the American Academy of Arts and Sciences in 1841, and was awarded the Legion of Honour in 1844.

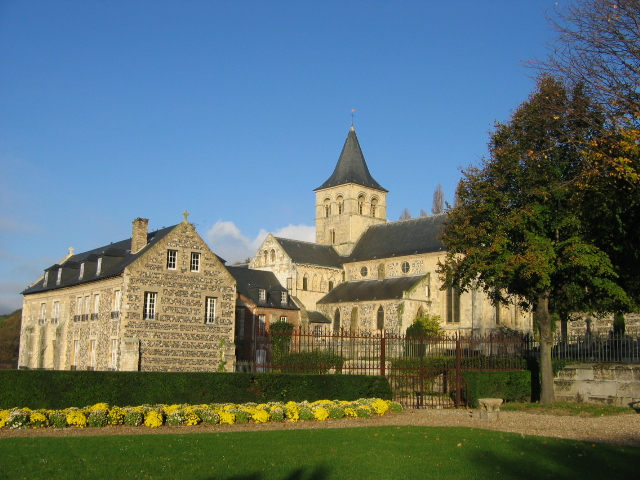
Graville Priory in Le Havre, where Eyriès was buried in 1846.

Eyriès suffered a stroke in 1844, rendering him incapable of further work, and died on 13 June 1846 at the house of his brother Alexandre Eyriès, the mayor of Graville near Le Havre, and was buried in the cemetery of Graville Priory, with an inscription on his tombstone after Edme François Jomard. He left a library of about 20,000 volumes collected throughout his life, which reflect his interest in rare and old works on travel and geography, and included almost everything written on Normandy, Le Havre and Provence, with rare maps from the German and Scandinavian countries, some of which are not even in the Bibliothèque nationale de France. Many of these books, and some of his manuscripts, remain as of 2006 in the municipal library of Le Havre, and a street "Rue Jean Baptiste Eyries" was named after him in the city. Eyriès was remembered by his contemporaries for his erudition, selfless dedication, prodigious memory, critical thinking and modesty, and Pierre Larousse wrote of him: "Many people still remember seeing a little old man in antiquated clothes, wearing a wide-brimmed hat and reading along the waterfront: that was Eyriès, who worked to fill his vast memory and his rich library at the same time."

== Bibliography ==
=== As author ===
- Costumes, moeurs et usages de tous les peuples, 11 volumes, 1821–1827
- Abrégé des Voyages Modernes Depuis 1780 Jusqu'à Nos Jours, 14 volumes, 1822–1824
- Recherches sur la population du globe terrestre, 1833
- Voyage pittoresque en Asie et en Afrique, résumé général des voyages anciens et modernes, 1839
- L'Univers, histoire et description de tous les peuples : Danemark, continued by Jean-Marie Chopin, 1846
- Dictionnaire de géographie ancienne et moderne, with E. G. Béraud, 1847

=== As contributor ===
- Biographie Universelle, contributor, 1812 ff.
- Voyage dans l'intérieur de l'Afrique, by Gaspard Théodore Mollien with an article by Eyriès, 2 volumes, 1820
- Voyage pittoresque autour du monde, avec des portraits de sauvages d'Amérique, d'Asie, d'Afrique, et des îles du grand Océan, by Louis Choris with text by Eyriès, 1 volume, 1822
- L'Encyclopédie moderne, contributor, 1824–1825
- Bibliomappe, ou Livre-cartes, textes analytiques, tableaux et cartes indiquant graduellement la géographie naturelle, les divisions géographiques, politiques, civiles, etc., les noms géographiques, historiques de tous les âges et de toutes les parties de l'univers, avec l'indication chronologique des découvertes des navigateurs, des changements survenus dans la circonscription des États, leurs dénominations, etc., with Jacques-Charles Bailleul and Pierre Claude François Daunou, 2 volumes, 1824–1826

=== As editor ===
- Jean-Louis-Hubert-Simon Deperthes: Histoire des naufrages, délaissements de matelots, hivernages, incendies de navires et autres désastres de mer, recueillis des plus authentiques relations, 3 volumes, 1815–1818
- Nouvelles Annales des Voyages, de la Géographie et de l’Histoire, periodical, 1819–?
- Jean-François de La Harpe: Abrégé de l'Histoire générale des voyages, 24 volumes, 1820
- Charles Cochelet: Naufrage du brick français La Sophie, perdu le 30 mai 1819 sur la côte occidentale d'Afrique, et captivité d'une partie des naufragés dans le désert du Sahara, avec de nouveaux renseignements sur la ville de Timectou, 2 volumes, 1821
- J. F. Bach: Introduction à la connaissance des montagnes, des vallées, des lacs et des rivières de la Suisse et des pays limitrophes, 1 volume, 1842

=== As translator ===
- William Robert Broughton: Voyage de découvertes dans la partie septentrionale de l'océan Pacifique, fait par le capitaine W. R. Broughton, pendant les années 1795, 1796, 1797 et 1798, 2 volumes, 1807
- Joachim Christoph Friedrich Schulz: Voyage en Pologne et en Allemagne fait en 1793 par un Livonien, où on trouve des détails très étendus sur la révolution de Pologne, en 1791 et en 1794, ainsi que la description de Varsovie, Dresde, Nurenberg, Vienne, Munich, etc., 2 volumes, 1807
- Alexander von Humboldt: Tableaux de la nature, 1808
- Johann Wolfgang von Goethe: Affinités électives, 3 volumes, 1810
- August Lafontaine: Aline de Riesenstein, 4 volumes, 1810
- August Lafontaine: Barneck et Saldorf: or, Le triomphe de l'amitié, 3 volumes, 1810
- Johann Friedrich Hugo von Dalberg: Mehaled et Sedli, histoire d'une famille druse, 2 volumes, 1812
- Johann Karl August Musäus, Johann August Apel, Friedrich Laun, and Heinrich Clauren: Fantasmagoriana; ou Recueil d'Histoires, d'Apparitions, de Spectres, Revenans, Fantômes, etc., traduit de l'allemand, par un amateur, anonymously, 2 volumes, 1812
- Karl Fischer, Heinrich Zschokke, Friedrich Laun, Ludwig Franz von Bilderbeck, August von Kotzebue, August Lafontaine, Ludwig Schubart, and J. Conrad: Nouveau recueil de contes traduits de l'allemand, 3 volumes, 1813
- James Morier: Voyage en Perse, en Arménie, en Asie-Mineure et à Constantinople, 3 volumes, 1813
- John Mawe: Voyages dans l'intérieur du Brésil, particulièrement dans les districts de l'or et du diamant, faits avec l'autorisation du prince régent de Portugal en 1809 et en 1810, contenant aussi un voyage au Rio-de-la-Plata et un essai historique sur la révolution de Buenos-Ayres, 1816
- Leopold von Buch: Voyage en Norvège et en Laponie, fait dans les années 1806, 1807 et 1808, 2 volumes, 1816
- John Aikin: Annales du règne de Georges III, depuis l'avènement de ce monarque jusqu'à la paix générale conclue en 1815, 3 volumes, 1817
- Vasili Mikhailovich Golovnin: Voyage de M. Golovnin, contenant le récit de sa captivité chez les Japonais, pendant les années 1811, 1812 et 1813, et ses observations sur l'Empire du Japon, suivi de la relation du voyage de M. Ricord, aux côtes du Japon en 1812 et 1813, 2 volumes, 1818
- Henry Pottinger: Voyages dans le Béloutchistan et le Sindhy, suivis de la description géographique et historique de ces deux pays, 2 volumes, 1818
- Francis Beaufort: Caramanie ou courte description de la côte méridionale de l'Asie mineure, 1 volume, 1820
- Adam Johann von Krusenstern: Voyage autour du monde fait dans les années 1803, 1804, 1805 et 1806, translation revised by Eyriès, 2 volumes, 1821
- Maximilian zu Wied-Neuwied: Voyage au Brésil dans les années 1815, 1816 et 1817, 3 volumes, 1821–1822
- Nikolay Muravyov-Karsky: Voyage en Turcomanie et à Khiva, fait en 1819 et 1820, translated by G. Lecointe de Laveau and revised by Eyriès and Julius Klaproth, 1 volume, 1823
- Edward Allen Talbot: Cinq années de séjour au Canada, 3 volumes, 1825
- Basil Hall: Voyage au Chili, au Pérou et au Mexique pendant les années 1820, 1821 et 1822, 2 volumes, 1825
- Alexander Gordon Laing: Voyage dans le Timanni, le Kouranko et le Soulimana, translated with Philippe François Lasnon de La Renaudière, 1826
- Dixon Denham, Hugh Clapperton, and Walter Oudney: Voyages et découvertes dans le Nord et dans les parties centrales de l'Afrique, translated with Philippe François Lasnon de La Renaudière, 3 volumes, 1826
- John Pinkerton: Abrégé de géographie moderne, ou Description historique, politique, civile et naturelle des empires, royaumes, états et leurs colonies, avec celle des mers et des îles de toutes les parties du monde, translated with Charles Athanase Walckenaer, 2 volumes, 1827
- Yegor Timkovsky: Voyage à Péking, à travers la Mongolie, en 1820 et 1821, translation revised by Eyriès, 2 volumes, 1827
- Hugh Clapperton: Second voyage dans l'intérieur de l'Afrique, depuis le golfe de Benin jusqu'à Sackatou, par le capitaine Clapperton, pendant les années 1825, 1826 et 1827, suivi du Voyage de Richard Lander, de Kano à la côte maritime, translated with Philippe François Lasnon de La Renaudière, 2 volumes, 1829
- Wilhelm Dorow: Voyage historique dans l'ancienne Étrurie, 1 volume, 1829
- Alexander Burnes: Voyages de l'embouchure de l'Indus à Lahor, Caboul, Balkh et à Boukhara; et retour par la Perse, 3 volumes, 1835
- Johann Ludwig Burckhardt: Voyages en Arabie, contenant la description des parties du Hedjaz regardées comme sacrées par les Musulmans, suivis de Notes sur les Bédouins et d'un Essai sur l'histoire des Wahabites, 3 volumes, 1835
- Michael Joseph Quin: Voyage sur le Danube de Pest à Roustchouk, 1836
