= Alfred Henry Miles =

English composer, lecturer, writer (1948–1929)

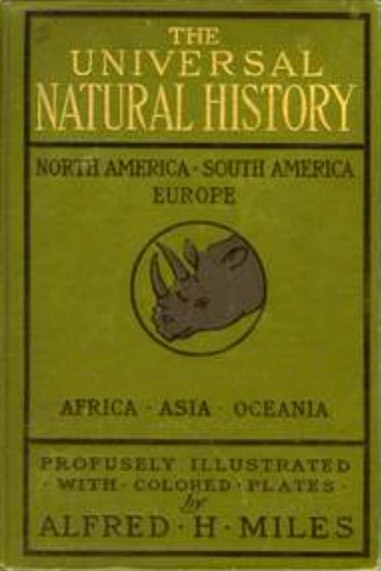

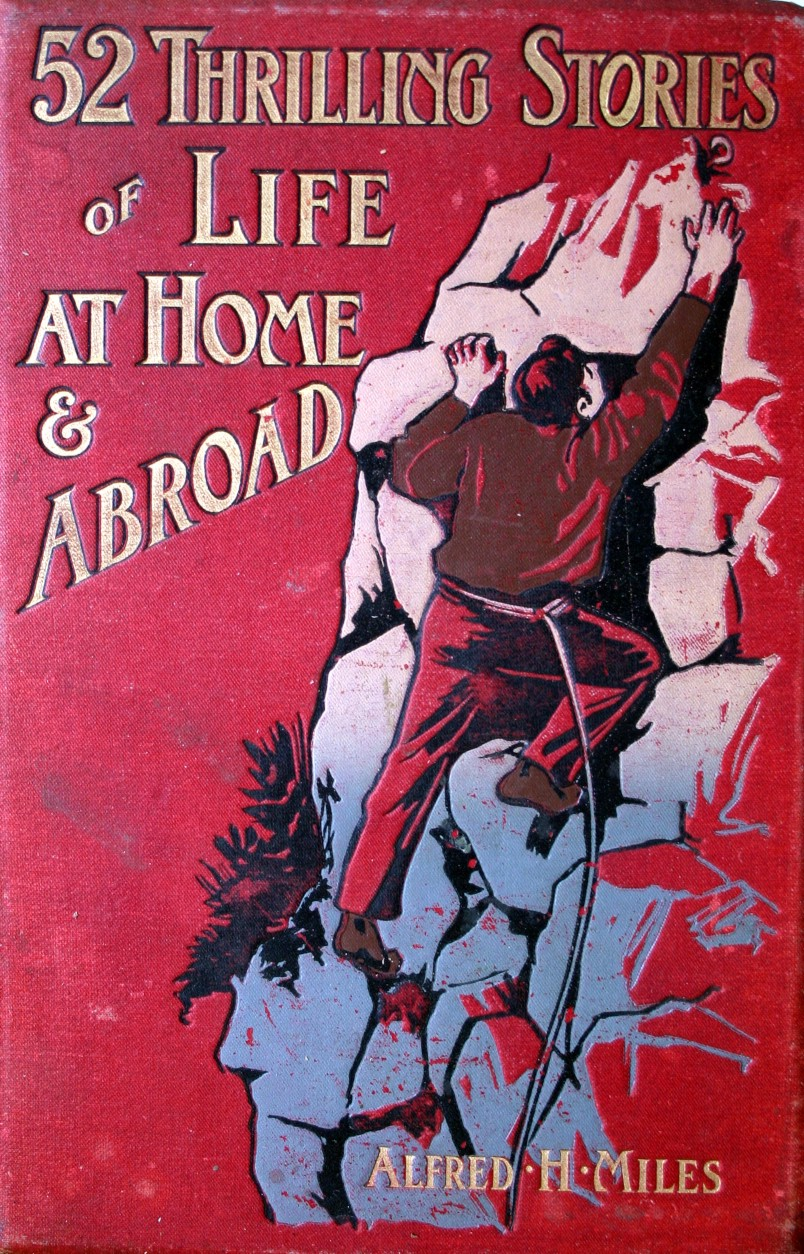

Alfred Henry Miles (26 February 1848 – 30 October 1929) was a prolific Victorian-era English writer – including as an anthologist, children's writer, editor, journalist, and poet – as well as a composer and lecturer.

He published hundreds of works on a wide range of topics, ranging from poetry (The Poets and the Poetry of the Century, 10 volumes. (London: Hutchinson, 1891)), warfare (Wars of the Olden Times, Abraham to Cromwell) to household encyclopaedias with information for every conceivable contingency (The Household Oracle: A Popular Referee on Subjects of Household Enquiry), and even advice to the lovelorn (Wooing: Stories of the Course That Never Did Run Smooth by R. E. Francillon and others. Issued as a volume in The Idle Hour Series, London: Hutchinson, [1891]).

He was Guardian of the Poor for six years and a member of the London Borough of Lewisham from 1904 to 1906.

He was editor of the Fifty-Two Library, a series of children's adventure stories published by Hutchinson & Co., London in the 19th century. He compiled some fifty volumes that appeared at five shillings apiece.

== Selected books ==
- The Fifty-Two Library [52v|1889–1907]
- The Poets and Poetry of the Century (ed.) [10v|p|1891–97]
- The Universal Natural History, with Anecdotes Illustrating the Nature, Habits, Manners and Customs of Animals, Birds, Fishes, Reptiles, Insects, etc., etc. edited by Alfred H. Miles, New York : Dodd, Mead and Co., 1895
- Successful Recitations (ed.) [1902]
- Log Leaves and Sailing Orders (ed.) [c|1902]
- Edward Hayes Plumptre to Selwyn Image: The Sacred Poets of the Nineteenth Century [b|1906]
- Christina G. Rossetti to Katharine Tynan (ed.) [1907]
- Drawing Room Entertainments [d|pub:1909]
- Ballads of Brave Women [1909]
- A Book of Brave Girls at Home and Abroad [n|1909]
- A Book of Brave Boys All the World Over [n|1909]
- The First Favourite Reciter (ed.) [1909]
- Original Poems, Ballads, and Tales in Verse [p|1910]
- The Sweep of the Sword [1910]
- Twixt Life and Death Opon Sea and Shore [1910]
- Heroines of the Home and the World of Duty [1910]
- A Garland of Verse for Young People [p|1911]
- The Diner's-Out Vade Mecum [n|1912]
- A Book of Brave Boys [n|?/1915]
- Heroes of History [1916]

== Poetry ==
Miles's poetry is unashamedly chauvinistic and strongly reminiscent of Rudyard Kipling.

"John Bull and His Island" (first verse)

There's a doughty little Island in the ocean,

The dainty little darling of the free;

That pulses with the patriots' emotion,

And the palpitating music of the sea:

She is first in her loyalty to duty;

She is first in the annals of the brave;

She is first in her chivalry and beauty,

And first in the succour of the slave!

Then here's to the pride of the ocean!

Here's to the pearl of the sea!

Here's to the land of the heart and the hand

That fight for the right of the free!

Here's to the spirit of duty,

Bearing her banners along--

Peacefully furled in the van of the world

Or waving and braving the wrong.

== See also ==
- List of children's literature writers
- List of English writers
- List of poets
- List of people from London
