= Johann Karl August Musäus =

German author (1735–1787)

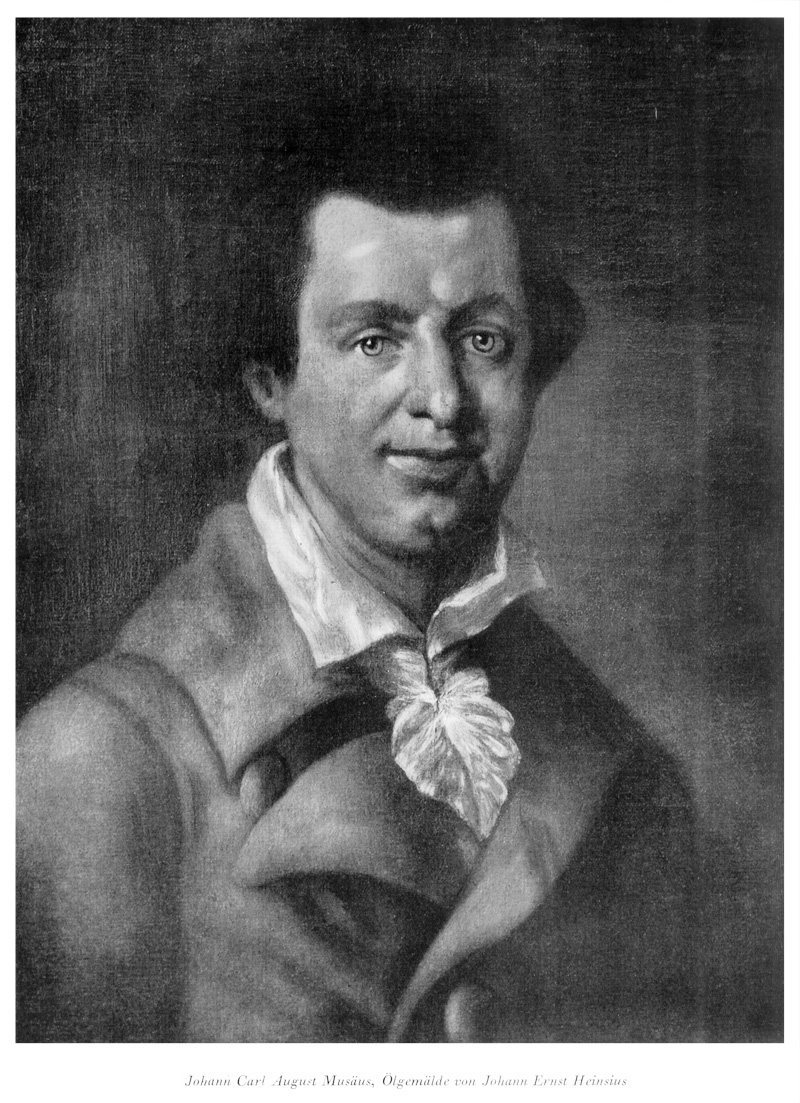

Johann Karl August Musäus (29 March 1735 – 28 October 1787) was a German author. He was one of the first collectors of German folk stories, most celebrated for his Volksmärchen der Deutschen (1782–1787), a collection of German fairy tales retold as satires.

== Biography ==
Born in Jena on 29 March 1735, the only son of Joseph Christoph Musäus, a judge. In 1743 his father became a councillor and police magistrate in Eisenach, and the young Musäus moved to live with his godfather and uncle Dr. Johann Weißenborn in Allstedt, who was entrusted with his education and treated Musäus like a son. He continued living with his uncle until he was nineteen years old, even when his uncle became general superintendent of Eisenach in 1744, a move which brought him to the same city as his parents again.

Musäus entered the University of Jena in 1754 to study theology (probably the choice of his godfather rather than his own), and was admitted into German Society around this time, a sign of more than ordinary merit. He received a Master's degree after the usual three and a half years of study, to add to the degree he had received honoris causa ten years earlier on 13 July 1747, and returned to Eisenach to wait for an appointment in the Church, which he was now licensed for. Despite preaching well, he was not especially devoted to religion, and received no appointment; when after several years he was offered a vacancy as pastor in the nearby countryside, the locals objected on the grounds that "he had once been seen dancing". This finished his hopes of a career in the church, and at the age of twenty-five he became an author of satire.

From 1760 to 1762, Musäus published in three volumes his first work, Grandison der Zweite (Grandison the Second), afterwards (in 1781–1782) rewritten and issued with a new title, Der deutsche Grandison (The German Grandison). The object of this book was to satirize Samuel Richardson's hero Sir Charles Grandison, who had many sentimental admirers in the Holy Roman Empire.

In 1763 Musäus was made tutor of the court pages in Weimar, and in 1769 he became professor of Ancient Languages and History at the Wilhelm-Ernst-Gymnasium in Weimar. He became a Freemason in July 1776 at the "Amalia" lodge in Weimar, and became a member of the Bavarian Illuminati in August 1783, taking the names "Priscillianus" and "Dante Alighieri", and becoming presbyter that year. Musäus was an amateur actor, and introduced his nephew August von Kotzebue to the theatre, as well as acting alongside Johann Wolfgang von Goethe in the latter's early verse comedy Die Mitschuldigen (1777). Due to his sociable nature, he was held in high regard in Weimar.

His second book, Physiognomische Reisen, did not appear until 1778/79. It was directed against Lavater, and attracted much favorable attention. From 1782 to 1787, he published his best work, Volksmärchen der Deutschen, a collection of German fairy tales. Even in this series of tales, the substance of which Musäus collected among the people, he could not refrain from satire. The stories, therefore, lack the simplicity of genuine folk-lore. In 1785, was issued Freund Heins Erscheinungen in Holbeins Manier by Johann Rudolph Schellenberg, with explanations in prose and verse by Musäus. He was prevented from completing a collection of stories entitled Straussfedern (though one volume was published in 1787) by his death on 28 October 1787, aged 52, in Weimar, where he is buried in the Jacobsfriedhof.

== Legacy ==
Musäus's Nachgelassene Schriften (1791) were published posthumously, edited by his relative, August von Kotzebue. The Straussfedern continued to be published by the bookseller Christoph Friedrich Nicolai, with contributions by Ludwig Tieck (1795–1798).

Musäus's Volksmärchen were an early part of the revived interest in fairy tales (which had declined since their late-17th century peak) caused by the rise of romanticism and Romantic nationalism. This trend continued in the nineteenth century and included others, such as Benedikte Naubert and the Brothers Grimm. They had an important influence on Hans Christian Andersen.

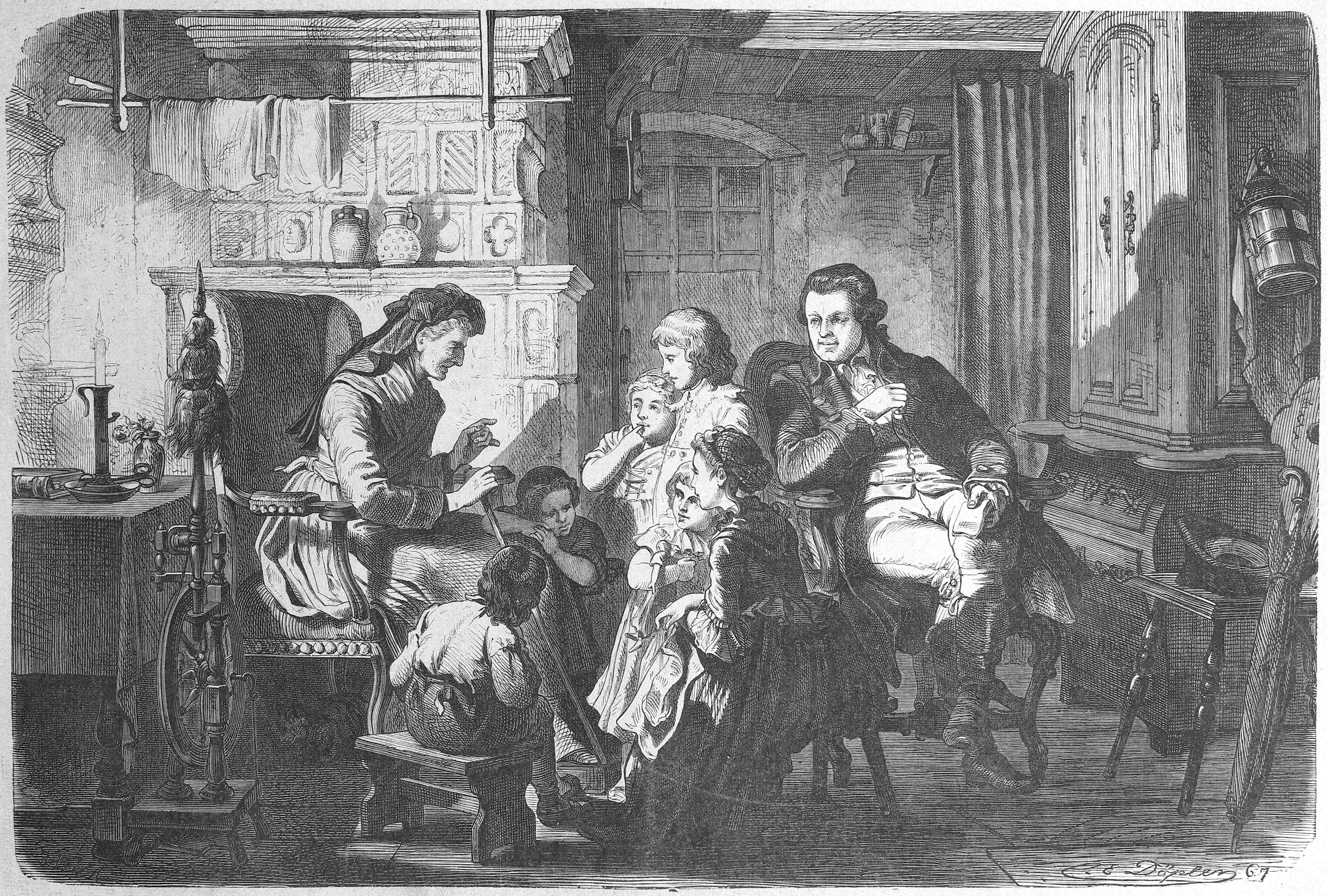
Musäus collecting folk stories, by C. E. Döpler

The Volksmärchen have been frequently reprinted (Düsseldorf, 1903, etc.) and translated. Five of the tales were translated into English by Thomas Beddoes as Popular Tales of the Germans (1791), and three were included in German Romance (1827) translated by Thomas Carlyle. They were also translated into French a number of times, including as Contes populaires des Allemands (1803) by J. Lefèvre, a translation of two of the stories by Isabelle de Montolieu (1803), and another complete translation with an introduction by Charles Paul de Kock (1826) among others.

The last of the "Legenden von Rübezahl" ('Legends of Rübezahl') in the Volksmärchen was said by Henry A. Pochmann and others to have inspired the Headless Horseman of Washington Irving's "The Legend of Sleepy Hollow" (1820).

Another of the Volksmärchen, "Der geraubte Schleier" ("The Stolen Veil"), a tale about a Swan maiden, was used by Pyotr Ilyich Tchaikovsky to provide the plot outline of Swan Lake (1876), though the extent of Tchaikovsky's use of Musäus's story is challenged by some such as Russian ballet patriarch Fyodor Lopukhov, who argue the ballet is essentially Russian.

One of the Volksmärchen translated into French ("Stumme Liebe" translated as "L'Amour Muet") was contained in Jean-Baptiste Benoît Eyriès's Fantasmagoriana (1812) along with seven other German ghost-stories. This collection was read by Lord Byron, Percy Bysshe Shelley, Mary Shelley, Claire Clairmont and John William Polidori in the summer of 1816, and inspired them to try to write their own ghost-stories. Lord Byron wrote a fragment of a novel that is considered the first modern vampire story, Polidori wrote The Vampyre based on this, and Mary Shelley went on to write Frankenstein. Five of the eight stories in Fantasmagoriana were translated into English by Sarah Elizabeth Utterson as Tales of the Dead (1813), including an abridged form of "Stumme Liebe" as "The Spectre-Barber".

His collected folk tales continue to be adapted, such as the story of Libussa and Premysl in the 2009 film The Pagan Queen.

An asteroid discovered on 6 April 1989 was named 10749 Musäus, after him.
