= Jean Middlemass =

English novelist

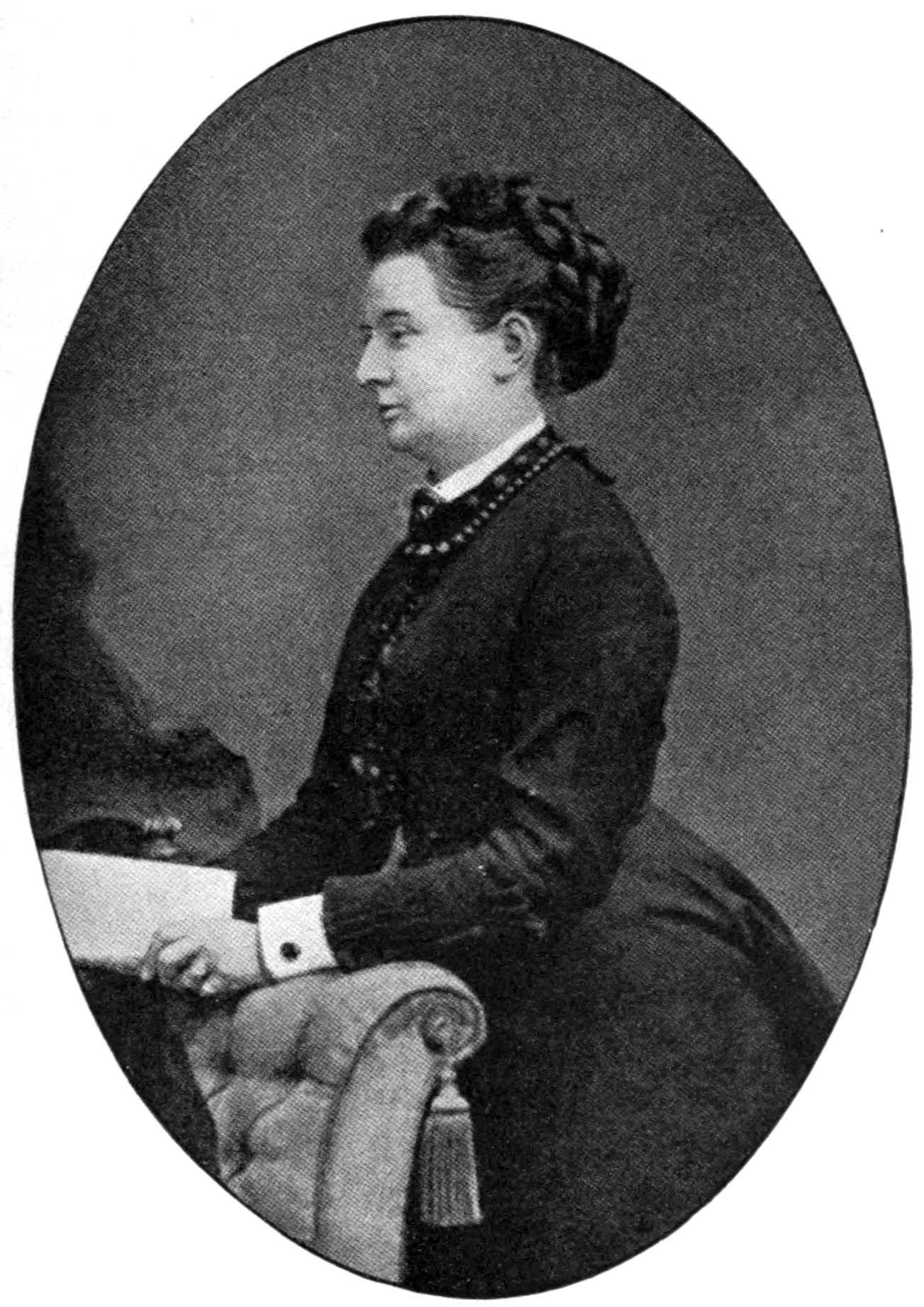
- Born: 1834
- Died: 1919 (aged 84–85)
- Occupation: Editor, novelist

Mary Jane (Jean) Middlemass (pen name, Mignionette; 14 July 1833 – 4 November 1919) was an English novelist.

Middlemass was the daughter of Robert Hume Middlemass (of the Westbarns of Haddington), and Mary Porter in Marylebone, London, England. Her father taught her Greek and Latin and encouraged her to write for a privately circulated magazine.

Her first works were published under the pseudonym "Mignionette", by her father in 1851. She published prolifically from the 1870s through to when her last book was published in 1910, and was one of the authors of the collaborative work The Fate of Fenella.

She died in 1919. In 2023 the Oxford Dictionary of National Biography included her, Mrs. Disney Leith, Florence L. Barclay, Gabrielle Wodnil and Bessie Marchant in new biographies of eleven Victorian writers who have caught the attention of academics.

== Works ==
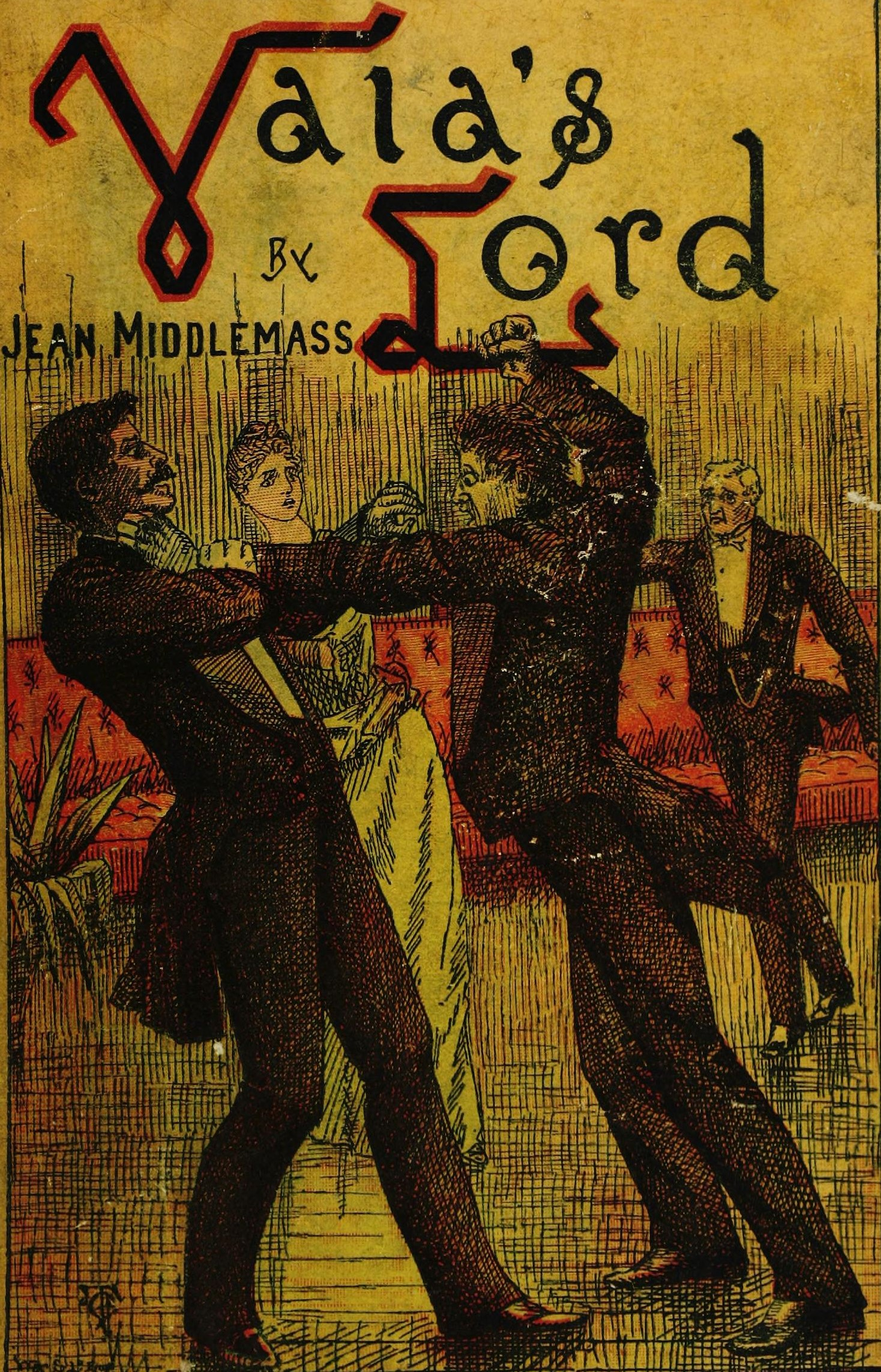
1889 Yellow-back cover of Vaia's Lord

- Lil (London, 1872)
- Wild Georgie (London, 1873)
- Baiting the Trap: a novel (London, 1875)
- Mr Dorillion: a novel (London, 1876)
- Touch and Go (London, 1877)
- Innocence at Play: a novel (London, 1880)
- Sealed by a Kiss: a novel (London, 1880)
- Sackcloth and Broadcloth: a novel (London, 1881)
- Four in Hand: a novel (London, 1881)
- Poisoned Arrows: a novel (London, 1884)
- A Girl in a Thousand: a novel (London, 1885)
- The Loadstone of Love: a novel (London, 1886)
- Nelly Jocelyn, Widow: a novel (London, 1887)
- Vaia's Lord: a novel (London, 1889)
- Two False Moves: a novel (London, 1890)
- Hush Money (London, 1895)
- She's Fooling Thee! (London, 1895)
- Vengeance is Mine: a novel (London, 1895)
- Blanche Coningham's Surrender: a tale (London, 1898)
- In Storm and Strife: a novel (London, 1899).
- The Yellow Badge (London, 1899)
- His Lawful Wife (London, 1901)
- A Wheel of Fire (London, 1901)
- Fallen from Favour (London, 1902)
- A Woman's Calvary (London, 1903)
- Count Reminy (London, 1905)
- A Felon's Daughter (London, 1906)
- A Veneered Scamp (London, 1906)
- An Evil Angel (London, 1908)
- Mignon's Peril (London, 1909)
- Loves Old and New (London, 1909)
- At the Altar Steps (London, 1910)
