= Mrs. Disney Leith =

Mary Charlotte Julia Gordon
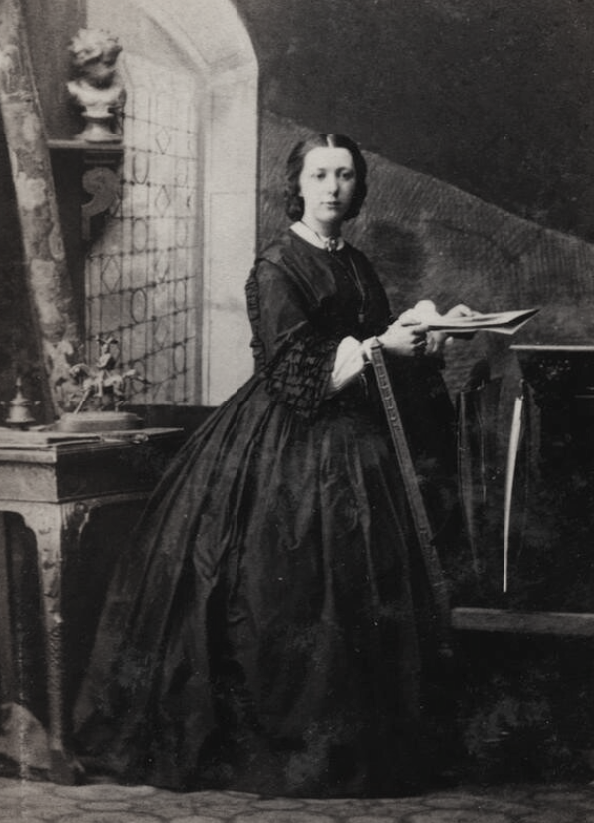
- Born: Mary Charlotte Julia Gordon; 9 July 1840
- Died: 21 February 1926 (aged 85); Niton, Isle of Wight
- Other name: Mrs. Disney Leith
- Occupation: writer
- Spouse: General Robert William Disney Leith CB
- Children: six

Mary Charlotte Julia Leith, née Gordon (1840–1926), best known as Mrs Disney Leith, was a British novelist and traveller, as well as a childhood friend and cousin of the poet Algernon Swinburne. After her husband's death she visited Iceland numerous times, writing about the country and translating works from Icelandic.

== Life ==
Leith was born Mary Charlotte Julia Gordon, in 1840, in London, and was the daughter of Mary Agnes Blanche (born Ashburnham) and Sir Henry Percy Gordon, Bart. Her father had been a leading mathematician when he was at Cambridge. Her grandfathers were General Sir James Willoughby Gordon and George Ashburnham, the Earl of Ashburnham. She was brought up in the family seat of Northcourt House at Shorwell on the Isle of Wight, a mansion that stood inside its own park.

Her first cousin was the poet Algernon Charles Swinburne, who lived nearby on the Isle of Wight. He was frail but "fired with nervous energy and fearlessness to the point of being reckless." They went riding and wrote Jacobean plays together in the library at Northcourt. She was educated at home, mastering several languages in addition to ancient Greek and Latin. She learned mathematics and was a talented pianist and organist.

Leith and Swinburne secretly collaborated on her second book, Children of the Chapel, which is about a ten year old chorister in the 16th century. The co-authorship was not revealed until after Swinburne had died.

On 14 July 1865 she married the first commander of the 106th Regiment of Foot of the Bombay Light Infantry, Colonel Robert William Disney Leith. He had lost an arm, and gained a bullet and several sabre cuts during the Siege of Multan in 1849. The coded correspondence between herself and Swinburne ceased until her husband's death.

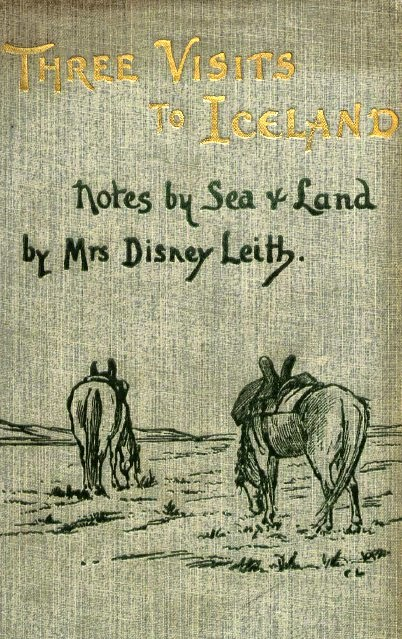
Three Visits to Iceland by Mrs Disney Leith

Her husband, then a General and a Companion of the Bath, died at their home, Northcourt, on 20 June 1892. His death seems to have allowed change. She decided to visit Iceland which was a country that she long been intrigued by.

In 1908 Leith published her book about her many visits to Iceland. The book featured twelve watercolours by herself and M. A. Wemyss. Her last three novels were part of a family saga advocating Christian values and knowing your place. The first was Champion Sandy in 1910, then Black Martinmas two years later and the last Lachlan’s Widow in 1913. They were all anonymous as distinct from her 1917 work which remains well known under her nom de plume of "Mrs. Disney Leith". The Boyhood of Algernon Charles Swinburne, published in America and London, was based on her memories and their surviving letters.

She died in 1926. In 2023 the Oxford Dictionary of National Biography included her, Jean Middlemass, Florence L. Barclay, Gabrielle Wodnil and Bessie Marchant in new biographies of eleven Victorian writers who have caught the attention of academics.
