= The Mistress of Shenstone =

The Mistress of Shenstone may refer to:

- The Mistress of Shenstone (novel), a 1910 romance novel by Florence L. Barclay
- The Mistress of Shenstone (film), a 1921 silent film based on the novel
