= A Modern Picture Gallery =

Painting by William Frederick Witherington

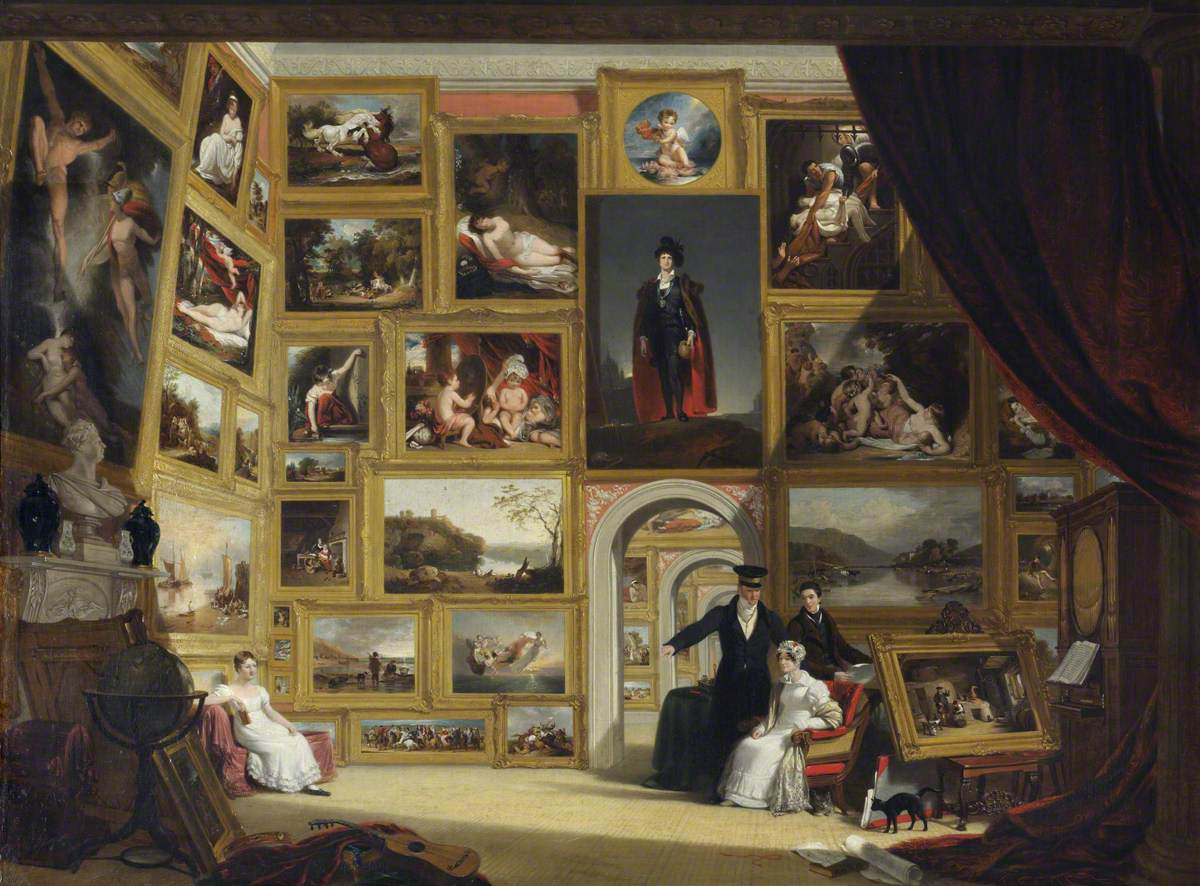
- Artist: William Frederick Witherington
- Year: 1824
- Type: Oil on canvas
- Dimensions: 69.2 cm × 90.2 cm (27.2 in × 35.5 in)
- Location: National Trust, Wimpole Hall

A Modern Picture Gallery is an 1824 painting by the British artist William Frederick Witherington. It depicts a fictitious art gallery envisaged by Witherington, hung with many British paintings of the eighteenth and early nineteenth centuries. Its conception is similar to The Tribuna of the Uffizi by Johan Zoffany, who created a display of Old Masters that didn't reflect the real layout of the Uffizi gallery. Significantly, Witherington's work was produced the same year that the National Gallery opened in London. The Prime Minister Lord Liverpool had insisted that any national gallery would be filled by historic works by Old Masters rather than more recent British works.

The gallery space is entirely imaginary and the real works meticulously recreated belonged to numerous different private collections. With the notable exception of Thomas Lawrence's John Philip Kemble as Hamlet the genre of fashionable portrait paintings, which dominated the art market at the time, is excluded. Instead the rooms are filled by history paintings and genre paintings, the latter of which Witherington himself specialised in. The inclusion of so much recent work, much of it by Royal Academicians, may have been intended as a riposte to the real National Gallery.

Around half of the thirty or so visible paintings have been identified including Thomas Gainsborough's The Harvest Wagon, Richard Wilson's View on the Arno, John Hoppner's Sleeping Nymph and Cupid John Opie's Damon and Musidora, Joshua Reynolds' The Infant Academy, David Wilkie's The Whiskey Still at Lochgilphead and Turner's Sun Rising through Vapour. A bust of George IV sits over the mantlepiece. The people depicted are James Willoughby Gordon and his wife Julia Lavinia as well as their children, Henry and Julia Emily Gordon, themselves both artists.

It was exhibited at the Royal Academy's Summer Exhibition of 1824 at Somerset House in 1824 as well as at the British Institution. It is now in the collection of the National Trust at Wimpole Hall in Cambridgeshire.

== See also ==
- Gallery of the Louvre, an 1833 painting by Samuel Morse depicting an Idealised view of paintings in the Louvre

== Bibliography ==
- Cale, Luisa. Fuseli's Milton Gallery: 'Turning Readers into Spectators'. Clarendon Press, 2006.
- Conlin, Jonathan. The Nation's Mantelpiece: A History of the National Gallery. Pallas Athene, 2006.
