= Gallery of the Louvre =

Painting by Samuel Morse

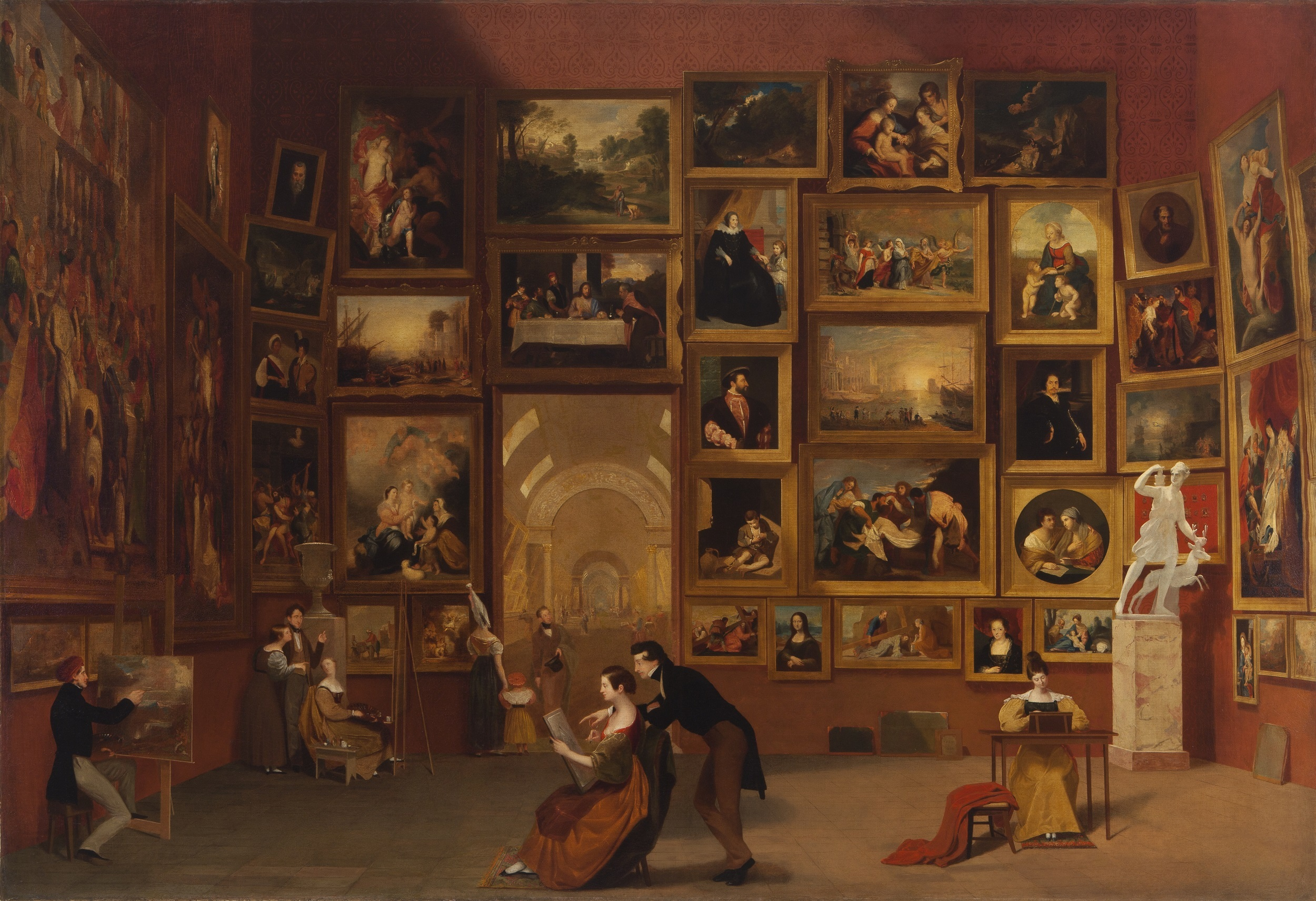
- Artist: Samuel Morse
- Year: 1831–1833
- Type: Oil on canvas
- Dimensions: 187.3 cm × 274.3 cm (73.7 in × 108.0 in)
- Location: Terra Foundation for American Art

Gallery of the Louvre is an 1833 oil painting by the American artist Samuel Morse. It depicts a view of the Louvre in Paris.

Morse had trained in London. On returning to the United States he developed a reputation as a portraitist including his 1819 depiction of James Monroe However, he is better known today as an inventor who gave his name to the Morse Code.

Morse visited France in 1831-32, having previously been in Rome. Morse regularly visited the Louvre to copy Old Masters on display there. He spent fourteen months working on the large painting. Included in the painting are Morse's friends the author James Fenimore Cooper, his daughter Susan and the sculptor Horatio Greenough. The Coopers were in Paris while Morse was working on the painting

A total of 38 artworks are visible, comprising what Morse felt were the best in the museum's collection. Although these works were in fact spread across the Louvre, Morse imagines them all in the iconic Salon Carré. They include the Mona Lisa by Leonardo da Vinci, La belle jardinière by Raphael, The Young Beggar by Bartolomé Esteban Murillo and The Wedding at Cana by Paolo Veronese.

On his return to the United States, Morse exhibited the painting but although appreciated by artists and connoisseurs, the response of the public was poor and it was a commercial failure. Today the painting is in the collection of the Terra Foundation for American Art. In 2012 it was exhibited at the National Gallery of Art in Washington and at Yale University Art Gallery.

== See also ==
- A Modern Picture Gallery, an 1824 painting by William Frederick Witherington that also portrays an idealised collection of paintings

== Bibliography ==
- Kurth, Rosaly Torna. Susan Fenimore Cooper: New Perspectives on Her Works. 2016.
- McCullough, David. The Greater Journey: Americans in Paris. Simon and Schuster, 2012.
- Silverman, Kenneth. Lightning Man: The Accursed Life of Samuel F.B. Morse. Knopf Doubleday, 2012.
