= John Philip Kemble as Hamlet =

1801 painting by Thomas Lawrence

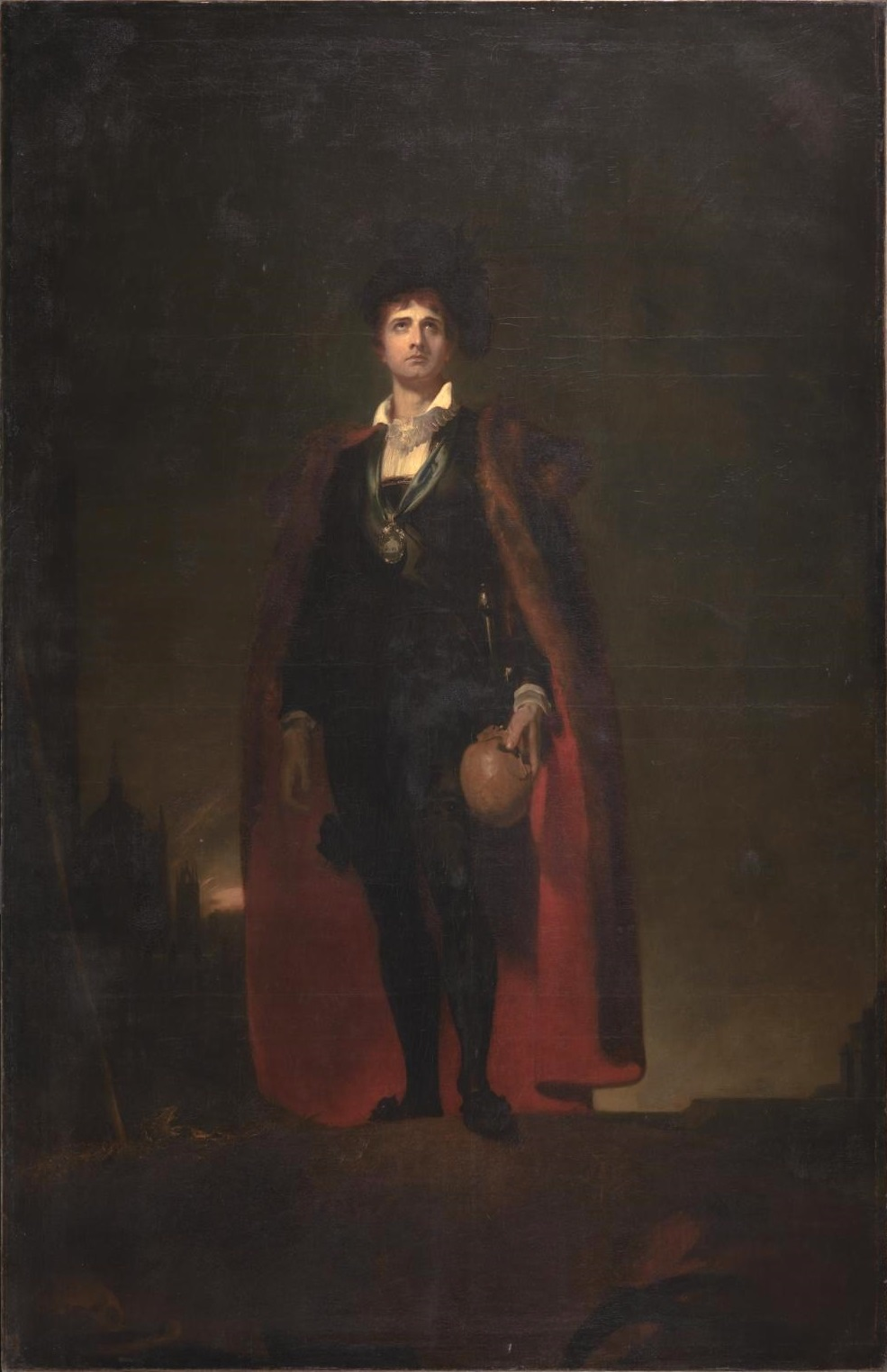
- Artist: Thomas Lawrence
- Year: 1801
- Type: Oil on canvas, portrait painting
- Dimensions: 777 cm × 503 cm (306.1 in × 198.1 in)
- Location: Tate Britain, London

John Philip Kemble as Hamlet is an oil on canvas portrait painting by the English artist Thomas Lawrence, from 1801. It depicts the British actor John Philip Kemble in the title role of William Shakespeare's play Hamlet.

== History and description ==
Kemble is shown holding the skull of Yorick from Act 5, Scene 1 of the play. The work is designed to capture both the dignified nobility of the character but also of the actor who played him, one of the leading British actors of the era.

It was one of four portraits Lawrence was eventually to paint of Kemble in prominent acting roles including his 1812 John Philip Kemble as Cato. The painting was displayed at the Royal Academy's Summer Exhibition of 1801 at Somerset House. Today the work is in the collection of the Tate Britain in Pimlico, having been presented to the National Gallery by William IV in 1836.

The painting is featured in William Frederick Witherington's 1824 painting A Modern Picture Gallery, an idealised national gallery in which Lawrence's work is the only portrait on display.

== Bibliography ==
- Levenson, Jill L. & Ormsby, Robert (ed.) The Shakespearean World. Taylor & Francis, 2017.
- Ritchie, Fiona & Escolme, Bridget. Shakespeare in the Theatre: Sarah Siddons and John Philip Kemble. Bloomsbury Publishing, 2022.
- Young, Alan R. Hamlet and the visual arts, 1709-1900. University of Delaware Press, 2002.
