= View on the Arno =

Painting by Richard Wilson

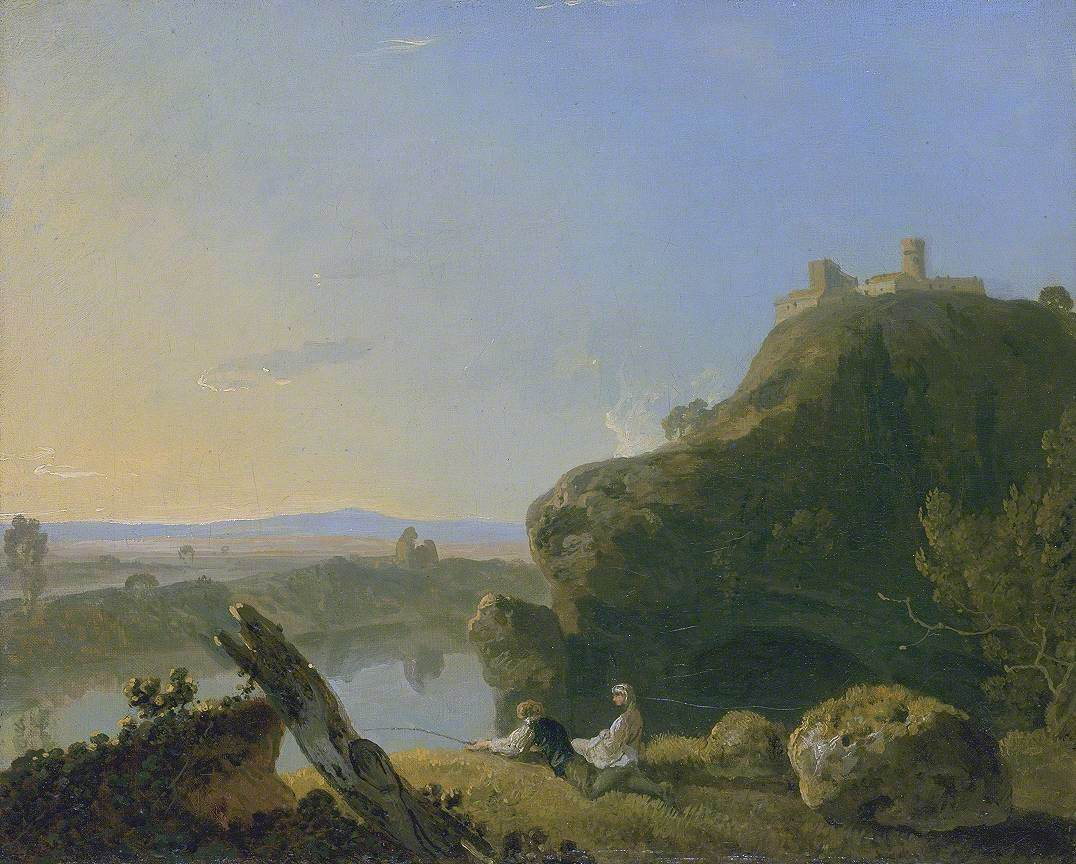
- Version in the Tate Britain
- Artist: Richard Wilson
- Year: c.1760
- Type: Oil on canvas, landscape painting
- Dimensions: 90.2 cm × 125.1 cm (35.5 in × 49.3 in)
- Location: Petworth House, Sussex

View on the Arno is a c.1760 landscape painting by the British artist Richard Wilson. It depicts an idyllic view on the River Arno in Tuscany. The Welsh-born Wilson spent seven years in Italy where his style altered distinctly. Wilson produced over thirty variations of this scene, one of his most popular. He described compositions such as this as "good breeders" as they could be repeated. A large version of the painting is part of the collection of Petworth House in Sussex, now under the control of the National Trust. It was likely acquired by the art collector the Earl of Egremont and was displayed at the British Institution in 1814. The Museum of Fine Arts in Boston holds another notable version.

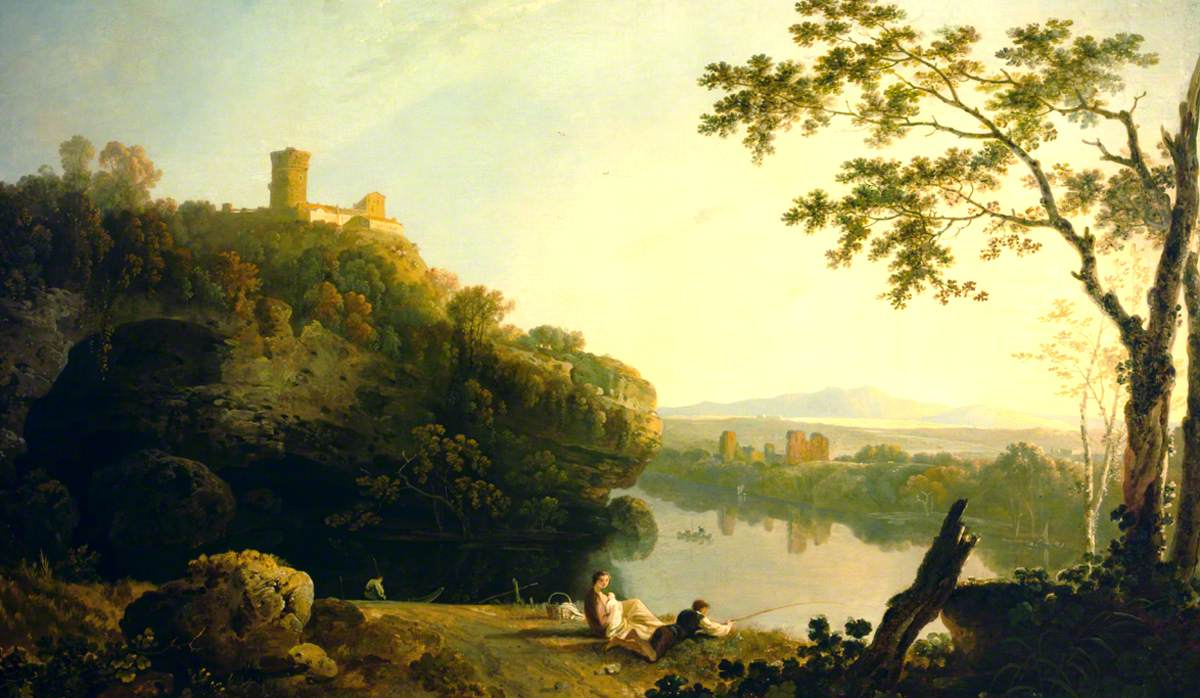
A Summer Evening River View or View on the Arno, 1765, now in the Southampton Art Gallery.

Another, different painting of the Arno, produced around 1765, is now in the Southampton Art Gallery having once belonged to Baron de Tabley. The Southampton painting is amongst those featured in William Frederick Witherington's 1824 work A Modern Picture Gallery featuring an idealised depiction of pictures by leading British artists.

== Bibliography ==
- Hermann, Luke. British Landscape Painting of the Eighteenth Century. Oxford University Press, 1974.
- Solkin, David H. Richard Wilson: The Landscape of Reaction. Tate Gallery, 1982.
