= Florence L. Barclay =

English writer

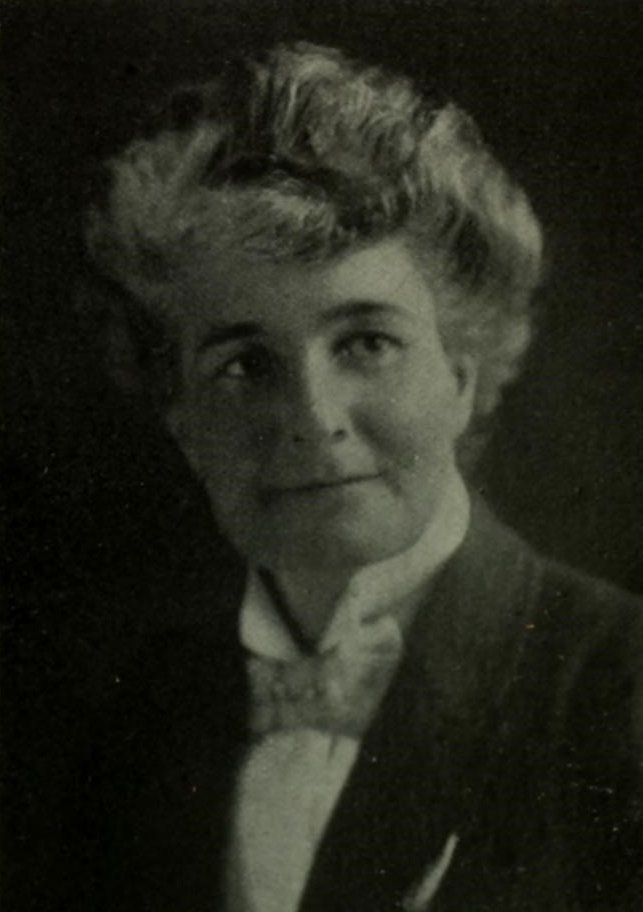
- Born: Florence Louisa Charlesworth; 2 December 1862; St Helier, Jersey, Channel Islands
- Died: 10 March 1921 (aged 58)
- Occupation: Author

Florence Louisa Barclay (2 December 1862 – 10 March 1921) was an English romance novelist and short story writer.

== Biography ==
She was born Florence Louisa Charlesworth on the island of Jersey. Her parents were Maria Amelia (born Beddome) and Samuel Beddome Charlesworth. Her father was the Anglican rector of Limpsfield, Surrey, and that is where she was baptised. The second of three girls, she was a sister to Maud Ballington Booth, the Salvation Army leader and co-founder of the Volunteers of America. When Florence was seven years old, the family moved to Limehouse in the London Borough of Tower Hamlets.

In 1881, Florence Charlesworth abandoned the idea of a musical career and she married the Rev. Charles W. Barclay who was her father's retiring curate. They honeymooned in the Holy Land, where, in Shechem, they reportedly discovered Jacob's Well, the place where, according to the Gospel of St John, Jesus met the woman of Samaria. Florence Barclay and her husband settled in Hertford Heath, in Hertfordshire, where she was more outgoing than her husband. She played the organ, swam and cycled and ran Friday night entertainments. bible classes and mother's meetings. She became the mother of eight children. Besides the organ she continued her musical interest by taking singing lessons with the French opera singer Blanche Marchesi.

In her early forties health problems left her bedridden for a time and she passed the hours by writing what became her first romance novel titled The Wheels of Time. Her next novel, The Rosary, a story of undying love, was published in 1909 and its success eventually resulted in its being translated into eight languages and made into five motion pictures, also in several languages. The novel was the No.1 bestselling novel of 1910 in the United States. The enduring popularity of the book was such that more than twenty-five years later, Sunday Circle magazine serialized the story and in 1926 the prominent French playwright Alexandre Bisson adapted the book as a three-act play for the Parisian stage.

Florence Barclay wrote eleven books in all, including a work of non-fiction. Her novel The Mistress of Shenstone (1910) was made into a silent film of the same title in 1921. Her short novel Under the Mulberry Tree appeared in the Ladies Home Journal from April through September 1911.

Florence Barclay died in 1921 at the age of fifty-eight while undergoing surgery. The Life of Florence Barclay: a study in personality was published anonymously that year by G. P. Putnam's Sons "by one of Her Daughters." In 2023 the Oxford Dictionary of National Biography included her, Mrs. Disney Leith, Gabrielle Wodnil and Bessie Marchant in new biographies of eleven Victorian writers who have caught the attention of academics.

== Bibliography ==
- Guy Mervyn (1891) under the pen-name of Brandon Roy (revised by one of her daughters in 1932)
- The Wheels of Time (1908)
- The Rosary (1909)
- The Mistress of Shenstone (1910)
- The Following of the Star (1911)
- Through the Postern Gate (1911)
- The Upas Tree (1912)
- The Broken Halo (1913)
- The Wall of Partition (1914)
- The Golden Censer (1914)
- My Heart's Right There (1914)
- In Hoc Vince: The Story of the Red Cross Flag (1915) (non-fiction)
- The White Ladies of Worcester (1917)
- Returned Empty (1920)
- Shorter Works (1923) collection of short stories and articles published posthumously

== Film adaptations ==
- The Mistress of Shenstone, directed by Henry King (1921, based on the novel The Mistress of Shenstone)
- Le Rosaire, directed by Tony Lekain (France, 1934, based on the novel The Rosary)
- El rosario, directed by Juan José Ortega (Mexico, 1944, based on the novel The Rosary)
