= The Mistress of Shenstone (novel) =

1910 novel

- Author: Florence L. Barclay
- Language: English
- Genre: Romance
- Publisher: Putnam's
- Publication date: 1910
- Publication place: United Kingdom
- Media type: Print

The Mistress of Shenstone is a 1910 romance novel by the British writer Florence L. Barclay. It was published in London and New York City by Putnam's. Barclay had enjoyed great success with her previous novel The Rosary which topped the annual Publishers Weekly bestsellers list.

== Film adaptation ==
It was adapted into a 1921 American silent film of the same title directed by Henry King and starring Pauline Frederick and Roy Stewart.

== Bibliography ==
- Goble, Alan. The Complete Index to Literary Sources in Film. Walter de Gruyter, 1999.
- Henderson, Lesley & Kirkpatrick, Lesley D. L. Twentieth-century Romance and Historical Writers. St. James Press, 1990
- Hipsky, Martin. Modernism and the Women's Popular Romance in Britain, 1885–1925. Ohio University Press, 2011.
- Waller, Philip. Writers, Readers, and Reputations: Literary Life in Britain 1870–1918. Oxford University Press, 2008.
