= Gabrielle Wodnil =

British novelist and songwriter (1880–1933)

Ella Lindow
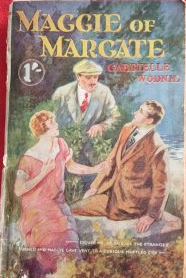
- her 1912 novel
- Born: Ella Lindow; 12 February 1880; Islington
- Died: 27 April 1933 (aged 53); Hampstead
- Occupations: songwriter and novelist

Ella Lindow aka Gabrielle Wodnil and Ella Wodnil (12 February 1880 – 27 April 1933) was a British novelist and songwriter.

== Life ==
Lindow was born in 1880 in Islington. She was the only child of Angelina (born Levy in London) and her Russian born husband Joseph Lindow. Her father dealt in diamonds and he had been married before, giving her seven elder half-siblings who had been born in America and Germany.

She had two successful careers and the first was in music. She used the name "Gabrielle Wodnil" (Lindow spelt backwards) for her songs and her writing. After her skills as a pianist gained her the Royal Academy of Music's bronze medal, she tried writing, performing and writing songs. By 1906 she was performing in variety and successfully selling her songs. The pantomime and Edwardian musical comedy star Evie Greene took up her song "Yet, if I Said, Forgive" and other notable songs were "Lapland", "Just a Snapshot" and "Won't You Come Rinking?". She believed that great songs made great pantomimes and by 1910 she was writing about pantomimes and the conventional theatre.

In 1912 she published her first novel as "Gabrielle Wodnil" with the title Maggie of Margate: a Seaside Sensation, which fitted in with a trend to have alliterative titles that included the name of a resort reachable on the railway. The novel involved Mike Bhear who believes that money can buy him nearly anything he wants and his young maid who expects more respect than she gets. The maid is actually Lady Margaret Taunton but the boss does not know that and she says "Oh Sir you mustn't talk like that with you a real gentleman and me just a poor girl". Mike's offer to Maggie includes a career on the stage in the musical theatre. The beach novel includes a reference to "Evie Green" singing "Yet, if I Said, Forgive" but the link between Wodnil as a songwriter and Wodnil as a novelist does not appear to have been spotted.

Wodnil's next novel in 1913 also alluded to the seaside, holidays and romance. It was titled Brineta ar Brighton: A Boarding house romance and it involved a meeting of people of different social classes. Brineta O'Byrne is employed as a lady's companion.

== Death and legacy ==
Lindow's Maggie of Margate was republished in 1926 in paperback. She died in 1933 in Hampstead. In 2023 the Oxford Dictionary of National Biography included her, Florence L. Barclay, Mrs. Disney Leith and Bessie Marchant in new biographies of eleven Victorian writers who have caught the attention of academics.
