= The Rosary (novel) =

1909 novel by Florence L. Barclay

- First edition front
- Author: Florence L. Barclay
- Language: English
- Genre: Novel
- Publisher: G.P. Putnam's Sons
- Publication date: 1909
- Publication place: United Kingdom
- Media type: Print (hardback & paperback)
- Pages: 390 pp
- ISBN: 0-9711998-7-6 (2002 edition)
- OCLC: 68189571

The Rosary is a novel by Florence L. Barclay. It was first published in 1909 by G.P. Putnam's Sons and was a bestselling novel for many years running, reaching the number one spot in 1910. It was adapted into five films. Two of these films are Le Rosaire, directed by Tony Lekain (France, 1934) and El rosario, directed by Juan José Ortega (Mexico, 1944).

== Plot ==
Jane Champion is a plain, independent, thirty-year-old woman who is shocked when handsome, beauty-loving artist Garth Dalmain asks her to marry him. Convinced that she isn't good-looking enough to keep his attention, she turns him down despite her own feelings. However, when Garth is blinded in a terrible accident, they get a second chance at love.
