= El rosario =

- Directed by: Juan José Ortega
- Based on: Novel by Florence L. Barclay
- Starring: Andrea Palma, Tomás Perrín, Tana Devodier
- Release date: 1944
- Country: Mexico

El rosario is a 1944 Mexican romantic drama film directed by Juan José Ortega. The film is based on a novel by Florence L. Barclay. It stars Andrea Palma, Tomás Perrín, and Tana Devodier.
