= Henry Percy Gordon =

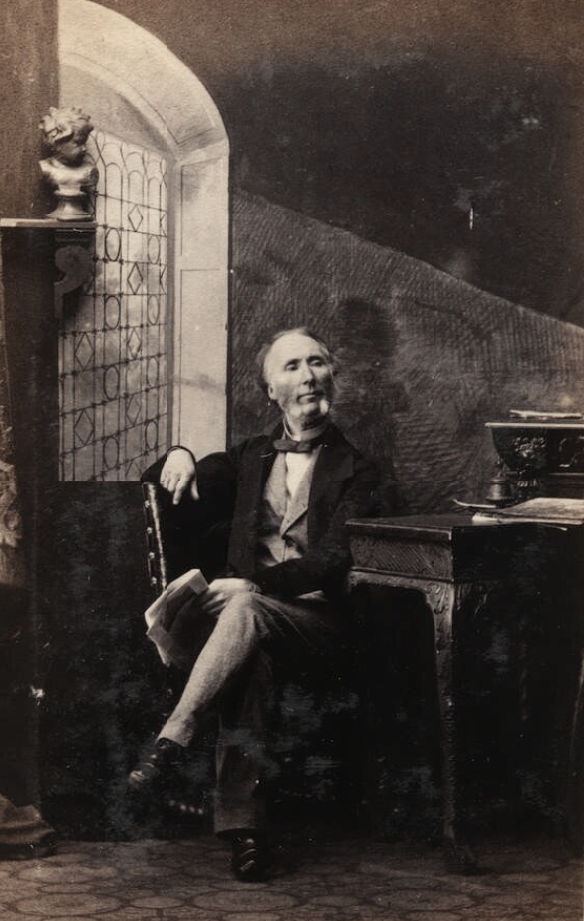
Sir Henry Percy Gordon, 2nd Baronet, 1862 photograph

Sir Henry Percy Gordon, 2nd Baronet, FRS (21 October 1806 – 29 July 1876) was a barrister and artist.

== Life ==
He was the only son of Sir James Willoughby Gordon, 1st Baronet and his wife Isabella Julia Levina Bennet, daughter of Richard Henry Alexander Bennet.

Gordon entered Peterhouse, Cambridge in 1823 and was senior wrangler in 1827, placed ahead of Thomas Turner (1804–1883), Anthony Cleasby, Augustus De Morgan and William Hopkins. He was made 2nd Smith's prizeman, behind Turner, also becoming a Fellow of his college that year. He received an M.A. in 1830. He was admitted to Lincoln's Inn in 1828 and called to the bar in 1831. He became a Fellow of the Royal Society in 1830. He was a Justice of the peace and deputy lieutenant for the Isle of Wight.

In 1851, Gordon succeeded to his father's title. He became also 13th laird of Knockespock. The lairdship was under an entail, and he inherited it on the 1854 death of James Adam Gordon.

Gordon died suddenly, at Blackhall, Kincardineshire, in 1876. At his death, the baronetcy of Gordon of Northcourt became extinct.

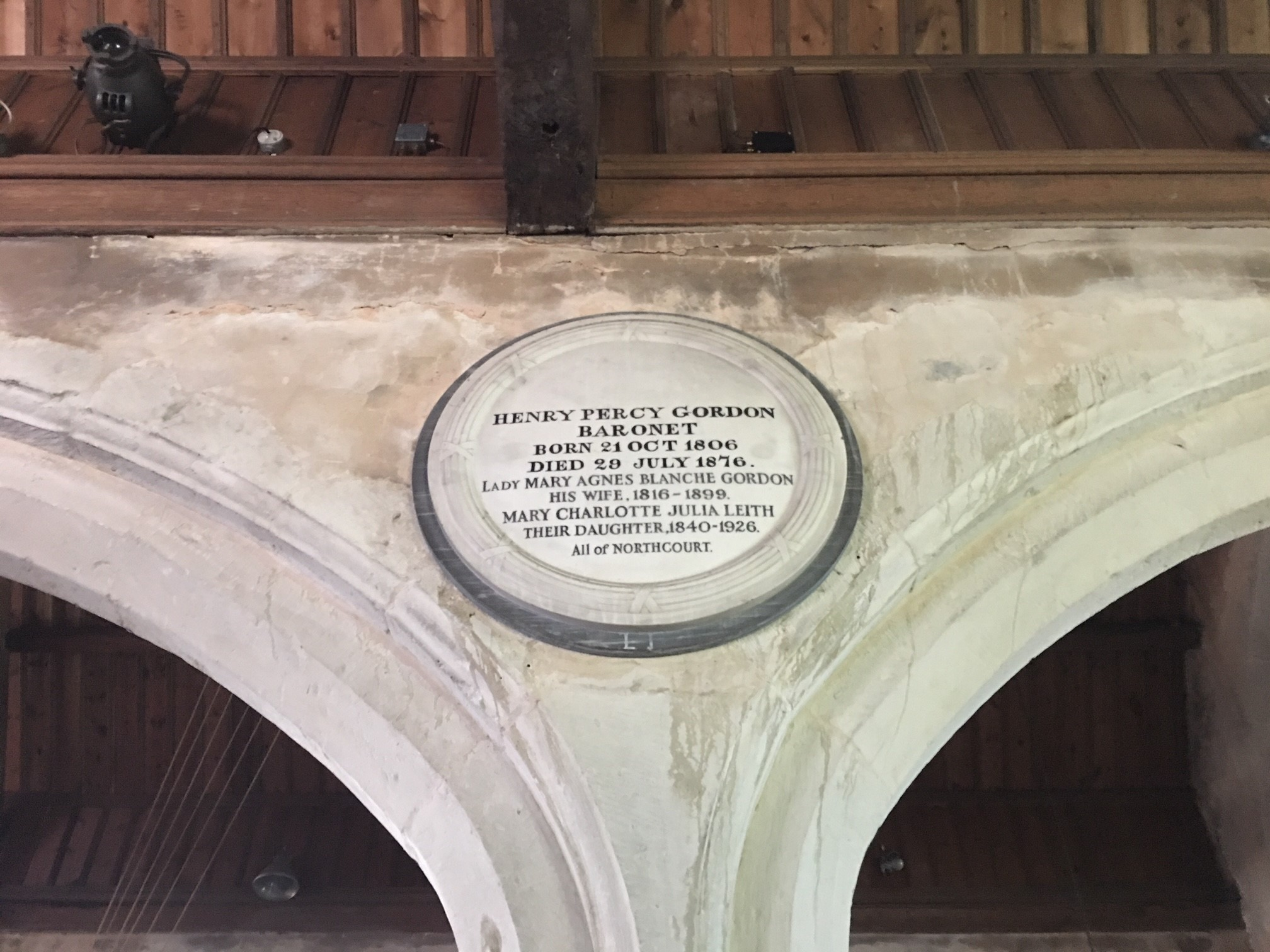
Memorial to Sir Henry Percy Gordon, 2nd Baronet, in St Peter's Church, Shorwell, Isle of Wight

== Family ==
In 1839 Gordon married Lady Mary Agnes Blanche Ashburnham, daughter of George Ashburnham, 3rd Earl of Ashburnham and Charlotte Ashburnham. They had a daughter, Mary Charlotte Julia Gordon (died 1926): she married General Robert William Disney Leith (1819–1892). She was a writer and translator, publishing as Mrs. Disney Leith.

Gordon was an engraver. He produced joint work with his sister, Julia Emily Gordon.

== Notes ==
Baronetage of the United Kingdom
Preceded by James Willoughby Gordon	Baronet (of Northcourt); 1851–1876	Extinct
