= The Mistress of Shenstone (film) =

1921 film by Henry King

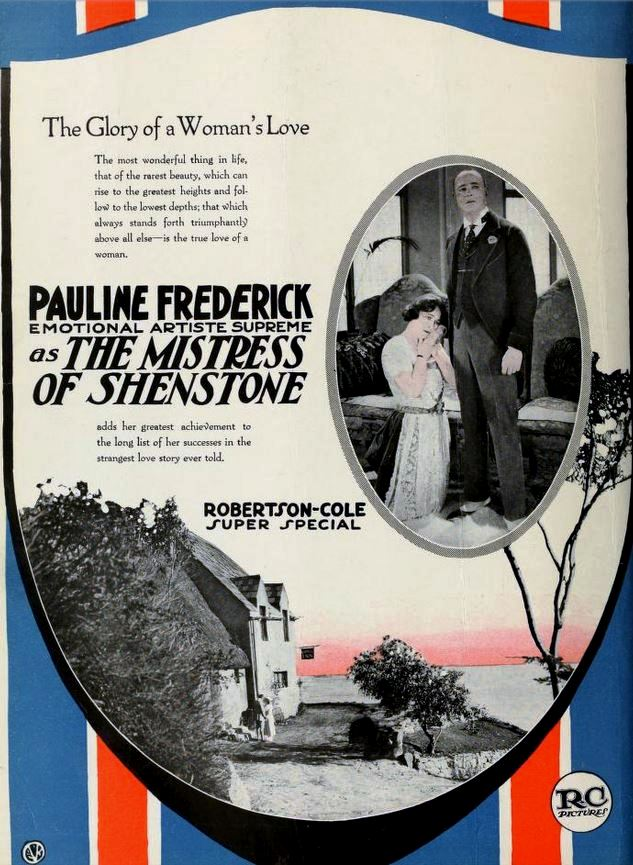
- Advertisement
- Directed by: Henry King
- Based on: The Mistress of Shenstone by Florence L. Barclay
- Produced by: Robertson-Cole Pictures Corporation
- Starring: Pauline Frederick; Roy Stewart
- Cinematography: J. Devereaux Jennings
- Distributed by: Robertson-Cole Distributing Corporation
- Release date: February 27, 1921 (U.S.)
- Running time: 6 reels
- Country: United States
- Languages: Silent (English intertitles); Spanish (Spain version)

The Mistress of Shenstone is a 1921 silent film romance directed by Henry King and starring Pauline Frederick and Roy Stewart based upon the 1910 novel of the same title by Florence L. Barclay.

It is a surviving film but in an abridged version in a Spanish archive, Filmoteca de Catalunya.

== Cast ==
- Pauline Frederick as Lady Myra Ingleby
- Roy Stewart as Jim Airth
- Emmett King as Sir Deryck Brand (credited as Emmett C. King)
- Arthur Clayton as Ronald Ingram
- John Willink as Billy Cathcart
- Helen Wright as Margaret O'Mara
- Rosa Gore as Amelia Murgatroyd
- Helen Muir as Eliza Murgatroyd
- Lydia Yeamans Titus as Susannah Murgatroyd
