= The Young Beggar =

17th c. painting by Bartolomé Esteban Murillo

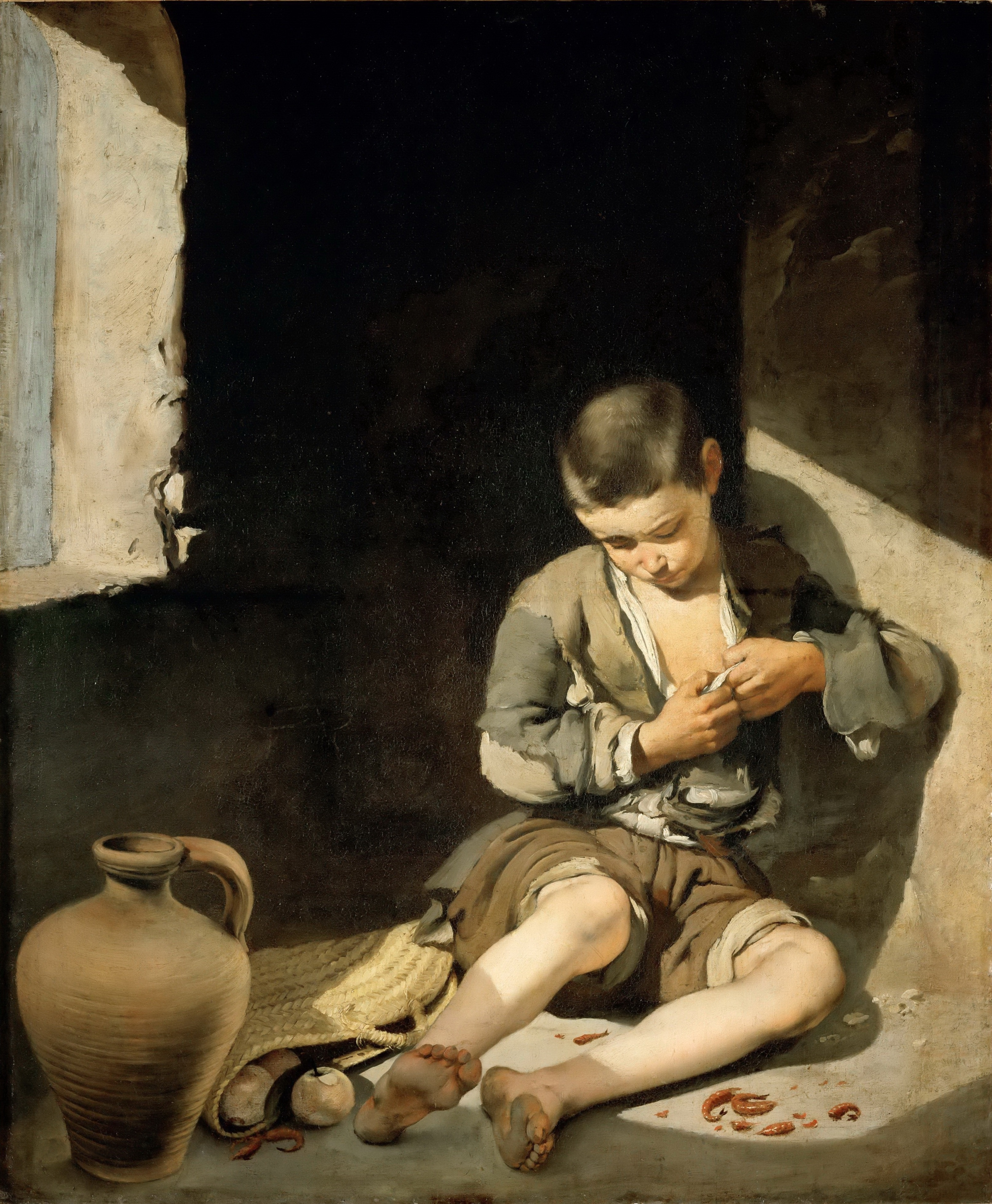
- Artist: Bartolomé Esteban Murillo
- Year: c. 1645-1650
- Medium: oil on canvas
- Dimensions: 134 cm × 300 cm (53 in × 120 in)
- Location: Louvre, Paris

The Young Beggar is an oil on canvas genre painting by Spanish painter Bartolomé Esteban Murillo, from c. 1645-1650. Also known as The Lice-Ridden Boy due to the figure of a young boy delousing himself in the painting, The Young Beggar is the first known depiction of a street urchin by Murillo.

It was influenced by the poverty of Spanish children in the 17th century and followed the style of Michelangelo Merisi da Caravaggio. Murillo's painting focuses on an orphaned child and uses a complementary technique of light and shade. It has been viewed as one of his most popular works of the Spanish Baroque painting and was once kept in the royal collection of Louis XVI.

It is now in the Louvre Museum in Paris.

== History ==
Paintings of children in poverty were greatly appreciated in Flanders due to the long Flemish tradition of low-life genre scenes, including tavern scenes.

As one of the last great painters of Spain's Golden Age, Murillo was above all a religious painter, known for his grand depictions of saints and Christ. His interest in the poor was perhaps related to the doctrine of charity of the Franciscans, for whom he frequently worked. For the Franciscans of Seville, he painted a cycle of pictures to which another painting titled, The Angels' Kitchen belongs.

== Visual analysis ==
=== Subject matter ===
This work of art was undoubtedly inspired by the rampant misery in the streets of Seville during the Golden Age. In the 17th century, Spain had a dilemma with abandoned children who had to fend for themselves. The Young Beggar depicts one of these children who is in the middle of ridding himself of lice.

Murillo was inspired to create a series of genre paintings featuring orphaned children living on the streets of Seville as a result of poor management in seventeenth-century Spain. Not only was there conflict among people because of differences in religion, there were also plagues that affected the children. It was these particular hardships that became the subjects of Murillo's paintings.

Murillo could have been influenced to create such works due to his upbringing and he drew inspiration from what surrounded him. As a child, he was orphaned and raised by relatives. His childhood could have also inspired this series of street children.

Murillo's paintings of poor class citizens and low-life youths were also influenced by the popularity of Spanish picaresque literature of the time as well. Works by novelist Miguel de Cervantès, who was known for depicting stories of roguish heroes and foolish knights, were an enormous inspiration for Murillo.

=== Style ===
The Young Beggar is unlike Murillo's earlier works, which followed the style of his teacher Jorge Castillo and artists like Francisco de Zurbarán and Alonso Cano. Instead, it uses stark contrasts of light and shade, much like the style of Italian painter, Caravaggio.

It shows the exquisite style of Murillo, who used skilled brushworks as well as chiaroscuro, giving an intimate detail to his subject. This style influenced future artists like Sir Joshua Reynolds, John Constable, and Édouard Manet.

=== Composition ===
Murillo uses a complementary contrast between light and shade, also known as tenebrism, as seen with the windowsill on the top left of the painting. The boy sits on the opposite corner at the bottom right, clearing his body from lice. His clothes are torn and seem to have been resown using materials from other rags. By the boy's left knee is a pile of half eaten shrimp, and by his right leg on the left side of the painting is a basket of apples.

== Interpretations ==
Based on the scraps of shrimp and basket of apples on the floor, it can be interpreted that this boy is resting after having eaten.

The act of delousing oneself can be seen as a way of being in control of one's own mind and body, a hygienic act often done by mothers in Dutch genre paintings.

What makes The Young Beggar emotionally appealing is how the boy is unaffected by his poor circumstance. The boy has been compared to a horse named Rocinante from the picaresque novel, Don Quixote by Miguel de Cervantès, who had an odd personality and took on overbearing tasks. Rocinante was seen as a low-quality horse who was infested with pests like the boy.

== Reception ==
Unlike Murillo's religious works, The Young Beggar was not immediately praised as a high work of art. Murillo was criticized for being too focused on creating an idealized urchin, which did not truly reflect the harsh realities of Spanish poverty in Seville.

This painting was also criticized for using glaring lights and poses that were often too dramatic or theatrical. However, this criticism was later disputed as subsequent interpretations viewed this as a virtue of the work; because the young boy in the painting was not affected by his poor condition, it was what made him appealing.

Yet Murillo's works suffered when other artists attempted to create poor copies of the same subject; however what affected his reputation most was due to the artist himself never signing many of his artworks.

It was not until the Rococo period when The Young Beggar and similar themed paintings of street children became more valued. Outside of Spain, Murillo's skill in representing children on the streets was praised. Recorded around 1658, this painting was on display in Gray's Inn, London, proving how the original was moved outside of Seville as early as the 1650s. Similar paintings like Boys Eating Grapes and Melon, originally named Two Spanish Boys Eating Grapes, was another such painting that secured Murillo's popularity beyond his Spanish home.

== Collecting ==
Murillo's paintings of street urchins and begging children became popular towards the end of the Baroque period and were sold to private collectors in the cities of Antwerp, Rotterdam, and London. They were mostly bought by merchants and collectors who wanted the works for their own private displays.

The Young Beggar was among Murillo's most popular pieces and was bought by a dealer named Lebrun, which was then given to Louis XVI for his royal collection. This was a rare accomplishment since Murillo was only one of three Spanish painters who had their works put in the collection, the other two being Diego Velázquez and Francisco Collantes.

== Related paintings ==
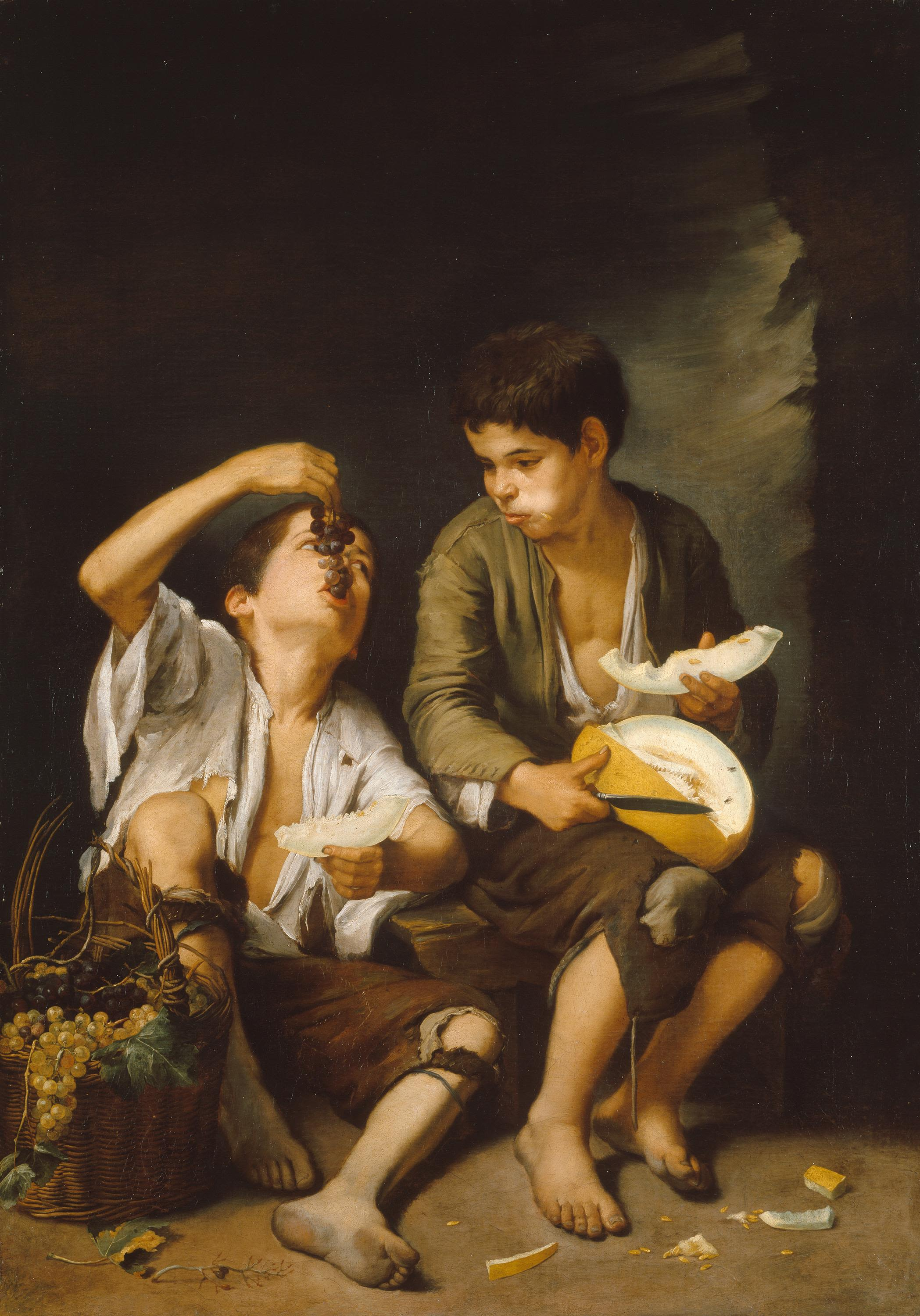
Boys Eating Grapes and Melon, c. 1645–46, Alte Pinakothek

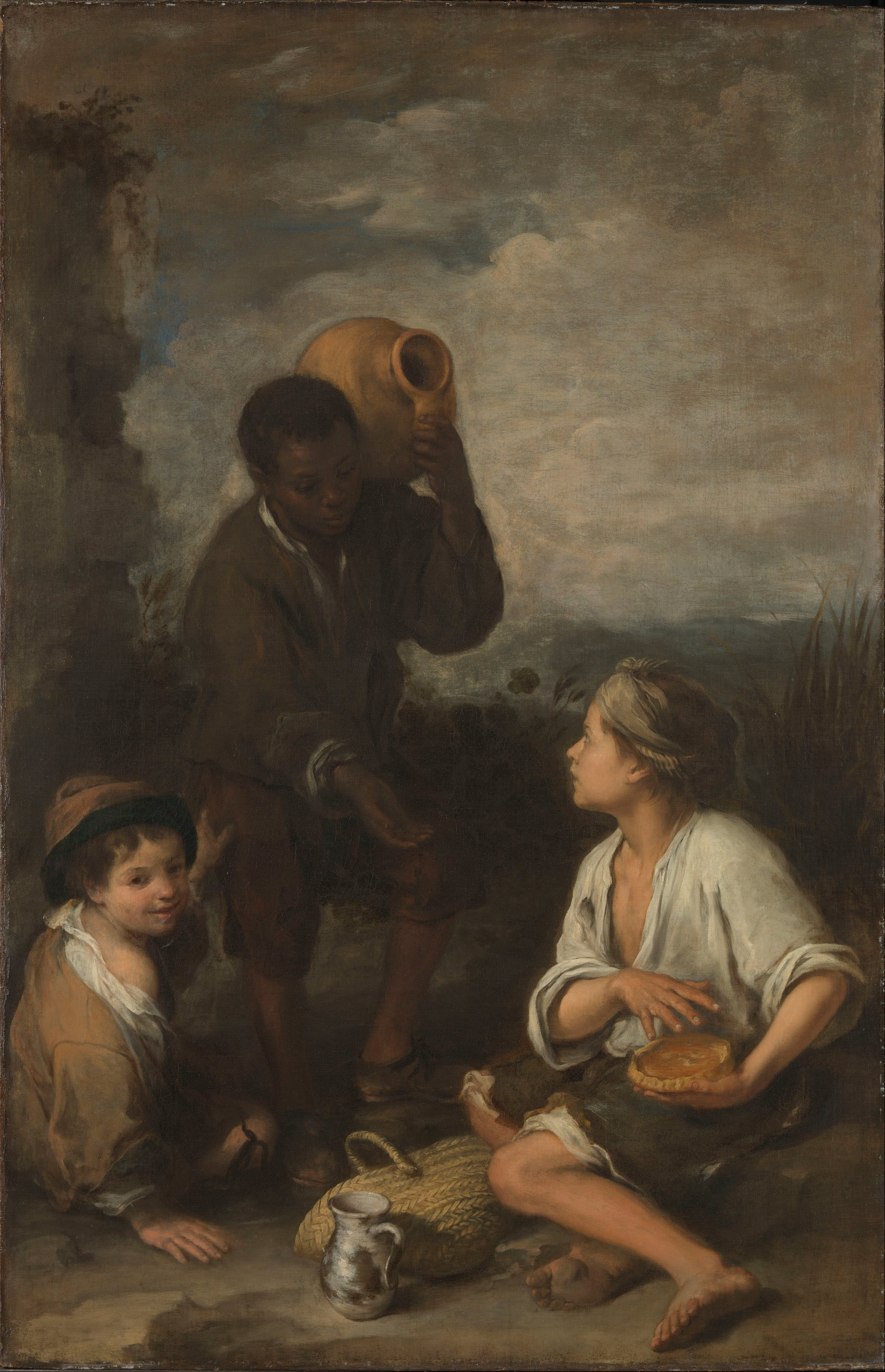
Three Boys, c. 1660
