= James Willoughby Gordon =

British military officer (1772–1851)

General Sir James Willoughby Gordon GCB Bt GCH
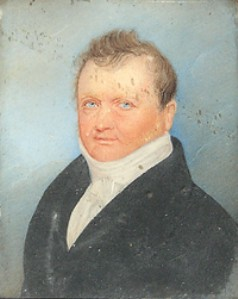
- Born: 21 October 1772
- Died: 4 January 1851 (aged 78)
- Military career
- Allegiance: United Kingdom
- Branch: British Army
- Rank: General
- Commands: Quartermaster-General to the Forces
- Conflicts: Peninsular War
- Awards: Knight Grand Cross of the Order of the Bath; Knight Grand Cross of the Royal Guelphic Order

General Sir James Willoughby Gordon, 1st Baronet, GCB, GCH (21 October 1772 – 4 January 1851) was a general officer in the British Army. He notably served as most long-standing Quartermaster-General to the Forces, holding the position for some 40 years.

== Early life ==
He was the eldest son of Captain Francis Grant-Gordon RN and Mary, daughter of Sir Willoughby Aston, 5th Baronet of Risley, Derbyshire. His younger brothers were Admiral Charles Gordon and Rear-Admiral Henry Gordon, who was twice mayor of Bath.

== Military career ==
Gordon was commissioned into the 66th Regiment of Foot in 1783.

He was appointed Assistant Adjutant General in Ireland in 1795 and in 1801 under Colonel William Henry Clinton commanded the 85th Regiment of Foot in Madeira following its capture. Later the same year he became Deputy Adjutant-General in the West Indies. After serving as Aide de Camp and Military Secretary to the Duke of Kent, he returned to England in 1803 to become Assistant Quartermaster-General. He was made Military Secretary to Prince Frederick, Duke of York and Albany, the Commander-in-Chief of the Forces in 1804, during which period he gave what Thomas Creevey regarded as "pompous, impudent evidence" to the House of Commons enquiry into the Mary Anne Clarke Affair. He was subsequently Commissary-in-Chief to the Forces from 1809. He was made Lieutenant General in 1825.

He was Quartermaster-General to the Forces from 1811 to 1851. During this time, he was one of the many present for the Robert Adams' narration of his adventures as a Barbary slave in North Africa. Despite the veracity of this narration being questioned by many during this time, Gordon publicly proclaimed his faith in the truth of Adams' story, announcing that "if he proved an imposter, he will be the second only to Psalmanazar." Gordon's support of Adams was very significant, due to the controversial nature of The Narrative of Robert Adams.

He was given the colonelcy of the 85th (Bucks Volunteers) Regiment of Foot (Light Infantry) from 1815 to 1823 and of the 23rd Regiment of Foot (Royal Welsh Fusiliers) from 1823. He was promoted full general on 23 November 1841.

Gordon died at his residence in the Royal Hospital Chelsea in 1851 from a severe attack of bronchitis. His body was subsequently taken by railway and buried in the family vault at Knighton on the Isle of Wight.

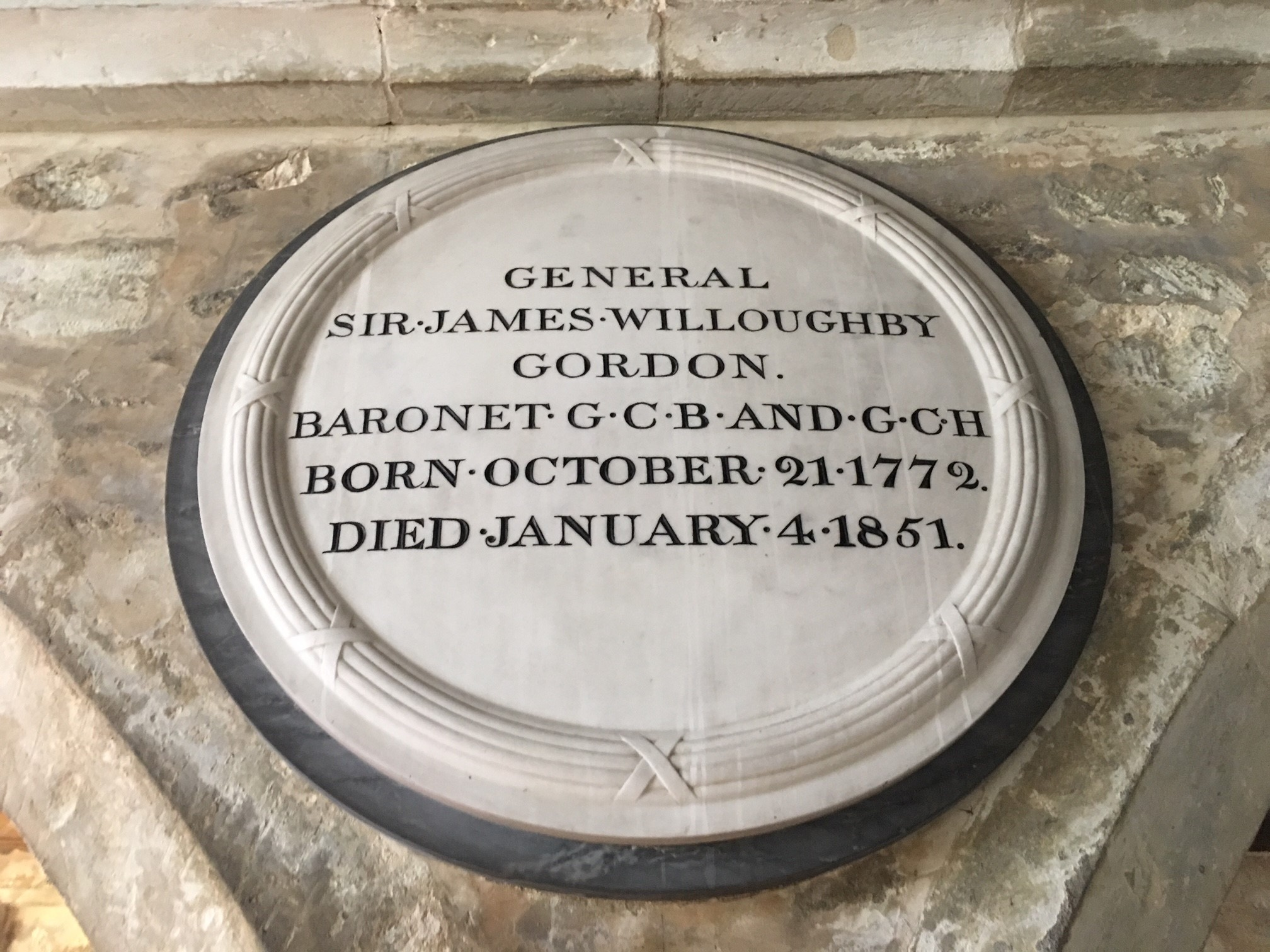
James Willoughby Gordon memorial in St Peter's Church, Shorwell, Isle of Wight

== Honours ==
He was elected a Fellow of the Royal Society in 1801. He was made Baronet Gordon of Northcourt in the Isle of Wight in 1818 and awarded Knight Grand Cross of the Royal Guelphic Order (GCH) in 1825 and Knight Grand Cross of the Order of the Bath (GCB) in 1831.

He was also Member of Parliament for Launceston from 1830 to 1831.

== Family ==
On 15 October 1805, Gordon married Julia Lavinia, daughter of Richard Henry Alexander Bennet of Northcourt Manor, Shorwell, Isle of Wight. Their only son was Henry who became the second and last baronet. A daughter, Julia Emily (13 October 1810 – 1896), was known as an artist, as her mother was.

== Works ==
- Military Transactions of the British Empire: From the Commencement of the Year 1803, to the Termination of the Year 1807. Luke Hanfard & sons, near Lincoln's-inn fields. 1808.

Military offices
Preceded by Sir William Clinton	Military Secretary; 1804–1809	Succeeded by Sir Henry Torrens
Preceded by Sir Robert Brownrigg	Quartermaster-General to the Forces; 1811–1851	Succeeded by Sir James Freeth
Parliament of the United Kingdom
Preceded by Pownoll Pellew	Member of Parliament for Launceston; 1830–1831; With: James Brogden	Succeeded by John Malcolm
Baronetage of the United Kingdom
New creation	Baronet (of Northcourt); 1818–1851	Succeeded by Henry Percy Gordon
