= William Frederick Witherington =

English painter

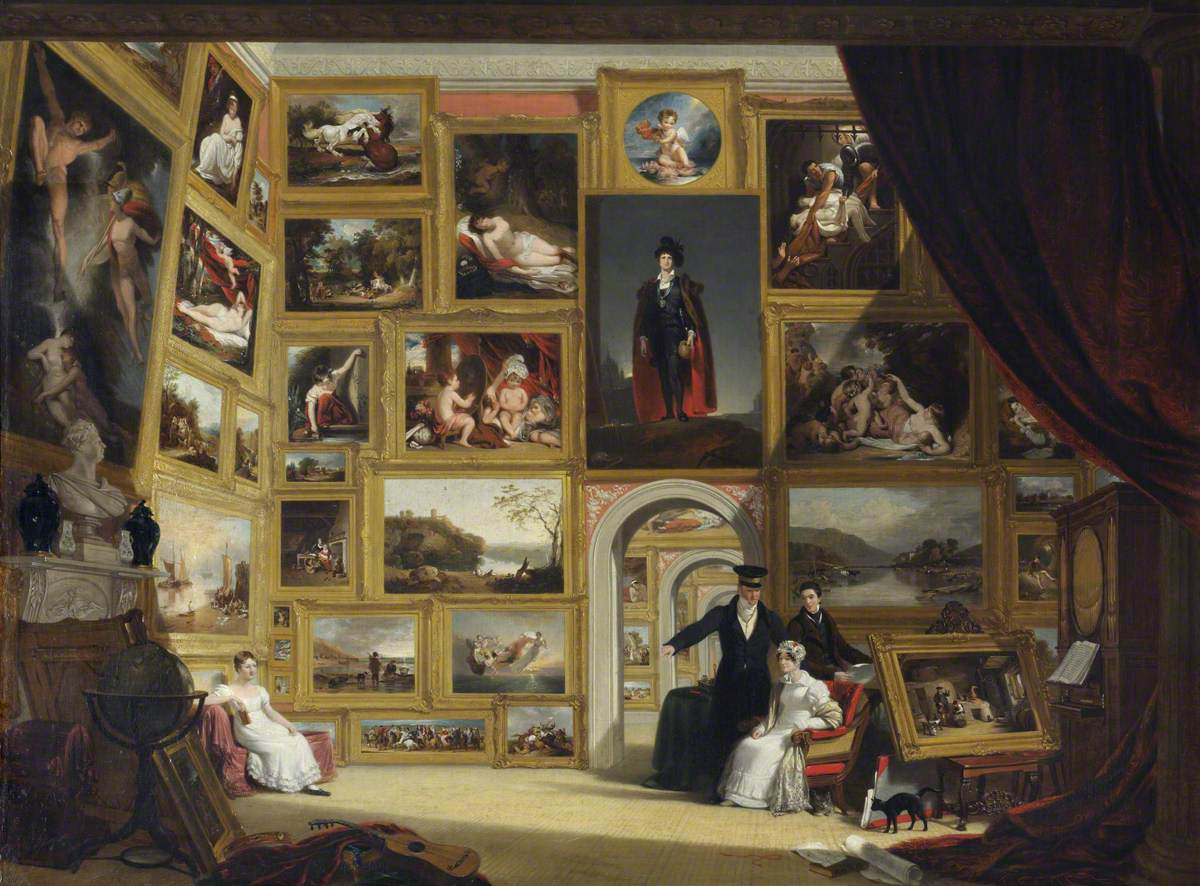
A Modern Picture Gallery, 1824.

William Frederick Witherington RA (26 May 1785 – 10 April 1865) was an English painter and academic. Born in London, he entered the Royal Academy Schools in 1805. Except for one year, he exhibited annually at the Royal Academy from 1811 until his death. He was elected A.R.A. on 1 November 1830 and R.A. on 10 February 1840. He retired as an academician on 28 May 1863.

His early works were mostly landscapes, but the influence of artists like George Morland (1763–1804) can be seen in the importance he gave to the figurative element in his paintings.

Witherington enjoyed painting English scenery and never travelled abroad. As with many of his works, he does not depict the harsh realities of rural life, but instead records incidents of family life. Like his contemporary, Augustus Wall Callcott, RA, he creates a composition with a lively foreground of figures and animals, combined with a landscape with distant vistas glimpsed through the wood.

He died on 19 April, aged 79, and was buried on the eastern side of Highgate Cemetery. His grave (plot no.13865) no longer has a headstone or any marker.

== Gallery ==
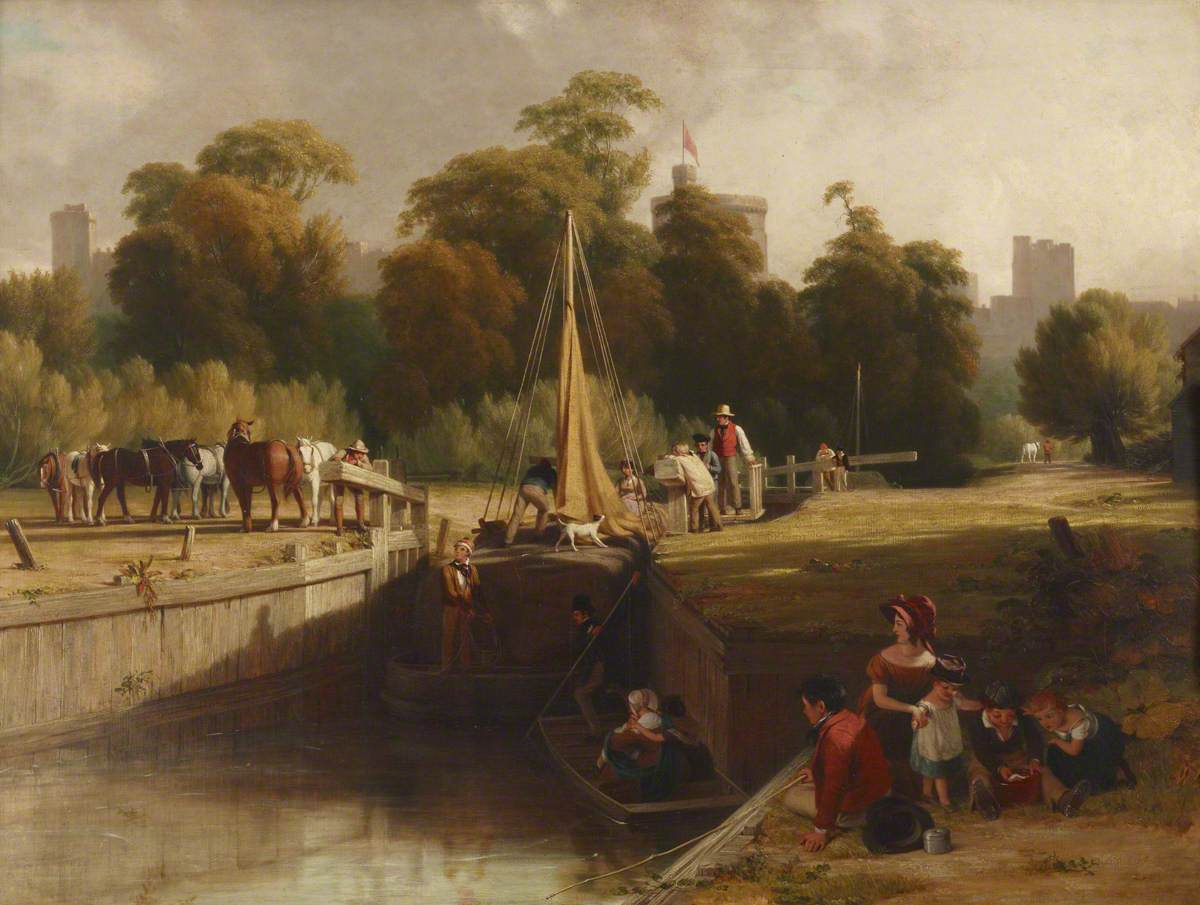
The Old Lock, Windsor, 1817

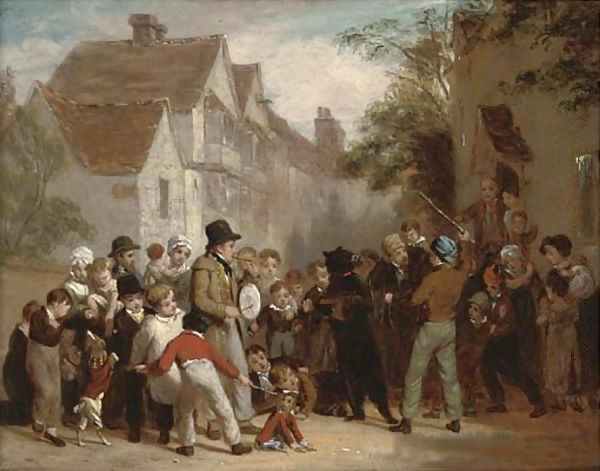
The Dancing Bear, 1822

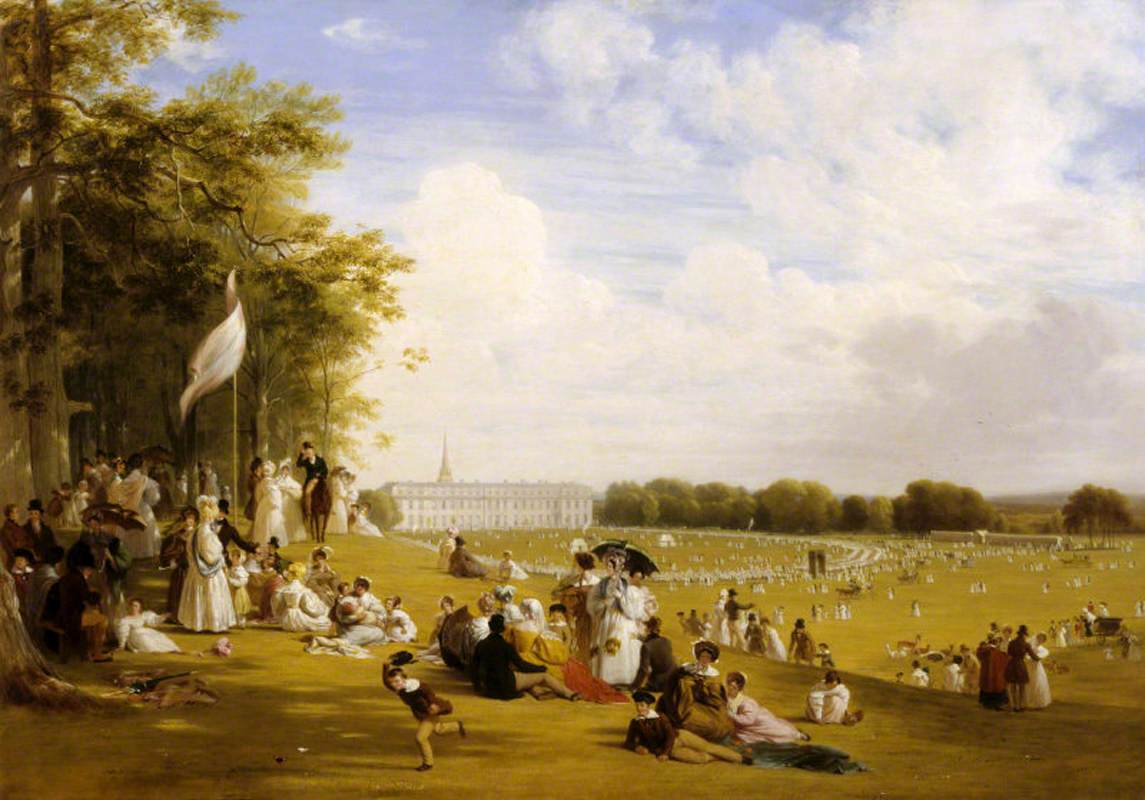
Fête in Petworth Park, 1836

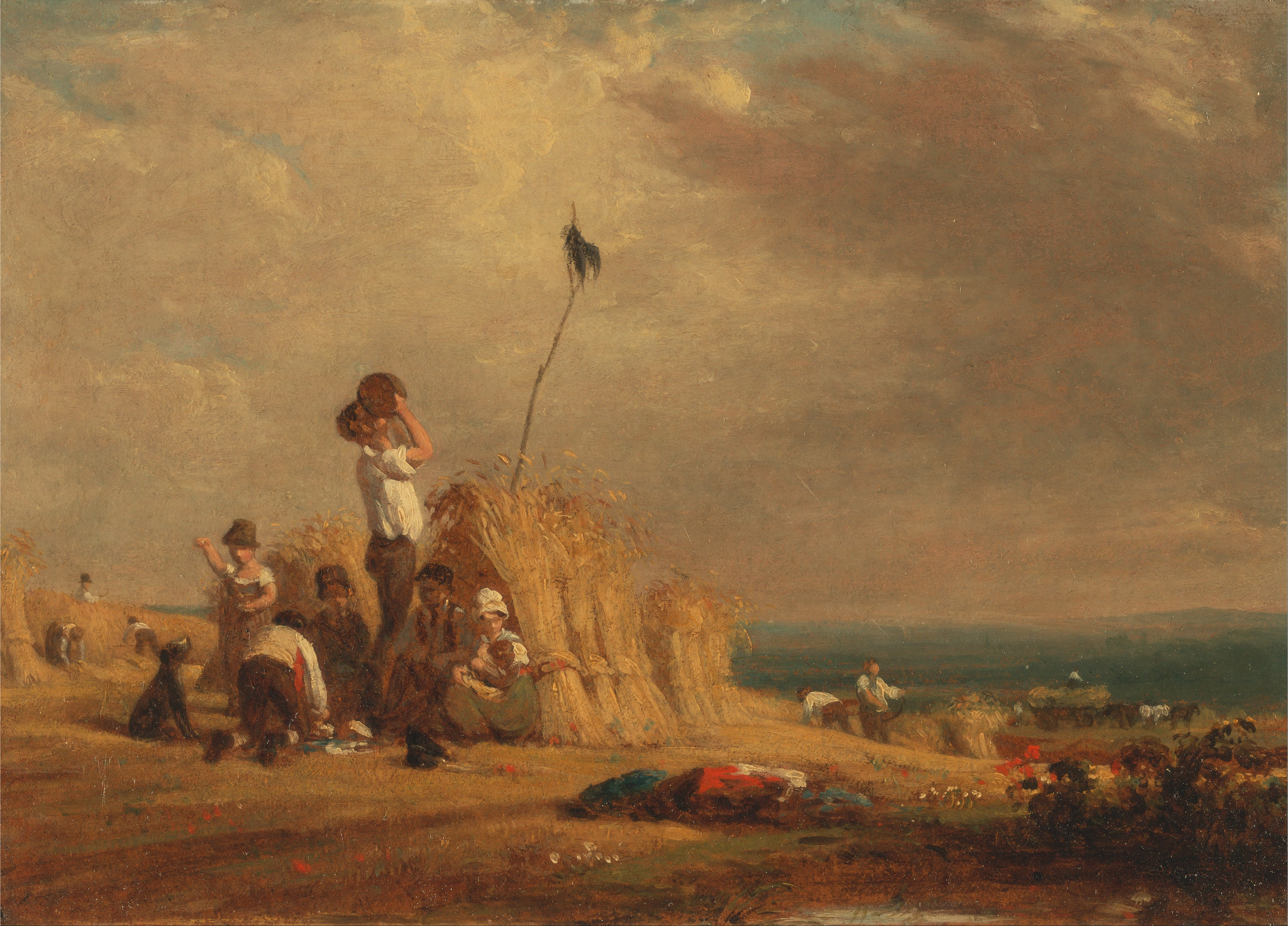
Mid-Day Rest, Harvest, 1840

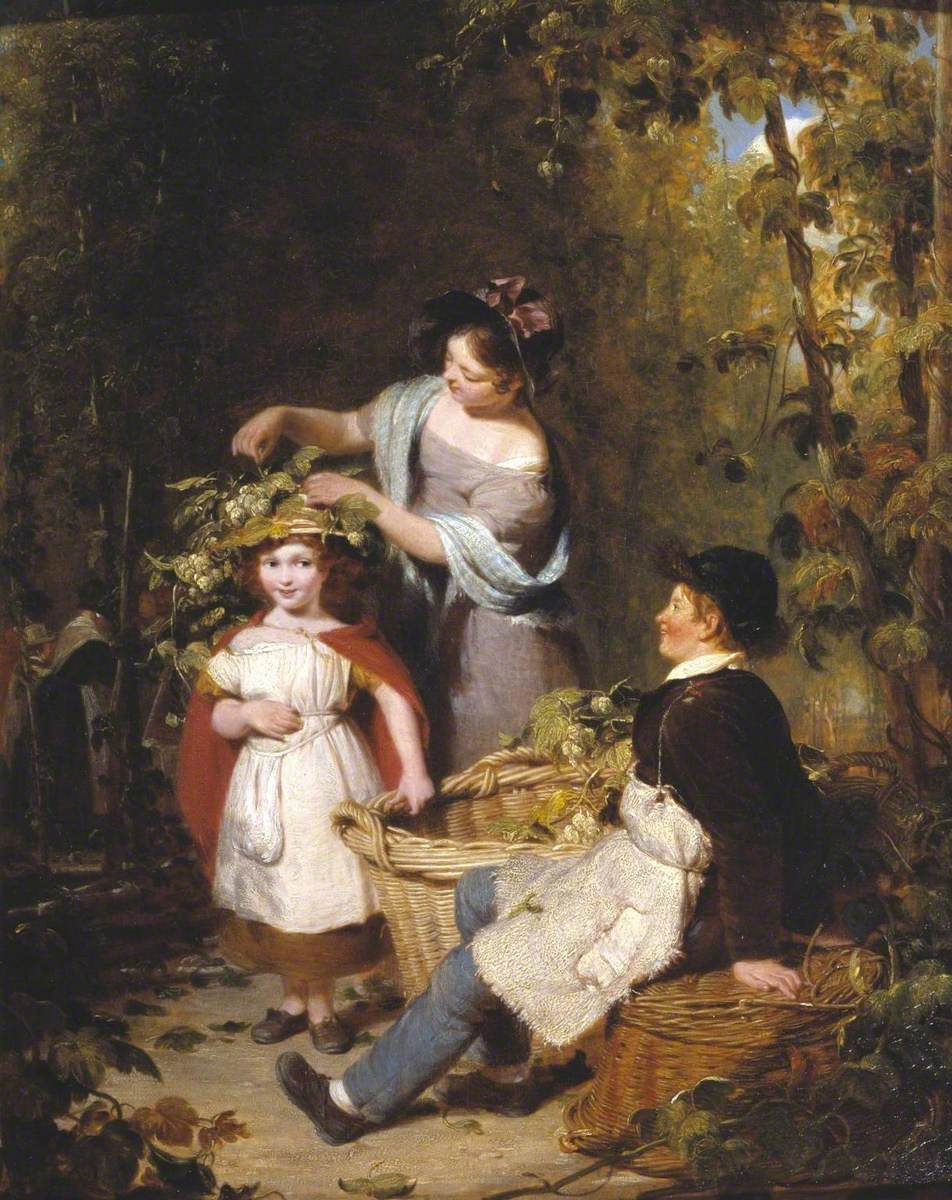
The Hop Garland, 1843

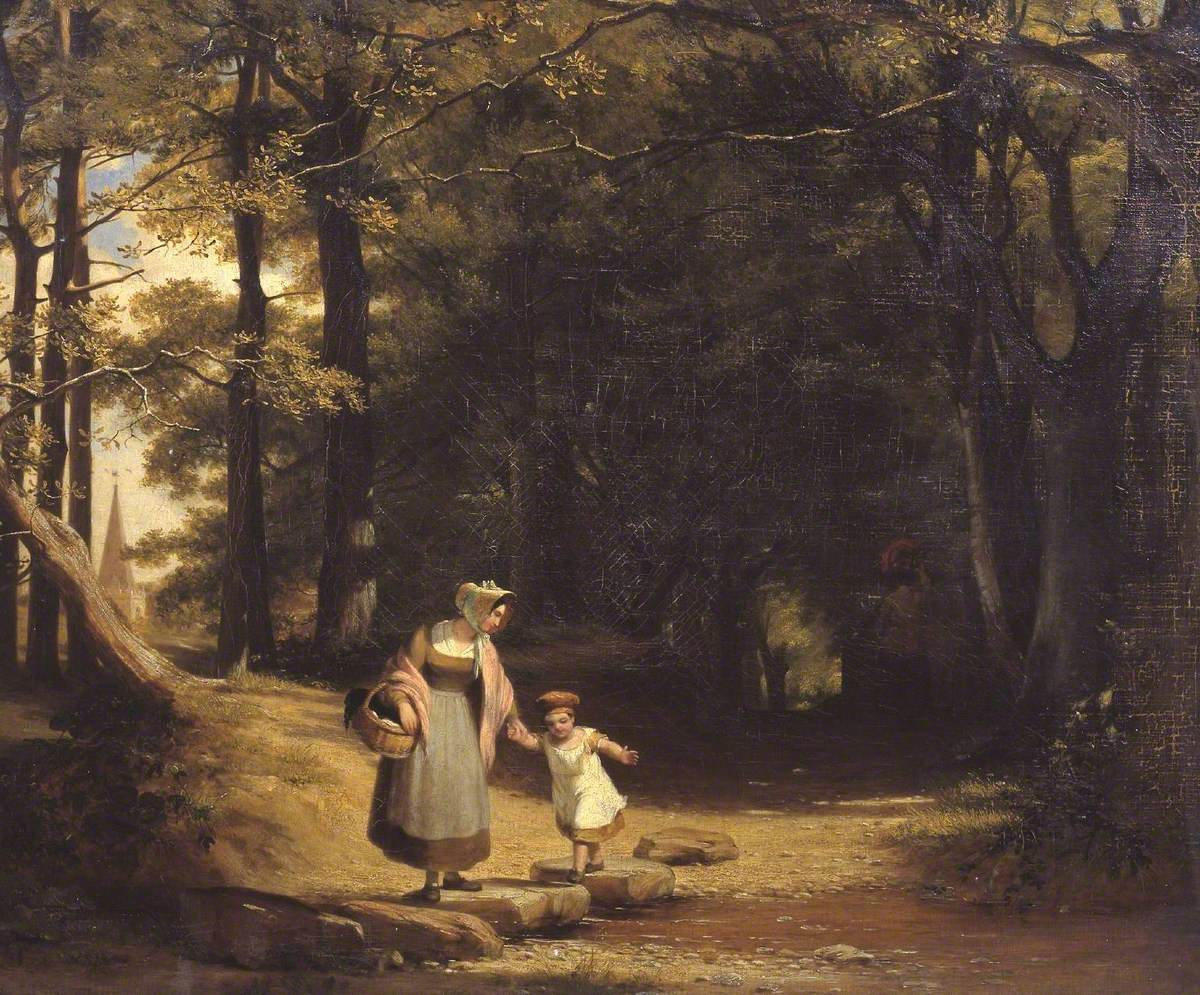
Stepping Stones on the Machno, North Wales, 1844
