= Bessie Marchant =

English writer (1862–1941)

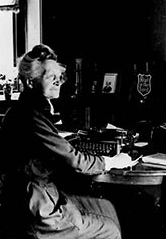
- Born: 12 December 1862; Petham, UK
- Died: 10 November 1941 (aged 78)
- Writing career
- Pen name: Mrs J.A. Comfort; John Comfort
- Genre: adventure novel

Bessie Marchant (1862–1941) was a prolific English writer of adventure novels featuring young female heroines. She published most of her work under the name Bessie Marchant, but occasionally published as Bessie Marchant Comfort or Mrs J.A. Comfort. And a few books for boys, published under the name John Comfort are attributed to her.

== Life ==
Marchant was born at Debden Court Farm, Petham. She was married at age 27 to Jabez Ambrose Comfort, a Baptist minister 28 years her senior. Her daughter Constance was born in 1891 in Hitchin where her husband had a school.

Despite never leaving England herself, she wrote close to 150 novels set in locations around the world. Her earliest novels, such as Broken Barriers and Under Clear Skies were simple romances set in an evangelical Christian context, usually Primitive Methodism, and located in England. Some of her novels were serialized in illustrated magazines such as Sunday Reading for the Young, and some were published in combination books such as The Bessie Marchant Omnibus Book, which contains three novels: The Gold-Marked Charm, Sally Makes Good, and Three Girls in Mexico. She later wrote many novels in the style of the Victorian adventure novel (even being called "the girls' Henty", a reference to G.A. Henty, the author of popular adventure stories for boys), but she challenged established gender roles by putting strong female characters in what was seen as a boys' genre.

The typical Bessie Marchant heroine may be reluctant, unsure of herself, homesick, and frightened, but she puts aside her feelings in an effort to do her duty and do the right thing. An example is a passage from The Adventures of Phyllis, where a young woman finds herself alone, looking after a delirious injured man.

Besides, it was selfish to think of her own discomfort or possible danger when his condition was plainly so much worse than her own. All the latent heroism in her nature was rising now to meet the demand upon it. She would not let herself speculate on what her home people would say if they could see her now; she would not even think of what might befall her before she could extricate herself from this strange situation, but content herself with living just for the present hour, and doing her best to meet each need as it should arise.

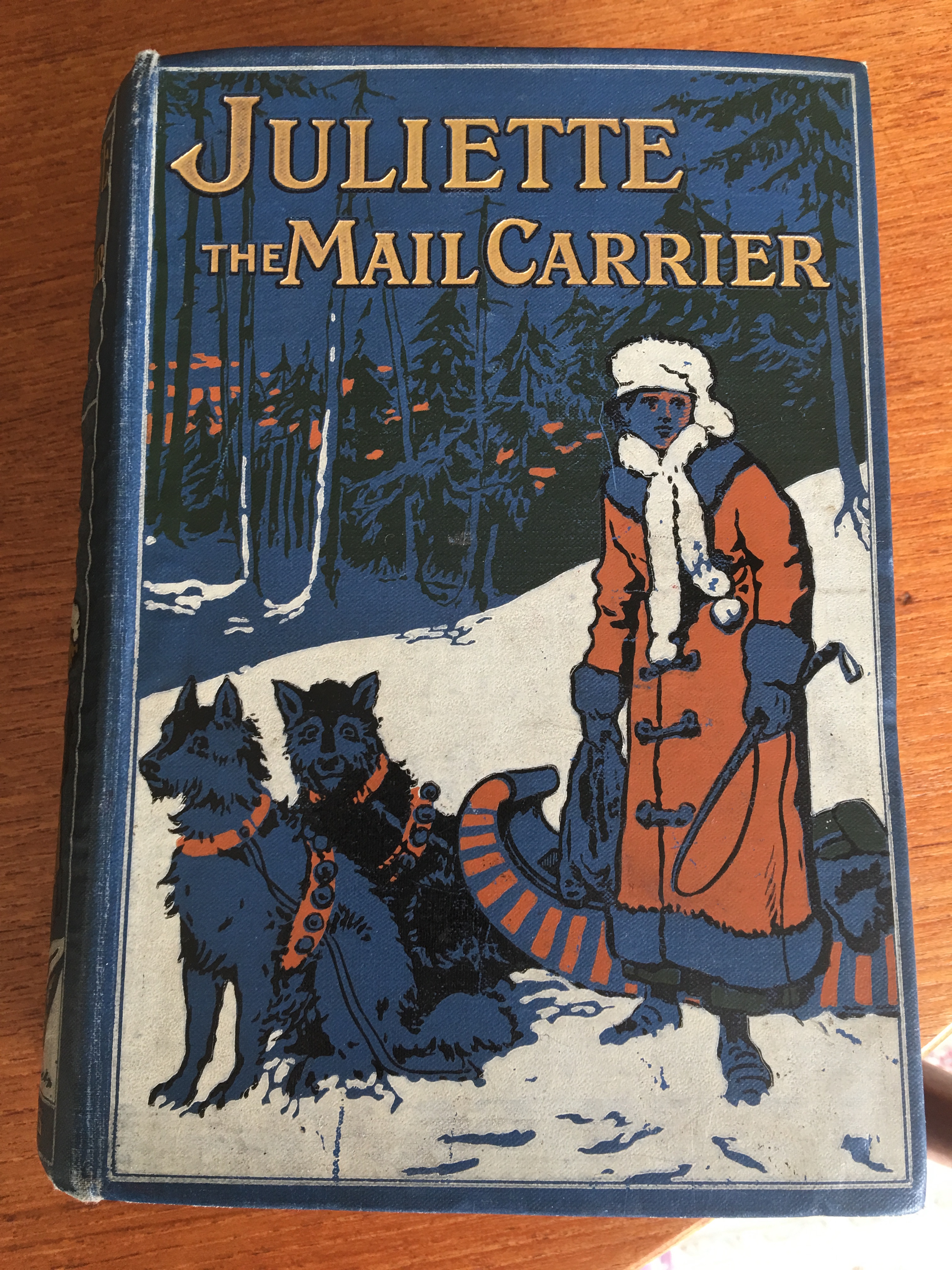
Juliette the Mail Carrier, as published by Collins Clear Type Press.

Early publications of Bessie Marchant novels typically have no dust jacket, but have an illustrative image printed directly on the cover and spine. This is especially true of those published by Blackie and by Collins.

Marchant died in 1941. In 2023 the Oxford Dictionary of National Biography included her in a group of new biographies of eleven Victorian and Edwardian writers who have caught the attention of academics.

== Novels ==
Listed here are some of the novels written by Bessie Marchant. Where these books are available in formats other than print, this is noted in the Available Formats column. The Publication Date is rarely included in the printed copies of Marchant's works; apparently this was common practice in books printed in the early 20th century. Where a publication date is shown, it was discovered through on-line references, such as entries in goodreads.com, so it cannot be guaranteed to be correct. However, because Bessie Marchant books were popular choices for prize-giving or birthday and Christmas presents, an inscription is often found with a date. This date is listed as the 'presentation date', and can be understood to indicate that the book was published prior to that date. Publication Date has been added based on the work of the website www.authorandbookinfo.com. The plot summaries shown below are based on reading the book referenced.

Title	Available Formats	Publication Date	Presentation Date	Location	Plot Summary
Adventures of Phyllis, The - A Story of the Argentine		1910	1913	ARGENTINA	When Phyllis's father loses all his money in speculation, the family disperses, and only Phyllis is left with no place to go. She answers an ad for a nursery governess in a remote country town, and when she arrives to take the job, she finds things much different from her expectations.
Adventurous Seven, The: Their Hazardous Undertaking	gutenberg.org Kindle; Nook	1914?, 1918		AUSTRALIA	Seven children travel to Australia to find their father & prove him innocent of malpractice.
Among the Hostile Hordes. a story of the Tai-Ping rebellion		1890		CHINA	John Armstrong and his son Don become caught up in the Tai-ping rebellion during their stay in China.
Among the Torches of the Andes (title as published by W P Nimmo & Co of Edinburgh)					See entry for "On the Track; or, Among The Torches Of The Andes"
Anna of the Tenterford		1935		CANADA, British Columbia	Anna Brown must maintain a remote farm in British Columbia now that her stepfather and his son have died. She lives alone with her difficult mother, until her mother's young nephews, Rollo and Rich come to live with them.
Apple Lady, The		1908	1918	AUSTRALIA, Tasmania	Hetty St John is singlehandedly running an apple business in Tasmania while her brother Dennis is suffering from temporary blindness. While delivering apples for shipment, Hetty sees young Silver Blair being beaten by her uncle. Hetty intervenes, and Silver comes to live with Hetty and Dennis. It takes many years, but finally, the complicated tale of inheritance and mistaken identity is straightened out.
Athabasca Bill: A Tale of the Far West	Nook	1899, 1906?	1920	CANADA, Alberta	In Alberta, Canada, young Fred's family awaits the return of their father who is looking for a site for a new home for them. But just as he return, bloodhounds seeking the thief who stole a box containing hundreds of dollars trace the scent to Fred's father. Fred sets out to find Athabasca Bill who may have information that will prove that his father is innocent.
Bannister Twins, The		1929	1933	CANADA, Prince Edward Island	Dorkie (Dorcas) and Dob (Dobson) are twins who live on Prince Edward Island with their mother and fisherman stepfather. Their stepfather and two stepbrothers disappear in a storm and Dorkie and Dob rescue a castaway who has lost her memory.
Bertrams Of Ladywell, The		1902		ENGLAND, Leicestershire	The Bertrams have lost most of their money and are living with the mother's unmarried sister in the small town of Ladywell. The four children, Elizabeth, Sara, Ruth & Powys decide to do good works, but they have many mishaps before they finally manage do something that is really helpful.
Bid for Safety, A		1924	1924	MEXICO	Orphaned Bride travels to Mexico, intending to live with her aunt and uncle. But when she arrives, she discovers that their plantation has been destroyed and they have disappeared.
Black Cockatoo, The: A Story of Western Australia.		1910		AUSTRALIA	Mrs Paynter is a kindly woman who agrees to look after the baby of a man who may be part of a gang of cattle-duffers who have been stealing local cattle. The six Paynter children plus this baby are left on their own when their mother has to travel to look after their injured father in the town several days ride distant. The family suffers from worries and troubles, but many people help the family because of Mrs. Paynter's goodness.
Bonded Three, The		1899	1901	INDIA	Triplets Robert, Rosamund, and Ailsa Craig get caught up in a native uprising in India.
Brave Little Cousin, A		1902	1938	AUSTRALIA, Queensland	An orphaned girl from New Zealand returns to her father's home in Queensland where she discovers that her father had been cheated out of the profits from a gold mine.
Broken Barriers		1889	1903	ENGLAND, Kent	Ruth Maplesden lives in Yorkendam, Kent and helps her father establish a new Methodist church.
By Honour Bound: A School Story for Girls	Kindle	1925		ENGLAND ?	A girl sees a fellow student in her new school shoplifting, then has problems with her during the school term.
Canadian Farm Mystery, A or Pam the Pioneer	gutenberg.org Kindle; Nook	1917		CANADA	Pam goes to Canada to live with her estranged grandfather, but finds that he is missing and suspected of a crime.
Captives Of The Kaid, The		1904	1904	AFRICA	Lalla and her mother travel on her uncle's yacht along the coast of Africa. They have adventures which lead to the reunion of estranged family members.
Caspar's Find, or The Whale Island		1905	1913	TRINIDAD	Pampered young Alda is shipwrecked and lands on a remote island near Trinidad where 12 year old Caspar lives with his whale-hunting uncle.
Chupsie; the Story of a Baby		1904		INDIA	Mopsie and Popsie Stewart live with their mother and father in India. They find a baby in their garden, and have many adventures trying to return it to its parents.
Cicely Frome, the Captain's Daughter	Nook	1900	192x	CEYLON	A captain's daughter seeks her missing father in Ceylon.
Countess From Canada, A: A Story of a Life in the Backwoods	gutenberg.org Kindle; Nook	1911	1932	CANADA, Ontario	After her father is injured, Katherine Radford must try to run her family's store in the Keewatin District located west of Hudson Bay in rural Canada.
Courage of Katrine, The		1934	1948	CANADA, Ontario	Katrine and Wilfred from Quebec are visiting cousins in Sault Ste. Marie. There they enjoy a relaxed farm life and parties and get involved in foiling some cross-border smuggling.
Courageous Girl, A: A Story of Uruguay		1909		URUGUAY	Anne returns home to Uruguay after years at school in England, only to find that father has sold their beautiful home, and has taken a job managing the shepherds on the sheep ranch that used to be theirs.
Cousin Peter's Money		1926			
Cuckoo of the Log Raft		1931		CANADA, British Columbia	Cordelia, nicknamed 'Cuckoo', is a foundling, being raised with the Barnet family in British Columbia. The Barnet's have a pulp & paper mill that is just barely making money and faces stiff competition when a neighboring mill is bought by a go-ahead new owner.
Cynthia Wins - A Tale of the Rocky Mountains		1918		CANADA	Cynthia was orphaned as a young child, and was raised in an institution. When she makes the decision to give up the chance of a good job to help take care of a sick woman who had been kind to her as a child, she embarks on a series of adventures.
Dangerous Mission, A; A Tale Of Russia In Revolution		1918	1940	RUSSIA, Petrograd	Tatna is a young school teacher in Petrograd, Russia. She gets caught up in a bread riot and escapes, disguised as another teacher who is bound for a school in the remote countryside, where she discovers that she has a talent for teaching the local people about responsible government.
Darling(s) of Sandy Point; A Story of adventure around the Straits of Magellan		1907	1923	SOUTH AMERICA, Tierra Del Fuego	George & Willy have come to Sandy Point looking for their father, but he has disappeared and is thought to be dead. They are taken in by Elias Dawe who is already looking after Darling, a girl who was found alone on a raft after a shipwreck.
Daughter of the Desert, A		1937	1935	SUDAN? (an Arabic desert near Ethiopia & Libya), ENGLAND, Kent	Alestra, a kindly young woman who has grown up as the daughter of the chief in a desert tribe, discovers new information about her background.
Daughter of the Ranges, A: A Story of Western Canada;		1906, 1925	1933	CANADA, Alberta	Caryl tries to run her family's ranch in Canada after her father is paralyzed after an accident and she hires Helen and Helen's brother to help her.
Daughters of the Dominion: A Story of the Canadian Frontier	gutenberg.org Kindle	1909		CANADA	Nell, an orphan, is raised by her cruel, miserly grandfather, and when he sells their house and disappears, she travels to Canada to make a life for herself.
Deborah's Find		1933		NEW ZEALAND	Deborah and her family have lived for many years at Haumoe, a farm in New Zealand. The farm is owned by n elderly a man they call Daddy MacNeal, who took them in when they first arrive. They have always expected that Daddy MacNeal would leave the farm to them, but he dies without a will.
Debt of the Damerals, The		1905			
Delmayne's Adventures, or Lost on the Saguenay (as published by Collins' Clear-Type Press of London and Glasgow,)		1903	1911	CANADA, Quebec	Gregory Gigot Delmayne, or Giggles, is the son of Col Delmayne, a high official in Quebec. A strange women he meets on the train gives him a letter for his father that warns of a plot to assassinate the Governor-General. Giggles, with the help of his dog Squirms, has many adventures during his attempt to alert his father and foil this plot.
Denver(s) Wilson's Double: A Story of New Mexico		1915		USA, New Mexico	Garda goes to her uncle's ranch in New Mexico to celebrate her cousin's wedding. She expects to return to her mother in Los Angeles after the wedding, but her mother must make an unexpected trip to England, and so Garda stays on at the ranch. While there, Garda helps unravel a mystery that causes her uncle to be unjustly accused of a crime.
Deputy Boss, The; A Tale of British Honduras		1910	1913	BRITISH HONDURAS	14 year old Greg Outram lives on a timber farm in British Honduras. He is sent to help a neighbor timber farmer who has been injured. Although Greg is young, he takes on the role of Deputy Boss and does well. But there are some people who want him out of the way.
Di, the Dauntless		1926		MOROCCO	Di and her sisters try to support their family's ranch in Western Morocco when there is danger from Arab superstitions and a threat of attack from marauding tribesmen.
Diana Carries On		1924, 1934		ARGENTINA	A girl runs an alpaca ranch in Argentina, fighting wild cats, while her father is missing.
Erica's Ranch				COLUMBIA	Erica is the manager for her half-sister Hannah's ranch in Columbia. Hannah makes a will leaving the ranch to a young girl she has taken in, and then Hannah disappears, leaving only Erika to try to find her.
Felicity's Fortune		1936	1952	SINGAPORE	Felicity goes to live with her Uncle Dirk on an island near Singapore, and discovers his shady dealings with antiquities.
Ferry House Girls, The; An Australian Story		1912	1923	AUSTRALIA	Vic and Lu try to cope with the dangerous Bell's Gang.
Fleckie; A Story of the Desert		1902, 1934		UZBEKISTAN, TAJIKISTAN, KAZAKHSTAN	Fleckie Lorne, a 10-year-old English boy, travels through the deserts of present-day Uzbekistan, Tajikistan, and Kazakhstan with his father who is buying and selling jewels. They are captured by robbers, and Fleckie shows ingenuity in helping them escape.
Fortunes of Prue, The		1923	1960	PARAGUAY	Prue's brother Theo is accused of stealing money, so he loses a chance at a job in London, and they accept the offer of work with a distributor of oranges in Paraguay.
From the Scourge of the Tongue		1902		ENGLAND, Dorset ?	After her father's death, Belinda tries to keep her family farm going with only the help of her sisters and a few workmen. But a shameful secret from her past makes it hard for her to keep the respect of the local people.
Fun O' the Fair, The		1901		ENGLAND	Sue Bolton is being looked after by her deceased father's brother, a carnival traveler in England, while her mother remains in India working as a lady's maid. Sue is asked to substitute for a young woman who does a carnival show dancing with snakes - but Sue is frightened of the snakes and runs away to try to find her mother.
Ghost of Rock Range, The		1900	1905	ENGLAND	Molly and Hubert are told by the nurserey maid that there is a ghost haunting their estate, but the ghost may have to do with current conflicts in the family.
Girl and a Caravan, A: The Story of Irma's Quest in Persia		1915		PERSIA (IRAN), RUSSIA	Irma, the adopted daughter of Shereef Ali Khan, a Persian merchant, discovers that his wife, whom she had regarded as her mother, has been kidnapped by Russian police agents. Shereef now explains that his wife Zeeba is not Irma's mother, but a Russian countess, who fled Russia with the child of imprisoned English friends - Irma herself. Irma undertakes the search for Zeeba.
Girl Captives, The: A Story of the Indian Frontier		1900	1900	INDIA	Juliet Boyd and her snobbish nieces Jessie and Gwen and their infant brother Wyn must take refuge with kindly Chrissie Felton when their town is under siege by the Kajid hills people and Major Boyd and Captain Felton are away fighting.
Girl Munition Worker, A: The Story of a Girl's Work during the Great War		1916		ENGLAND	Deborah suspects a man in her town of being a German spy, but she is reluctant to say anything to the authorities. She learns later, while she is working in a munitions factory, that it would have been better if she had spoken up.
Girl of Distinction, A; A Tale of the Karroo		1912	1923	SOUTH AFRICA	Celia is called home from her music school in Cape Town because she is needed to help on her family's ostrich farm in the Karroo country. She works hard to run the farm while her father and sister are ill, but she hopes for a better life somehow.
Girl of the Fortunate Isles, A: A Story of New Zealand		1907	1907	NEW ZEALAND	Set in New Zealand, Margaret hears that her step brother has absconded with a large amount of money. She decides to work to earn enough to pay it back so that her invalid mother can be spared any distress.
Girl of the Northland, A		1913, 1933	1940	Alaska	The Scarth family lives in Alaska. The father has gone prospecting for gold, and the oldest daughter Olive tries to hold the family together.
Girl of the Pampas, A		1921		ARGENTINA	Averil lives on the Dogberry estancia in Argentina with her uncle and his wife and their son. She becomes involved in trying to fix problems with the cattle and horses and also problems caused by an unfair will, left by her uncle's wife's father that jeopardizes their ownership of the estancia.
Girl Undaunted, A or The Honey Queen		1939		AFRICA	Selfish, self-centered Maleeny and her more agreeable sister Bridget have been sent from the city to spend time with their uncle, who lives in a rural part of Africa. There they meet Patience, a cousin from a remote part of Africa called the Raff. Patience is running away from an obligation to serve as the Honey Queen for a demanding old woman, Karkatura, who rules over a man-free portion of the Raff.
Girls of Wakenside, The; A Story for Girls		1904		CANADA	Set in the Canadian Rockies, a number of romantic relationships endure accidents, misunderstandings, and disappearances.
Glenallan's Daughters		1928	1929	MALAYSIA	In Malaysia, Kitty and Ro hope to solve the mystery of their mother's disappearance and prove their father innocent of any involvement in the scuttling of two ships.
Gold-Marked Charm, The: The Story of a Mystery in the Blue Nile Country		1918, 1827	1937	SUDAN	A girl living in 'Soudan' manages a horse/camel ranch with little help from her father.
Greta's Domain: A Tale of Chiloe		1911	1931	SOUTH AMERICA, CHILE	Greta and her younger brother and sister, along with their mother are sailing to England from South America when they are forcibly put off their ship because the captain thinks they might have smallpox. Greta helps them to have a comfortable life and solves several mysteries.
Half-moon Girl, The, or, The rajah's daughter	Nook	1898, 1899?		BORNEO	A girl tries to find the will of her uncle which has been entrusted to a local girl in what seems to be Borneo.
Harriet Goes A'Roaming		1922	1933	CANADA	Harriet travels with a family friend who hopes to collect an inheritance in Canada, and finds that she must survive on her own.
Held at Ransom: A Story of Colonial Life		1901, 1926	1928	SOUTH AFRICA	A young girl, Judy, and her brother Billy, and lame sister, Rosalie, live on a ranch in South Africa. An Englishman traveler helps them rescue their father who is being held for ransom by bandits.
Helen of the Black Mountain: A Story of Montenegro		1914, 1927		MONTENEGRO	Set in Montenegro, the story tells of Helen who must try to find her father who has disappeared. It is thought that he has been kidnapped by bandits, but his capture turns out to have political reasons.
Her Own Kin: A Story of a Girl in Canada.		1925	1925	CANADA	A girl's guardians die without signing their wills, leaving her penniless.
Heroine of the Ranch, The/A - a Story of Tierra Del Fuego		1914		SOUTH AMERICA, Tierra Del Fuego	A girl's mother wants her to go to school in the city so that she will not become interested in running the family horse ranch.
Heroine of the Sea, A: A Story of Vancouver Island		1904	1938	CANADA, British Columbia	Maudie, a girl fisherman, tries to prove the innocence of her brother, Basil, who was accused of murder
Hilda Holds On		1929		MEXICO	Hilda Stormont lives with her old uncle, helping him run his silver mine in Mexico. When he dies intestate, she finds herself disinherited when his long lost wife and the daughter whom he thought to be dead appear and claim ownership.
His Great Surrender		1912		CANADA	John Caryl turns down the comfortable living in England offered to him by the bishop in order to devote himself to ministering to a group of rough miners in Canada.
Homesteader Girl, The		1932	1939	CANADA, British Columbia	Rose and her brother Frank are trying to live on a homestead in British Columbia long enough to make it their own.
Hope's Tryst: A Story of the Siberian Frontier		1905	1930	SIBERIA, MONGOLIA	Hope Delayne lives in Kiakhta on the border between Siberia and Mongolia.
Hosea's Girl			1941	ARGENTINA	Marta has always helped her father, Hosea, manage Macmayo, their horse-breeding ranch in Argentina. After his death, she is forced to take on even more responsibility.
House at Brambling Minster, The		1902		ENGLAND ?	Ethel, Nesta, May, and Dick, and their cousins Tom and Reggie, along with their governess, Miss Powell, spend the summer in a house in the country which is said by local people to be haunted.
How Nell Scored		1929	1933	New Zealand ?	Nell and her sister Sue are left at home with their aunt, while their parents go off to help their older brother David, who has been injured. Nell manages to save 2 men from a foundered ship, who are revealed to have connections with her family.
Humbling of Mark Lester, The		1899			
In Perilous Times: a tale of old canterbury		1901	1908	ENGLAND	Queen Mary is on the throne and Protestants are being persecuted. John Tynely, a devout Protestant, is trying to survive after his brother has had all his property forfeited and has been burned at the stake for his beliefs.
In the Cradle of the North Wind		1896		CANADA, Newfoundland	Mrs Moffat and her two boys, Gordon & Guy, await the return of Mr Moffat from the sea voyage to Newfoundland of the Aurora, a sailing ship of which he is the captain. But when Mr Moffat returns, he brings sad news, and this leads to great adventures for them all.
In the Toils of the Tribesman: A Story of the Indian Frontier		1900	1904	INDIA	Coralie lives in a remote part of India with her missionary father and her mother and sister. Knowledge of arms smuggling comes to Coralie and her father and he determines to risk his life to let the British authorities know about it. Coralie has to maintain and save her family in his absence.
Island Born: A Tale of Hawaii		1921		Hawaii	A girl braves an erupting volcano to prove that her deceased father was innocent of stealing bonds from his company.
Island Heroine, An		1909		SOUTH AMERICA, Patagonia, Falkland Islands	Rose and Oliver's older brother Sam has finally found work, but it is as a shepherd in Patagonia. Rose and Oliver decide to go with him, but when Oliver breaks his leg, they have to remain on the Falkland Islands while Sam goes on alone.
Jane Fills the Breach		1922		ARGENTINA	Jane helps run the family wool exporting business in Argentina after her step brother and step sister disappear.
Jenny's Adventure or, On the Trail for Klondyke		1909	1910	Alaska	Jenny and her brother Johnny have been left by their father in Juneau while he travels to the Klondike Goldfields in hopes of making his fortune.
Joyce Harrington's Trust; An Argentine Mystery		1916, 1926		ARGENTINA	Joyce Harrington and her disorganized and procrastinating family live on a ranch in Argentina growing grapes and peaches.They come close to ruin because of mistakes and carelessness.
Julliet The Mail Carrier		1907	1929	CANADA, Newfoundland	A girl living in New Foundland takes over a mail route that her injured father cannot do, and solves crimes relating to smuggling.
Kenealy's Ride - A Tale of the Pampas		1902, 1906?		ARGENTINA	Young Bounce Kenealy lives in Argentina with his mother and his sister Babs, and his older brothers Israel and Dick. Together they run a large horse & cattle estancia
Laurel the Leader		1930	1931	AFRICA	Laurel's father does not return from a baboon hunting trip, and, with the help of her brothers and her neighbors, Laurel must manage the farm, look after her delicate mother, and find her father.
Leonard's Temptation: A Story of Gambling		1902		ENGLAND	Leonard is tempted to gamble, and in this way brings ruin, not only to himself, but also his upright brother, Robert. But slowly, they are able to build a new life, and Leonard becomes a more honest man.
Lesbia's Little Blunder		1934	1935	CANADA	Lesbia and her younger siblings Jim and Sappy, are left in charge of the family store while their father gets medical help for their mother in a distant town. Lesbia makes a bad decision when she accepts some valuable papers to be held in the store's safe, and she and her brother and sister have many adventures trying to recover from the problems that result from this blunder.
Lois in Charge - Or, A Girl of Grit - The Story of a Plantation in Brazil		1918, 1928	1918	BRAZIL	Lois lives on her father's coffee plantation in Brazil. When the Black Hand, an extortion ring, becomes active in their area, Lois's father's stepson Jim has to go into hiding to escape them, leaving his own coffee plantation. Lois steps in to help run Jim's plantation, and uses clues she has discovered in order to bring an end to the Black Hand's activities.
Lost On The Saguenay (title as published by William Collins, Sons & Co of London and Glasgow)					See entry for "Delmayne's Adventures; or, Lost On The Saguenay"
Loyalty Of Hester Hope, The: A Story Of British Columbia		1914		CANADA, British Columbia	A girl takes a position to avoid living with a new stepmother, and has to run a ranch and look after a lost Dukabor girl.
Lucie's Luck		1928		BAHAMAS	Lucie lives with her grandfather who makes his living from salvage from shipping wrecks in the outer islands of the Bahamas. Lucie wishes for a more glamorous and important life, but finds many opportunities for heroism close to home.
Maisie's Discovery		1906		CHILE	In a remote part of Chile, Maisi is left alone when her Uncle Edwin dies, and she is taken in by the local English clergyman, John Graily and his sister Sue. Maisie learns secrets about her past, and John and Sue get caught up in a local revolution.
Marta the Mainstay		1940	1944	SWEDEN, Stockholm	Marta's family goes to Stockholm, Sweden to recover from the ruin and scandal caused by her father's business partner.
Millicent Gwent Schoolgirl		1926		ENGLAND	Millicent warns landowner Col Lucas about thieves who plan to steal his historic silver, and as a reward, Col Lucas sends her to a well-regarded boarding school, where she has troubles and successes.
Miss Wilmer's Gang		1938		CHILE	Molly, Violet, Roldy, Daphne, Pris, and Lettice have been gathered by Miss Wilmer, to try to establish a life in 2 remote islands some distance from Punta Arenas, Chile, which Miss Wilmer has recently inherited.
Mistress of Purity Gap, The		1921		ECUADOR	Elsie Cobb is trying to run her family's large ranch in Ecuador.
Molly Angel's Adventures. a Tale of the German Occupation of Belgium (also as A Story of Belgium under German Occupation)		1915	1921	BELGIUM	Molly Angel has come down with the measles, and is left by her parents with Buffy and Lena Bowen and their parents in Belgium. When Mr & Mrs Bowen must return to England, the 3 children are left on their own as the German invasion takes place.
Molly in the West		1927	1941	CANADA, Manitoba	Molly runs away from home to escape the demands of her stepmother, and when she is lost walking in a blizzard, she stumbles on a remote cottage with a seriously ill woman and baby, and finds herself tied to looking after them.
Molly of One Tree Bend - A Story of a Girl's Heroism on the Veldt		1910	1912	SOUTH AFRICA	Molly and her uncle scrape together a bare living in South Africa. When Molly discovers that her uncle is a racing tout who encourages young men to gamble and leads them to ruin, she is devastated, and hopes to change him.
Most Popular Girl in the School, The		1924		ENGLAND	Mary Devain is a boarder from Brazil at Raglan College, a school she loves. But she is tormented at school by other Brazilian girls who claim that her father is a 'spy' because he works for the Brazilian government's intelligence.
Mysterious City, The; A Story of the Congo		1905	1906	CONGO	A young man assists his uncle in an exploration in the Congo.
Mysterious Inheritance, A; A Story of Adventure in British Columbia		1915, 1926	1943	CANADA, British Columbia	Sisters make a life for themselves on a farm and run a butter factory in British Columbia.
Mystery of Silver Run, The		1907	1910	PERU	15 year-old Rob Kennedy is going to help his father in their silver mine in the mountains of Peru, while his mother and younger siblings stay in the warmer valley. At the mine, he meets Curly, an orphan boy not much older, Curly has a mission to find the true criminals behind a silver robbery and to clear his father's name, and Rob helps him. (This novel was reproduced in the volume "Sunday Reading for the Young 1906, a collection of issues of that magazine.)
Nancy Afloat		1936	1953	NEW ZEALAND	A girl from New Zealand clears her ship-captain father's name & exposes a criminal gang that plants explosives on ships to destroy them and collect the insurance money.
No Ordinary Girl: a Story of Central America		1907	1941	PANAMA	After Daisy Kennard graduates from her Canadian school with honors, she takes a teaching job in Panama. She hopes to be able to learn more about her mother and father who died there, and also about her sister who disappeared at the same time.
Norah to the Rescue: A Story of the Philippines		1919		PHILIPPINES	A young woman foils a political uprising in the Philippines.
Old House By the Water, The		1894	1901	ENGLAND ?	Pansy Vant is sent home from India to spend a year with her mother's parents. While there she meets her father's estranged family and her goodness brings them all together again.
On the Track - Or Among The Torches Of The Andes (title as published by Sampson Low, Marston & Co of London)		1890, 1898	1929	PERU	After his grandfather's death, Richard Austen finds papers which tell of adventure & gold treasure in Peru.
Owner of Rushcote, The		1903	1913	ENGLAND ?	Wallace Frere is the dissolute estate owner of the Rushcote area who is brought to an appreciation of religion and finds his true love through a series of challenges and events.
Princess of Servia, A: A Story of Today		1912	1931	SERBIA	A Canadian young woman, Mary, moves with her widowed father to his native country Servia, and gets caught up in royal intrigues.
Queen of Shindy Flat, The		1905	1905	VENEZUELA	Priccola Witchett, called Prickly, or, more often, The Queen of Shindy Flat, was the only female living with her father in a small gold mining camp in Venezuela. She is disappointed to be left behind when her father and a companion go to the nearest city with the week's gold - but this turns out to be lucky, because when he disappears, she is able to help rescue him.
Rachel Out West		1923		CANADA, British Columbia	Rachel and her two brothers try to make a life in British Columbia.
Redwood Ranch (Adventures of a boy lost in a California forest)		1911		USA, California	Mary's father is missing, and her brother Oscar goes to search for him, but becomes lost in the redwood forests of California.
Rolf the Rebel (Exciting adventures and hairbreadth escapes in Cuba)		1908	1908	CUBA	Rolf is shipwrecked and ends up in Cuba, where he becomes involved in helping rebels who are trying to free Cuba from the rule of Spain.
Sally Makes Good - A Story of Tasmania		1920		AUSTRALIA, Tasmania	Sally's father is given a small estate when he retires from the military - but it is located in Tasmania! When Sally and her family move there to take up their new way of life, they stumble on many adventures, and Sally proves that she is as good a daughter as her clever older sisters.
Secret of the Everglades, The: A Story of Adventure in Florida		1902, 1915	1916	USA, Florida	Millicent Osney realizes that her family has been left quite poor after her father's death.
Sibyl of St. Pierre, The		1912		FRENCH WEST INDIES, Martinique	Maurice Rowan and his school friends are left on Martinique to manage alone during the eruption of Mount Pelée.
Silla the Seventh		1932	1936	CANADA, Ontario, Georgian Bay	Drusilla, from Toronto, goes to live with her difficult Aunt Eliza in Georgian Bay after her father remarries.
Sisters of Silver Creek: A Story of Western Canada		1908, 1925		CANADA, Saskatchewan	English sisters Kitty, Sue, and fragile 15-year-old Pattie are left poor orphans after their mother dies, but are offered a home with their Uncle Ben in Assiniboia, a town in Saskatchewan, Canada.
Sylvia's Secret: A Tale of the West Indies		1924		JAMAICA	Sylvia's father is injured while saving one of his plantation hands from an attack by an electric eel, so Sylvia must take over management of the plantation which is located on an island off Jamaica.
Tell-Tale-Tit		1899	1926	ENGLAND, London	Mamie Dodds gets in trouble with her schoolmates because she always tells the truth - even if it gets everyone in trouble. But she keeps this habit even into her young adult years and, in the end, it serves her well.
That Dreadful Boy!		1901	1910	ENGLAND	When Jim Blake was young, he di not study or work, and he teased the other children and they referred to him as 'that dreadful boy'. But through a series of adventures, he (along with several other characters) becomes more religious and gains happiness.
Three Girls in Mexico: A Story of Life in the Interior		1910	1909	MEXICO	Marion and Maud live with their stepmother and step-sister Muriel on an estate in Mexico. Through a chance encounter with a local woman, Marion learns how to make perfume from the local orchids, and is able to start a business that will support them all.
Three Girls on a Ranch: A Story of New Mexico		1901		USA, New Mexico	The Lovell family buys a ranch in New Mexico with money they inherited.
To Save Her School	Kindle	1925?, 1926		ENGLAND	Junia tries for the Simon Dobbs Scholarship at Bemworth High School.
Tommy's Trek: A Transvaal Story		1901	1925	SOUTH AFRICA	A short tale about a young boy in South Africa who must make his way alone when separated from his mother.
Transport Girl in France, A: The Story of the Adventures of a W.A.A.C.		1919	1923	FRANCE	Set in the time of WWI, Gwen wants to help with the war effort. She has trained herself to drive a car, in hopes of being able to be a driver at the war front in France. She is given a chance to go to the front, where she proves herself capable of good driving and heroism, and helps in the capture of a spy-saboteur.
Triumphs of Three, The		1942		CANADA, British Columbia	Vi receives a 250-pound reward for thwarting a jewel robbery. This money allows Vi, her twin sister Benna, and her brother Charles to travel to Canada to make a new life for themselves in British Columbia.
Two New Girls, The	Kindle	1927		ENGLAND	Two girls, both named Rose, attend the same school.
Two of a Kind		1941		CANADA, British Columbia	Vera and Ann and their mother leave England for Canada, where they join up with their mother's brother's family, including Van, Rob, and Tommy, in British Columbia.
Two on Their Own		1931		CANADA, Quebec, Gaspe Peninsula	Judith is staying for the summer with her cousin Audrey and her mother in a remote part of the Gaspe peninsula. When Audrey's mother leaves unexpectedly, the girls are thrown on their own resources.
Uncle Greg's Man Hunt - A Story of Texan Horse-Thieves		1906	1911	USA, Texas	Greg Fotsam visits his nephew's school and tells the boys about his adventures with horse thieves in Texas.
Under Clearer Skies			1892	ENGLAND, London	Lovelace escapes her dreary life in London when she is invited to stay with an uncle who is trying to introduce Methodism to the people in a small village.
Unknown Island, The: A Tale of Adventure in the Seychelles		1916, 1929		SEYCHELLES	A girl and her two younger brothers are shipwrecked on a deserted island in the Seychelles.
VAD In Salonika, A. A Tale of a Girl's Work in the Great War		1917	1917	GREECE, Salonika	Joan makes a mistake that allows a spy to gain secret information. To atone for her error, she volunteers with a VAD group on its way to Salonika. There her hard work and good motorbiking skills save the day.
Waifs of Woollamoo: a Story for Girls		1938		AUSTRALIA	Australian children try to maintain their farms when their parents leave to join a gold rush.
Weasel Tim		1896	1901	ENGLAND	Timothy Marks suffers because he is the son of a poacher and traveling tin-ware seller and people assume that he is not honest. They call him Weasel Tim. But Tim tries to stand by his father, and still remain honest and good, and he succeeds.
Western Scout, The (The adventures of a boy scout)		1912	1916	CANADA, British Columbia	Elgar Hunt was a scout in England, and when he immigrates to Vancouver City in Canada, he remembers the scouting precepts - to help those in need and to work hard - and these principles help him deal with the adventures that he experiences.
Winning His Wy, A Story for Boys		1899	1910	ENGLAND, London	Young Dan is an orphan trying to make his way on the streets of London, while his brother is in a reformatory for stealing. Dan meets several people who are good to him, and he is also exposed to religion, which is a help to him in leading a good and honest life.
Yew Tree Farm - A Story of a Separate Career		1904	1904	ENGLAND	When Charlotte's step-father remarries, Charlotte decides to leave home and run a small farm with the help of her 2 sisters and a young cousin. They work hard to make their farm a success and also to help clear the name of their father's new wife who has been unjustly accused of forging a check.
Youngest Sister, The - A Tale of Manitoba	gutenberg.org Kindle; Nook	1913		CANADA, Manitoba	A girl proves that she is as competent as her two older sisters (one marries an Australian, the other travels to Europe to study music) by helping her cousin on a farm in Manitoba.
Yuppie		1898, 1907		ENGLAND	Includes two short stories. 'Yuppie' is the story of a crippled boy who hears an evangelical preacher and is influenced for the good. And 'The Land beyond the Flood' tells the tale of Rowley, a newspaper seller, who is encouraged to change his bad ways because of hearing the preaching of a compelling woman and because of feeling the force of heavenly justice as expressed in a big storm with thunder and lightning.

Listed below are books attributed to Bessie Marchant published under the name John Comfort.

Title	Available Formats	Publication Date	Presentation Date	Location	Plot Summary
Don's Doings (A story of life in Western Canada)		1929		CANADA	Young Don is left on his own when his older brother does not come back from rounding up their cattle. He discovers that he can manage on his own, alone: he brings home someone else's herd of cattle that he runs into while looking for his own, he rescues a sick man and looks after him until he is well, and he locates the sick man's lost daughter. His many adventures convince him that he knows what he is doing, even though he is still young.
Matt Desmond's Bit (The story of a brave boy who does his bit in the war)		1920		ENGLAND	Matt Desmond's father is away at war, and he is at home from school, recovering from a serious illness. He does not like being idle, and is happy to get a chance to help the owner of a beach-side donkey ride business. This work leads to his discovery and capture of German spies.
Nobby: A Son of Empire		1913	1920	CANADA ?	Noble "Nobby" Brown is determined to find the money that was stolen from his father.
On His Own (The adventures of a little English boy who went to Canada "on his own")		1918		CANADA	Young Tom Brown is traveling with his older brother, Thack, to make a new life in a remote small town in Canada. Tom and his brother are separated, and Tom travels alone and has to manage by himself.
River Tramp, The (The story of a boy's adventures among the rubber camps of Upper Orinoco)		1913		VENEZUELA	Roy hears talk that his father, whom he has always though was dead, is living far up river. Roy decides to try to find his father and experiences many trials during his search.
Rustler's Revenge		1931		CANADA, Saskatchewan	Bert Fletcher and his friend Dick live on homestead ranches in Saskatchewan. Local cattle rangers, who resent the homesteaders, kill Dick's brother while trying to drive the homesteaders away, Bert becomes entangled in the problems caused by Dick's attempts to get revenge for his brother's death.
Toby's Luck		1922		SOUTH AFRICA	Toby's father has been under suspicion of having aided the criminals who stole gold bars from his workplace. Toby determines to discover the real thieves and to clear his father.
