= Utterson =

Utterson may refer to:

- Gabriel John Utterson, a central character in Strange Case of Dr Jekyll and Mr Hyde (1886)
- Edward Vernon Utterson (1775/1776–1856), English lawyer, literary antiquary, collector and editor
- Jimmy Utterson (1914–1935), English footballer
- Kevin Utterson (born 1976), Scottish rugby player
- Sarah Elizabeth Utterson (1781–1851), English translator and author
- Shaun Utterson (born 1990), English footballer
- Utterson, Ontario, a community in Huntsville, Ontario

== See also ==
- John Utterson-Kelso (1893–1972), British Army officer
