= Tales of the Dead =

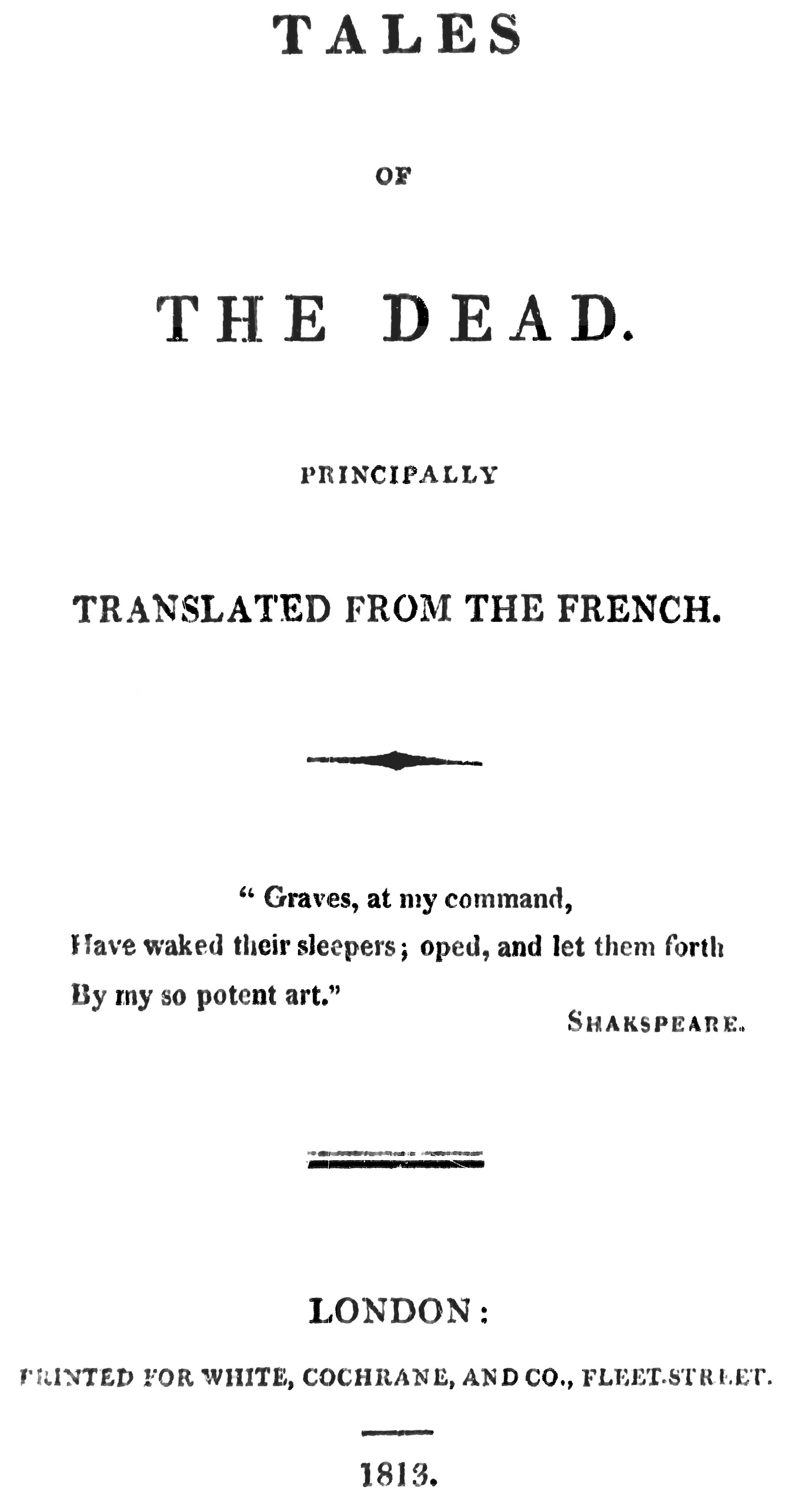
- First edition title page
- Author: Johann August Apel, Friedrich Laun, Johann Karl August Musäus, Sarah Elizabeth Utterson
- Translator: Sarah Elizabeth Utterson
- Genre: Gothic fiction
- Published: 1813 (White, Cochrane and Co.)
- Media type: Print, Octavo
- Pages: 248
- OCLC: 222188552
- Text: Tales of the Dead at Wikisource

Tales of the Dead is an English anthology of horror fiction, abridged from the French book Fantasmagoriana and translated anonymously by Sarah Elizabeth Utterson, who also added one story of her own. It was published in 1813 by White, Cochrane and Co.

== Development ==
Sarah Elizabeth Utterson translated the majority of Tales of the Dead from a French collection of ghost stories as "the amusement of an idle hour". Three of the stories from the French she omitted as they "did not appear equally interesting" to her. She also noted she had "considerably curtailed" her translation of "L'Amour Muet", "as it contained much matter relative to the loves of the hero and heroine, which in a compilation of this kind appeared rather misplaced". To these, Utterson added a story of her own, "The Storm" based on an incident told to her by "a female friend of very deserved literary celebrity" as having actually occurred. It was published anonymously in 1813 by White, Cochrane, and Co., replacing the original epigraph "Falsis terroribus implet. — HORAT" (meaning roughly "he fills [his breast] with imagined terrors") with the following quote from William Shakespeare's The Tempest:

Graves, at my command,
Have waked their sleepers; oped, and let them forth
By my so potent art.

The French book Utterson translated from was Fantasmagoriana (its title is derived from Étienne-Gaspard Robert's Phantasmagoria), which had in turn been translated anonymously by Jean-Baptiste Benoît Eyriès (1767–1846) from a number of German ghost stories, and published in Paris during 1812. His sources included "Stumme Liebe" ("Silent Love") from Volksmärchen der Deutschen by Johann Karl August Musäus (1735–1787), "Der grau Stube" ("The Grey Room") by Heinrich Clauren (1771–1854), and six stories by Johann August Apel (1771–1816) and Friedrich Laun (1770–1849), five of which were from the first two volumes of their ghost story anthology Gespensterbuch ("The Ghost Book"); originally published in five volumes by G. J. Göschen in Leipzig between 1810 and 1815 under the pen names A. Apel and F. Laun.

Fantasmagoriana has a significant place in the history of English literature. In the summer of 1816 Lord Byron and John William Polidori were staying at the Villa Diodati by Lake Geneva and were visited by Percy Bysshe Shelley, Mary Wollstonecraft Shelley and Claire Clairmont. Kept indoors by the "incessant rain" of that "wet, ungenial summer", over three days in June the five turned to reading fantastical stories, including Fantasmagoriana (in the French edition), and then devising their own tales. Mary Shelley produced what would become Frankenstein, or The Modern Prometheus and Polidori was inspired by a fragmentary story of Byron's to produce The Vampyre, the progenitor of the romantic vampire genre. Some parts of Frankenstein are surprisingly similar to those found in Fantasmagoriana and suggest a direct influence upon Mary Shelley's writing.

Though Tales of the Dead was published anonymously, Utterson became known to be the translator by 1820. The Uttersons' copy was bound in blue straight-grain Morocco leather with gilt edges, inserted with a print by Samuel William Reynolds of a portrait of her by Alfred Edward Chalon and six original water colour drawings. It was sold with the library of Frederick Clarke of Wimbledon in 1904 to B. F. Stevens for £3 3s, acquired into the library of Robert Hoe III by 1905 and eventually passed into the Huntington Library.

== The stories ==
Tales of the Dead	Fantasmagoriana	German title	German source	Author
"The Family Portraits"	"Portraits de Famille"	"Die Bilder der Ahnen"	Cicaden, vol. 1	Apel
"The Fated Hour"	"L'Heure Fatale"	"Die Verwandtschaft mit der Geisterwelt"	Gespensterbuch, vol. 1	Laun
"The Death's Head"	"La Tête de Mort"	"Der Todtenkopf"	Gespensterbuch, vol. 2	Laun
"The Death-Bride"	"La Morte Fiancée"	"Die Todtenbraut"	Gespensterbuch, vol. 2	Laun
"The Storm"	N/A	N/A	N/A	Utterson
"The Spectre-Barber"	"L'Amour Muet"	"Stumme Liebe"	Volksmärchen der Deutschen, vol. 4	Musäus
N/A	"Le Revenant"	"Der Geist des Verstorbenen"	Gespensterbuch, vol. 1	Laun
N/A	"La Chambre Grise"	"Die graue Stube (Eine buchstäblich wahre Geschichte)"	Der Freimüthige (newspaper)	Clauren
N/A	"La Chambre Noire"	"Die schwarze Kammer. Anekdote"	Gespensterbuch, vol. 2	Apel

=== The Family Portraits ===
Family tree of characters in "The Family Portraits"

Unnamed second wife	Bruno de Hainthal	Bertha	Ditmar de Wartbourg	Unnamed wife
Adalbert de Meltheim	Hildegard de Hainthal
Countess de Meltheim	Count de Meltheim	Countess de Wartbourg	Count de Wartbourg	Baroness de Hainthal	Baron de Hainthal
Ferdinand de Meltheim	Julianna de Meltheim	Eldest de Wartbourg son	Emily de Wartbourg	Younger de Wartbourg son	Youngest de Wartbourg son	Clothilde de Hainthal	Unnamed young man
Ditmar de Meltheim

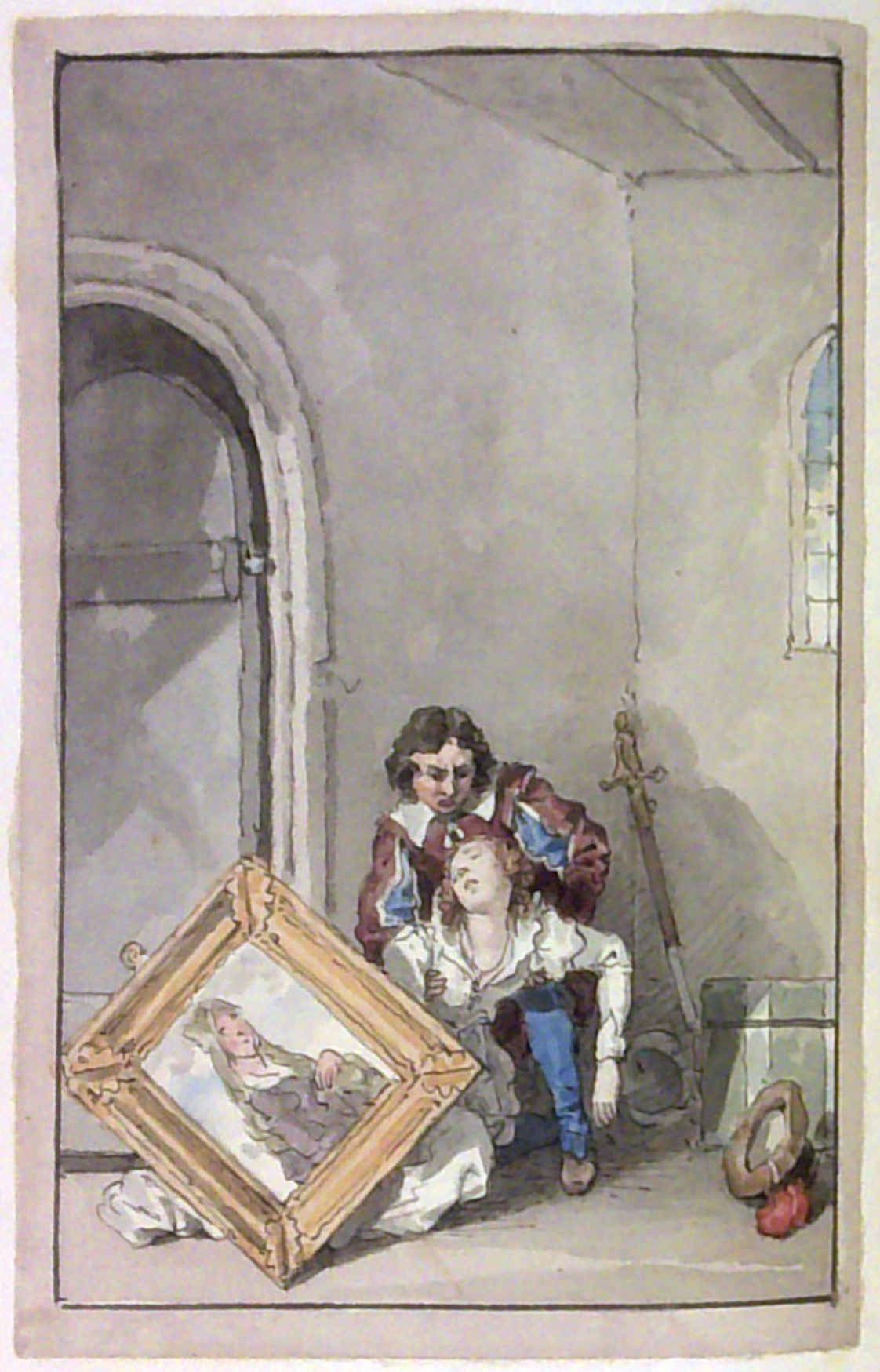
Unpublished illustration of "The Family Portraits" by Edward Vernon Utterson

The story is told through a series of sub-narratives, some nested inside others, within a framing narrative in the third person; it is characterized throughout by mistaken identity and resolves through the tracing of family lineage.

Count Ferdinand Meltheim, a member of the German nobility whose father has just died, is on his way to the carnival to meet Clotilde Hainthal for the first time, the woman his mother wishes him to marry, later revealed to be according to his father's dying wish. Reluctant to meet his intended, he stops at a village for the night and is drawn to a house from which he hears the sound of music, where he joins the company in telling ghost stories. A young woman (later revealed to be Clotilde) tells of a friend called Juliana (Ferdinand's sister, and the fiancée of his college companion), who was killed by a portrait that had terrified her as a child, which fell on her as she showed her fiancé around their house on the day before their marriage.

Ferdinand then tells a story about a friend (in fact himself) who stayed with a college companion and his family during a holiday, and got to know his young twin brothers and sister. The twins were scared by a deathlike portrait of their distant ancestor and founder of their family, called Ditmar, while Emily, the sister, was the only one who felt pity rather than revulsion for him. On the day before the friends were about to leave, the father, Count Wartbourg, hosted a series of amusements for them, and Emily encouraged Ferdinand to return in the autumn; he walked the twins to their room, but couldn't sleep, and after looking out of his window restlessly came to Ditmar's portrait, which terrified him to return to his chamber. Looking out of the window again, he saw a fog coming from the ruined tower in the grounds, in which he made out the form of Ditmar moving silently into the castle. As he checked the bed to make sure the boys were asleep, the ghost appeared at the side of the bed, and kissed the children, making Ferdinand pass out. He mentioned the night's events at breakfast to his host, who, grief-stricken but not surprised, announced that his sons would then die, but refused to explain it to even their brother. Three days after leaving, word reached Ferdinand that they had died, and their father died sometime after, without revealing the secret.

Reminded of Emily by Clotilde, he tries to find out her name, and the next day returns to ask the pastor, in whose house he had spent the previous evening. He is told the description matches Clotilde Hainthal, but is also informed that his college friend, the Count Wartbourg, had died after having the ruined tower pulled down, despite an ancient tradition that the family would survive only as long as the tower stood. Inside the tower, his friend had found a skeleton in female clothing, which he recognised as being the woman in the portrait that had killed Juliana, his betrothed; he passed out on the spot, and died soon after. Ferdinand was also told that Emily was now living with relatives in a castle nearby, and he decides to visit her there. On meeting Emily again, Ferdinand was surprised it was not the young lady he had met the day before, though she and her father arrive, and are introduced as Clotilde and Baron Hainthal. The Baron had been friends with the old Count Wartbourg, and had married his sister, privately told Ferdinand that if the male line of Wartbourg became extinct, as it had, everything would go to Ferdinand, as the direct descendant of Adalbert Meltheim. Shocked that it would not go to Emily, he raised it with her, saying he would pass it on to her rather than allow it to go to her next of kin, and they both declared their love for each other. Ferdinand's mother, however, would not consent to their marriage, as she had promised her late husband that Ferdinand must marry Clotilde; Baron Hainthal asked her to join them at the reading of Ditmar's will, when all would be explained.

Ditmar had accompanied the Holy Roman Emperor Otho to Italy, where he found and became engaged to Bertha of Pavia. However, his rival Bruno Hainthal demanded her of the Emperor as his wife, who had promised Bruno anything in his power. Ditmar was imprisoned for refusing to give her up, until the day of the wedding, when he relented in exchange for the tower he was imprisoned in and a new castle, and he plotted his revenge, building secret passages between the tower, his castle and that of Bruno. Once it was built, he killed Bruno and Bertha's son by kissing him with poison, but spared their daughter; Bruno remarried and divorced Bertha, who became a nun, but fled to the tower to confess her fault of marrying Bruno, and died there. Ditmar, finding her dead, went and attacked Bruno, and left him in the tower to starve. Ditmar was given Bruno's lands, and brought up his daughter with Bertha, who went on to marry Adalbert Meltheim. However, Bertha's ghost appeared to her, and said that she could never rest until one of her female descendants was killed by her (which was fulfilled by the death of Juliana Meltheim) after which the families of Ditmar and Bruno would be united by love. Ditmar was cursed too, and his portrait, painted by Tutilon of the Abbey of Saint Gall, was changed each night to be deathlike. Ditmar explained what he had done, and was absolved, but would remain as a ghost and would administer the kiss of death to every male descendant but one in each generation, until the tower fell down.

As Ferdinand was a descendant of Bruno and Bertha, and Emily was a descendant of Ditmar, Ferdinand's mother accepted that Emily fulfilled the condition of her husband's dying wish (intended to lift the curse described in a parchment attached to Bertha's portrait) and was happy to agree to their marriage. When Ferdinand and Emily had their first child, they all decided that he should be called Ditmar, and the ghostly portrait of his namesake at last faded away.

=== The Fated Hour ===
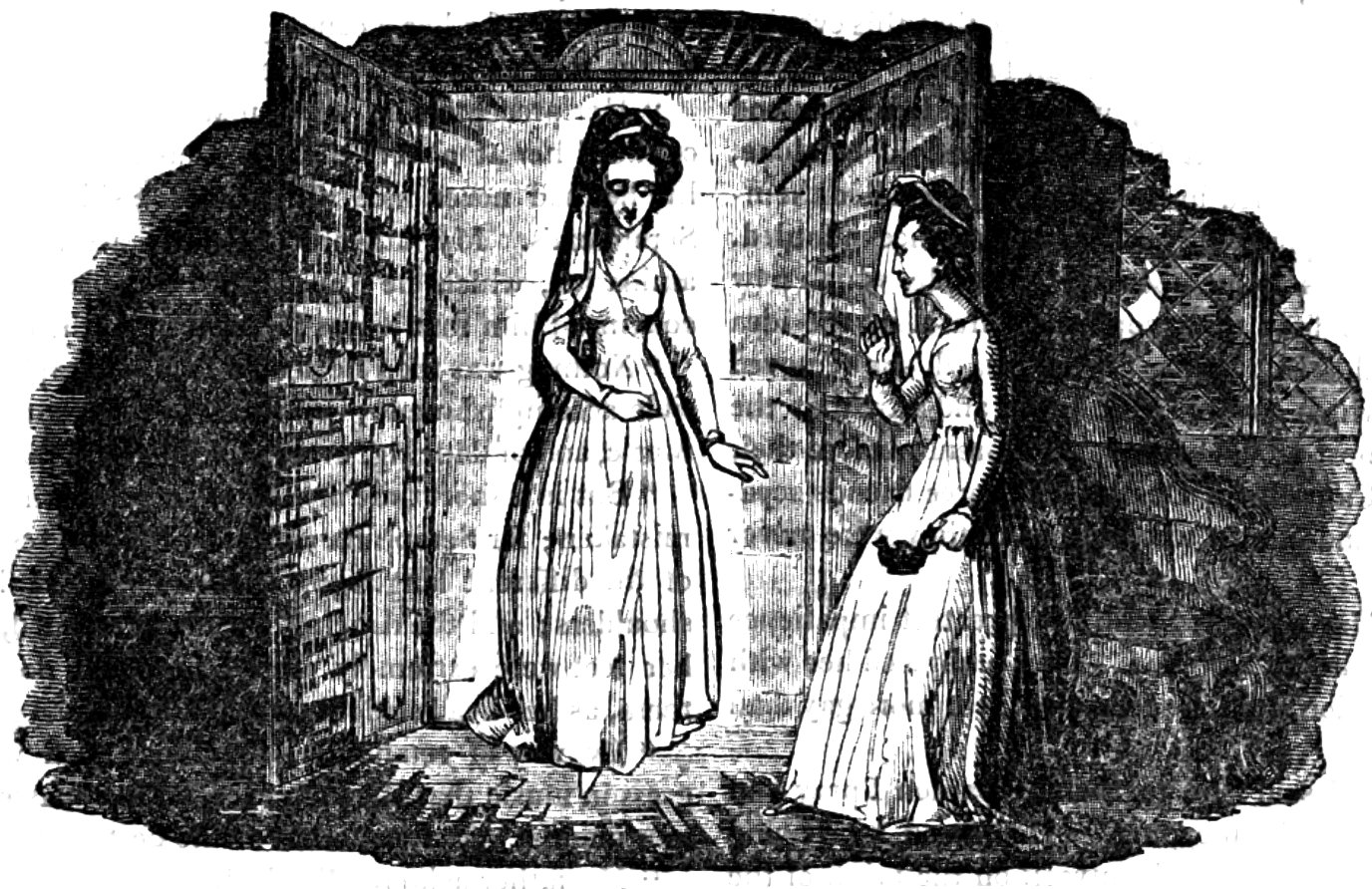
Illustration of "The Fated Hour" from The Penny Story-Teller

Sisters Maria and Amelia are worried about their friend Florentina who tells them a tale about her dead sister Seraphina. Seraphina would look off dazed for long periods of time. On one occasion Florentina saw Seraphina looking out the window in the garden. When Florentina looked out past her she saw her father and Seraphina walking together. When Florentina embraced her sister the likeness walking with her father in the garden disappeared. Later, Florentina goes to the upper story to get a garment from the wardrobe and comes back much later looking pale. She reveals that while upstairs she encounters an illuminated version of herself (her spirit). The spirit foretells her many things. One is that she will die at nine o'clock, which she does. Next her father, who had talked to Seraphina about her encounter has to leave his job (in a possible scandal) and says to Florentina that her sister's prophecy was right. She had predicted this. And later he becomes ill and tells Florentina that her sister predicted this as well and that at nine he would die, and so he does. Before he dies he tell Florentina that her sister said she would die if she married so he tells her to never marry. Maria and Amelia know that she is to marry a Count and Florentina says that she will die at nine. They see the clock is set to strike nine and Florentina gets up and the door opens by itself and she embraces an illuminated figure of her sister Seraphina and dies as the clock strikes nine, the fated hour.

=== The Death's Head ===
Calzolaro (whose real name is Schruster) arrives with his troop of performers at the inn of colonel Keilholm. He has come to the inn because it is in his home town and he is there to see about his inheritance. His father, the schoolmaster, had just died. The pastor informs him that his father disproved of this lifestyle, not following him in becoming a schoolmaster, and gave all his inheritance to a female relative. Calzolaro disputes her claim. Kielholm asks if Calzolaro would perform for the townspeople, especially since he is known to be an expert ventriloquist. He agrees and they set a stage at midnight with a human skull that he can manipulate and thus "talk" to the dead. However, at the performance he spears the skull on his sword and lifts it up to speak to it and collapses. He says that when he lifted the skull he saw the face of his father. They also find the pastor passed out. When the pastor wakes he confesses that he used the actual skull of his father because he heard that children who talked to their parents skulls at midnight would hear from them. Upon speaking to his dead father Calzolaro leaves his troop and becomes a schoolmaster. He drops his contest against the female relative and over time they fall in love and agree to marry. While walking in the garden something brings their hands together and they hear his father's voice say "may God bless your union" and they knew that all would be well.

=== The Death-Bride ===
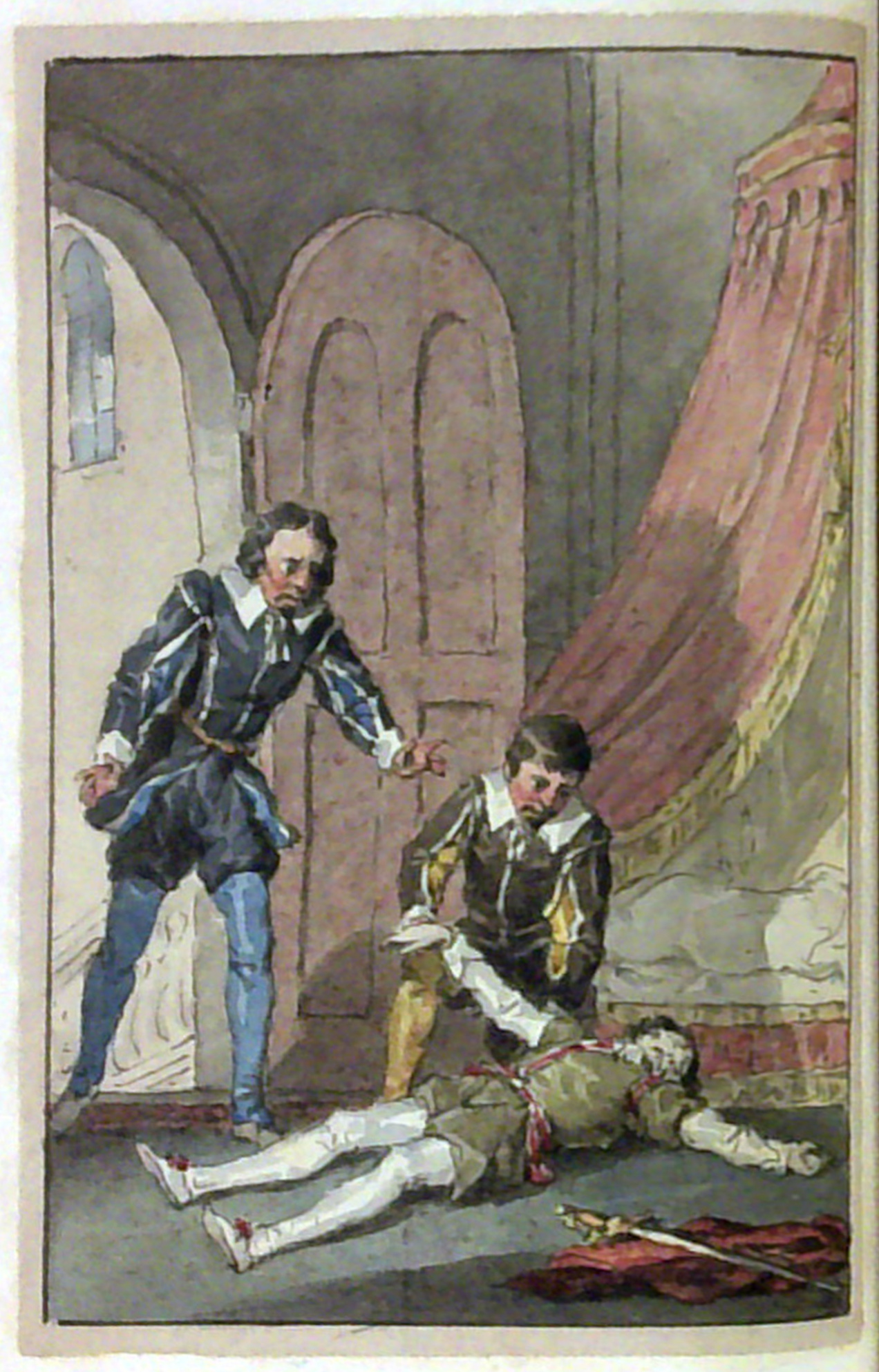
Unpublished illustration of "The Death-Bride" by Edward Vernon Utterson

A supposed Italian marquis tells his tale of the Death Bride at a party. Staying with a Count who had twin daughters, Ida and Hildegarde (Hildegarde, only different from her sister by a strawberry birthmark, had died). A Duke, Marino, comes to stay with them wanting to marry Ida. He says he saw her in Paris and fell in love. Her father says she have never been to Paris. The Duke says he saw her and her valet described the Count's villa and where to find it. He also says she had a strawberry birthmark on her neck. The Count say it was Hildegarde and they open her tomb but she is still within. At this time the marquis recognized the count and remembers that he was engaged to another woman. The count won't confess to the family what became of this engagement and as the marquis is fond of telling stories tells a tale to try and get the count to confess. The tale is of Filippo who was betrothed to Clara but later falls for Camilla. Clara kills herself when she is shunned by Filippo. On the wedding day of Camilla and Filippo, he sees Clara sneaking into the chapel and then attacking him. He falls down dead. Marino finally confesses but the wedding proceeds anyway as Ida is in love. The wedding is in Venice and everyone is wearing mask, as it is Carnival. One guest, a woman dressed in such splendid regalia, is suspiciously quiet and the father of Ida, the count, has everyone take off their mask. The woman doesn't and says nothing, points to Marino, and walks out of the room. The count follows but she has disappeared. At the wedding all goes well. Then Ida and the count dance. She gets tired and leaves. But a moment later she comes back, dances with Marino and then leaves with him to their bedchamber. Ida comes back to find everyone has left the reception. She asks where is Marino? Her parents are shocked and say she left with him to the bedchamber. She tells them that she had gone to her sister's room and had fallen asleep until just now. They all rush to the bedchamber and find Marino died on the floor, contorted. The marquis tours the town and finds out all he can about this Death Bride. She had been a noble lady who had scorned her lover and he had died. When she was to marry her dead lover appeared to her and she later died. Since then she wanders the land in the guise of lovers to temp men away and kills them. This was what had happened to Marino when he saw Hildegarde temping him from his betrothed. The story ends with the police looking for the marquis at the party. He runs out and is never seen from again.

=== The Storm ===
A wedding party in eighteenth-century Gascony is held at the château of the bridegroom's uncle. Many people from the surrounding area are invited, including some strangers. The host's daughter Emily befriends one of these, Isabella de Nunez, the widow of a Spanish officer of the Walloon Guards who had recently arrived in Gascony. An extremely heavy thunderstorm arrives, preventing the guests from leaving until the morning. The prospect of this terrifies Isabella, but Emily insists Isabella shares her room. Isabella reluctantly agrees, locks the door, and gets Emily to swear not to tell anyone what is about to happen until after she is dead. As the clock strikes midnight, a carriage is heard arriving despite the storm, followed by footsteps approaching the room, and the locked door opens. Emily soon faints, unable to bear whatever it is that she sees. Isabella leaves early the next morning, but Emily is found unconscious, and is revived by a doctor only to fall seriously ill. She recounts the contents of this story but not Isabella's secret, and dies after only a few days. Isabella also dies soon after, having "expired under circumstances of unexampled horror".

=== The Spectre-Barber ===
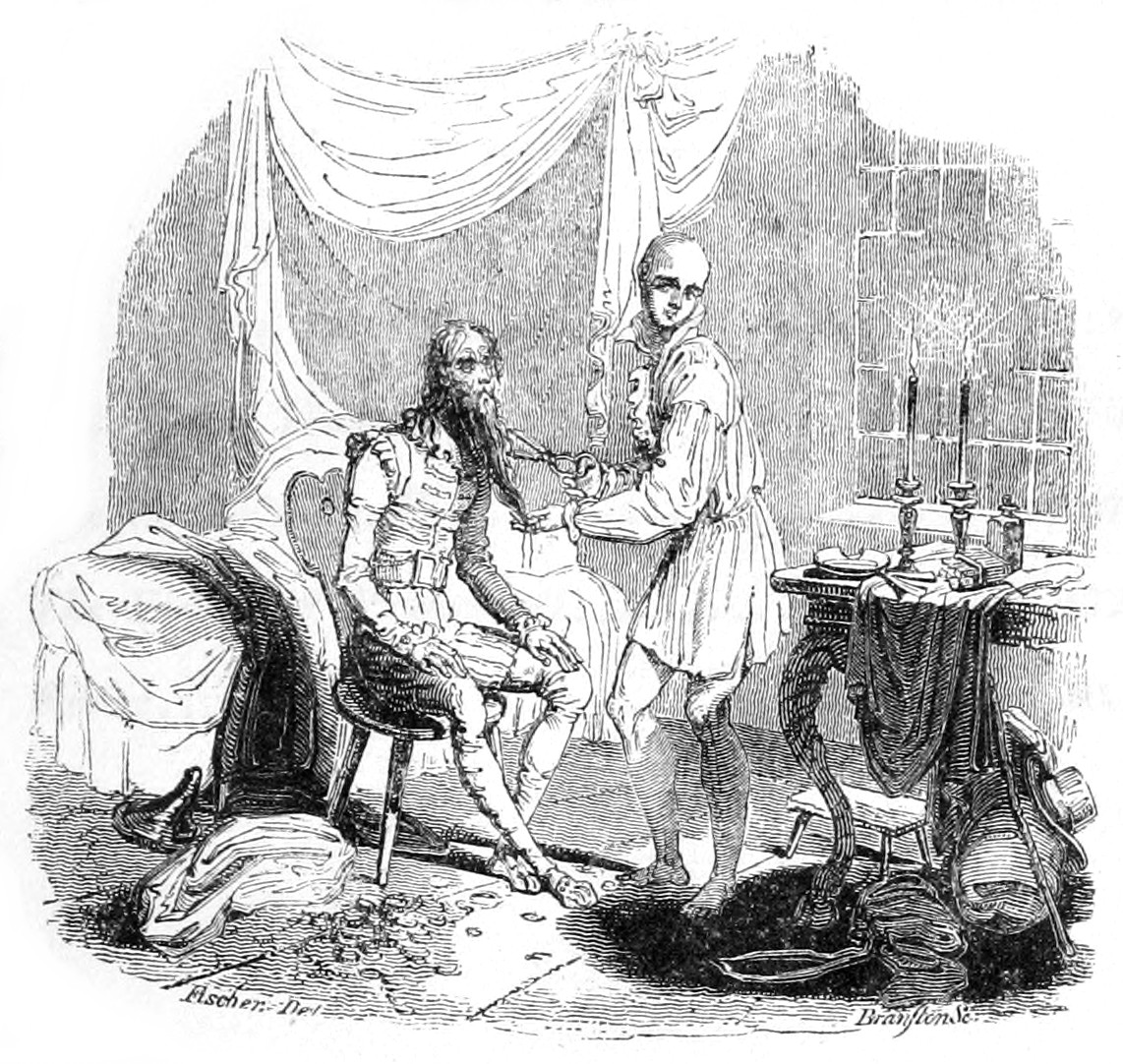
Illustration by John Fischer, engraved by Allen Robert Branston

"The Spectre-Barber" is set in sixteenth century Bremen. A wealthy merchant named Melchior dies suddenly and his son Francis inherits his father's wealth. Francis foolishly squanders his inheritance.

Francis spies a neighbour's daughter, a spinner named Meta, and falls in love with her. With an eye towards regaining fortune and earning Meta's hand in marriage, Francis sells his last possessions, purchases a horse, and sets out on a journey.

On his journey, Francis seeks shelter in a castle, despite rumours that the castle is haunted. In the middle of the night, Francis is awakened and sees the ghost of a barber sharpening his razors. The ghost motions to Francis, who complies and sits in front of the spectre. The spectre "placed the shaving-bib round his neck" and proceeds to remove all hair from Francis's head. Sensing that the spectre wants something, Francis "beckoned the phantom to seat himself in the chair", after which Francis shaves the spectre.

The ghost had been a barber during his life, whose lord would play "all sorts of malicious tricks" on strangers, including preparing a bath for guests, then having the barber shave guests beards and heads closely before suddenly throwing them out "with raillery and ridicule". One victim, a holy man, cursed the ghost to haunt the castle until someone "without being invited or constrained, shall do to you, what you have so long done to others".

In return for Francis having freed the ghost from the curse, the ghost tells Francis to return to Bremen at the Autumn equinox and wait for someone who will tell him what to do. At the appointed day, Francis meets a beggar who tells Francis of a dream in which an "angel stood at the foot of my bed" and told the beggar where to find buried treasure. Francis recognises the location from its description as a garden that had belonged to his father.

Francis re-purchases the garden and discovers the treasure. His fortune restored, Francis proposes marriage to Meta, who accepts.

== Later publications ==
Neither Tales of the Dead nor Fantasmagoriana received second editions during the remainder of the 19th century, and thus remained unavailable for most of the 20th century.

The books were printed anonymously, however, and so the individual stories were reprinted many times in various collections. Horace Welby's 1825 Signs before Death, and Authenticated Apparitions contained "The Storm" under the title "The Midnight Storm: (From the French)", as did William Charlton Wright's The Astrologer of the Nineteenth Century also published that year; Ambrose Marten's 1827 The Stanley Tales, Original and Select contained "The Spectre-Barber", "The Death's Head", "The Death-Bride", "The Fated Hour" and "The Storm"; The Penny Story-Teller for 15 August 1832 contained "The Fated Hour"; Henry Thomas Riley's 1837 The Continental Landscape Annual of European Scenery contained "The Spectre-Barber" under the title "The Merchant of Bremen"; the second volume of The Romanticist, and Novelist's Library in 1839 contained "The Spectre Barber"; Robert Bell's 1843 The Story-Teller; or, Table-Book of Popular Literature contained "The Spectre-Barber"; the 1840s The Annual Pearl: Or, Gift of Friendship contained "The Storm"; Henry F. Anners' 1851 Flowers of Loveliness: a Token of Remembrance, for 1852 contained "The Death's Head" under the title "The Ventriloquist of Marseilles", which was reprinted in Bernard Bowring's The Cabinet of Literary Gems; the 1867 edition of Mary Diana Dods' Tales of the Wild and the Wonderful contained "The Spectre-Barber"; L. W. de Laurence's 1918 The Old Book of Magic contained "The Storm" under the title "The Midnight Storm" and more recently, Peter Haining's 1972 Great British Tales of Terror contained "The Spectre Barber".

In 1992, the Gothic Society of London published a new edition, introduced and slightly revised by Dr. Terry Hale (1957–). A second edition was published in 1994, but was only available by mail order. Hale's version received a Greek language translation by Nikos Stampakis as Istories ton Nekron (Ιστορίες των Nεκρών), by publishing house Archetypo-Metaekdotiki during 2003. The Greek edition claims to be the first available in bookstores since the 1810s.

In 2005, the first "full" English translation of Fantasmagoriana was published by Fantasmagoriana Press. This edition included three additional tales that Mrs Utterson had omitted from her translation: translations of "Le Revenant", "La Chambre grise" and "La Chambre noire", which Day gave the titles "The Ghost of the Departed", "The Grey Room" and "The Black Chamber". The book also provided an academic essay by A. J. Day with possible evidence for Mary Shelley's visit to Burg Frankenstein in Germany, prior to the writing of her novel. However, it omits Utterson's translation of the French translator's preface, and reproduces her abridged translation of "L'Amour Muet".

Two of the stories from Tales of the Dead – "The Family Portraits" and "The Death-Bride" – reprinted by permission of Terry Hale as "the two stories from Fantasmagoriana that seem to have made the biggest impression on the Geneva circle", were included in the 2008 edition of The Vampyre and Ernestus Berchtold; or, The Modern Œdipus edited by D. L. Macdonald and Kathleen Scherf.
