= The Storm (Utterson short story) =

- Short story by Sarah Elizabeth Utterson
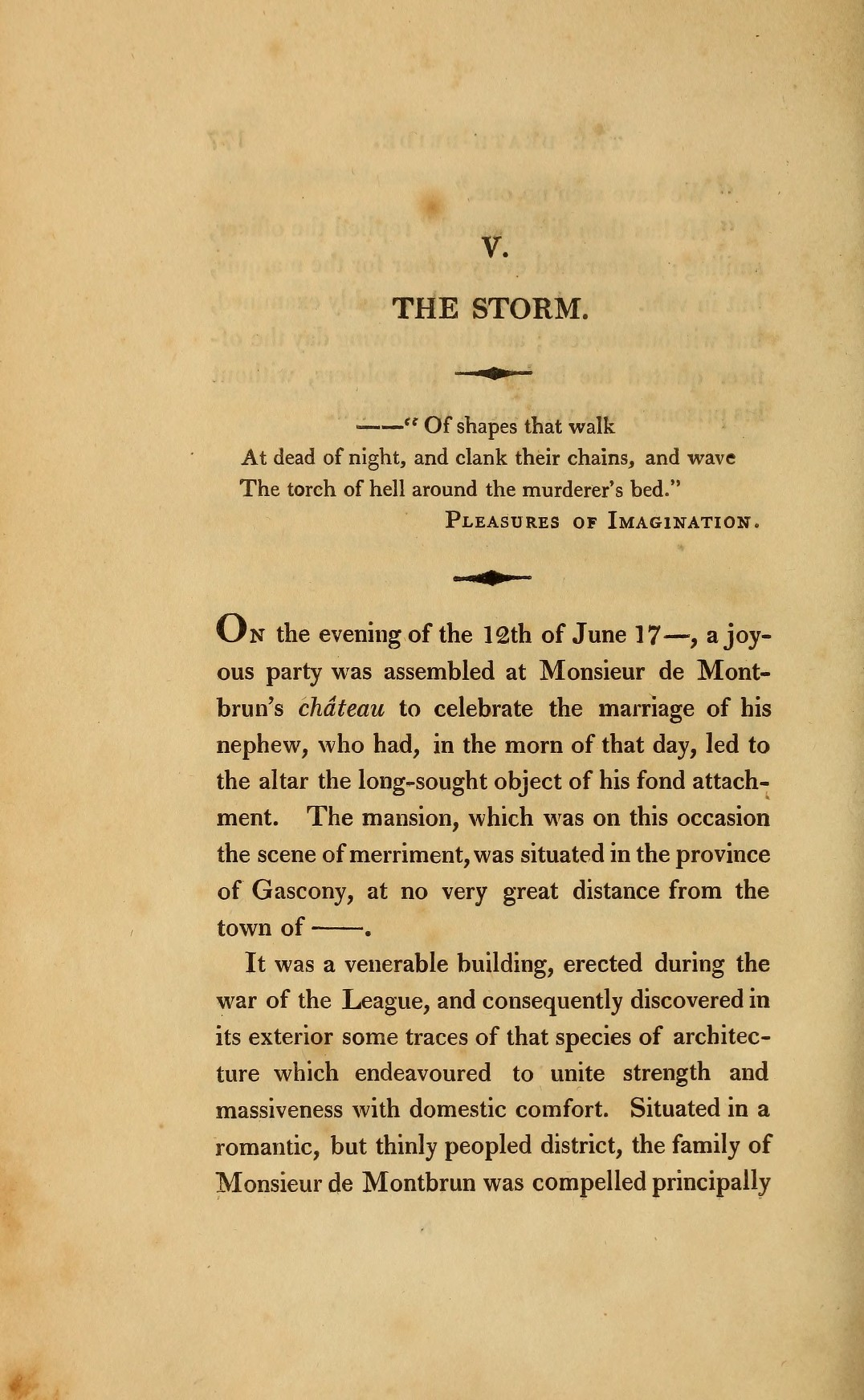
- First edition opening page

Text available at Wikisource
- Language: English
- Genre: Gothic horror

Publication
- Published in: Tales of the Dead
- Publication date: 1813

"The Storm" (sometimes reprinted as "The Midnight Storm") is a short story, written by Sarah Elizabeth Utterson, and published anonymously in Tales of the Dead (1813).

== Development ==
Sarah Elizabeth Utterson translated some stories into English from Fantasmagoriana (1812), a French collection of German ghost stories. She also wrote "The Storm", and included it with these translations as the fifth of six stories, publishing them anonymously as Tales of the Dead (1813). In the introduction she wrote:

The fifth tale, (or rather fragment,) is founded on an incident similar in its features, which was some years since communicated to me, by a female friend of very deserved literary celebrity, as having actually occurred in this country; and I have therefore no other claim in respect to it, than that of having a little amplified the detail. The termination is abrupt, and necessarily so, as I must candidly confess a want of imagination to fulfil the expectations which may have been excited by the early part of the tale.

Utterson added an epigraph to the start of each of the stories in Tales of the Dead, in the tradition of Ann Radcliffe and M. G. Lewis. For "The Storm", Utterson used a quote from Mark Akenside's The Pleasures of the Imagination (1744):

——"Of shapes that walk
At dead of night, and clank their chains, and wave
The torch of hell around the murderer's bed."

== Plot ==
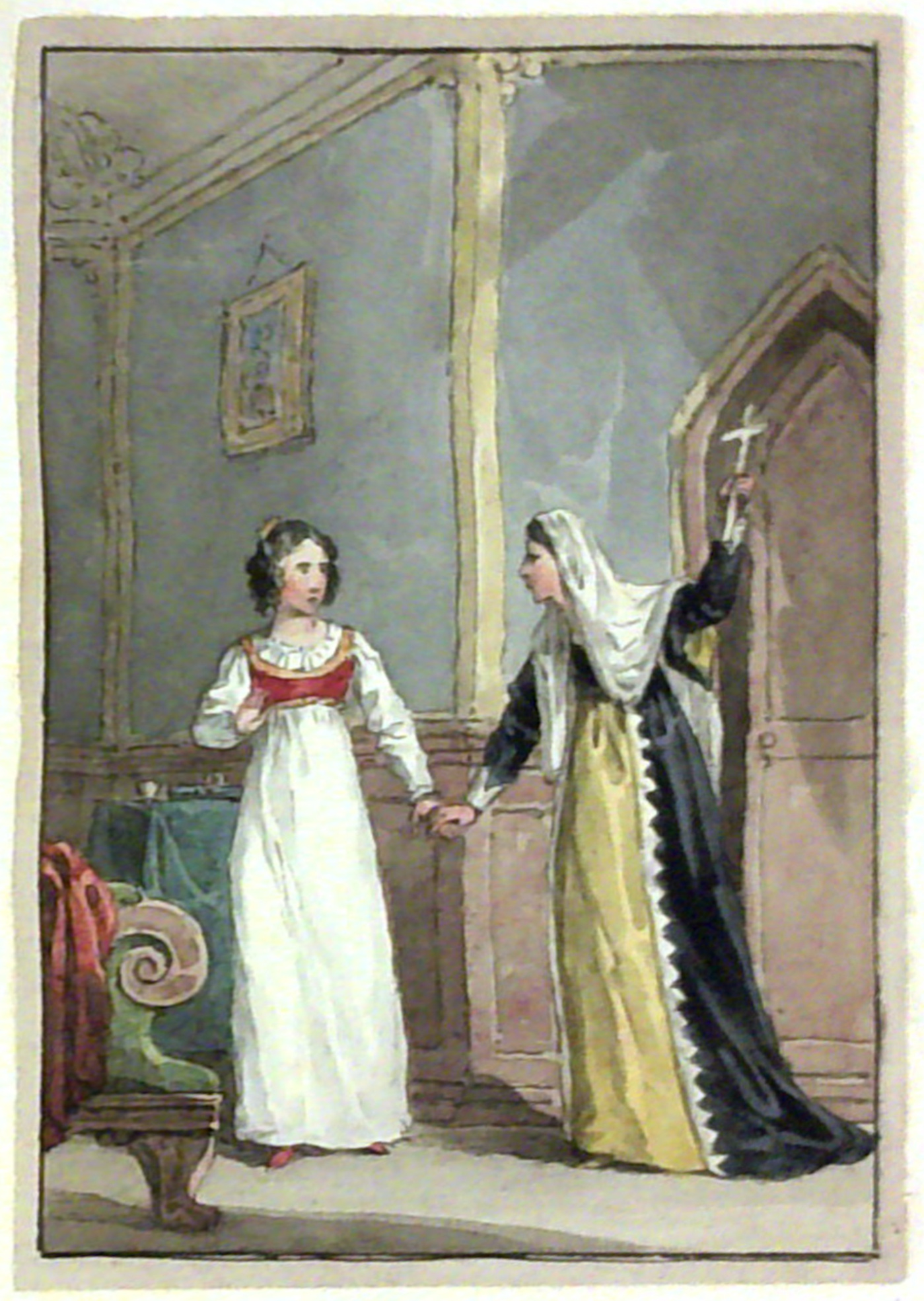
Unpublished illustration of "The Storm" by Edward Vernon Utterson

A wedding party in eighteenth-century Gascony is held at the château of the bridegroom's uncle. Many people from the surrounding area are invited, including some strangers. The host's daughter Emily befriends one of these, Isabella de Nunez, the widow of a Spanish officer of the Walloon Guards who had recently arrived in Gascony. An extremely heavy thunderstorm arrives, preventing the guests from leaving until the morning. The prospect of this terrifies Isabella, but Emily insists Isabella shares her room. Isabella reluctantly agrees, locks the door, and gets Emily to swear not to tell anyone what is about to happen until after she is dead. As the clock strikes midnight, a carriage is heard arriving despite the storm, followed by footsteps approaching the room, and the locked door opens. Emily soon faints, unable to bear whatever it is that she sees. Isabella leaves early the next morning, but Emily is found unconscious, and is revived by a doctor only to fall seriously ill. She recounts the contents of this story but not Isabella's secret, and dies after only a few days. Isabella also dies soon after, having "expired under circumstances of unexampled horror".

== Reception ==
Francis Palgrave, reviewing Tales of the Dead in the Quarterly Review (1820), focused on "The Storm" saying that it is "so well told, that we hope the fair writer will employ her leisure on the achievements of our own country ghosts instead of presenting us with alien spectres." William Carew Hazlitt referred to "The Storm" as "a clever fragment in that interesting little volume 'Tales of the Dead.'" Brian Stableford remarked in his review of Tales of the Dead that "The Storm"'s heroine "coyly and infuriatingly refuses to reveal exactly what she saw in the haunted chamber". Fabio Camilletti mentioned the addition of "The Storm" as being part of Utterson's act of cultural appropriation of Fantasmagoriana into the boundaries of the British Gothic tradition. Maximiliaan van Woudenberg noted the parallels between Utterson's creation of this story with the Byron–Shelley ghost story contest, and also with Friedrich Laun's admission that he adapted a friend's story for the plot of "Der Geist des Verstorbenen" ("Le Revenant" in Fantasmagoriana).

"The Storm" was reprinted a number of times, including in Horace Welby's Signs before Death, and Authenticated Apparitions (1825) as "The Midnight Storm (From the French)", William Charlton Wright's The Astrologer of the Nineteenth Century (1825) as "The Midnight Storm (A True Relation, from the French)", Ambrose Marten's The Stanley Tales, Original and Select (1827), The Annual Pearl: Or, Gift of Friendship (1840s), and L. W. de Laurence's The Old Book of Magic (1918) as "The Midnight Storm". The "Midnight Storm" reprints are slightly modified from the original text, with the date mentioned at the start of the story changed from "12th of June 17—" to "12th of June, ——", and de Laurence's version editing the first line of the epigraph to read "Of Evil Spirits that walk".
