= List of diplomats of Great Britain to the Republic of Genoa =

List of diplomats from the Kingdom of England and Great Britain to the Republic of Genoa

== Envoys Extraordinary of England (to 1707) ==
- 1697–1698 and 1702–1705: Sir Lambert Blackwell
- 1705: Col. Mitford Crowe Resident
- 1706–1707: Dr Henry Newton (usually absent)

== Envoys Extraordinary of Great Britain (from 1707) ==
- 1707–1711: Dr Henry Newton (usually absent)
- 1708–1713: William Richard Chetwynd Resident 1708–1711; then Envoy Extraordinary
  - 1710: John Molesworth Envoy Extraordinary
- 1714–1722: Henry Davenant

No formal representation 1722–1763, other than Consuls

- c.1723–1738: John Bagshaw Consul
- c.1738–c.1756: John Birtles Consul
- c.1758–1775: James Hollford Consul

Ministers

- 1763: Capt Augustus Harvey Minister
- 1763–1766: Commodore Thomas Harrison Minister
- 1767–1769: Commodore Richard Spey Minister

No formal diplomatic representation 1769–1793, other than Consuls

- 1786 to 1786: John Collet, Consul

Minister Plenipoteniary

- 1793–1795: Francis Drake Minister Plenipotentiary
  - 1786–1797: Joseph Brame, Consul, 1795–1797 in charge
  - 1797–1803: James Bird, Vice-consul, Acting Consul

== British Representatives to Genoa since 1797 ==
Great Britain became the United Kingdom of Great Britain and Ireland in 1801; the city and republic of Genoa also transferred through several changes of national status during the 19th century.

=== France 1797 to 1814 ===
In 1797, the Republic passed into French control as the Ligurian Republic, and was formally annexed to France in 1805 as the département of Gênes.

=== Kingdom of Sardinia 1814 to 1861 ===
At the 1814 Congress of Vienna, Genoa became part of the Kingdom of Sardinia. Britain continued to appoint Consuls to the city.

- 1840–1857: Timothy Yeats Brown Consul-General
- 1856: Edward Algernoon Le Mesurier, Consul-general; Montague Yeats-Brown Vice-Consul
- 1858–1893: Montague Yeats-Brown Consul

=== Kingdom of Italy, 1861 ===
The Kingdom of Sardinia became the core of the Kingdom of Italy in 1861.

- 1893: Charles Alfred Payton, Consul
- 1908: William Keene MVO, Consul
- 1918: Edward C Blech CMG, Consul-General
- 1920: William H.M. Sinclair, Consul; James R Murray Vice-Consul
- 1922: Harry Churchill CMG, Consul-General
- 1925: Robert Erskine Consul-General, C. F. W. Andrews Vice-Consul
- 1930: Edward William Paget Thurstan, CMG Consul-General; I. L. Henderson Vice-Consul
- 1935: A. G. Major Consul-General; W. J. Sullivan Vice-Consul
- 1940: W. S. Edmonds CMG, OBE Consul-General; Donald CameronVice-Consul

=== Italian Republic, 1946 ===
Consuls were appointed to Genoa from 1950 until 1995; since when all consuls have been honorary.
