= Francis Drake (diplomat) =

British diplomat

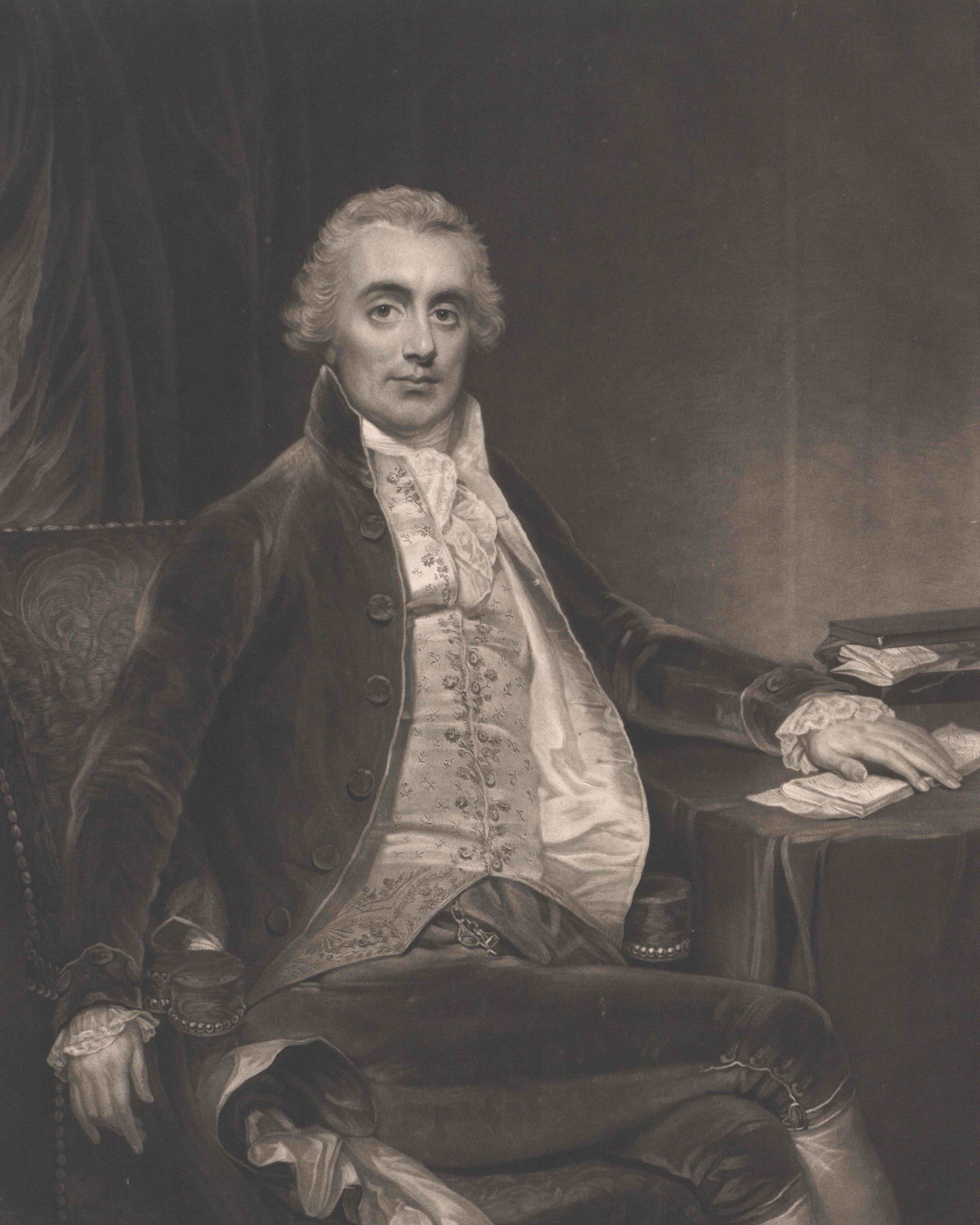
Portrait of Drake

Francis Drake (22 April 1764 – January 1821) was a British diplomat who held positions at Genoa and Munich during the French Revolutionary and Napoleonic Wars. Drake was the son of Rev. Francis Drake, Vicar of Seaton and Beer. In 1790 Drake was appointed Secretary of Legation to the Court of Copenhagen, moving on to be Minister Resident at Venice before becoming envoy to Genoa in 1793.

Drake took leave to return from Genoa to England to marry in 1795. In 1799 he was appointed Envoy Extraordinary to the Elector Palatine, and Minister to the Diet of Ratisbon. He kept up correspondence with French informants, and in 1804 was politically embarrassed when some his letters were intercepted by the French government and circulated to foreign ministers in Paris, thereby revealing the plans of Charles Pichegru and Georges Cadoudal to mount an uprising on the left bank of the Rhine.

Diplomatic posts
Preceded by William Lindsay	British Minister at Venice; 1793	Unknown
Unknown	British Resident at Genoa; 1793–1795	Unknown
Preceded by Arthur Paget (diplomat)	British envoy to Elector Palatinate; 1799–1805	Unknown
