= Timothy Yeats Brown =

English banker and consul to Genoa (1789–1858)

Timothy Yeats Brown (14 July 1789 – 3 February 1858) was an English banker and head of his family firm Brown, Cobb & Co. He became the British consul to Genoa from 1840 to 1857.

== Life ==
Born on 14 July 1789, the youngest and only surviving son of successful brewer and banker Timothy Brown and his second wife Sarah Huxham (née Lowndes). He had an older half-sister Frances Elizabeth Brown, and three older sisters Sarah Elizabeth, Harriet, and Maria.

His father apprenticed him to Whitbread in 1803, in which he had acquired a one-third stake four years earlier.

In 1812 Yeats Brown married Mary Ann (or Anna Maria) Goldsmid, a Jewish convert to Anglicanism, and eldest daughter of prominent bill broker Benjamin Goldsmid. Evelyn Wrench wrote that Yeats Brown "was always amused by the banter of his friends who observed that he might very easily have had a Jewish grandmother". In 1814 he met Swiss metallurgist Johann Conrad Fischer, who was visiting England to see how iron and steel were manufactured there, and Yeats Brown showed him the "treasures of his valuable library". Mary Ann died in 1817, aged 27 and without issue, at Torno near Lake Como.

Yeats Brown lived at Manchester Square in Marylebone, and entertained many Italian liberals in London, which Wrench states probably later drew him to Italy. This included arranging for Federico Confalonieri to become a Freemason in 1818 in Cambridge. He got to know Ugo Foscolo, and when Yeats Brown left for the continent in the spring of 1821, Foscolo provided him with introductions to people in Switzerland and Italy, including Velo de Sette Comuni when he was about to visit Vicenza that year. In March 1821 he was in Milan when the Austrian police were arresting everyone suspected of plotting against the government. He saved Luigi Porro Lambertenghi by driving out of the city with Porro disguised as his footman. They returned to England in early 1822, where Yeats Brown vouched for Porro at the Alien Office.

Eleven years after the death of his first wife, he married Stuarta Erskine, daughter of David Erskine, 2nd Baron Erskine at the British Legation in Munich. Erskine was unable to give his daughter any financial help, with the dowry taking the form of two half crowns, which were later passed down in the family as mementos. Between 1832 and 1840 the couple lived on the Island of Palmaria in an old house built in 1504, the only large house on the island, where his son Montague "Monty" Yeats-Brown was born in 1834. The young family spent the winter on Palmaria, and the summer with Stuarta's father at his residence at the Bavarian lakes.

In 1840 Yeats Brown moved to Genoa to become British consul, taking up the post on 4 August of that year. Charles Dickens befriended Yeats Brown when he visited Genoa in 1845, performing a reading of A Christmas Carol to a select circle invited to meet him at the consulate; that reading is thought to have been Dickens' first outside his own home. Yeats Brown is said by Marrache to have played a significant part in the unification of Italy, and remained in post until 1857. He died on 3 February 1858, and was succeeded as consul to Genoa by his son Montague Yeats-Brown.

== See also ==
- List of diplomats of Great Britain to the Republic of Genoa
