= Montague Yeats-Brown =

British diplomat (1834–1921)

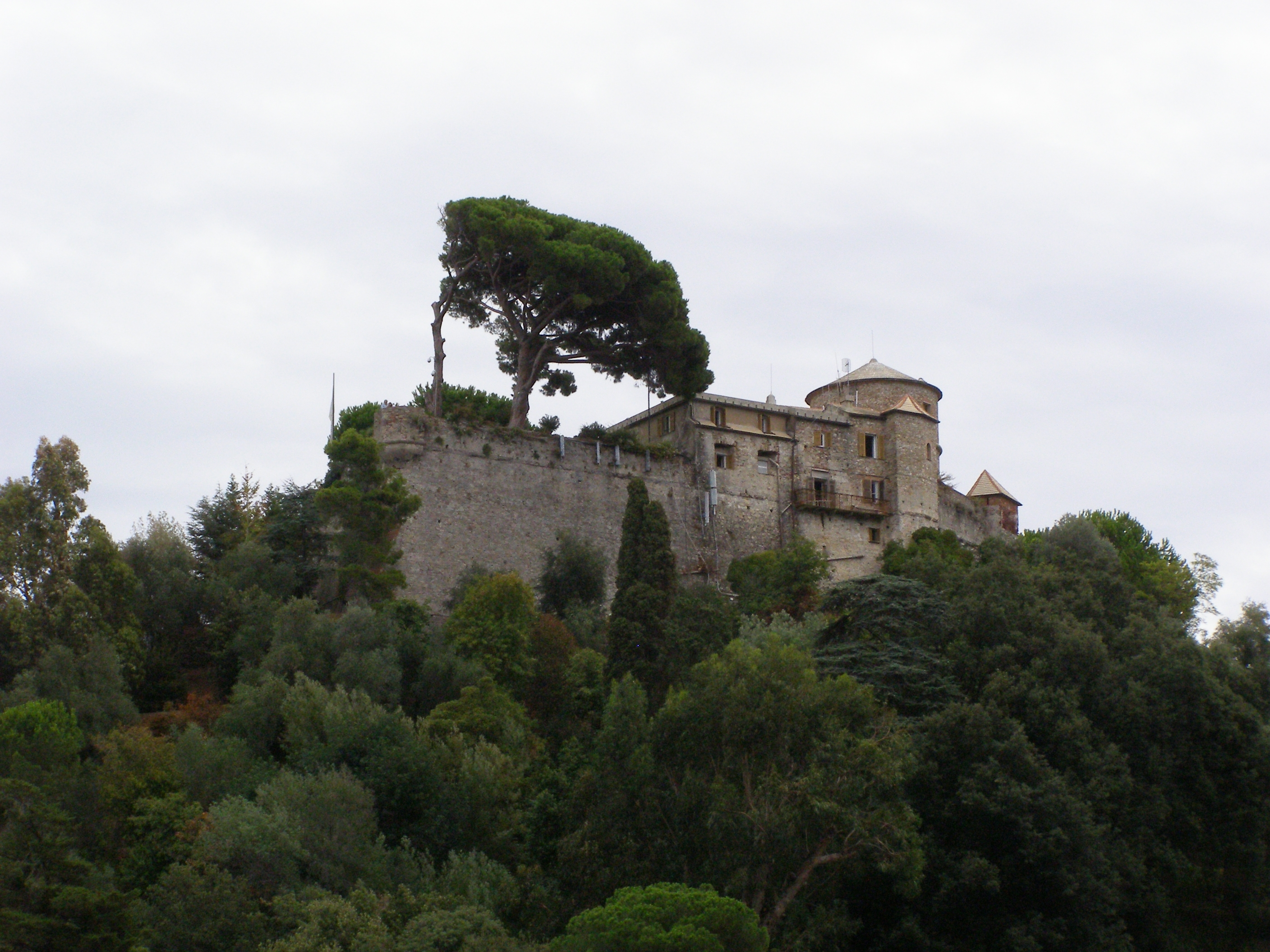
Castello Brown, Portofino

Montague "Monty" Yeats-Brown CMG (2 August 1834 – 22 February 1921) was a 19th-century British diplomat in Genoa and Boston.

== Life ==
Yeats-Brown was born on 2 August 1834 on Palmaria, and was christened on an American warship then in harbour at the island. He grew up speaking Genoese, Italian, German and English.

His father, Timothy Yeats Brown, from an English banking family, became Consul of Genoa in 1840; his maternal grandfather John Cadwalader was a militia general in the American Revolution. "Monty" was sent to a German school in Brussels at the age of 10, before passing into Marlborough College.

He served in Genoa, Kingdom of Sardinia and then in Boston.

Yeats-Brown began working in the British Consulate in Genoa in 1854 aged 20, was appointed Vice-Consul two years later, and then Consul after his father's retirement in 1857, "though only then 23, which is unusually young for such a post". He married Agnes Matilda Bellingham, sister of Sir Henry Bellingham, 4th Baronet, on 3 November 1875. Yeats-Brown was appointed as consul to Boston in 1893, retiring from the diplomatic service in 1896.

In 1867, Yeats-Brown purchased Castello Brown above Portofino, which he restored over subsequent years, and where he died on 22 February 1921.

One of his sons, Francis Yeats-Brown, became well known for his dashing autobiography The Lives of a Bengal Lancer.

== See also ==
List of diplomats of Great Britain to the Republic of Genoa
