= Timothy Brown (radical) =

English banker, merchant and radical (1743/1744 – 1820)

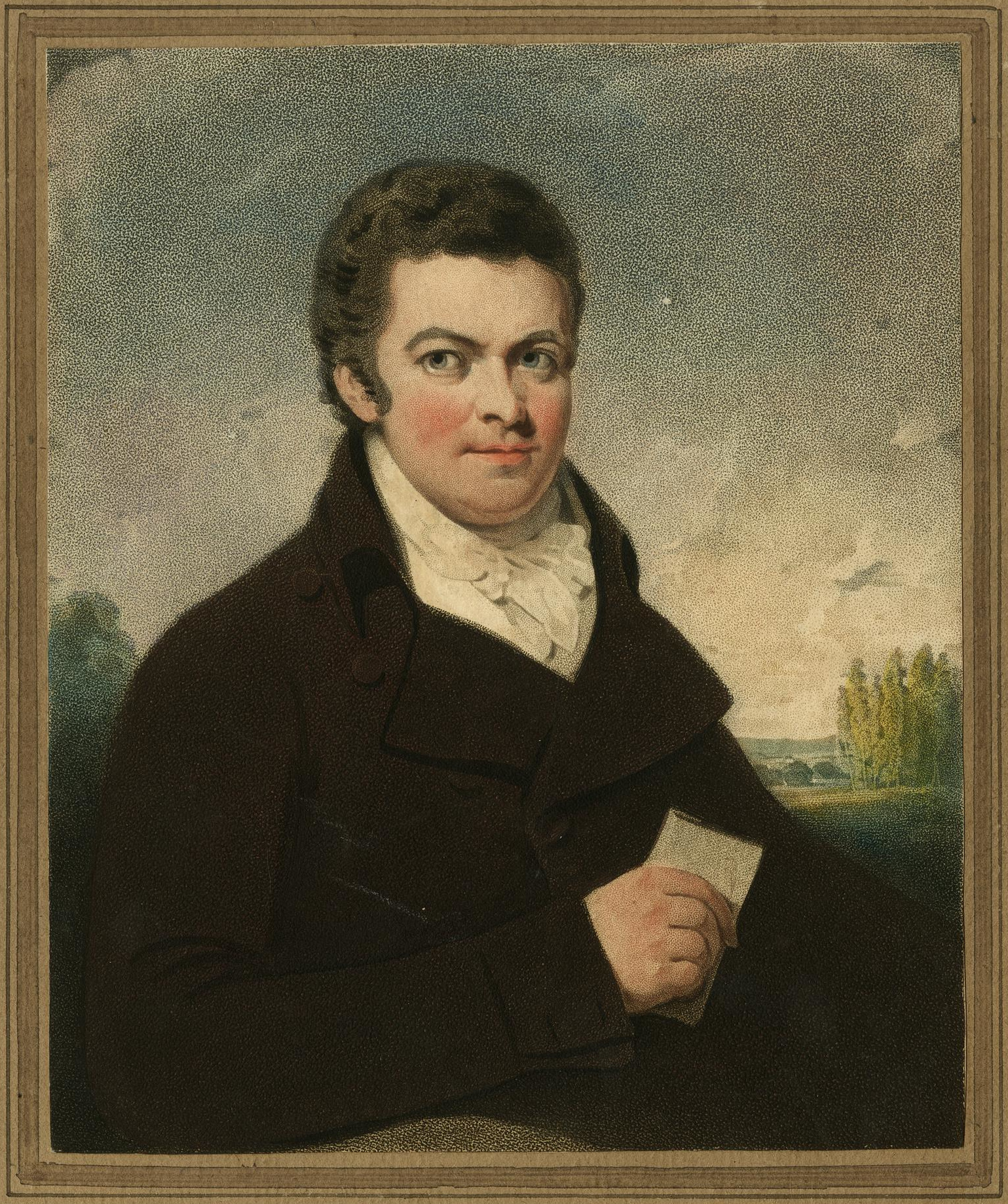
- Stipple print by Nathan Cooper Branwhite after a c. 1771 portrait by Samuel Medley
- Born: 1743 or 1744 (Note: Most sources state that Brown's year of birth is uncertain, though Marrache asserts that he was born in 1744.); Kirkoswald, Cumbria
- Died: 4 September 1820 (aged 76); Peckham Lodge
- Other names: "Equality Brown"
- Occupation: Banker
- Movement: Radicalism

Timothy Brown (1743/1744 – 4 September 1820) was an English banker, merchant and radical, known for his association with other radicals of the time, such as John Horne Tooke, Robert Waithman, William Frend, William Cobbett, John Cartwright and George Cannon; his political views gave him the nickname "Equality Brown". He was also one of the early partners of Whitbread, and became the master of the Worshipful Company of Brewers.

== Life ==
Born in 1743 or 1744 in Kirkoswald, Cumbria, the son of Ann née Yates and Isaac Brown (1704–1780). Brown's family were said to have been "good Cumberland yeoman stock", and had lived around Kirkoswald for many generations. The first recorded were cavalry guards hired by Lord Dacre to protect the border from the Scots; another, William Brown of Scales, fought as a soldier for Oliver Cromwell in the Civil War (1642–1651).

Brown grew up with at least two brothers (Samuel, 1749–1823, and Joseph, 1751–1824) in his family's modest farmstead Scales Rigg, above Kirkoswald, which had been built in 1734. Aged 16, he left Cumbria for London, either with or soon after his cousin Joseph Brown.

1832 engraving by Frederick Christian Lewis after Nathan Cooper Branwhite.

Brown retired in affluence to Peckham Lodge, where it was said that his "neighbours reported with awe that he could cut 400 pineapples from his own glasshouses". He died on 4 September 1820, and was buried in the graveyard of St Giles' Church, Camberwell.

== Children ==
- With Anne née Strutt (married 1761)
  - George Edward Brown (baptised 1762)
  - Frederick Wall Brown (baptised 1763)
- With Alice Lloyd
  - Frances Elizabeth 'Fanny' Brown (born 1774)
- With Sarah née Lowndes (married 1779)
  - Sarah Elizabeth Brown (1781–1851)
  - Timothy Brown (1783–1784)
  - Harriet Brown (born 1786)
  - Maria Brown (born 1787)
  - Timothy Yeats Brown (1789–1858)
  - Charlotte Brown (born 1791)
