= Henry Newton (diplomat) =

British judge and diplomat

Sir Henry Newton (1651–1715) was a British judge and diplomat. He was the eldest son of Henry Newton of Highley and his wife Mary Hunt. He was educated at St. Mary Hall, where he took the degrees of M.A. and B.C.L., and Merton, where he graduated as a Doctor of Civil Law. During the reign of Queen Anne, he was sent to Italy as the Envoy Extraordinary to the Grand Duke of Tuscany and Republic of Genoa, remaining there for nearly seven years. During his stay, he commissioned a medal by the Italian artist Massimiliano Soldani Benzi. After his return, he was made a judge of the admiralty court and master of St Katharine's by the Tower. He was knighted in 1715, but died later the same year.

Henry Newton had two daughters. One daughter, Mary, married Henry Rodney, and was the mother of George Brydges Rodney, later raised to the peerage as Baron Rodney. The other daughter, Catherine, married first a Colonel Alexander, and secondly Lord Aubrey Beauclerk.
