= Sarah Elizabeth Utterson =

British translator and author (1781–1851)

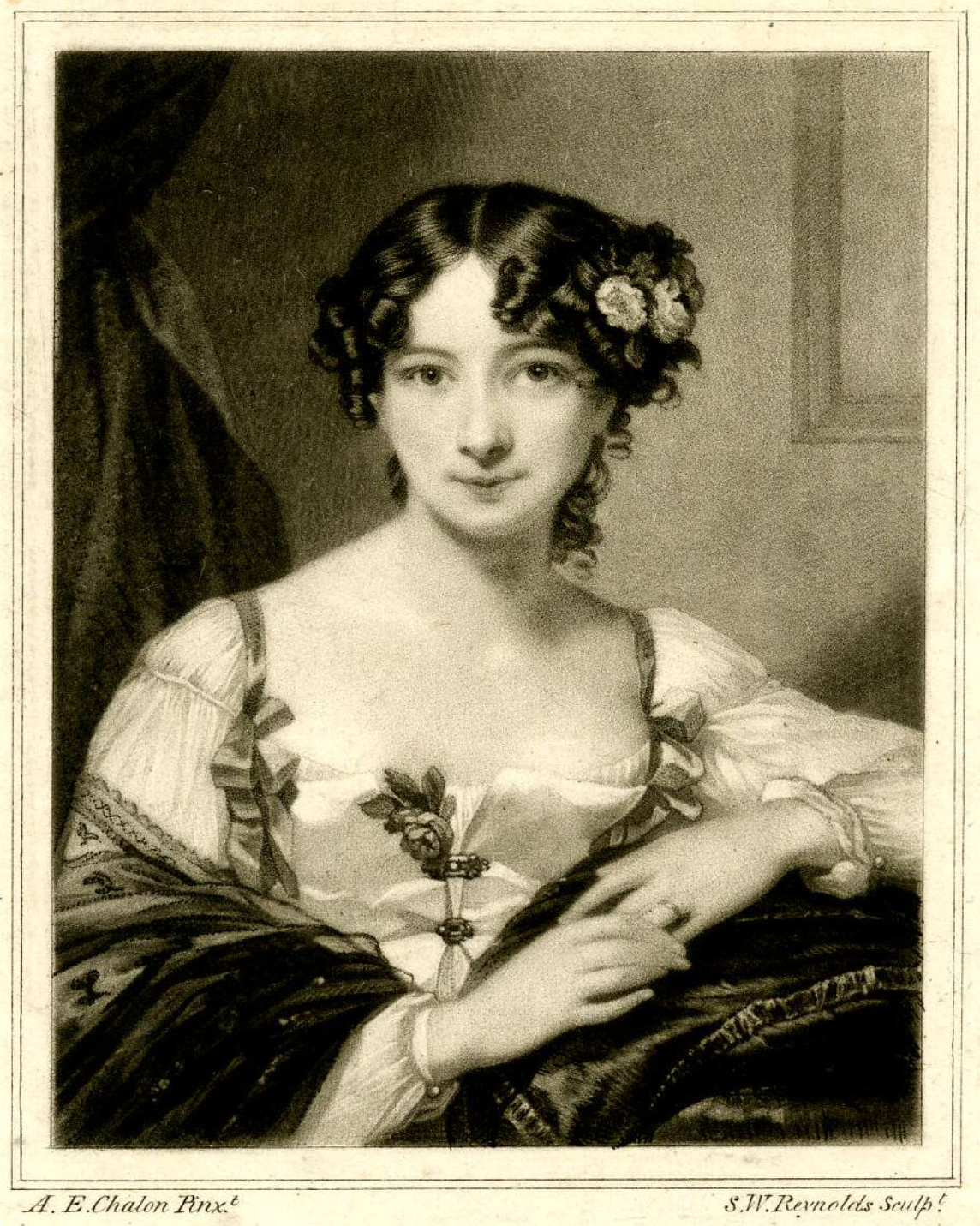
- Mezzotint by Samuel William Reynolds after a portrait by Alfred Edward Chalon painted around 1803–1807
- Born: Sarah Elizabeth Brown; 3 November 1781; St Mary-at-Hill, Middlesex, England
- Died: 22 September 1851 (aged 69); Brighton, Sussex, England
- Spouse: Edward Vernon Utterson (m. 1803)
- Parent: Timothy Brown
- Relatives: Timothy Yeats Brown (brother)
- Writing career
- Years active: 1813
- Notable work: Tales of the Dead

Signature
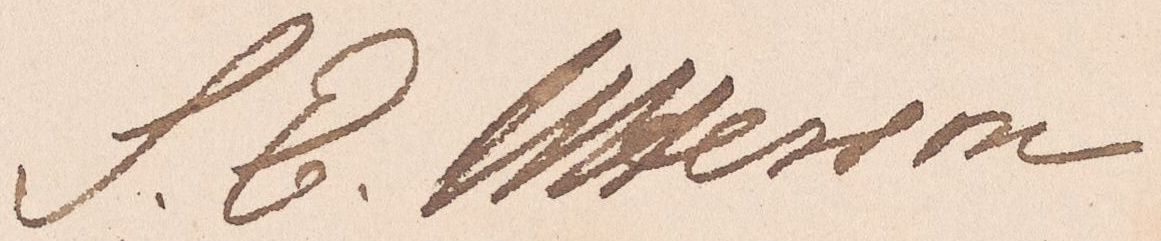

Sarah Elizabeth Utterson, née Brown (3 November 1781 – 22 September 1851), was a British translator and author. She anonymously translated most of Fantasmagoriana (1812) as Tales of the Dead (1813), which also included her own short story "The Storm".

== Life ==
Sarah Elizabeth Brown was born on 3 November 1781 in St Mary-at-Hill, Middlesex, London to Sarah and Timothy Brown. She married Edward Vernon Utterson on 2 May 1803. Writing in 1938, A. T. Utterson described her as "charming" and "mouse-like", and commented that "the marriage was completely successful". Though the Oxford Dictionary of National Biography states she and her husband had several children together, Abraham Marrache writes that the couple "had no descent", while A. T. Utterson says that they had "a rather mysterious daughter, believed to have been adopted, but about whom nothing is certainly known". (Note: A. T. Utterson continues "... about whom nothing is certainly known except that she once sent her compliments to Mrs. Bliss", in reference to Edward Vernon Utterson's letter to Philip Bliss dated 26 August 1814, which ends by saying "Mrs. U[tterson] unites in comp[limen]ts with My daughter".) They lived at 1 Elm Court, Temple, and 19 Great Ormond Street around 1805 and 1806, and moved to 32 Great Coram Street, Brunswick Square, London by 1808.

Utterson translated five of the eight stories of Fantasmagoriana (1812) – a French collection of German ghost stories. These were published as Tales of the Dead (1813), which also included her own short story "The Storm". The book was published anonymously, but by 1820 Utterson was known to be the translator. Her introduction to Tales of the Dead mentions "a female friend of very deserved literary celebrity", and she wrote letters to her friend the author Jane Porter and perhaps her sister Anna Maria Porter as well.

She and her husband lived at 11 South Audley Street from 1820–25, and then at 32 York Terrace, Regent's Park by 1829. Around 1835 they moved to the Isle of Wight, living first at Newport, and then moving to Ryde, where they lived at Buckland Grange (which before their time was a farm called Ryde House), before building Beldornie Tower, Pelham Field in 1840. At the time of the 1841 Census, they had five servants living there.

When Edward Dawes was elected Member of Parliament for the Isle of Wight in May 1851 on the principles of free trade, it was said that her husband "took such umbrage that he removed from Ryde", though they had been registered as living at 16 Suffolk Street, St Martins in the Fields, London, during the 1851 Census, held two months before.

She died on 22 September 1851 in Brighton, Sussex.

== Works ==
- Tales of the Dead (1813) as translator
  - "The Storm" (1813) as author
