= Jimmy Utterson =

English footballer (1914–1935)

Personal information
- Full name: James Utterson
- Date of birth: 26 November 1914
- Place of birth: Gateshead, England
- Date of death: 6 December 1935
- Place of death: Wolverhampton, England
- Height: 6 ft 1 in (1.85 m)
- Position: Goalkeeper

Senior career*
Years	Team	Apps	(Gls)
1933–1934	Glenavon		
1934–1935	Wolverhampton Wanderers	12	(0)
Total		12	(0)
- * Club domestic league appearances and goals

James Utterson (26 November 1914 – 6 December 1935) was an English footballer who played as goalkeeper in the Football League for Wolverhampton Wanderers.

Utterson was playing in a local junior football team Gateshead Celtic when he was recruited for the Northern Ireland club Glenavon, with whom he played a single season, distinguishing himself in matches against the English Football League and the Scottish League. This led to his acquisition, for a reported £500 transfer fee, by Wolves manager Frank Buckley.

He was into his second season with Wolves when he died of heart failure in December 1935 aged 21. He was buried at Merridale Cemetery, Wolverhampton. The later discovery of his gravestone in a dilapidated state led to an appeal to fund its restoration in 2022.
