= Edward Vernon Utterson =

British lawyer, literary antiquary, collector and editor (1775/1776–1856)

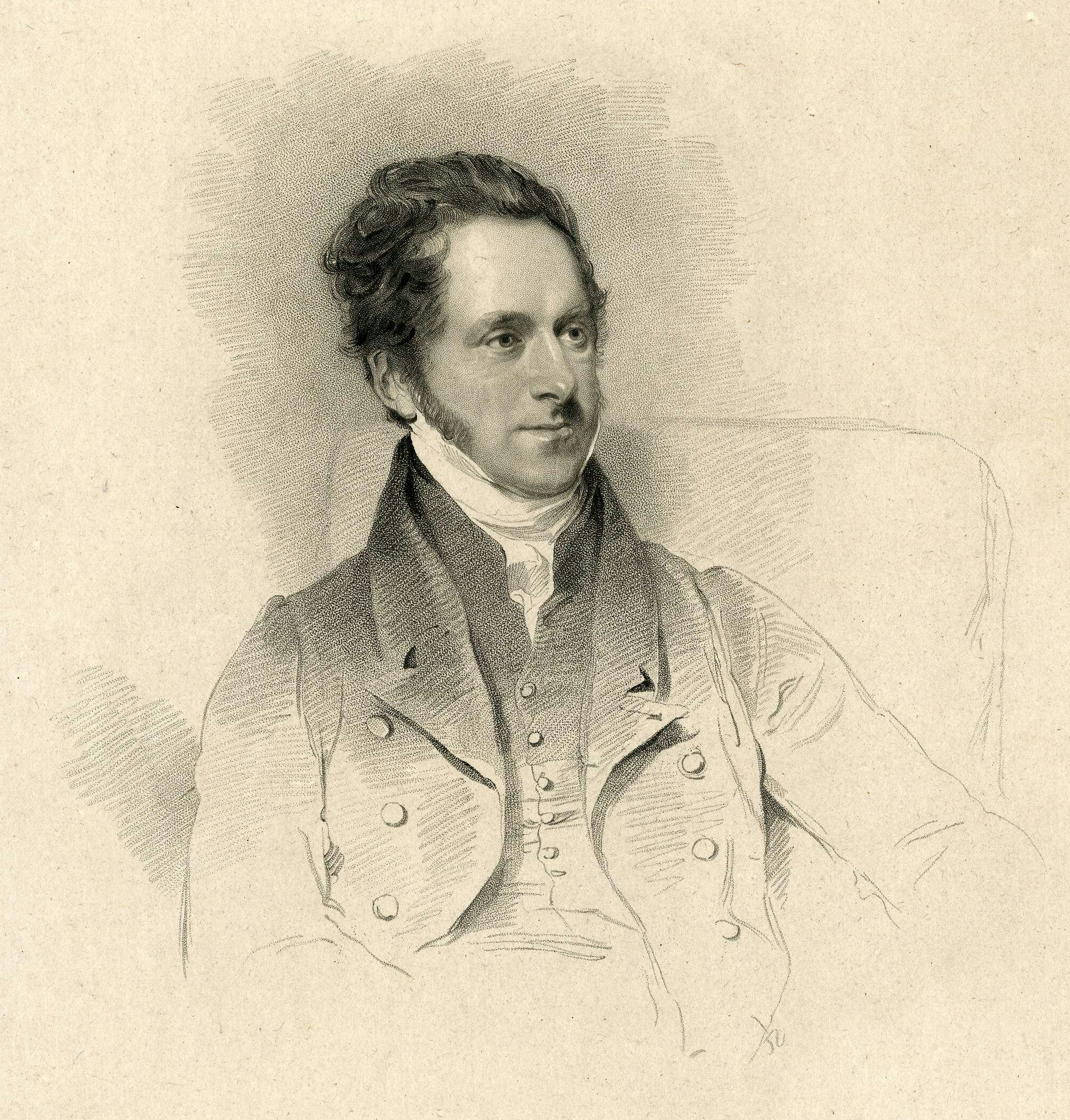
- Born: 1775/1776
- Died: 14 July 1856 (aged 80); Upper Brunswick Place, Hove, Brighton
- Resting place: Fareham, Hampshire
- Education: Bachelor of Laws
- Alma mater: Trinity College, Cambridge
- Occupations: Lawyer, Literary antiquary, collector, editor
- Spouse: Sarah Elizabeth Utterson (1803–1851)
- Writing career
- Language: English
- Period: 1812–1843

Edward Vernon Utterson FSA FRSA (1775/1776 – 14 July 1856) was a British lawyer, literary antiquary, collector and editor. He was a fellow of the Society of Antiquaries, one of the original members of the Roxburghe Club, a member of the Athenaeum Club, Camden Society and Royal Society of Arts, Recorder of Chichester and a Trustee of the Royal Victoria Yacht Club. He went on to become one of the Six Clerks in Chancery, a position which he kept until his retirement on the abolition of the post in 1842, and also founded the Beldornie Press.

== Biography ==
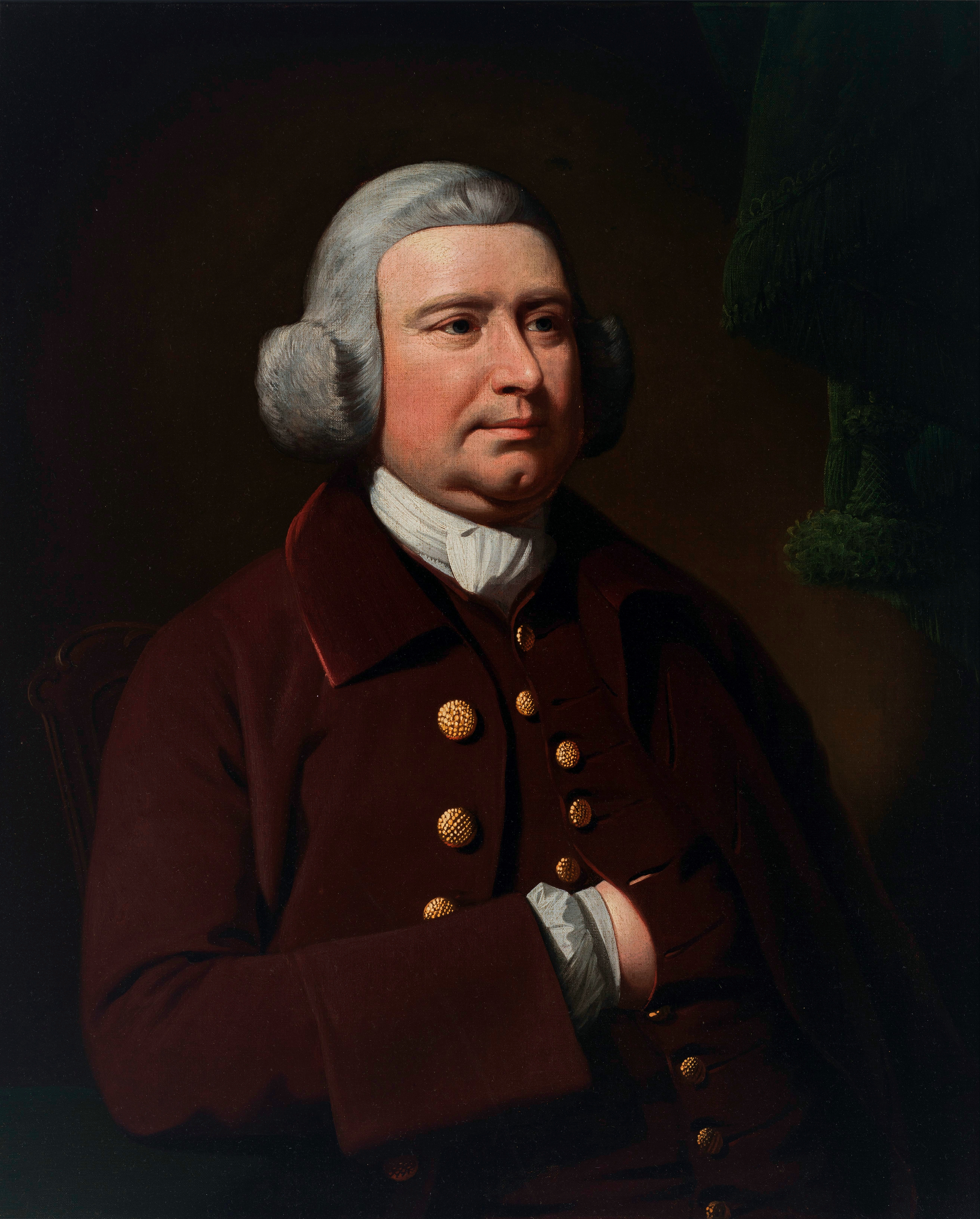
Utterson's father, John Utterson, by Benjamin West in 1769

Born in 1775 or 1776 as the first of John Utterson of Fareham, Hampshire (who was the secretary of Sir Edward Vernon) and his wife Elizabeth's (née Elizabeth Rowe) eight children, he was baptised on 14 July 1777 at Holy Trinity Church, Gosport. He was educated at Eton College, entered Trinity College, Cambridge on 17 February 1794, and Lincoln's Inn on 31 October 1794. Utterson matriculated from Trinity College in Michaelmas term 1797 and was admitted pensioner on 17 February 1798, graduating Bachelor of Laws in 1801, and being called to the bar as a barrister on 1 February 1802.

He married Sarah Elizabeth Brown (1781–1851) on 2 May 1803. Though the Oxford Dictionary of National Biography states they had several children together, Abraham Marrache writes that the couple "had no descent", while A. T. Utterson says that they had "a rather mysterious daughter, believed to have been adopted, but about whom nothing is certainly known". (Note: A. T. Utterson continues "... about whom nothing is certainly known except that she once sent her compliments to Mrs. Bliss", in reference to Edward Vernon Utterson's letter to Philip Bliss dated 26 August 1814, which ends by saying "Mrs. U[tterson] unites in comp[limen]ts with My daughter".) Utterson practised in the Court of Chancery and was appointed to be one of the Six Clerks in Chancery in 1815, which post he retained until it was abolished in 1842, whereupon he retired, retaining his full salary. He was appointed Recorder of Chichester in 1817, where his father had been portreeve, and he had been made customer for £12 1s in 1800; he appointed William Johnson of Chichester as his deputy, and continued in the post until he resigned in 1820, at which time the council made a resolution that "At this Assembly this Body entertain a Deep Sense of the Ability, Zeal and impartiality with which Edward Vernon Utterson Esquire has discharged his important Duties as Recorder ... and they feel the most unfeigned regret that Circumstances have compelled him to Resign ..."

Politically, he was "an uncompromising Tory of the old school, and a most implacable enemy of the system of 'retrenchment' which followed in the wake of the passing of the Reform Bill". Utterson lived at 1 Elm Court, Temple, and 19 Great Ormond Street while a member of the Royal Society of Arts from 1805 to 1806, then 32 Great Coram Street, Brunswick Square, London by 1808, 11 South Audley Street from 1820 to 1825, and 32 York Terrace, Regent's Park by 1829, but from about 1835 he resided first at Newport, Isle of Wight, before moving to Ryde, living first at Buckland Grange (which before his time was a farm called Ryde House; this name was transferred to a new house built nearer the sea by George Player), and then building Beldornie Tower, Pelham Field, where he set up the Beldornie Press in 1840. When Edward Dawes was elected Member of Parliament for the Isle of Wight in May 1851 on the principles of free trade, Utterson "took such umbrage that he removed from Ryde", though he and his wife had been registered as living at 16 Suffolk Street, St Martins in the Fields, London, during the 1851 Census, held two months before.

His wife died on 22 September 1851, and after this he held the first sale of his library, from 19 to 27 April 1852. Utterson himself died aged 80 on 14 July 1856 at Upper Brunswick Place, Hove, Brighton, and was buried at Fareham. There are memorial tablets in St Thomas's Church, Ryde, to him and his wife.

== Leisure ==
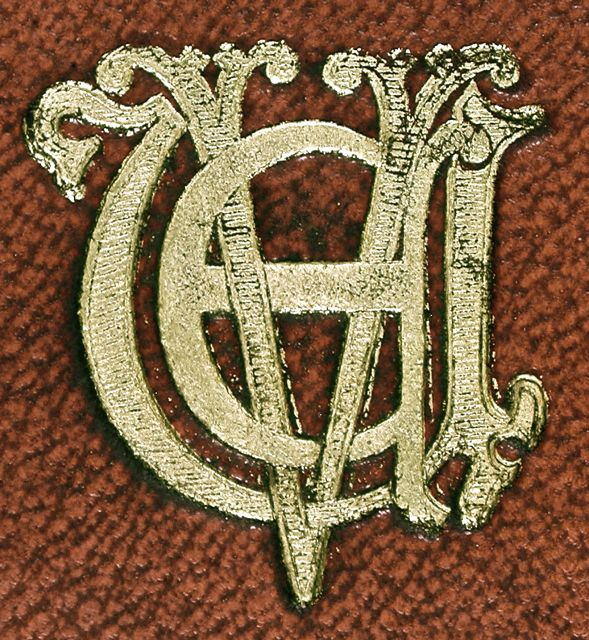
Utterson's "EVU" bookbinding monogram

=== Collector ===
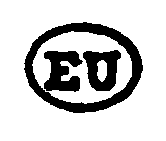
Utterson's collector's mark

Like his father, Utterson was a collector of books, drawings and prints, and has been described as "a book-collector of real importance and high rank. He had taste, knowledge and experience." It is believed that he must have started his collection early in the 19th century, and he was elected a fellow of the Society of Antiquaries in 1807. He was one of the eighteen members who founded the Roxburghe Club at dinner at the St. Albans Tavern, St Albans Street, London, on 17 June 1812, which he remained a member of until his death in 1856.

He edited a number of books from 1812 to 1839, and then founded his own press, Beldornie Press, publishing a number of notable reprints from 1840 to 1843. These books were printed in very limited numbers, of no more than about twelve to twenty, each copy numbered in print or handwriting. Utterson presented a copy of all of these to John Payne Collier on discovering the interest he had in early English literature. Collier discovered a number of inconsistencies in the books, which he attributed primarily to the scribes and compositors employed by Utterson for Beldornie Press, and published a note to that effect in the 5 January 1856 issue of Notes and Queries, assuming Utterson to be dead. Utterson quickly wrote to him in person, informing him that he was alive and well, and Collier wrote a second note in the next issue, apologising for the confusion. His warning over the accuracy of the Beldornie Press reprints, however, still stands.

=== Artist ===
Utterson was also a talented amateur artist, and many of his works remain in the British Museum to this day. He was admitted to draw from the British Museum's Townley Gallery in 1817, which had been opened to allow artists to draw from its ancient sculptures, and met artist James Ward there that year. When he exhibited his work in 1824, he was described as "an imitator as well as an admirer of the compositions of Mr Stothard".

=== Yachtsman ===
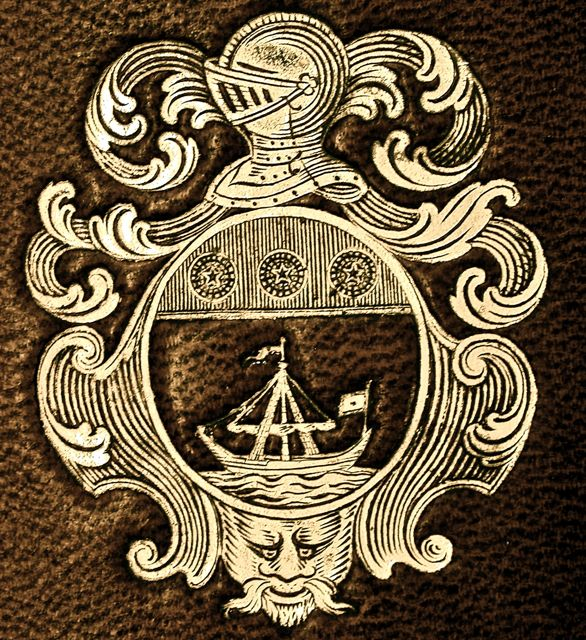
Utterson's coat of arms as an armorial bookbinding

Utterson owned the yacht Iris of Ryde, and was elected a member of the English division of the Royal Western Yacht Squadron in Portsmouth on 27 October 1835. He was also made a Trustee of the Royal Victoria Yacht Club in Ryde, Isle of Wight.

== Sales ==
As a notable collector, sales of Utterson's books, prints and so on were well advertised events at the time. The first sale of his books ran for eight days from 19 to 27 April 1852, auctioned by S.L. Sotheby & J. Wilkinson, realising £4805, and was followed by the auction of his collection of drawings and engravings.

The second sale of his book collection ran for seven days, from 20 to 27 March 1857, eight months after his death, and amounted to £4050.

== Legacy ==
Literary historian Murray Pittock suggests that Utterson may have been the source of the name of the protagonist of Robert Louis Stevenson's Strange Case of Dr Jekyll and Mr Hyde (1886) – Gabriel John Utterson – a lawyer and close friend of Jekyll in the story.

== Bibliography ==
=== Works edited ===
- Virgilius. This Boke treateth of the Lyfe of Virgilius, and of his Deth, and many Marvayles that he did in hys Lyfetyme, by Whychcrafte and Nygromancy, thorough the helpe of the Devyls of Hell, London, 1812
- The Chronicles of Englande, Fraunce, Spayne, Portyngale, Scotlande, Bretayne, Flaunders & other Places adioynynge, London, 1812
- The History of the Valiant Knight Arthur of Little Britain. A Romance of Chivalry. Originally translated from the French by John Bourchier, Lord Berners, London, 1814
  - According to Thompson Cooper: "This superb edition is illustrated with a series of plates contained in a valuable manuscript of the original romance."
- Select Pieces of Early Popular Poetry: republished principally from early printed copies in the Black Letter, 2 vols, London, 1817
- Cheuelere Assigne, 1820
  - Volume 27 of the Roxburghe Club.
- A Little Book of Ballads, Newport, Isle of Wight, 1836
  - Dedicated and presented to the Roxburghe Club as volume 51.
- Kyng Roberd of Cysylle, London, 1839

=== Reprints at Beldornie Press ===
1840

- Arthur Newman, Pleasures Vision, 1619
- Samuel Rowlands, Knave of Harts, 1613

1841

- Samuel Rowlands, The Melancholie Knight, 1615
- Samuel Rowlands, Looke to it: for Ile Stabbe ye, 1604
- Richard Linche, Diella: Certaine Sonnets, 1596
- Samuel Rowlands, The Knave of Clubbs, 1611
- Samuel Rowlands, More Knaues yet? The Knaues of Spades and Diamonds, n.d.
- Samuel Rowlands, The Night Raven, 1620
- Samuel Rowlands, Good Newes and Bad Newes, 1622
- Richard Barnfield, Cynthia, 1593
- Patricke Hannay, Songs and Sonnets, 1622

1842

- Thomas Middleton, Microcynicon: Sixe Snarling Satyres, 1599
- John Maynard, The XII Wonders of the World, 1611
- Thomas Bastard, Chrestoleros. Seuen Bookes of Epigrames, 1598
- Zepheria, 1594

1843

- Certain Elegies done by Sundrie Excellent Wits, 1620
- Edward Guilpin, Skialetheia, or A Shadowe of Truth in certaine Epigrams and Satyres, 1599
