= Hartman =

Hartman is a name that occurs as a surname and a given name.

== Surname ==
Hartman is a surname of German origin. Notable people with the surname include:

=== A ===
- Angélica María Hartman (born 1944), American-born Mexican actress and singer
- Anton Hartman (1918–1982), South African conductor and music educator
- Arne Hartman (1940–2016), Finnish diplomat
- Arthur A. Hartman (1926–2015), American diplomat, ambassador to France and the Soviet Union
- Arthur Hartman (1881–1956), American violinist and composer

=== B ===
- Barend Hartman van Groningen (c. 1740 – 1806), Dutch Mennonite teacher and minister
- Billy Hartman (born 1957), Scottish actor
- Blanche Hartman (1926–2016), American Soto Zen teacher
- Bob Hartman (born 1949), American artist, singer/songwriter, & religious leader
- Brynn Hartman (1958–1998), American model & actress
- Butch Hartman (born 1965), American animator

=== C ===
- C. Bertram Hartman (1882–1960), American landscape painter
- Carl Johan Hartman (1790–1849), Swedish physician and botanist
- Carl Hartman (botanist) (1824–1885), Swedish botanist, son of Carl Johan
- Carl Vilhelm Hartman (1862–1941), Swedish botanist and anthropologist, son of Carl (1824–1885)
- Charles S. Hartman (1861–1929), U.S. Representative from Montana
- Christian Hartmann (politician) (born 1974), German politician

=== D ===
- Dan Hartman (1950–1994), American singer/songwriter
- David Hartman (1931–2013), American rabbi
- David Hartman (born 1935), American journalist, actor and media host
- Don Hartman (1900–1958), American screenwriter and director
- Donald Adam Hartman (1929–1996), Mayor of Calgary (1989)
- Donniel Hartman, Israeli rabbi and philosopher

=== E ===
- Edward Hartman (1964–2003), American convicted murderer
- Elek Hartman (1922–2002), American actor, known for "Homefront"
- Elizabeth Hartman (1943–1987), American actress
- Ellen Hartman (1860–1945), Swedish actress
- Ena Hartman (1932–2025), American actress

=== G ===
- Gabrissa Hartman (born 1975), Nauruan politician
- Geoffrey Hartman (1929–2016), German-born American deconstructionist literary critic
- George W. Hartman (1867–1954), American football coach
- Grace Hartman (1900–1998), first female mayor of Sudbury, Ontario
- Grace Hartman (1907–1955), American dancer and actress, wife of Paul Hartman
- Grace Hartman (1918–1993), Canadian labour union activist
- Greg Kroah-Hartman, computer scientist

=== J ===
- Jack Hartman (1925–1998), American basketball coach
- Jacobus Johannes Hartman (1851–1924), Dutch Latin philologist
- Jan Hartman (1887–1969), Dutch fascist and Nazi collaborator during World War II
- Jan Hartman (born 1967), Polish philosopher and bioethicist
- Jesse Lee Hartman (1853–1930), U.S. Representative from Pennsylvania
- Johnny Hartman (1923–1983), American jazz singer
- Józef Hartman (1898–1979), Polish Army officer

=== K ===
- Kenneth E. Hartman (born 1960), American writer, prison activist and convicted murderer
- Kevin Hartman (born 1974), American soccer player
- Kim Hartman (born 1955), English actress

=== L ===
- Lisa Hartman (born 1956), American actress and singer
- Louis O. Hartman (1876–1955), American Methodist minister

=== M ===
- Marea Hartman (1920–1994), British athletics sport administrator
- Marie Louise Hartman (born 1959), known professionally as Nina Hartley, American pornographic film actress and sex educator
- Mauno Hartman (1930–2017), Finnish sculptor
- Milka Hartman (1902–1997), Austrian-Slovenian poet
- Michael Steven Hartman, known as Mickey Hart (born 1943), American percussionist and musician from the Grateful Dead
- Mike Hartman (born 1967), American ice hockey player

=== O ===
- Olov Hartman (1906–1982), Swedish writer

=== P ===
- Paul Hartman (1904–1973), American dancer and actor, husband of Grace Hartman
- Paul Leon Hartman (1913–2005), American experimental physicist
- Peter G. Hartman (born 1947), English-German biochemist
- Peter Hartman (born 1949), Dutch executive, president of KLM from 2007 to 2013
- Phil Hartman (1948–1998), Canadian-born American actor, comedian, screenwriter, and graphic artist
- Philip Hartman (1915–2015), American mathematician, known a.o. for the Hartman–Grobman theorem
- Piet Hartman (1922–2021), Dutch crystallographer
- Piret Hartman (born 1981), Estonian politician

=== Q ===
- Quilindschy Hartman (born 2001), Dutch footballer

=== R ===
- Robert S. Hartman (1910–1973), German-born American logician and philosopher, né Robert Schirokauer
- Rosella Hartman (1895–1984), American painter, etcher and lithographer
- Ryan Hartman (born 1994), American ice hockey player
- Ryan Hartman (baseball) (born 1994), American baseball player

=== S ===
- Saidiya Hartman (born 1961), American writer and academic
- Sam Hartman (born 1999), American football player
- Samuel Brubaker Hartman (1830–1918), American businessman and physician
- Sid Hartman (1920–2020), American sports journalist
- Stanisław Hartman (1914–1992), Polish-Jewish mathematician
- Steve Hartman (sportscaster) (born 1958), American sportscaster
- Steve Hartman (born 1963), American broadcast journalist

=== T ===
- Tim Hartman (born 1965), American Filipino martial artist
- Tova Hartman (born 1957), Israeli gender studies scholar, daughter of David Hartman (rabbi)

=== V ===
- Victor Hartman (1839–1898), Swedish actor

=== W ===
- Wiesław Hartman (1950–2021), Polish equestrian
- Wink Hartman (born 1946), American businessman

=== Matrilineal surnames ===
People with the Hartman surname serving as a secondary surname.

- Daniël Hartman Craven (1910–1993), South African rugby player, coach and administrator
- Daniel Hartman Hastings (1849–1903), U.S. politician who was governor of Pennsylvania

=== Fictional characters ===
- Dr. Elmer Hartman, Family Guy character named after Elmer "Butch" Hartman
- Erik Hartman, fictitious Belgian reality show presenter
- Mary Hartman, eponymous character of the satirical soap opera Mary Hartman, Mary Hartman
- Gunnery Sergeant Hartman, a character in the 1987 film Full Metal Jacket
- Rudolf Hartmann, eponymous character of the book Hartmann_the_Anarchist

== Given name ==
- Hartman Bache (1798–1872), American lighthouse engineer
- Hartman H. Lomawaima (1949–2008), Native American director of the Arizona State Museum
- Hartman Longley (born 1952), Chief Justice of The Commonwealth of The Bahamas
- Hartman Louis Oberlander (1864–1922), American baseball pitcher
- Hartman Rector Jr. (1924–2018), American Latter Day Saints leader
- Hartman Toromba (born 1984), Namibian football defender
- Hartman Turnbow (1905–1988), American Civil Rights activist

== Middle names ==
- Lillian Hartman Hoddeson (born 1940), American science historian
- Lloyd Hartman Elliott (1918–2013), American educational administrator and president of several universities
- William Hartman Woodin (1868–1934), American industrialist

== See also ==
- Hartmann
- Hardman
- Hartman (disambiguation)
