= Hartmann =

Hartmann is a German surname. It is less frequently used as a male given name. The name originates from the Germanic word, "hart", which translates in English to "hardy", "hard", or "tough" and "Mann", a suffix meaning "man", "person", or "husband". The name Hartman, distinguished by ending with a single "n", is generally the result of the anglicisation of names that occurred with the emigration of persons from German-speaking to anglophone nations in the 18th, 19th and early 20th century. Below is a list of notable individuals and fictional characters with the surname or given name of Hartmann.

== Arts and media ==
- Hartmann von Aue (c. 1170 – c. 1210) German poet
- Lukas Hartmann (1944), Swiss novelist and children's literature writer
- Matthias Hartmann (born 1963), German theatre director
- Moritz Hartmann (1821–1872), Bohemian-Austrian Jewish poet
- Oluf Hartmann (1879–1910), Danish painter
- Paul Hartmann (1889–1977), German actor
- Petra Hartmann (born 1970), German author and literature scientist
- Sadakichi Hartmann (1867–1944), German-Japanese art critic long resident in America
- Sieglinde Hartmann (born 1954), German medievalist, expert on the medieval poet Oswald von Wolkenstein
- Tatjana Saphira Hartmann (born 1997), Indonesian actress, model, singer
- Thom Hartmann (born 1951), American radio host, author and commentator
- Viktor Hartmann (1834–1873), Russian architect and painter
- Bodil Neergaard née Hartmann (1867–1959), Danish estate owner, philanthropist and memoirist.

== Music ==
- Axel Hartmann, German designer known for his work on electronic musical instruments by Moog, Waldorf Music, Arturia, Kurzweil Music Systems, and many more
- Emil Hartmann (1836–1898), Danish composer, eldest son of Johan Peter Emilius Hartmann and brother-in-law to Niels Gade and August Winding
- Erich Hartmann (1920–2020), German double bass player and composer
- Georges Hartmann (1843–1900), French music publisher and librettist under the pen name Henri Grémont
- Hartmann von An der Lan-Hochbrunn (Father Hartmann) (1863–1914), Austrian composer
- Johan Peter Emilius Hartmann (1805–1900), Danish composer and organist
- John Hartmann (1830–1897), bandmaster to the Duke of Cambridge, Prussian brass composer
- Karl Amadeus Hartmann (1905–1963), German composer
- Oliver Hartmann (born 1970), German metal vocalist, songwriter, and producer
- Thomas de Hartmann (1885–1956), Russian composer and associate of George Ivanovitch Gurdjieff

== Science and medicine ==
- Ernst Hartmann (1915–1992), German medical doctor, author and publicist
- Franz Hartmann (1838–1912), German medical doctor and Theosophist
- Heidrun Hartmann (1942–2016), German botanist
- Heinz Hartmann (1894–1970), Viennese psychoanalyst, developer of Ego Psychology
- Henri Albert Hartmann (1860–1952), French surgeon
- Jutta Hartmann (1963), German academic and professor of pedagogy and social work
- Johann Daniel Wilhelm Hartmann, (1793–1862) Swiss malacologist
- Johannes Hartmann (1568–1631), German chemist
- Johannes Franz Hartmann (1865–1936), German astronomer active in Argentina and namesake of the Hartmann crater
- Reinhard Hartmann (1938–2024), Austrian-born English lexicographer and applied linguist
- Robert Hartmann (naturalist) (1832–1893), German naturalist, anatomist and ethnographer
- Peter E. Hartmann, Australian scientist, co-winner of the 2010 Rank Prize for Nutrition
- William Kenneth Hartmann (born 1939), American planetary scientist
- William M. Hartmann (born 1939), American acoustician and physicist

== Philosophy ==
- Karl Robert Eduard von Hartmann (1842–1906), German philosopher of the unconscious
- Nicolai Hartmann (1882–1950), German philosopher
- Stephan Hartmann (born 1968), German philosopher

== State: military, government, religion ==
- André Frédéric Hartmann (1772–1861), French manufacturer and politician
- Bastian Hartmann (born 1984), German politician
- Djenabou Diallo-Hartmann (born 1985), German politician
- Erich Hartmann (1922–1993), German fighter ace
- Ernst Hartmann (1897–1945), German SS-Brigadeführer
- Felix von Hartmann (1851–1919), Cardinal Archbishop of Köln
- Jakob von Hartmann, (1795–1873), Bavarian general
- Heidi Hartmann (born 1945) American feminist economist
- Ludo Moritz Hartmann, Austrian Jewish historian and statesman
- Michael Hartmann (judge) (born 1944), a Hong Kong judge born in Mumbai
- Michael Hartmann (politician) (born 1963), German politician
- Otto Hartmann (aviator) (1889-1917), German World War I flying ace
- Robert Hartmann (advisor) (1917–2008), counselor to President Gerald Ford
- Sebastian Hartmann (born 1977), German politician
- Thomas W. Hartmann, American military lawyer and director of Guantanamo Bay detention camp
- Walter Hartmann (born 1949), Liechtenstein politician
- Verena Hartmann (born 1974), German politician

== Economic ==
- Gustav Hartmann, son of Richard Hartmann (1842–1910), Saxonian engineering manufacturer and manager
- Richard Hartmann (1809–1878), German engineering manufacturer, "locomotive king of Saxony"

== Sport ==
- Gerhard Hartmann (born 1955), Austrian long-distance runner
- Karel Hartmann, Czech ice hockey player and official
- Reinhard Hartmann (wrestler) (born 1953), Austrian wrestler
- Robert Hartmann (referee) (born 1979)
- Waldemar Hartmann (born 1948), German sports journalist

== Other people ==
- Hartmann Schedel of Nuremberg (1440–1514), German physician, humanist, historian, cartographer and printer

== Fictional characters ==
- Erica Hartmann, a character from the anime/manga series Strike Witches
- Ursula Hartmann, a character from the anime/manga series Strike Witches
- Henri Hartmann, a character from a DnD campaign Halls of Ivy

== See also ==
- Hartmann (disambiguation)
- Hartman, anglicized form of Hartmann
