= Johan Hartmann =

Johan, Johann, or Johannes Hartmann may refer to:

- Johannes Hartmann (1568–1631), German chemist
- Johannes Franz Hartmann (1865–1936), German physicist and astronomer
- Johann Hartmann (1726–1793), Danish composer
- Johan Ernst Hartmann (1770–1844), Danish composer
- Johan Peter Emilius Hartmann (1805–1900), Danish composer

== See also ==
- Carl Johan Hartman (1790–1849), Swedish physician and botanist
- Hartmann
- Hartman
- John Hartmann
- John Hartman (disambiguation)
