= Carl Hartman =

Carl Hartman may refer to:

- Carl Hartman (botanist) (1824–1884), Swedish botanist, son of Carl Johan Hartman, with the botanical author abbreviation C.Hartm.
- Carl Johan Hartman (1790–1849), Swedish physician and botanist, with the botanical author abbreviation Hartm.
- Carl Vilhelm Hartman (1862–1941), Swedish botanist and anthropologist, with the botanical author abbreviation C.V.Hartm.

== See also ==
- Carl Hartmann (disambiguation)
