= John Hartman (disambiguation) =

John Hartman, John Hartmann, or Johnny Hartman may refer to:

== People ==
- John Hartman (1950–2021), U.S. musician, founding drummer of the Doobie Brothers
- John Daniel Leinbach Hartman (1865–1953), U.S. Army officer
- John Hartman (artist) (born 1950), Canadian painter and printmaker
- John Hartman, a fictional character in the Peter Bunzl book Cogheart
- Johnny Hartman (1923–1983), U.S. jazz singer
- John Hartmann (1830–1897), Prussian composer
- John W. Hartmann (born 1967), U.S. politician
- John Hartmann, a computer scientist who developed the Hartmann pipeline

== Places ==
- John T. Hartman Elementary School, Kansas City Public Schools, Kansas City, Missouri, USA

== Other uses ==
- Johnny Hartman, Johnny Hartman (album), 1977 album by singer Johnny Hartman

== See also ==
- Arthur John Hartman (1888–1970), U.S. pilot and planebuilder
- Michael John Hartmann, a Hong Kong judge
- John Hartmann Eriksen (1957–2002), Danish soccer player
- John Hartman Morgan (1876–1955), UK lawyer
- John Hardman (disambiguation)
- Johan Hartmann (disambiguation)
- Hartmann
- Hartman
- John (disambiguation)
