= Robert Rosenswig =

Robert M. Rosenswig is a Mesoamerican archaeologist born on Oct. 30, 1968, in Montreal, Canada. He earned a B.A. at McGill University in 1994, an M.A. at the University of British Columbia in 1998 and a Ph.D. in 2005 from Yale University. Rosenswig currently conducts research projects in Mexico, Belize, and Costa Rica. His research explores the emergence of sociopolitical complexity and the development of agriculture.

In 2006, he began teaching in the Department of Anthropology at the University at Albany, State University of New York. Rosenswig is currently the director of the Institute of Mesoamerica Studies (IMS) at UAlbany.

== Research ==
=== Chiapas, Mexico ===
Rosenswig’s work in Mexico has been concentrated in the Soconusco region of Chiapas Mexico. He began the Soconusco Formative Project in 2001 for his dissertation research which included settlement survey and excavations at the coastal site of Cuauhtémoc. The project addresses the role of Olmec inter-regional interaction and contributed data on long-term processes of agricultural origins and the development of social stratification for the Soconusco region.

Rosenswig has worked in the Soconusco region is the Izapa Regional Settlement Project (IRSP) that began in 2011. This project provided the first settlement data associated with the Formative period kingdom of Izapa. The IRSP project developed lidar (light detection and ranging) maps of Izapa and surrounding regions. Together with archaeological survey this project sought to establish a better understanding of settlement patterns and the development of sociopolitical complexity for this region.

=== Northern Belize ===
Rosenswig has conducted research in northern Belize for two principal time periods, the Mesoamerican Formative period and the Mesoamerican Archaic period (see Mesoamerican Chronology). Formative period occupation in northern Belize has been documented at the archaeological site of San Estevan, located in the New River region of Belize. San Estevan was occupied during the Middle and Late Formative periods.

Rosenswig has worked on the Late Archaic period occupation of northern Belize was in the Freshwater Creek drainage. Seven Archaic period sites have been documented from which starch grains of domesticated plants and lithic tools reveal adaptive patterns of these early horticulturalists. This research explores the origins of agriculture and settled life and the influence of the 4.2k BP Event as acting as a catalyst for the end of the Archaic period in Mesoamerica.

=== Costa Rica ===
Together with Ricardo Vázquez Leiva, of the Museo Nacional de Costa Rica, Rosenswig is also co-director of archaeological excavations at the site of Las Mercedes located on the property of EARTH University. Rosenswig and Vázquez’s research at Las Mercedes investigates life at this chiefly center, occupied from AD 1000-1500.

== Publications ==
=== Books ===
- 2017, Rosenswig, Robert M and Jerimy J. Cunningham, editors.Modes of Production and Archaeology, University Press of Florida, Gainesville.
- 2012, Burger, Richard L. and Robert M. Rosenswig, editors. Early New World Monumentality. University Press of Florida, Gainesville.
- 2010, Rosenswig, Robert M.The Beginnings of Mesoamerican Civilization: Inter-Regional Interaction and the Olmec. Cambridge University Press, New York.

=== Journal articles ===
- 2016, Rosenswig, Robert M. and Rebecca R. Mendelsohn. Izapa and the Soconusco Region, Mexico, in the First Millennium A.D. Latin American Antiquity 27 (3): 357-377.
- 2015, Rosenswig, Robert M., Amber M. VanDerwarker, Brendan J. Culleton, and Douglas J. Kennett. Is it Agriculture Yet? Intensified Maize-Use at 1000 cal BC in the Soconusco and Mesoamerica. Journal of Anthropological Archaeology 40 (4): 89-108.
- 2015, Robert M. Rosenswig, Ricardo López-Torrijos, Caroline E. Antonelli. Lidar Data and the Izapa Polity: New Results and Methodological Issues from Tropical Mesoamerica. Anthropological and Archaeological Sciences 7 (4): 487-504.
- 2015, Rosenswig, Robert M. A Mosaic of Adaptation: The Archaeological Record for Mesoamerica’s Archaic Period. Journal of Archaeological Research 23 (2): 115-162.
- 2014, Rosenswig, Robert M., Deborah M. Pearsall, Marilyn A. Masson, Brendon J. Culleton and Douglas J. Kennett. Archaic Period Settlement and Subsistence in the Maya Lowlands: new starch grain and lithic data from Freshwater Creek, Belize. Journal of Archaeological Science 41(1): 308-321.
- 2014, Ricardo Vázquez Leiva, Jared Latimer, Robert M. Rosenswig. Exploración y contextualización sociopolítica del sitio arquitectónico La Iberia, Caribe Central de Costa Rica. Vínculos 33 (1-2): 33-60.
- 2013, Robert M. Rosenswig, Ricardo López-Torrijos, Caroline E. Antonelli, Rebecca R. Mendelsohn. Lidar Mapping and Surface Survey of the Izapa State on the Tropical Piedmont of Chiapas, Mexico. Journal of Archaeological Science 40 (3): 1493-1507.
- 2012, Rosenswig, Robert M. Materialism, Mode of Production and A Millennium of Change in Southern Mexico. Journal of Archaeological Method and Theory 19 (1): 1-48.
- 2009, Rosenswig, Robert M. Early Mesoamerican Garbage: Ceramic and Daub Discard Patterns from Cuauhtémoc, Soconusco, Mexico. Journal of Archaeological Method and Theory 16 (1): 1-32.
- 2008, Rosenswig, Robert M. Prehispanic Settlement in the Cuauhtémoc Region of the Soconusco, Chiapas, Mexico. Journal of Field Archaeology 33 (4): 389-411.
- 2008, Rosenswig, Robert M. and Douglas J. Kennett. Reassessing San Estevan’s Role in the Late Formative Political Geography of Northern Belize. Latin American Antiquity 19 (2): 124-146.
- 2007, Rosenswig, Robert M. Beyond Identifying Elites: Feasting as a Means to Understand Early Middle Formative Society on the Pacific Coast of Mexico. Journal of Anthropological Archaeology 26 (1): 1-27.
- 2006, Rosenswig, Robert M. Sedentism and Food Production in Early Complex Societies of the Soconusco, Mexico. World Archaeology 38 (2): 329-354.
