= Carl Hartmann =

Carl Hartmann may refer to:

- Carl Friedrich Alexander Hartmann (1796-1863), German mineralogist and mining engineer
- Carl Hartmann (footballer) (1894–1943), German footballer
- Carl Hartmann (sculptor) (1837–1901), Danish sculptor
- Carl Wilhelm Hartmann (1880–1957), Norwegian public prosecutor, judge and politician

== See also ==
- Carl Hartman (disambiguation)
