= Las Mercedes (archaeological site, Costa Rica) =

Costa Rican complex archaeological site

Coordinates: 10°10′N 83°37′W

Las Mercedes (L-289-LM) is a complex archaeological site located on the Caribbean slope of Costa Rica between the foothills of Turrialba Volcano and the alluvial plain. The site contains a variety of architectural features including platforms, plazas, retaining walls or terraces, funerary areas, ramps, and paved roads.

== Location ==
Las Mercedes is located 90 m above sea level in Mercedes District, Guácimo, Limón Province, Costa Rica between the rivers Dos Novillos and Parismina, which are tributaries to the Reventazón River. Dos Novillos River is 700 m to the southeast and Parismina is 2.5 km to the northeast of the site.

== Description ==
With a size of 25 hectares, Las Mercedes is divided into 3 large complexes: Las Mercedes-1, Las Mercedes-2, and Las Mercedes-3. However, only Las Mercedes-1 has been extensively studied. Recent excavations at Las Mercedes-1 (L-289 LM-1) have revealed that it has an area of 5 hectares and consists of 7 platforms, 2 plazas, 6 retaining walls or terraces, 7 walls, 4 funerary areas, 1 ramp, and is where the 2 roads converge.

== Chronology ==
Investigations in this part of the site have determined that the site was occupied from circa 1500 BC to circa AD 1500 and that monumental architecture began being constructed around AD 1000. We know that the former inhabitants of Las Mercedes were still living there at the time of the initial Spanish arrival because a number of glass beads of historic European origin have been found during excavations. This indicated that trade may have occurred between the Las Mercedes inhabitants and the Spanish.

=== Platforms ===
In all, Las Mercedes has at least 15 platforms. Three of these platforms are located around a principal/central platform (known as the Hartman Platform), and are united by intra-site causeways. The Hartman Platform (R1) is 6 metres tall and has a diameter of 30 metres. It was first excavated by C. V. Hartman who removed two 1.85 male stone male "warrior" figurines among other artifacts. Today these sculptures are housed at the Museum of Ethnography, Sweden.

Three of the 15 platforms have been studied more extensively. Platform R12 is circular, 1 metre tall, and has a 28-metre diameter. Moreover, this platform is accompanied by 7 metre wide, 30 metre long ramp or causeway (R11), which connects to a stone terrace (R10). The second most studied platform (R9) is actually two conjoined platforms with a figure eight shape. The circular part has a 25-metre diameter and the oblong part measures 22x20 metres. The third of these platforms (R14) has an irregular shape "like a peanut" according to archaeologist Ricardo Vásquez.

All of these platforms, circular or not, are thought to have been covered with conical shaped huts made out of organic materials that have decomposed without a trace.

=== Causeways ===
Las Mercedes is the home of two well-documented stone-paved roads, named The Iroquois Causeway and The Pocora Causeway for the present-day towns they lead towards from the main architectural complex of the site. With widths ranging between 5 and 8 meters, they follow a northwest to southeast path, running perpendicular to the river drainage system. The research to date has registered much data about The Pocora Causeway, whereas our knowledge of The Iroquois Causeway will never be complete due to its alteration and partial destruction over the years. The straight stone-paved Iroquois Causeway has been followed for about 660 m at the edge of the EARTH University reserve that contains the site. However, researchers predict that it extended as far as the Iroquois settlement. Although The Iroquois Causeway has not been followed in its totality, it may be presumed that it is of a comparable length to The Pocora Causeway, based on their similarity in design.

The Pocora Causeway begins in the main complex and extends for an indefinite distance, going beyond the zone southeast of the complex, where it was not possible to clear vegetation during the 2005 field season. The Pocora Causeway continues for more than 300 m, running parallel to a secondary road, which connects to the Dos Novillos River. This causeway was raised above the surface as a protective measure against flooding. When The Pocora Causeway reaches its southeast extent, it comes to an end intersecting with a small stream known as Santa Emilia. Just before it reaches the stream The Pocora Causeway is flanked by an architectural complex consisting of two low walls with circular halves on the southeast side (R31 & R32), resembling those of the main complex. A set of stairs (R33) between the circular structures, descends to the stream.

There may have once been a suspension bridge across Santa Emilia, connecting the two roads and the two architectural complexes. Such suspension bridges may have once also crossed the channels of the rivers Dos Novillos and Iroquois, too. The researchers think that this road system included a stone drainage system to reduce the effect of water flow across the road surfaces, however none have been identified. In the area near the stream Santa Emilia a footpath with a width of 3 meters was defined by a linear depression in the land’s surface. This unnamed footpath extends in the same general direction as the road, and was followed as far as 150 m. However, it seems to disappear about 400 meters before reaching Destierro River.

Both the Iroquois and Pocora causeways offered formalized, controlled, and ceremonial access to the central part of Las Mercedes-1 architectural complex. The roads go in opposite directions from the center of the site along a route perpendicular to the hydrographic system. The geographic context of Las Mercedes-1, located between streams and rivers on all sides, has raised the question of whether the sphere of influence of a chiefly political center might be bounded by hydrographic systems. It might have been that these surrounding hydrographic systems served defensive functions as naturally existing barriers.

The Pocora Causeways does not communicate directly with another archaeological site, but is aiming towards Williamsburg (L-58Wb) 3.5 km to the southeast of Las Mercedes-1. While the causeway ends 1.5 km before reaching Williamsburg, a footpath has been archaeologically identified that may extend the rest of the way connecting these sites.

Viewing these roads as part of one extensive construction project sharing the same constructive techniques, it is obvious that the cost of the roads to the former inhabitants of Las Mercedes-1 must have been great. A lot of time and manpower were required for the preparation of the terrain, the quantity of stone, the volume of fill, and the amount of other construction materials that must have been transported for the construction of these magnificent roads.

=== Funerary Areas ===
The first cemeteries were excavated by C. V. Hartman in 1896 and subsequently by Alanson Skinner during the winter of 1916-1917. Hartman excavated a total of 17 graves in four different circular funerary platforms and Skinner also excavated in 4 different cemeteries. Both of these excavations revealed rectangular, box-shaped, stone-lined graves, most of which had cobblestone walls with both a flat limestone floor and roof. Hartman only found the remains of human bones in one of the graves. Most of the graves he excavated contained ceramic vessels and other burial goods. The ceramics were said to have shown wear marks indicating that they were once employed as cooking utensils or for some other utilitarian purpose. Some of the other contents of graves recorded by Hartman include two stone celts and a European-manufactured bead of blue glass. The latter indicates that the builders of the grave were alive during the 16th century. Skinner's excavations revealed ceramic vessels in the graves along with such other grave goods as incense burners, stone disks, meteoric iron gravers, flint stone knives, greenstone earspools, jade ornaments, a copper bell, carved stone statues and tables, celts, and even some gold or tumbaga objects.

== Site Significance ==
Recent excavations at Las Mercedes are helping archaeologists understand the role it once served to the indigenous peoples of Costa Rica before 1502 when Christopher Columbus arrived in Costa Rica. Archaeologists now believe that Las Mercedes was a political center, like Guayabo de Turrialba. The site is associated with the Huetar people, a Chibchan-speaking people. After analyzing the artifacts uncovered during the 2009 field school archaeologists are relatively certain that Las Mercedes served as a powerful political center for the region—probably the center of a chiefdom. The 2009 excavations also provided evidence contrary to the assertion that all platforms in Costa Rica are circular, because both a figure-eight-shaped platform and a peanut-shaped platform were excavated.

== History of Excavations at Las Mercedes ==
In 1871 Las Mercedes was bisected by the construction of the railroad connecting the country's capital to Puerto Limón on the Caribbean coast. Today part of the site is protected within the campus of the Escuela de Agricultura de la Región Tropical Húmeda or EARTH University.

=== 1871: Minor C. Keith & the Railroad to the Atlantic ===
Las Mercedes was first discovered in 1871 during the construction of the railroad to the Caribbean Sea from the Costa Rican Central Valley, as it was directly in the path of railroad construction. Minor C. Keith, the American commissioned to construct the railroad (and the principle founder of the United Fruit Company), came across a gold artifact at Las Mercedes. This discovery inspired Keith to not only conduct non-scientific excavations at Las Mercedes, but also to collect artifacts from all over Costa Rica. Eventually Mr. Keith collected 16,608 artifacts, some of which were auctioned off after his death. Most of these artifacts, some of which are from Las Mercedes, are now housed by the Brooklyn Museum and the American Museum of Natural History in New York, the Smithsonian Institution in Washington, D.C., and the Ethnography Museum in Sweden. During his life Mr. Keith presented some artifacts to museums. For example, several large stone sculptures were presented to the National Museum in Washington.

=== 1896: Carl Vilhelm Hartman ===
The first archaeological excavations were done by C. V. Hartman, a Swedish botanist and anthropologist in 1896. Hartman's descriptions of his various excavations include an early depiction of the architecture around the principal platform, descriptions of the stone figures he uncovered, descriptions of the architecture of 17 graves found in four different platforms, a description of a "cache" of ceramics in a rectangular sunken chamber, details about an area of concentrated worked stone that may have been a stone cutters work place, a description of a clay pit, and detailed listings of the artifacts found in each grave or other excavation area.

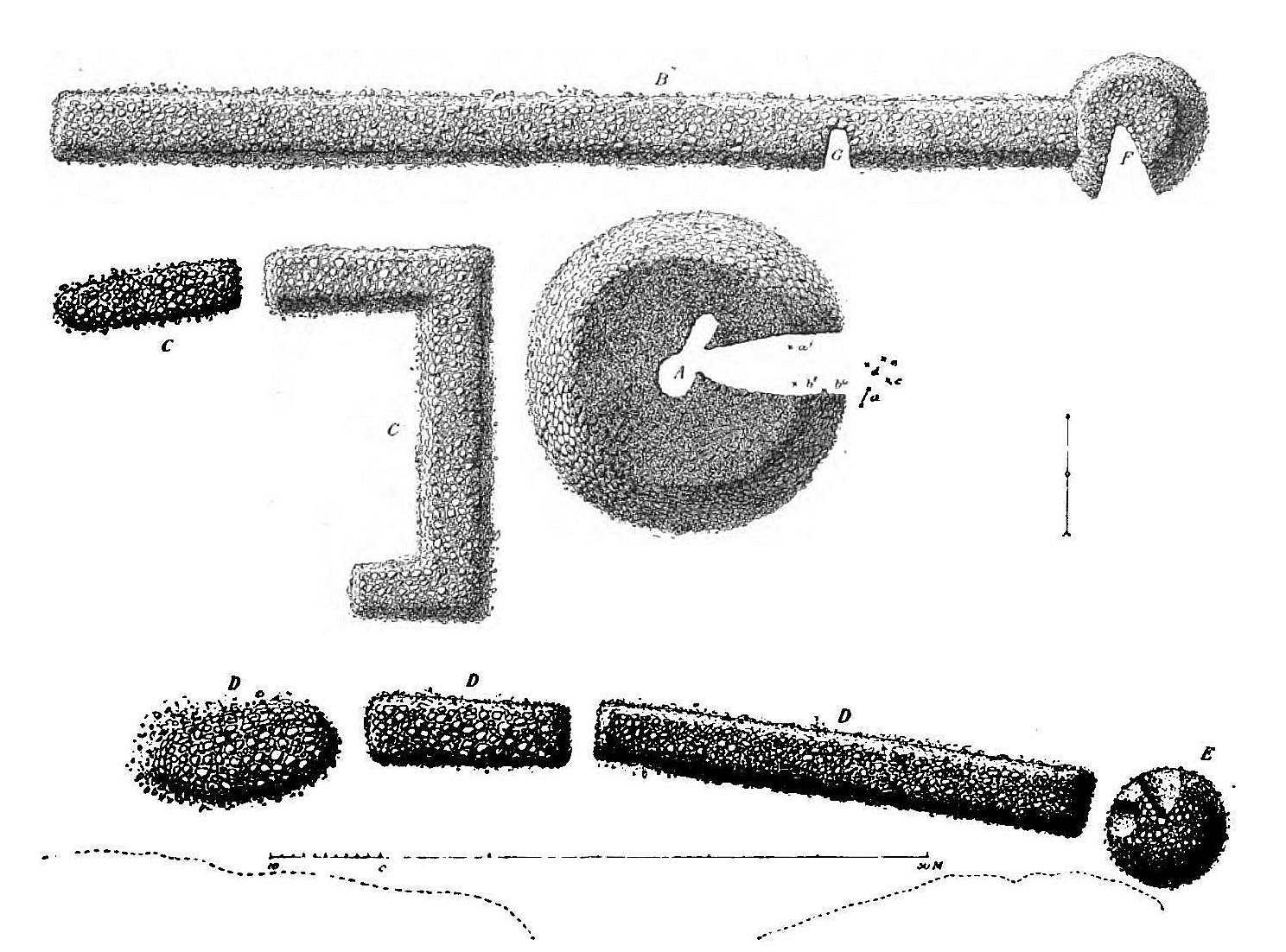
Plan by Hartman for the great mound and walls, Las Mercedes, 1896.

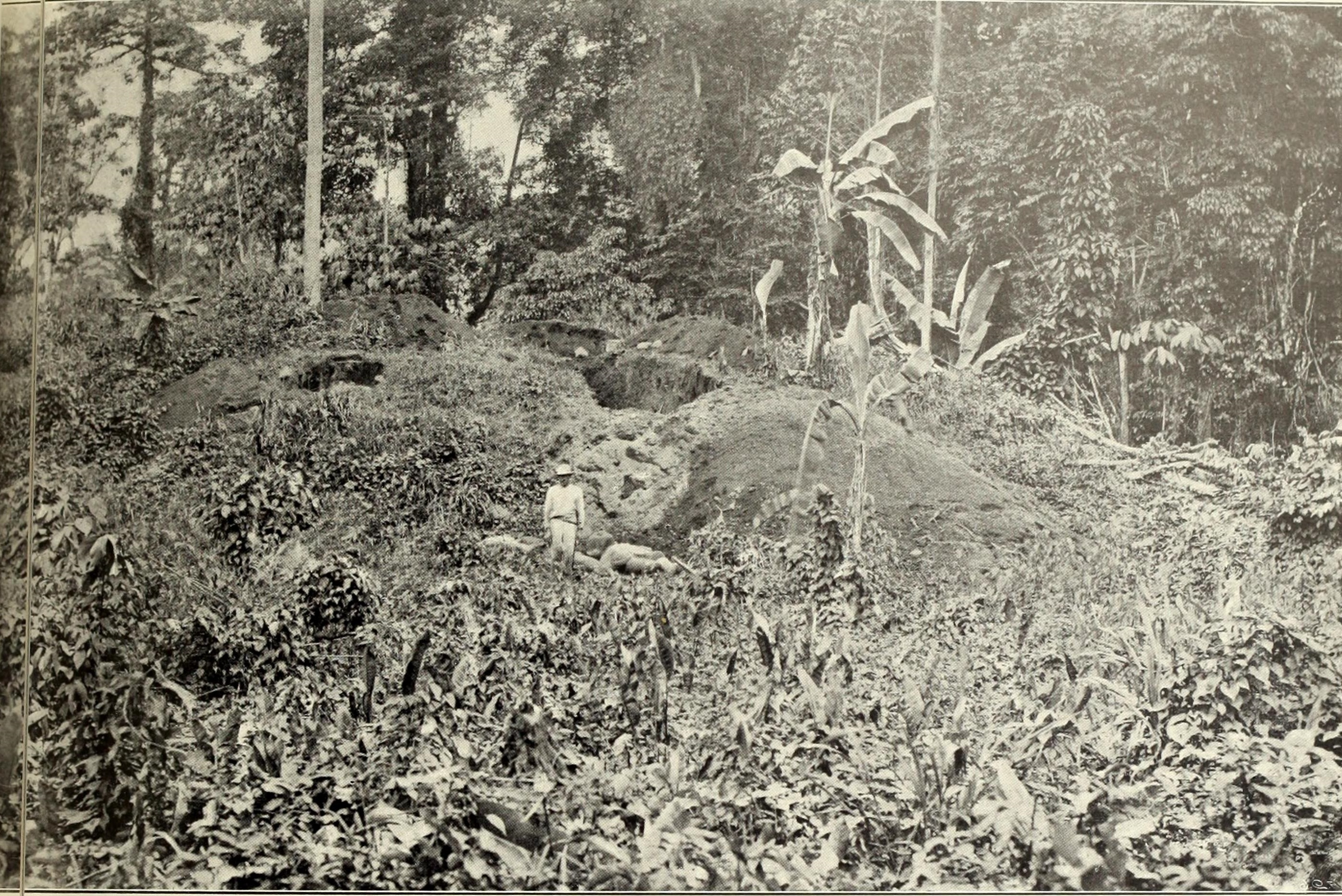
Large mound.

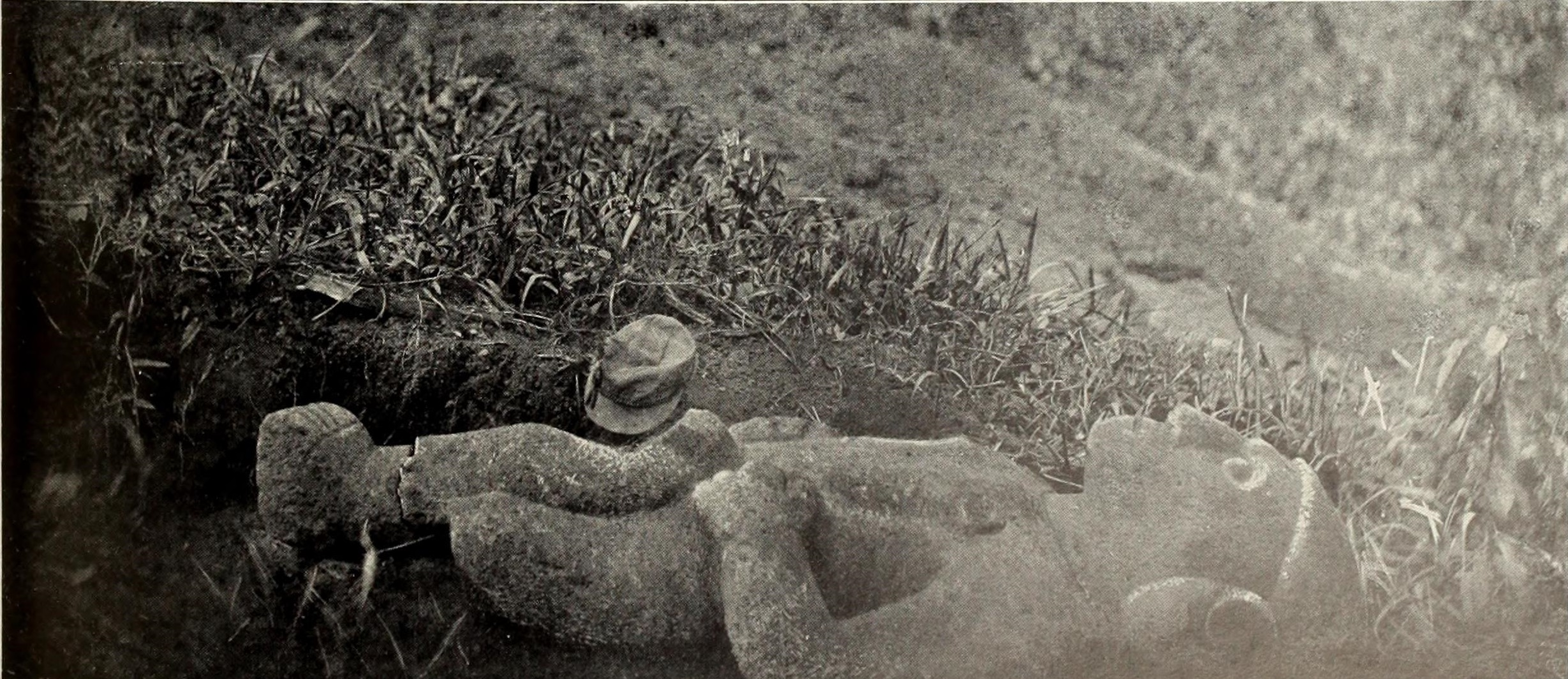
One of the stone statues from the great mound.

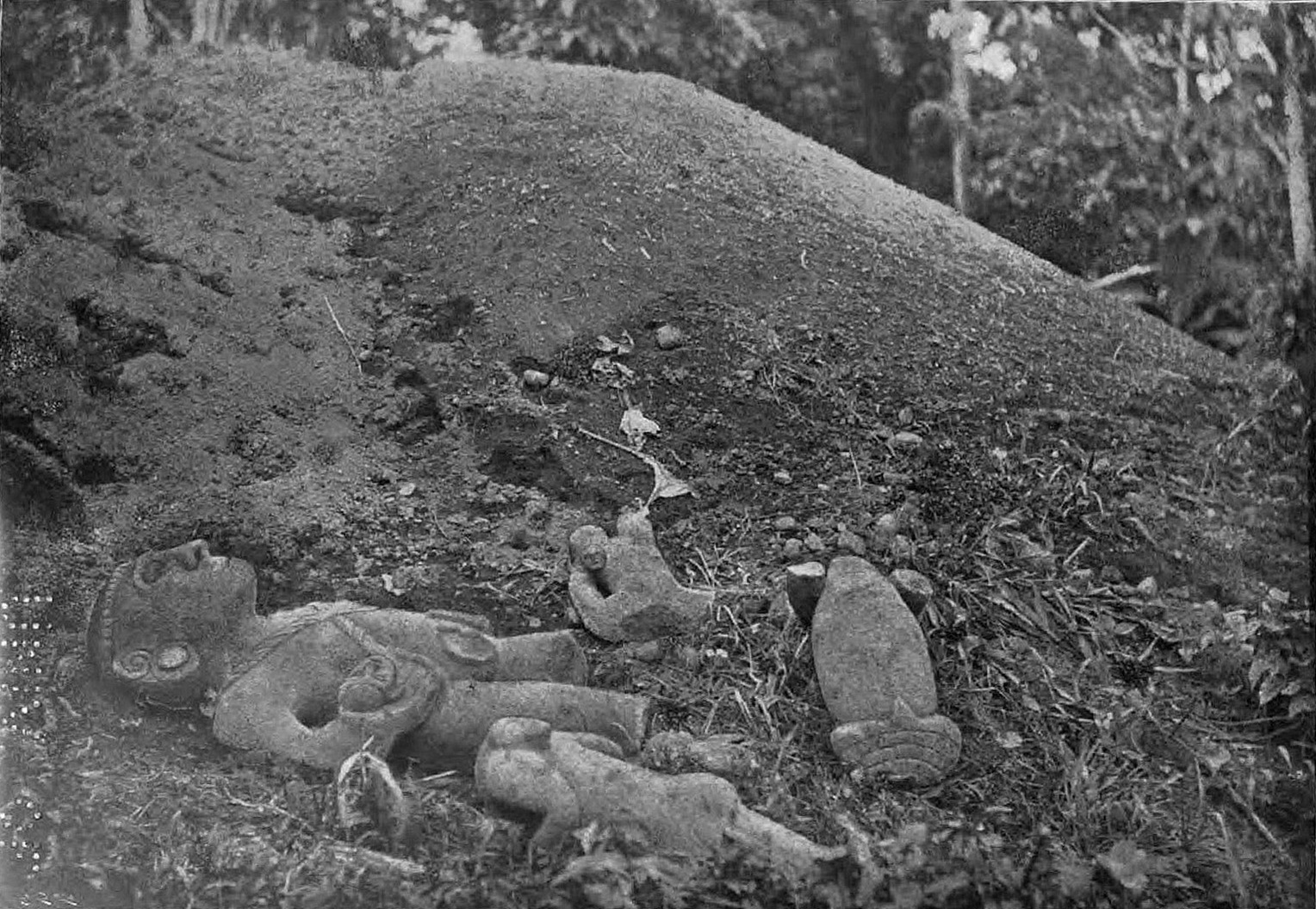
More stone figures from the great mound.

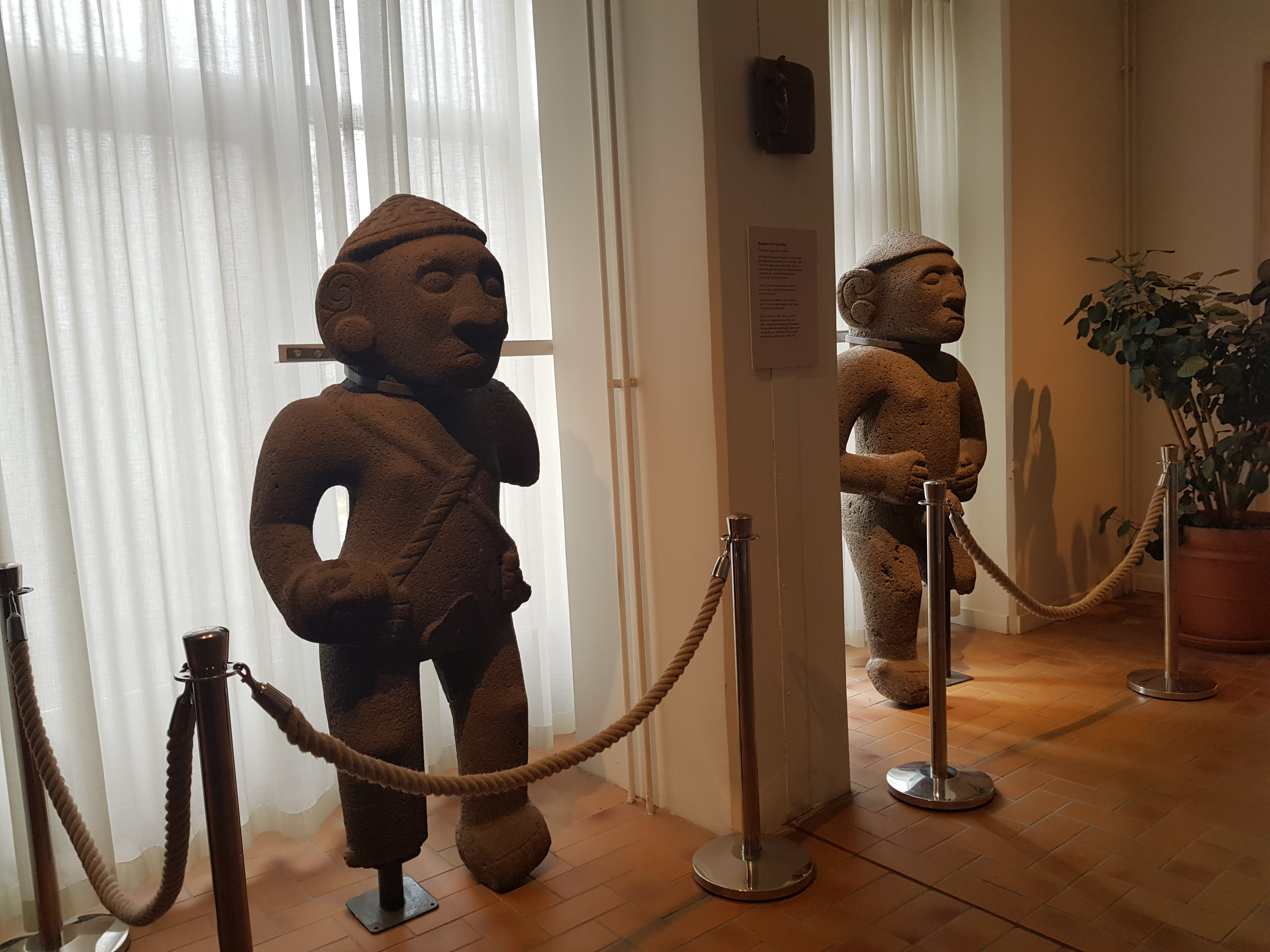
The two big statues on display at the entrance at the Museum of Ethnography, Sweden, 2019.

=== Winter of 1916-1917: Alanson Skinner ===
During the winter of 1916-1917 Alanson Skinner conducted archaeological excavations at Las Mercedes, Anita Grande, and Costa Rica Farm Site. His excavation notes indicate that he excavated parts of four cemeteries and one "mound" or platform, and lists off the artifacts found in each excavation. Skinner's description was the first to note the existence of the causeways. He also mentions that others like Alpizar (who worked for Mr. Keith) and J. H. Wilson had excavated at the site.

=== May and June 2005: Ricardo Vázquez, Claude Chapdelaine, & the University of Montréal Field-School ===
After Skinner completed his excavations only a few minor archaeological investigations were conducted at Las Mercedes until 2005. During May and June 2005 Ricardo Vásquez, an archaeologist from the Museo Nacional de Costa Rica, and Dr. Claude Chapdelaine with a group of his students from the University of Montréal, Canada conducted an archaeological field-school. Their work focused on a 12-acre (49,000 m^{2}) area of the central sector of Las Mercedes. By the end of the field-school, the team's stratigraphic excavations and mapping labors resulted in drawing of a general site plan, digital mapping of the most outstanding architectonic features, dating the site's earliest occupation to around 3,000 years ago, and the beginnings of carbon 14 based chronology for the site.

=== January and February 2009: Ricardo Vázquez, Robert M. Rosenswig, & the UAlbany Field-school ===
In the winter of 2009, between January 11 and February 22, a group of archaeologist from the Museo Nacional de Costa Rica and the State University of New York at Albany (UAlbany), led by Ricardo Vásquez and Robert M. Rosenswig, conducted further investigation. During this archaeological field school a number of important discoveries were made, which caused Las Mercedes to make the news
