= John Hardman =

John Hardman may refer to:

== People ==
- John Hardman (born 1939), British businessman
- Sir John Hardman (1694–1755), British merchant, politician, and slave trader
- John Hardman (stained glass maker) (1766–1844), British stained glass maker, founder of John Hardman & Co.
- John Hardman Powell (1827–1895), British stained glass maker, of John Hardman & Co.
- John Hardman (footballer) (1940-1998), English footballer, see List of Rochdale A.F.C. players (25–99 appearances)

== Other uses ==
- John Hardman Trading Co. (John Hardman & Co.), British stained glass maker (1838–2008)

== See also ==
- Joseph Hardman (c. 1783–1870), English merchant and contributor to Blackwood's Magazine, often incorrectly referred to as John Hardman
- John Hardman Moore (born 1954), British economist
- Everard John Hardman-Jones (1881–1962), British Royal Navy admiral
- John Hartman (disambiguation)
- Hardman (disambiguation)
- John (disambiguation)
