= Hardiman (surname) =

Hardiman is a surname. Notable people with the surname include:

- Adrian Hardiman (1951–2016), justice of the Irish Supreme Court
- Alfred Frank Hardiman (1891–1949), English sculptor
- Derek Hardiman (born 1981), Irish hurler
- James Hardiman (1782–1855), Irish librarian and author
- Neasa Hardiman, Irish director
- Paul Hardiman (born 1955), British music producer
- Rachel Hardiman (born 1961), Irish cricketer
- Ronan Hardiman (born 1961), Irish composer
- Terrence Hardiman (1937–2023), English actor
- Thomas Hardiman (born 1965), American judge
- Tom Hardiman (born 1985), British film director and screenwriter
- Vertus Hardiman (1922–2007), American victim of a radiation experiment

== See also ==
- Hardiman, GE engineering project
- Hardeman (surname)
- Hardman (surname)
