= Hardman (surname) =

Hardman is a surname. Notable people with the surname include:

- Artina Tinsley Hardman, American politician
- Brian Hardman, New Zealand footballer
- David Hardman, British politician
- Dave Hardman, Pornographic actor
- Derek Hardman, American football player
- Donald Hardman, British Royal Air Force officer and flying ace
- Christine Hardman, British Anglican bishop
- E. Chambré Hardman, British photographer
- Edward Hardman, Anglo-Irish politician
- Edward Townley Hardman, Anglo-Irish geologist
- Frederick Hardman, English journalist and novelist
- Harold Hardman, English footballer
- Henry Hardman, English civil servant and economist
- Isabel Hardman, English political journalist
- Lamartine Griffin Hardman, American politician
- John Hardman (disambiguation)
- Joseph Hardman, English merchant and writer
- Mary Juliana Hardman, English nun
- Mecole Hardman, American football player
- Peter Hardman, English racing driver
- Richard Hardman, British geologist
- Robert Hardman, British journalist, author, and filmmaker
- Sarah Hardman, English model and actress
- Sean Hardman, Australian rugby player
- Shirley Hardman, New Zealand sprinter
- Tom Hardman, English cricketer
- Zoe Hardman, British actress and television presenter

== Fictional characters ==
- Cyrus Hardman, a detective in Agatha Christie's novel Murder on the Orient Express

== See also ==
- Hardeman (surname)
- Hardiman (surname)
- Hardy (surname)
