= Hardeman (surname) =

Hardeman is a surname. Notable people with the surname include:

- Bailey Hardeman (1795–1836), American lawyer and politician
- Buddy Hardeman (born 1954), American football player
- Don Hardeman (1952–2016), American football player
- Dorsey B. Hardeman (1902–1992), American politician, lawyer and businessman
- Ernie Hardeman (born 1947), Canadian politician
- Gary Hardeman (born 1950), Australian rules footballer
- N. B. Hardeman (1874–1965), American educator
- Rachel Hardeman, American public health academic
- Thomas Hardeman (1750–1833), North Carolina and Tennessee politician
- Thomas Hardeman Jr. (1825–1891), American politician, lawyer and Confederate States Army officer
- Thomas Jones Hardeman (1788–1854), Tennessee land owner and Texas politician
- William Polk Hardeman (1816–1898), Confederate States Army general

== See also ==
- Hardiman
- Hardman
