= Waldemar Hartmann =

German sports journalist (born 1948)

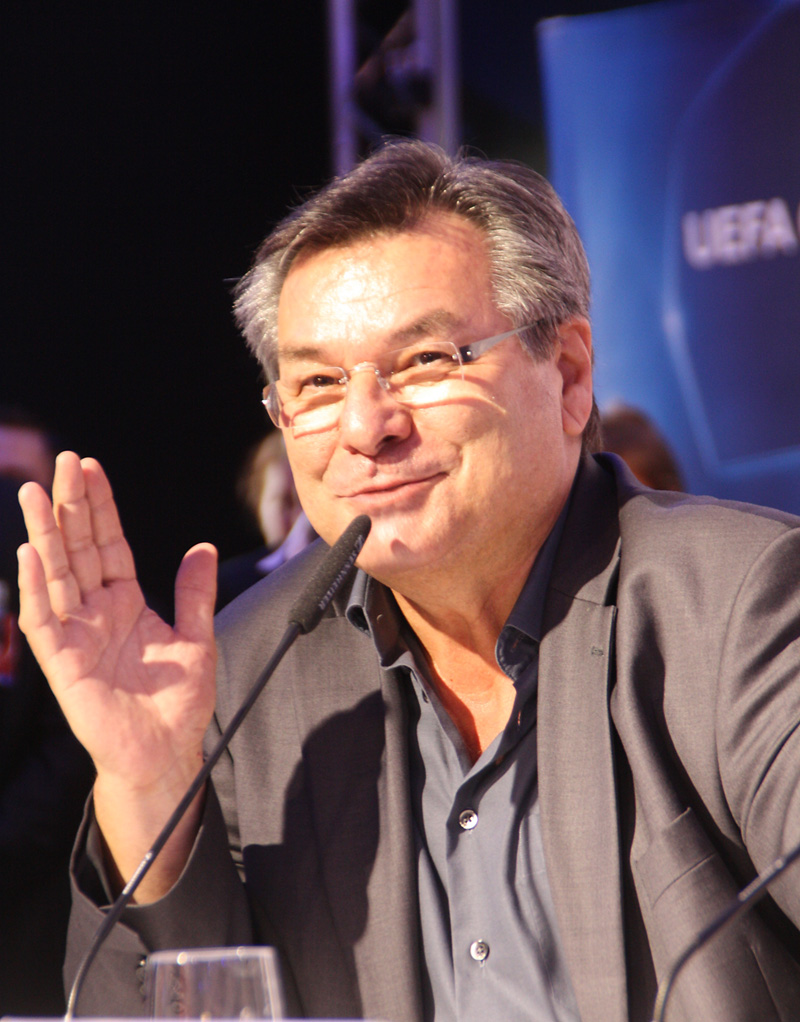
Hartmann in 2010

Waldemar Hartmann (born 10 March 1948 in Nürnberg) is a German sports journalist.

== Life ==
Hartmann worked since 1971 for German broadcaster Bayerischer Rundfunk (BR) and later for sport magazine Sportschau on German broadcaster ARD. Hartmann is married for a third time and lives in Chur, Switzerland. He has two children.

== Works ==
- Hartmann, Waldemar (2010). Populäre Bayern-Irrtümer ein Lexikon (in German). Berlin. ISBN 978-3-86124-647-3. OCLC 664387883.
