= Carl Hartman (botanist) =

Swedish botanist (1824–1884)

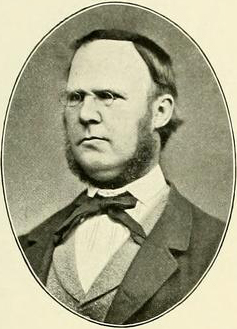
Carl Hartman

Carl Hartman (5 June 1824 in Solna – 19 April 1884 in Örebro) was a Swedish botanist. He was the son of Carl Johan Hartman, also a botanist.
