= Olov Hartman =

Swedish hymnwriter and writer

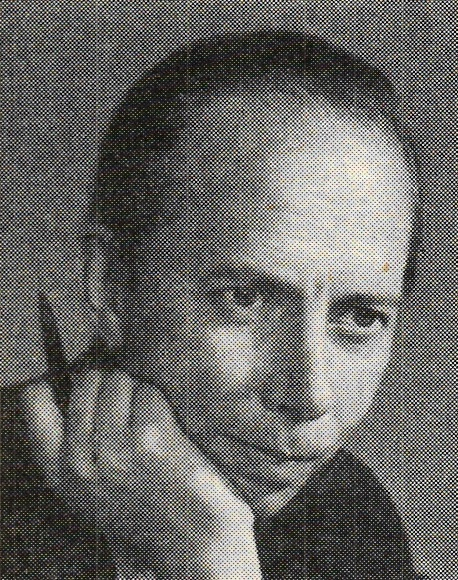
- Born: 1906
- Died: 1982 (aged 75–76)
- Occupations: Theologian, novelist, hymnwriter

Olov Hartman (1906–1982) was a Swedish hymnwriter, novelist, and Lutheran theologian.

Hartman's parents were active with the Salvation Army in Sweden. He became a Lutheran minister, theologian and hymnwriter. He was director of the Sigtuna Foundation, a spiritual retreat center, from 1948 to 1971. He spoke at American colleges including Susquehanna College and California Lutheran College in 1971.

Hartman married Ingrid Olsson; their son Lars Olov Hartman was a professor of religion at Uppsala University. Hartman died in 1982, in his seventies.

== Publications ==
- The Sudden Sun (novel)
- Holy Masquerade (1963, novel)
- The Crucified Answer (Lenten readings)
- The Birth of God (Advent readings)
- Prophet and Carpenter (1966, liturgical drama)
- Earthly Things (1968, essays)
- Marching Orders (1970, novel)
- "Counterpoint: A Prophecy Concerning War and Peace" (1971, speech)
- The Crown of Life (liturgical drama)
