= Petra Hartmann =

German novelist, journalist and author

Petra Hartmann (born 1970 in Hildesheim) is a German novelist, journalist and author.

== Life ==
Petra Hartmann grew up in Sillium, a little village near Hildesheim. She visited a humanistic secondary school in Hildesheim and studied German language and literature, philosophy and politics at the University of Hannover. Than she made her doctors degree with a thesis about the young German author Theodor Mundt. During her studying time she worked as a freelance journalist for several newspapers in Lower Saxony and Bremerhaven. After a two years traineeship she became an editor at a daily newspaper in Springe, where she was working for five years. She was a freelance author and journalist and worked at the newspaper Volksstimme at Gardelegen. At present she is an editor of the German newspaper Goslarsche Zeitung in Goslar.

== Writing ==
Petra Hartmann is writing fantasy and fairytales. She won the bronze-medaille of the Storyolympiade three times (1999, 2000 and 2001). In 2008 she won the German Phantastik Price. She published three novels, which were playing in the fantasy-world Movenna. Her main publisher is Wurdack Publishing. For this publisher she was editor of two anthologies of fairytales, too. Furthermore, she wrote novellas for Arcanum Publishing. As a literature scientist her focus is on Young Germany (especially Theodor Mundt, Gustav Kühne and Charlotte Stieglitz). She published also essays about Uwe Johnson, about adaptions of the Faust- and Don Juan-theme, about thematic motifs of fantasy and journalistic writing

== Selected works ==
=== Books ===
- Faust und Don Juan. Ein Verschmelzungsprozeß, dargestellt anhand der Autoren Wolfgang Amadeus Mozart, Johann Wolfgang von Goethe, Nikolaus Lenau, Christian Dietrich Grabbe, Gustav Kühne und Theodor Mundt. Stuttgart: ibidem Publishing, 1998. ISBN 3-932602-29-3
- Von Zukunft trunken und keiner Gegenwart voll. Theodor Mundts literarische Entwicklung vom Buch der Bewegung zum historischen Roman. Dissertation. Bielefeld: Aisthesis, 2003. ISBN 3-89528-390-8
- Geschichten aus Movenna. Nittendorf: Wurdack Publishing, 2004. ISBN 3-938065-00-1
- Ein Prinz für Movenna. Nittendorf: Wurdack, 2007. ISBN 3-938065-24-9
- Zwischen Barrikade, Burgtheater und Beamtenpension. Die jungdeutschen Autoren nach 1835. Stuttgart: ibidem, 2009. ISBN 3-89821-958-5
- Darthula, Tochter der Nebel. Dortmund: Arcanum-Fantasy-Publishing, 2010. ISBN 978-3-939139-32-4
- Der Fels der schwarzen Götter. Nittendorf: Wurdack, 2010. ISBN 978-3-938065-64-8
- Die letzte Falkin. Dortmund: Arcanum-Fantasy-Publishing, 2010. ISBN 978-3-939139-62-1
- Die Schlagzeile. Munic: PersonalNovel, 2011.
- Das Serum des Doctor Nikola. Nittendorf: Wurdack, 2013. ISBN 978-3-938065-92-1
- Nestis und die verschwundene Seepocke. Hildesheim: Verlag Monika Fuchs, 2013. ISBN 978-3940078643
- Nestis und die Hafenpiraten. Hildesheim: Verlag Monika Fuchs, 2014. ISBN 978-3940078841.
- Hut ab, Hödeken! Sagen aus dem Hildesheimer Land. Verlag Monika Fuchs, Hildesheim 2015, ISBN 978-3-940078-37-7.
- Freiheitsschwingen. PersonalNovel, München 2015.
- Timur. Saphir im Stahl, Bickenbach 2015, ISBN 978-3-943948-54-7.
- Vom Feuervogel. TES, Erfurt 2015.
- Berthold von Holle: Crane. Ein Ritter-Epos, nacherzählt von Petra Hartmann. Verlag Monika Fuchs, Hildesheim 2016. ISBN 978-3-940078-48-3.
- Berthold von Holle: Demantin. Ein Ritter-Epos, nacherzählt von Petra Hartmann. Verlag Monika Fuchs, Hildesheim 2016. ISBN 978-3-940078-34-6.
- Nestis und die verbotene Welle. Verlag Monika Fuchs, Hildesheim, 2017. ISBN 978-3-947066-00-1
- Nestis und der Weihnachtssand. Verlag Monika Fuchs, Hildesheim, 2017. ISBN 978-3-947066-12-4
- Falkenblut. Hottenstein Verlag, Sibbesse, 2020. ISBN 978-3935928991
- Das Herz des Donnervogels. Blitz-Verlag, 2023.
- Das intergalaktische Bestiarium. Neustadt in Sachsen: Edition Dunkelgestirn, 2025.

=== E-books ===
- Falkenfrühling. Dortmund: Arcanum, 2011. ISBN 978-3-939139-59-1
- Die Schlagzeile. Munic: PersonalNovel, 2012
- Falkenblut. Saarbrücken: satzweiss.com - chichili agency, 2012. ISBN 3-8450-0753-2, ISBN 9783845007533
- Nestis und der Weihnachtssand. Ein Helgoland-Märchen. Hildesheim: Verlag Monika Fuchs, 2013. ISBN 978-3-940078-71-1
- Beim Vorderhuf meines Pferdes. Neue Geschichten aus Movenna. Nittendorf: Wurdack-Verlag, 2014. ISBN 9783955560812

=== Audiobooks ===
- Weihnachten im Schneeland. Essen: Action Publishing, 2010.
- Der Fels der schwarzen Götter. Essen: Action-Publishing, 2012.
- Hut ab, Hödeken! Sagen aus dem Hildesheimer Land. Verlag Monika Fuchs, Hildesheim 2016.

=== Editorship ===
- Drachenstarker Feenzauber. Nittendorf: Wurdack, 2007. ISBN 3-938065-28-1
- Wovon träumt der Mond?. Nittendorf: Wurdack, 2008. ISBN 978-3-938065-37-2
- Drachen! Drachen! Fiese Essenzen aus dreiundzwanzig Genres. Blitz Publishing, 2012. ISBN 978-3-89840-339-9
- Mit Klinge und Feder. Homburg/Saar: Ulrich Burger Publishing, 2013. ISBN 978-3-94337-807-8
- Autorenträume. Ein Lesebuch. Hildesheim: Monika Fuchs Publishing, 2013. ISBN 978-3940078537
- Blitzeis und Gänsebraten. Hildesheimer Weihnachtsgeschichten. Hildesheim: Monika Fuchs, 2014. ISBN 978-3-940078-57-5
- Zurück. Phantastische Geschichten. Norderstedt: Books on Demand, 2026. ISBN 978-3-696-35181-6
