= Verena Hartmann =

German politician

Member of the Bundestag
- Incumbent
- Assumed office 24 October 2017

Personal details
- Born: 29 March 1974 (age 52)
- Party: AfD

Verena Hartmann (born 29 March 1974 in Räckelwitz, Bezirk Dresden, East Germany) is a German politician formerly of the Alternative for Germany (AfD) party, and since 2017, a member of the Bundestag, the federal legislative body.

== Life and politics ==
Hartmann was born 1974 in Räckelwitz in Upper Lusatia, then in the Bezirk Dresden of East Germany. She became a police commissioner in 2002.

Hartmann entered the AfD in 2016 and became after the 2017 German federal election member of the Bundestag.
