= Jutta Hartmann =

German academic (born 1963)

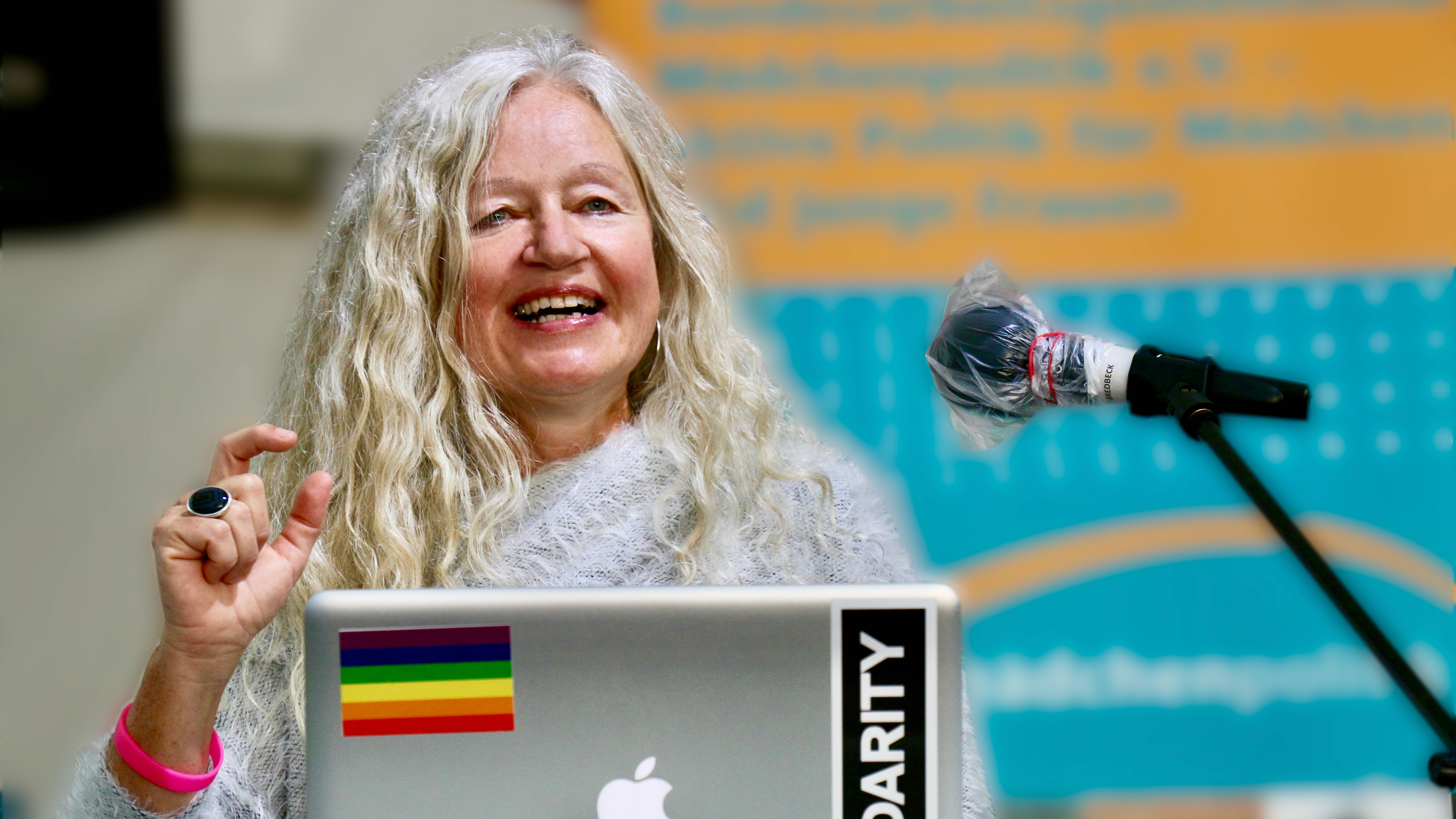
Jutta Hartmann in 2021

Jutta Hartmann (born 1963) is a German academic and professor of pedagogy and social work at Alice Salomon University of Applied Sciences Berlin. Her research interests include Gender, Queer, Diversity education and Educational science.

== Career ==
Jutta Hartmann initially studied Biology, German Studies and Geography as well as Pedagogy and Educational Psychology at the Reutlingen University of Education and graduated with a state examination for teaching at secondary schools. Hartmann then studied social pedagogy at the Technische Universität Berlin and graduated with a degree in education. She was awarded her degree in 2000 with a thesis on Dynamizations in the Triad Gender – Sexuality – Life Form. Critical-deconstructive impulses for pedagogy. In her transdisciplinary and discourse-analytical dissertation, she developed the critical-deconstructive approach of a pedagogy of diverse lifestyles, which she has continued to develop ever since.

From 1990 to 2000, Jutta Hartmann was a scientific assistant in the Department of Education and Teaching Sciences at Technische Universität Berlin and a lecturer at the universities of Graz and [[University of Innsbruck]Innsbruck]].

From 2001 to 2002, she was an education officer at the Jagdschloss Glienicke international meeting place for youth and adult education in Jagdschloss Glienicke Berlin and from 2002 to 2005 she was a visiting professor at the Institute for Educational Sciences at the University of Innsbruck. From 2006 to 2010, she headed the Continuing Education division of the umbrella organization of professional victim support institutions Arbeitskreis der Opferhilfe in Deutschland e.V. and represented the professorship Pedagogy and Social Work at the Hochschule für angewandte Wissenschaft und Kunst Hildesheim (HAWK). At the same time, she taught from 2003 to 2013 as a lecturer at the Institute for Educational Science at the University of Vienna and from 2003 to 2018 in the postgraduate course Social Work as a Human Rights Profession – Master of Social Work, MRMA.

Jutta Hartmann has been Professor of General Education and Social Work at the Alice Salomon University of Applied Sciences Berlin since 2010.

=== Research and teaching ===
Jutta Hartmann dedicates her research and publications to the further development of critical-deconstructive perspectives in pedagogy, queer education, projects on sexual education and questions of professionalization.

In terms of content and theory, she has positioned herself in critical educational science by engaging with feminist and post-structural ways of thinking in a critical-deconstructive pedagogy of diversity. She teaches in the areas of critical pedagogy, educational and socialization processes, gender studies, discourse analysis and evaluation research and is active on several scientific advisory boards.

Hartmann led the practical research project VieL*Bar – Diverse gender and sexual lifestyles in educational work – didactic potentials and challenges of museum educational approaches from 2016 to 2018.

Jutta Hartmann is leading the Practical research project JupP* – Boys' education and prevention of sexualized violence – potentials and challenges of masculinity-related youth work, sexual education, prevention of sexualized violence and queer education (2018–2021) in cooperation with the Berlin-based Institut Dissens. She focuses on the topics of sexual education and queer education. The aim is to improve the prevention of sexualized violence against children and young people who see themselves as male. To this end, prevention-related aspects in the pedagogical offers of the four fields of practice mentioned are worked out and further developed in a joint reflection process. This resulted in the explanatory film Sexualized violence against boys* – It's never ok! It's never ok! Is' so!

Jutta Hartmann teaches pedagogical principles of social work as well as educational theories, sexual pedagogy, gender and queer studies. She leads the certificate course Professional Victim Support at the ASH Berlin's continuing education center, is active on several scientific advisory boards and is the second spokesperson for the Working Group of Women's and Gender Research Institutions at Berlin Universities.
