= Paul Leon Hartman =

American experimental physicist

Paul Leon Hartman (13 July 1913, Reno, Nevada – 20 May 2005, Ithaca, New York) was an American experimental physicist, known for making pioneering measurements of synchrotron radiation.

== Biography ==
Hartman graduated in 1934 from the University of Nevada with a B.S. in electrical engineering and in 1938 from Cornell University with a Ph.D. in physics. His thesis advisor was Lloyd P. Smith (1904–1988). Hartman was a physics instructor at Cornell for the academic year 1938–1939. From 1939 to 1946 he worked at Bell Telephone Laboratories. During WW II he worked with James Brown Fisk and Homer D. Hagstrum in the development of centimeter-wave generators for airborne radar. Hartman was a faculty member in the physics department of Cornell University from 1946 to 1983, when he retired as professor emeritus. He held a joint appointment in Cornell's department of physics engineering (which was renamed the "School of Applied and Engineering Physics"). From 1971 to 1973 he was the associate director of Cornell's School of Applied and Engineering Physics.

Paul’s research focused on UV physics, especially photoemission from ionic crystals and the production of excitons. Yet he was perhaps best known for his early investigation, with colleague Diran Tomboulian, of the far-UV spectrum of synchrotron radiation emitted by relativistic electrons in circular orbits. The measurements were performed on the 300-MeV synchrotron at Cornell using a vacuum-UV spectrograph to record the intensity from 5 nm to 40 nm without intervening windows. The results were far-reaching, not only in con- firming the predictions of Julian Schwinger for the spectrum in the far-UV and soft x-ray region, but also in demonstrating the potential of synchrotron radiation as a broadband x-ray and UV source.

Along with his work on synchrotron radiation, Hartman studied far ultraviolet radiation, optics and the solid state physics. He spent three sabbatical leaves and many summers at Los Alamos Scientific Laboratory, studying the light induced by electron bombardment of the atmosphere.

He was elected a Fellow of the American Physical Society in 1972. He helped to establish the Cornell High-Energy Synchrotron Source (CHESS).

Upon his death he was survived by his widow, three daughters, two grandchildren, and four great-grandchildren.

== Selected publications ==
=== Articles ===
- Smith, Lloyd P.; Hartman, Paul L. (1940). "The Formation and Maintenance of Electron and Ion Beams". Journal of Applied Physics. 11 (3): 220–229. Bibcode:1940JAP....11..220S. doi:10.1063/1.1712760.
- Tomboulian, D. H.; Hartman, P. L. (1956). "Spectral and Angular Distribution of Ultraviolet Radiation from the 300-Mev Cornell Synchrotron". Physical Review. 102 (6): 1423–1447. Bibcode:1956PhRv..102.1423T. doi:10.1103/PhysRev.102.1423.
- Hartman, P. L. (1961). "Improvements in a Source for Use in the Vacuum Ultraviolet". Journal of the Optical Society of America. 51 (1): 113. Bibcode:1961JOSA...51..113H. doi:10.1364/JOSA.51.000113.
- Hartman, Paul L. (1965). "Advanced Physics Laboratory Course at Cornell". American Journal of Physics. 33 (10): 776–783. Bibcode:1965AmJPh..33..776H. doi:10.1119/1.1970984.
- Hartman, P.L. (1982). "Introductory remarks". Nuclear Instruments and Methods in Physics Research. 195 (1–2): 1–6. Bibcode:1982NIMPR.195....1H. doi:10.1016/0029-554X(82)90749-2.

=== Books ===
- The Cornell Physics Department: Recollections and a History of Sorts. 1982; revised 1993, reprinted 1994; 359 pages; online pdf
- A Memoir on The Physical Review: A history of the first hundred years. American Institute of Physics. 1994. ISBN 1-56396-282-9.
