= Peter G. Hartman =

English-German biochemist

Peter George Hartman (* 1947 in Brno, former Czechoslovakia) is an English-German biochemist who made fundamental contributions in the field of pharmaceutical research to chemotherapy. He was also involved in the EU Biofector project as a team member.

== Life and work ==
Hartman grew up in the UK and attended school in Portsmouth. He then went on to study natural sciences with a focus on chemistry at Merton College in Oxford with an MA and then a research stay at the Polytechnic University in Portsmouth. With the dissertation: The Structure of the Lysine-Rich Histone H1: an NMR Study Hartman received his PhD.

This was followed by stays as a postdoc at the Max Planck Institute in Tübingen and in the Biozentrum of the University of Basel. His 25 years of research at F. Hofmann-La Roche in Basel on anti-fungal and ant-bacterial chemotherapy, cardiovascular diseases and diabetes led to current forms of therapy. Since his retirement, he has made his experience and specialist language knowledge available as a translator of specialist publications in EU projects.

Peter Hartman lives with his wife Brigitte in Lörrach (Germany)

== Publications (selection) ==
- J. Allan, P. G. Hartman, C. Crane-Robinson & F. X. Aviles: The structure and function of histone H1 and its location in chromatin Nature, Vol. 288, No. 5792, pp. 675–679, 1980
- P. G. Hartman and D. Sanglard Inhibitors of Ergosterol Biosynthesis as Antifungal Agents Current Pharmaceutical Design, 1997, 3, pp. 177–208
- Peter G. Hartman, George, E. Chapman, Thomas Moss and E. Morton Bradbury Studies on the Role and Mode of Operation of the Very-Lysine-Rich Histone H1 in Eukaryote Chromatin Eur. J. Biochem. 77, 45-51, (1977)
- E. M. Bradbury, P. D. Cary, C. Crane-Robinson and P. G. Hartman Nuclear Magnetic Resonance of Synthetic Polypeptides Pure and Applied Chemistry, Vol 36, 1973, pp. 53–92
- George E. Chapman, Peter G. Hartman, Peter D. Cary, Morton E. Bradbury and David R. Lee An NMR Study of the Globular Structure of the Histone H1 Eur. J. Biochem. Vol. 86, pp. 35–44 (1978)
- A. Polak and P. G. Hartman Antifungal Chemotherapy – Are We Winning? Progress in Drug Research, 1991, pp. 181–269
- P. G. Hartman Molecular Aspects and Mechanism of Action of Dihydrofolate Reductase Inhibitors Journal of Chemotherapy 1993, Vol. 5, No. 6, pp. 369–376
- E. M. Bradbury, C. Crane-Robinson and P. G. Hartman Effect of Polydispersity on the nmr spectra of poly(gamma-benzyl-L-glutamate) through the helix to coil transition Polymer, 1973, Vol. 14, pp. 543–548
