= André Frédéric Hartmann =

French manufacturer and politician (1772–1861)

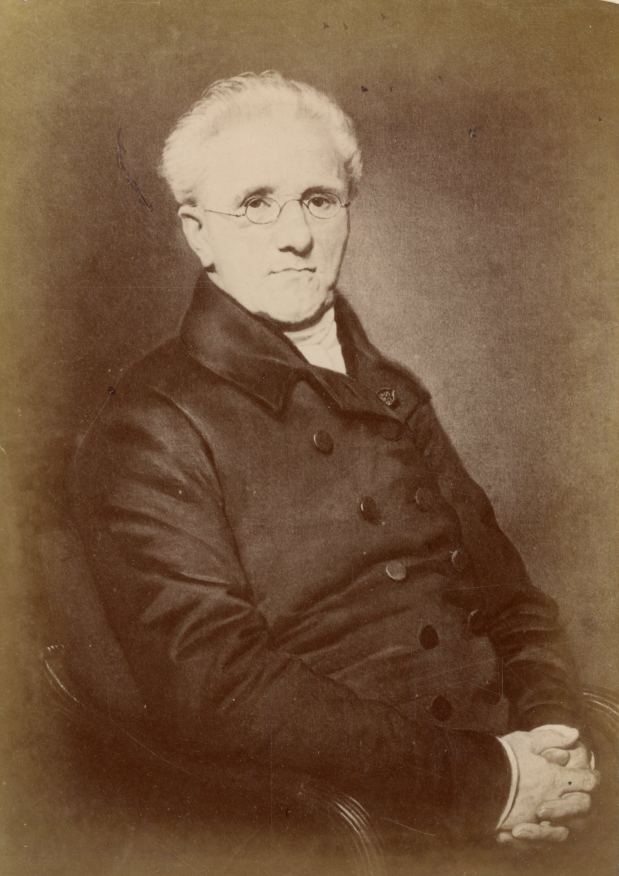
- Born: 19 October 1772
- Died: 1 May 1861
- Father: André Hartmann
- Awards: Officer of the Legion of Honor (1844); Chevalier of the Legion of Honour (1831)

André Frédéric Hartmann (19 October 1772 – 1 May 1861) was a French manufacturer and politician.

== Life and career ==
Hartmann was born in 1772 in Colmar, in the Haut-Rhin department in northeastern France.

He was the general councillor of Haut-Rhin and a deputy from Haut-Rhin at the Chamber of Deputies from 1830 to 1845, seating within the majority backing the July Monarchy. He was a Peer of France between 1845 and 1848.

He was made an officier of the Legion of Honour in 1844.

He died in 1861 in Munster, Haut-Rhin at the age of 88.
