= Kenneth E. Hartman =

American writer and prison activist

Kenneth E. Hartman (born December 28, 1960) is an American writer and prison activist. In 1980, Hartman was convicted of murder at the age of 19 for beating a 44-year-old homeless man named Thomas Allen Fellowes to death in Ramona Park in Long Beach, California, and he was sentenced to life in prison without parole. While in prison, Hartman became known as a prisoner-rights advocate, and on April 15, 2017, Hartman was one of 2 prisoners to have their lifetime sentences commuted by Governor Jerry Brown. Hartman was released from prison in December 2017.

Hartman was one of the proponents of the "Honor Yard" in California State Prison in Lancaster; the program involves "600 inmates who have promised to avoid drugs, gang activity and violence against each other or prison staff and who live in a section of the prison separated from the general inmates" where they may take training and classes. Hartman wrote about his experiences in prison and this program in his essay "A Prisoners' Purpose". In a 2009 New York Times editorial, he described the effects of the recession on the prison system. He has also written against the penalty of life imprisonment without parole, calling it "the other death penalty". In a December 2014 feature for Harper's Magazine, he described three decades of prison Christmases to illustrate the progressive attempts to dehumanize prisoners in the United States.

His 2009 memoir is Mother California: A Story of Redemption Behind Bars (ISBN 0692358331).
