= Sieglinde Hartmann =

German medievalist (born 1954)

- Born: 1954 (age 70–71); Wuppertal, Germany
- Citizenship: German
- Education: Johann Wolfgang Goethe-University
- Occupation(s): Medievalist, Professor, Researcher
- Employer(s): University of Graz, Universities of Paris IV
- Organization: Member of the Programming Committee of the International Medieval Congress
- Known for: Acting president of the Oswald von Wolkenstein-Gesellschaft, Editor-in-chief of the Jahrbuch der Oswald von Wolkenstein-Gesellschaft (JOWG)

Sieglinde Hartmann (born 1954 in Wuppertal, Germany) is a German medievalist, expert on the medieval poet Oswald von Wolkenstein and president of the Oswald von Wolkenstein-Gesellschaft.

== Biography ==
Sieglinde Hartmann studied in Cologne and Frankfurt am Main. She received her Ph.D. at the Johann Wolfgang Goethe-University, Frankfurt am Main, Germany with a study on age reflection and self-portrayal in Oswald von Wolkenstein's oeuvre. She has been visiting professor at the University of Graz (Austria), as well as lecturer at the Universities of Paris IV (Sorbonne - France), Mainz (Germany), Gießen (Germany), Kassel (Germany), Bamberg, and the J.W. Goethe-University in Frankfurt (Germany). In 2003, Sieglinde Hartmann was appointed to a professorship for Medieval German literature at the University of Würzburg. An important element in Sieglinde Hartmann's research approach is the international networking regarding German Medieval studies. In this context she was appointed professor for German philology at the Baku Slavic University, Azerbaijan.

As researcher, she mainly focuses on Medieval German literature, especially Oswald von Wolkenstein (ca. 1376/77-1445), a widely travelled knight, considered to be the most important German composer and poet of the Late Middle Ages. Since Wolkenstein’s work is closely connected with the culture of the other European countries of his time, Hartmann has developed a special comparative approach combining methods from the fields of literary studies, history, intellectual history, and art history to enrich, e.g., her textual analysis. Thus her new approach opens up paths to a contextual understanding of Wolkenstein’s genius within other cultural phenomena of the ‘Waning Middle Ages’. An important element in Sieglinde Hartmann's work regarding Wolkenstein is also the organization and presentation of Medieval concerts, often in cooperation with the Austrian musician Eberhard Kummer.

Since 2002, Sieglinde Hartmann has been a Member of the Programming Committee of the International Medieval Congress organized every year by the Institute for Medieval Studies at the University of Leeds, Great Britain, responsible for comparative studies and German philology.

Because of her deep involvement in research on Oswald von Wolkenstein, Sieglinde Hartmann is a founding member and since 2007 the acting president of the Oswald von Wolkenstein-Gesellschaft, as well as editor-in-chief of the Jahrbuch der Oswald von Wolkenstein-Gesellschaft (JOWG).

== Research focus areas ==
- Oswald von Wolkenstein
- History of German literature in the high and late Middle Ages
- Medieval Reception
- The Nibelungenlied in the context of non-European heroic epics

== Publications (selection) ==
=== Studies regarding Oswald von Wolkenstein ===
- Heretical Hussites: Oswald Von Wolkenstein’s ‘Song Of Hell’ (‘Durch Toren Weis’). In: Heresy and the Making of European Culture. Medieval and Modern Perspectives. A. P. Roach and J. R. Simpson (eds.). Farnham: Ashgate 2013.
- Oswald von Wolkenstein. In: Kindlers Literatur-Lexikon. 3rd Edition, Stuttgart /Weimar 2009, Band 12.
- Jahrbuch der Oswald von Wolkenstein Gesellschaft. Edited with Ulrich Müller; from volume 7, Frankfurt am Main 1992/93 ff.
- Pourquoi traduire en français un auteur comme Oswald von Wolkenstein? Lausanne 2005.
- Oswald von Wolkenstein heute: Traditionen und Innovationen in seiner Lyrik. Frankfurt am Main 2005.
- Oswald von Wolkenstein: Es fügt sich, do ich was von zehen jaren alt. In: Gedichte und Interpretationen. Mittelalter. Stuttgart 1993.
- Zur Einheit des Marienliedes Kl 34. Eine Stilstudie mit Übersetzung und Kommentar. JOWG. Bd. 3, 1984/85.
- Altersdichtung und Selbstdarstellung bei Oswald von Wolkenstein. Göppingen, 1980.

=== Studies regarding European medieval literature and culture ===
- Deutsche Liebeslyrik vom Minnesang bis zu Oswald von Wolkenstein oder die Erfindung der Liebe im Mittelalter. Wiesbaden: Dr. L. Reichert Verlag 2012 (= Einführung in die deutsche Literatur des Mittelalters, Band 1).
- Islands and Cities in Medieval Myth, Literature, and History. Edited with A. Grafetstätter, J. Ogier. Frankfurt a. M. 2011.
- Das Nibelungenlied und Das Buch des Dede Korkut (Imagines Medii Aevi. Interdisziplinare Beiträge zur Mittelalterforschung). Edited with K. Abdullayev, H. Boeschoten, U. Störmer-Caysa. Wiesbaden 2011.
- Mittelalterliche Literatur und Kultur im Deutschordensstaat in Preußen: Leben und Nachleben. Edited with J. Wenta and G. Vollmann-Profe. Torun 2009.
- Fauna and Flora in the Middle Ages. Studies of the Medieval Environment and its Impact on the Human Mind. Frankfurt am Main 2007.
- Artus-Mythen und Moderne. Aspekte der Rezeption in Literatur, Kunst, Musik und in den Medien. Edited with T. Le Blanc, U. Müller, B. Twrsnick. Wetzlar 2005.
- Vom Mittelalter zum dritten Jahrtausend: Brauchen wir das Mittelalter für unsere Zukunft? In: JOWG. Bd. 13. 2001/2002.
- Harpyie. In: Mittelalter Mythen. Hrsg. von U. Müller und W. Wunderlich. Bd. 2. St. Gallen 1999.
- Ein empirischer Beitrag zur Geschichte des Lachens im Mittelalter: Lachen beim Stricker. In: MEDIAEVISTIK. 1990.
- Flaubert - ein Mystiker? Mittelalter und Mystik in den Trois Contes. In: Mittelalter-Rezeption II. Hrg. von J. Kühnel u.a. Göppingen 1982.
- Deutsch-Französische Germanistik. Edited with C. Lecouteux. Göppingen 1984.
