= John Hardman (businessman) =

John Hardman (born 8 October 1939) is a British businessman, and a former Managing Director and Chairman of Asda.

== Early life ==
He was born and grew up in Liverpool, the only son with six daughters. He attended the all-male grammar school Quarry Bank High School. He studied Economics at the University of Liverpool from 1959–62, gaining a BComm. He trained to be a chartered accountant.

== Career ==
=== RCA ===
He worked for RCA in America from 1966, looking after a USA plant making television tubes until 1973.

=== Asda ===
At Asda he was Finance Director from 1981 and Chief Operating Officer from 1983.

He became Managing Director in 1984, staying until 1991. He took the number of stores from 101 in 1985 to 204 in 1991. In 1985 Asda was the UK's third-largest supermarket chain.

In 1985 he brought in a new design of store, replacing the cream and brown colour scheme for apple green and orange. The entrance area would have concessionary stores.

He became Executive Chairman from January 1988 of Asda Group. He earned £231,000 in 1989.

He resigned as chairman on Monday 10 June 1991. Graham Stow, the chief executive of Asda Stores, also resigned. He was replaced as Chairman by Patrick Gillam in November 1991. The stores subsequently were run by the two managing directors.

He appeared in the Channel Five 2020 documentary Inside Asda: Bigger, Better, Cheaper?.
