= Carl Hartmann (footballer) =

German footballer

Personal information
- Date of birth: 8 February 1894
- Place of birth: Potsdam, Germany
- Date of death: 24 June 1943 (aged 49)
- Position: Forward

Senior career*
Years	Team	Apps	(Gls)
1911–1923	Union Potsdam		
1923–1928	Victoria Hamburg		

International career
1923–1924	Germany	4	(2)
- * Club domestic league appearances and goals

Carl Hartmann (8 February 1894 – 24 June 1943) was a German international footballer who played for Union Potsdam and Victoria Hamburg.
