= Carl Vilhelm Hartman =

Swedish botanist and anthropologist (1862–1941)

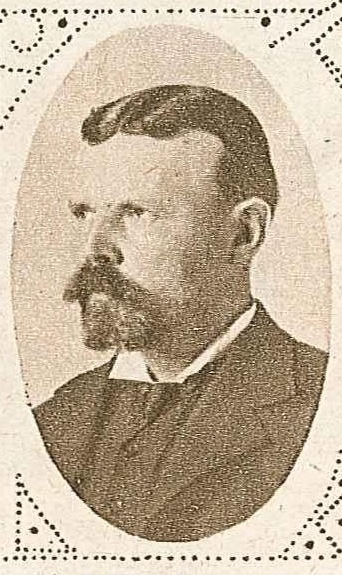
C. V. Hartman around 1916.

Carl Vilhelm Hartman (19 August 1862 – 19 June 1941), was a Swedish botanist and anthropologist.

Trained as a botanist, Hartman joined Norwegian ethnographer Carl Sofus Lumholtz on a three-year expedition to the Sierra Madre Mountains in Mexico. One of Hartman's duties was to conduct studies of plants used by the native population. Working alongside Lumholtz, his interest turned from botany to anthropology. After completion of his work in Mexico in 1893, Hartman accompanied Lumholtz to the World's Columbian Exposition in Chicago, spending six months organizing exhibits in its anthropological department. In 1894, he published an anthropological essay titled "The Indians of Northwestern Mexico".

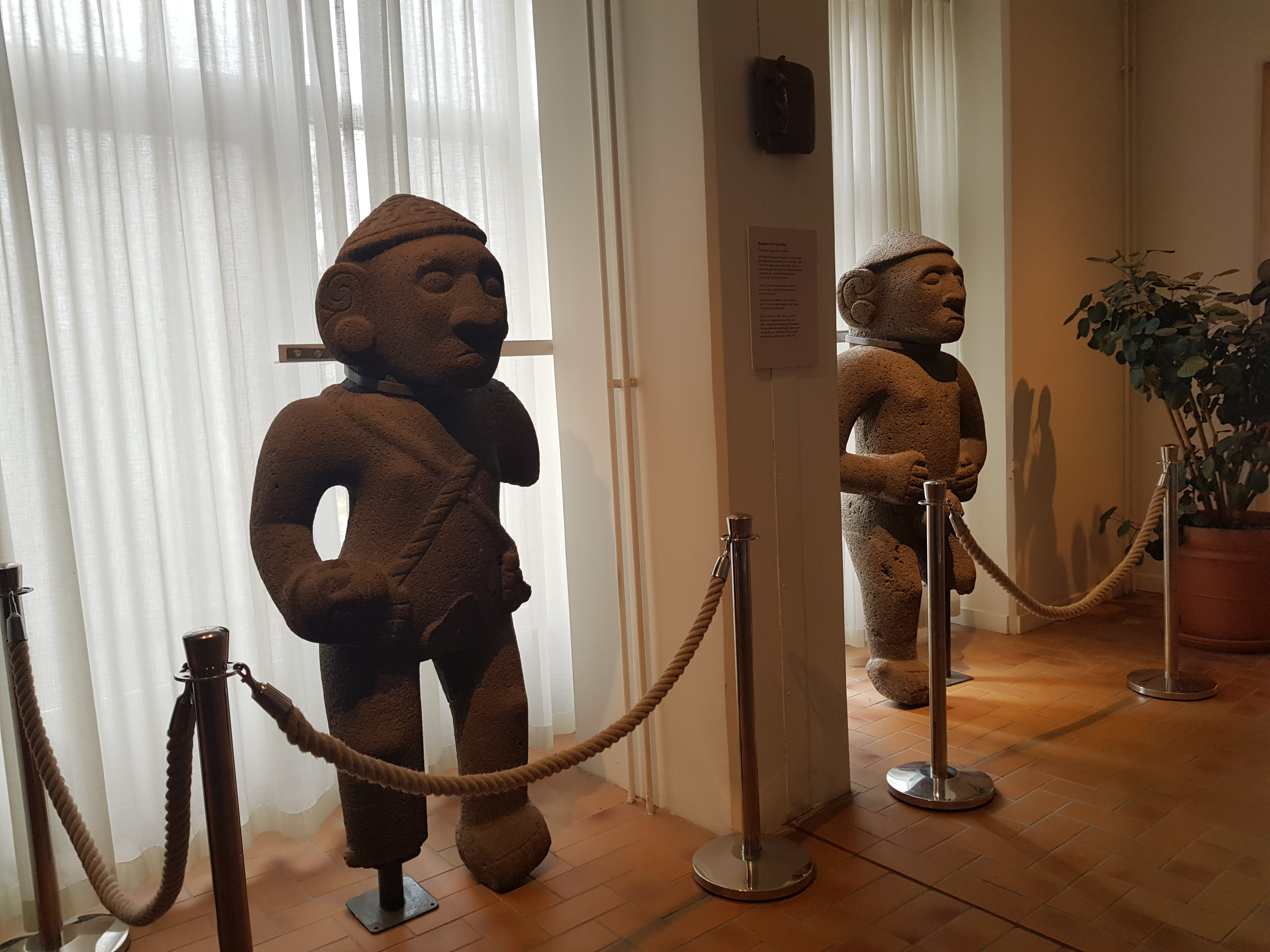
Stone figures from Costa Rica at the Museum of Ethnography, Stockholm. They were brought to Sweden by Carl Vilhelm Hartman.

From 1896 to 1898, Hartman led an anthropological expedition to the Central American states of Costa Rica, El Salvador and Guatemala. He conducted studies there in the fields of archaeology, ethnology, and anthropometry as well as anthropology. One of the sites he excavated was Las Mercedes. Returning to Sweden, he served as a curator at the Naturhistoriska riksmuseet in Stockholm. In 1901, Hartman published a monograph called "Archaeological Researches in Costa Rica". From 1908 to 1923, he was director of the ethnographical section of the museum.

Hartman died in Stockholm on 19 June 1941.

== Sources ==
- Anthropologist C.V Hartman
