= EARTH University =

University in Costa Rica

Coordinates: 10°12′04.48″N 83°36′21.60″W

- Universidad EARTH
- Type: Private
- Established: 1990
- President: Dr. Arturo Condo
- Vice-president: Yanine Chan
- Dean: Yanine Chan
- Students: +400
- Location: Guácimo, Limón, Costa Rica
- Website: www.earth.ac.cr

EARTH University (Spanish: Universidad EARTH, Escuela de Agricultura de la Región Tropical Húmeda) is a private, non-profit university that offers one program of study: an undergraduate licenciatura degree in agricultural sciences. The university invests in students – predominantly from Latin America, the Caribbean and Africa – working to become leaders of positive socio-economic and environmental change for their home countries and the world at large through a techno-scientific education emphasizing social entrepreneurship

== History ==
In the 1980s, EARTH University was developed through a partnership between a group of Costa Ricans, the United States Agency for International Development (USAID), the W. K. Kellogg Foundation and the Costa Rican Government. The cornerstone of the first campus building was laid on 2 April 1989, and after years of fundraising, campus planning and curriculum development, the first class was inaugurated on 16 March 1990. The first graduation ceremony was held in December 1993.

== Admissions and student body ==
Currently, EARTH has about 400 students enrolled from 41 different countries. 51 percent of the student body is women, and 81 percent is from rural communities. Each enrolling class comprises about 100 students chosen from about 1,300 applicants. Most students receive scholarships to cover all or part of the $29,000 tuition.

== Campus ==
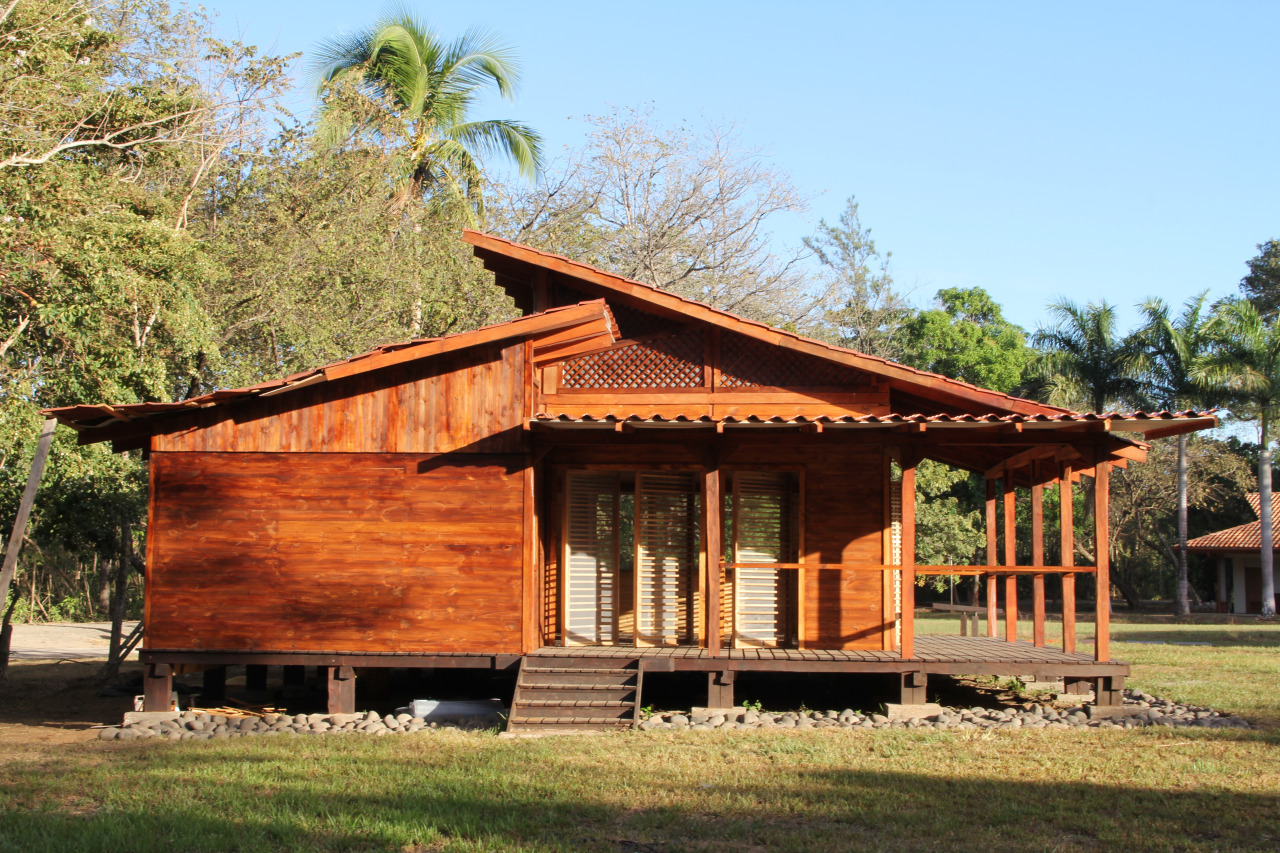
A classroom on EARTH University's secondary campus in La Flor, Guanacaste

The 52,981 m^{2} (570,280 sq ft) campus on a 33.76 km^{2} (8,340 acres) property in Guácimo includes educational facilities, a library specializing in agricultural and environmental topics, laboratories, a rainforest reserve with primary and secondary forests, and a farm dedicated to agricultural and cattle production. The second campus, EARTH-La Flor, was donated to the university in 2005 by the family of Daniel Oduber Quirós, a previous president of Costa Rica. EARTH-La Flor is 3,700 acres (15 km^{2}).

== Education ==
EARTH University approaches education based on two principles:

1. Student-centered: Students – individually and collectively – explore real challenges firsthand and become active participants in accumulating knowledge and generating understanding, as opposed to passively receiving information.
2. Experiential: Students are engaged in weekly field experiences, business operations, and a third-year international internship, allowing them to test and build upon the knowledge they have been acquiring.

== Tree planting ==
EARTH Plants the Future was a tree planting project organized by the university and its graduates as part of its twentieth anniversary celebration. They planned to plant at least 200,000 trees, including almond trees, espavé, mahogany or Guanacastes in more than 26 countries where its alumni reside for World Environment Day on 5 June 2010.
