= John Hartmann =

Prussian brass composer

- Born: October 24, 1830; Auleben, Prussia
- Died: 1897 (aged 66–67); Liverpool, England
- Occupation: brass composer
- Known for: playing cornet
- Notable work: see Compositions

John Hartmann (October 24, 1830 – 1897) was a Prussian brass composer. He is notable for having served Prince George, Duke of Cambridge as bandmaster in the British 4th Regiment, 12th Lancers.

Hartmann was born in Auleben. When he went to fulfil his mandatory service obligation to the Prussian military, he chose to be a musician. Doing that gave him the option of choosing the regiment he would serve with. He chose to serve with the Cuirassiers in Cologne. While with the Cuirassiers, he played solo cornet and violin. In 1854, his bandmaster, Herr Schallehn, left service and traveled to England, joining the Crystal Palace Company. Hartmann joined him when his service was over in October 1855. John's brother Ernest also joined Schallehn (prior to John).

Hartmann continued to play cornet in the Crystal Palace Band until he was offered the position of bandmaster of the Tyrone Militia at Sheffield. He served with them, with the 1st (King's) Dragoon Guards, and with the Royal Sherwood Foresters (Nottingham Militia), who were "one of the best brass bands in the country." He organized the band of the 2nd Battalion of the (King's Own) 4th Foot at Chichester. He served with the 4th Foot Guards in Corfu, and the 12th Lancers at Hounslow for four years (turning it from a mediocre band to a professional band).

While serving with the 12th Lancers, Hartmann was invited with his regiment to serve the Duke of Cambridge in Aldershot, Leeds, and Manchester. He did this until a requirement to be enlisted in the military forced him to choose to end his career.

Afterwards he returned to Germany, and not liking it, retired again in the UK, doing compositions and arrangements of music for British publishing companies. He died in Liverpool.

== Compositions ==
=== Instrumental solos ===
(cornet solos unless noted)

- Alexis (Fischer,1883) (unpublished, arr. H. Higgins)
- Arbucklenian Polka (Bovaco) (Fischer, 1912)
- Auld Lang Syne, grand fantasy (Bovaco, arr. H. Prendiville) (Fischer, 1889)
- The Champion, grand fantasy (Fischer, 1891, arr. P. DeVille)
- Columbia Polka
- The Conquering Hero, grand fantasy (Fischer, 1889)
- DeBereit's 6th Air Varie, (Fischer, arr. P. DeVille)
- DeBereit's 7th Air Varie, (Fischer, arr. P. DeVille)
- Facilita (Boosey & Hawkes, arr. T.C. Brown) (Fischer, 1900, arr. L.P. Laurendean)
- The Favourite (Bovaco, arr. F. Beyer) h. (Fischer, 1000)
- La Belle Americaine (cornet or euphonium solo)
- Lizzie Polka (Fischer, 1912) (Hawkes)
- Longing for Home (Fischer, 1922)
- Mia, grand fantasy, (Fischer, 1895)
- My Old Kentucky Home
- New Star Polka (Fischer, 1887)
- Pretty Jane, grand fantasy (Fischer, 1889, arr. H. Prendiville)
- The Return, air vane (Molenaur, arr. G. MOI)
- Rule Britania, cornet solo
- See the Conquering Hero
- Sehnsucht, euphonium solo
- Silver King Polka (Fischer, 1887)
- Skirmish Polka (Fischer, 1905)
- Tom Bowling, grand fantasy, (Ftscher, 1891, arr. P. DeVille)
- Una, concert polka (Fischer, 1891)
- Weher's Last Waltz, variations (Bovaco, arr. P. DeVille) (Fischer, 1903) (Kalmus)
- The West Brighton (Fischer, 1883)

=== Other works ===
- A Battle Scene, fantasy (LaFleur, Journal 90)
- The Chanticlears, humorous serenade (Hawkes, Journal 149)
- Maid of Athens, troop (Boosey)
- A Night in Berlin, medley (Fischer, 1883, arr. M. Meyrelles)
- Two Mexican Dances (Hawkes, Journal 143)
