= Carl Johan Hartman =

Swedish botanist (1790–1849)

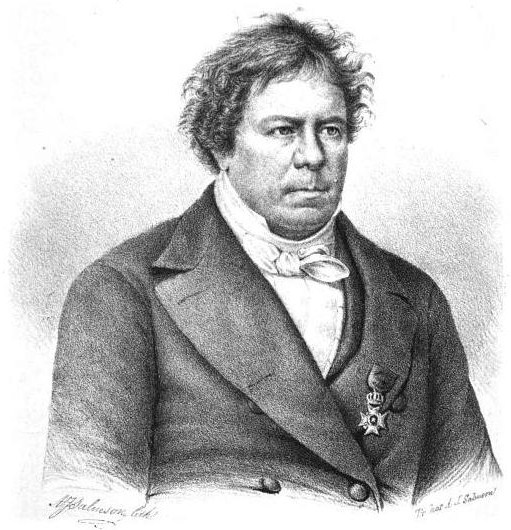
Carl Johan Hartman

Carl Johan Hartman (14 April 1790 in Gävle – 28 August 1849 in Stockholm) was a Swedish medical doctor and botanist.

== Works ==
- Handbok i Skandinaviens flora, 1820, 11. Auflage 1879 (spätere Auflagen von seinem Sohn herausgegeben)
- Utkast till botanologien, 1843
- Svensk och norsk excusionsflora, 1846
- Utkast till populär naturkunnighet 1836
- Husläkaren, 1828, 6. Auflage herausgegeben von O. F. Hallin 1872
