= Hartmann (disambiguation) =

Hartmann is a surname and given name.

Hartmann may also refer to:

== Places ==
- Hartmann (crater) (Hartmann Crater), Farside, Moon; an impact crater
- 3341 Hartmann (Asteroid Hartmann), a Main-Belt asteroid

=== Facilities and structures ===
- Hartmann House Preparatory School, Harare, Zimbabwe
- Hartmann College, Izzatnagar, Bareilly, India
- Hartmann Center for the Performing Arts, Peoria, Illinois, USA

== Groups, companies, organizations ==
- Hartmann Aircraft Corporation, manufacturer of the Hartmann OW-5M
- Hartmann Group, German medical and care product company
- Hartmann Luggage, Milwaukee, Wisconsin, USA; a leather goods manufacturer
- Hartmann Music, a musical equipment manufacturer

== Other uses ==
- Hartmann pipelines on the VM/CMS operating system
- Hartmann's operation, a surgical procedure
- Hartmann's Solution, a solution for intravenous administration

== See also ==
- S v Hartmann (1975), a South African court case
- Hartmann number (Ha), ratio of electromagnetic force to viscous force
- Hartmann Neuron, innovative synthesizer
- Meyer and Hartmann reaction in chemistry
- Hartmann mask, a telescope focusing tool
- Brødrene Hartmann, a Danish public corporation
- Hartman (disambiguation)
- Hardman (disambiguation)
