= Hartman (disambiguation) =

Hartman is a surname

Hartman may also refer to:

== Places ==
- Hartman, Arkansas, USA; a city in Johnson County
- Hartman, Colorado, USA; a town in Prowers County
- Hartman, Texas, USA; a ghost town in Bowie County
- Hartman Creek, Butler County, Missouri, USA; a creek
- Hartman Creek State Park, Wisconsin, USA

=== Facilities and structures ===
- Hartman Arena, Park City, Kansas, US
- Hartman Building and Theater, Columbus, Ohio, US
- Hartman Cider Press, Pike Township, Birks County, Pennsylvania, US; an NRHP-listed site
- Hartman Elementary School (disambiguation)
- Hartman High School, Jerusalem, Israel
- Hartman Hotel, Columbus, Ohio, US; a condo complex and former hotel
- Hartman Place, Fairfield County, Ohio, US; a reputedly haunted house
- Hartman Prehistoric Garden, Zilker Botanical Garden, Austin, Texas, US
- Hartman Reserve Nature Center, Cedar Falls, Iowa, US
- Hartman Stock Farm Historic District, Columbus, Ohio, US; a formerly NRHP-listed site
- Alison Hartman Gardens, Albany, Great Southern Region, Western Australia, Australia
- George Hartman House, East Pikeland Township, Chester County, Pennsylvania, US; an NRHP-listed building
- Fred Hartman Bridge, Houston Ship Channel, Texas, US
- William Hartman Farmstead, North Dansville, New York, US, an NRHP-listed site

== Other uses ==
- The Hartmans (TV series), a 1949 U.S. sitcom
- Hartman Personality Profile
- Hartman monoplane, a 1910 aeroplane

== See also ==
- Hartman effect, in quantum physics
- Hartman v. Moore (2006), a U.S. Supreme Court Case about retaliatory prosecution
- Hartman Ikarus, a 1959 UK human-powered ornithopter
- Hartmann (disambiguation)
- Hardman (disambiguation)
