= List of botanical gardens and arboretums in Texas =

This list of botanical gardens and arboretums in Texas is intended to include all significant botanical gardens and arboretums in the U.S. state of Texas

Name	Image	Affiliation	City
Amarillo Botanical Gardens			Amarillo
D. A. "Andy" Anderson Arboretum (Originally named Brazos County Arboretum)			College Station
Beaumont Botanical Gardens			Beaumont
Carleen Bright Arboretum			Woodway
Chihuahuan Desert Nature Center and Botanical Gardens			Fort Davis
Dallas Arboretum and Botanical Garden			Dallas
East Texas Arboretum and Botanical Society			Athens
Fort Worth Botanic Garden			Fort Worth
Houston Arboretum and Nature Center			Houston
Houston Botanic Garden			Houston
John Henry Kirby State Forest		Tyler County	
Lady Bird Johnson Wildflower Center			Austin
Lubbock Memorial Arboretum			Lubbock
Lynn R. Lowrey Arboretum		Rice University	Houston
Mast Arboretum		Stephen F. Austin State University	Nacogdoches
McAllen Botanical Gardens			McAllen
Mercer Botanic Gardens			Humble
Ruth Bowling Nichols Arboretum			Cherokee County
Olive Scott Petty Arboretum			Hardin County
Riverside Nature Center			Kerrville
San Antonio Botanical Garden			San Antonio
Shangri La Botanical Gardens and Nature Center			Orange
South Texas Botanical Gardens & Nature Center			Corpus Christi
Umlauf Sculpture Garden and Museum			Austin
Zilker Botanical Garden			Austin

== See also ==
- List of botanical gardens and arboretums in the United States
