= ELM Denmark =

Sustainable development committee

ELM Denmark was an environmental and sustainable development committee formed in August 1991 by a group of Danish corporations. The formation of the committee was led by Brødrene Hartmann A/S and involved the Danish National Railways, InvestMiljø, Danapak, and other key Danish companies.

== Bibliography ==
- Callenbach, Ernest; et al. (1993). EcoManagement: The Elmwood Guide to Ecological Auditing and Sustainable Business. San Francisco, California: Berrett-Koehler Publishers.
