= Clarke v Hurst =

South African legal case

Clarke v Hurst NO and Others is an important case in South African law, with significant ramifications for the legal status of euthanasia. It was heard and decided by Thirion J in the Durban and Coast Local Division on July 30, 1992, and is distinguished from S v Hartmann not only in that it was a civil rather than a criminal matter, but also by the court's divergent finding.

== Facts ==
Dr Frederick Cyril Clarke was a life member of the SA Voluntary Euthanasia Society. In 1988, he suffered cardiac arrest and was reduced to a vegetative state. Dr Clarke had signed a living will, requesting of his family and physician that, in the event of there being no reasonable expectation of his recovery from an extreme physical or mental disability, he be allowed to die rather than live by artificial means. His wife duly applied to be appointed his curatrix personae, with the power, even were this to result in his death, to authorise the discontinuance of his treatment.

The Attorney-General opposed the application, arguing that Mrs Clarke was effectively asking for a declaratory order to end a life, and declined to undertake not to prosecute if this should transpire.

== Judgment ==
The court determined that "it is but right" that Mrs Clarke should have the legal position on this matter determined by a court, "which can view the evidence dispassionately and objectively." It weighed with the judge that Dr Clarke was himself a strong proponent of euthanasia; as to the question of whether or not the discontinuance of artificial feeding (and the likely resultant death) would be unlawful, Thirion had to determine whether or not it was reasonable, judged by the boni mores of society.

This question he found to be contingent on the quality of life which remained to the patient. In this regard, it was notable that, although Dr Clarke was still alive and his death was not imminent, his brain had "permanently lost the capacity to induce a physical and mental existence at a level which qualifies as human life." It was clear, in light of this, that the feeding of the patient did not serve the purpose of supporting human life (as judged by the legal convictions of the society), and that "the applicant, if appointed as curatrix, would act reasonably and would be justified in discontinuing the artificial feeding and would therefore not be acting wrongfully if she were to do so," even if death were to ensue.

Although "her conduct would not be justifiable in law on any of the grounds of justification ('regverdigingsgronde')," it was not necessary that Mrs Clarke's actions fit neatly into one of the established grounds of justification; rather, the concept of wrongfulness had itself to be examined. If the legal convictions of the society did not regard such actions as wrongful, they could not be wrongful in law; and it was no obstacle to this reasoning that legal convictions are very often shaped by moral convictions. "The distinction between what is wrong and what is right," Thirion noted, "cannot always be drawn according to logic. Logic does not dictate the formation of society's legal or moral convictions." He added that "law is but a translation of society's fundamental values into policies and prescripts for regulating its members' conduct."

The application was therefore granted, and the court ordered that Mrs Clarke would not be acting wrongfully or unlawfully

1. "if she authorises or directs the discontinuance of the naso-gastric or any other non-natural feeding regime for the J patient"; and/or
2. "if she withholds agreement to medical or surgical treatment of the patient save such treatment as may seem to her appropriate for the comfort of the patient."
