= Rhodes piano =

Electric piano

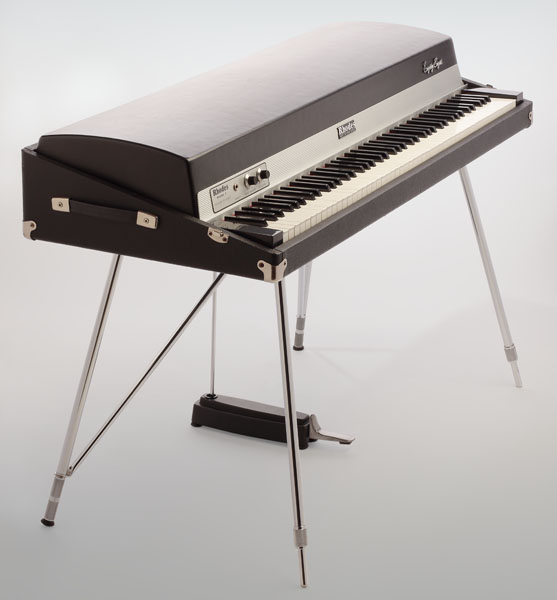
- The 88-key Rhodes MkI Stage Piano
- Manufacturer: Harold Rhodes (1946–59); Fender Electric Instrument Company (1959–65); CBS (1965–83); William Schultz (1983–87); Roland Corporation (1987–91); Rhodes Music Corporation (1997–2021); Rhodes Music Group Ltd (2021–present)
- Dates: 1946 ("Pre piano"); 1959 (Piano bass); 1965 (Fender Rhodes Electric Piano); 1970 (MkI "suitcase"); 1970 (MkI "Stage"); 1979 (MkII); 1984 (Mk V); 1987 (Roland Rhodes MK 80); 2007 (Mark 7); 2021 (Mark 8)

Technical specifications
- Polyphony: Full
- Oscillator: Induced current from a pickup
- Synthesis type: Electromechanical
- Effects: Tremolo, stereo auto-pan

Input/output
- Keyboard: 54, 73 or 88 keys
- External control: Line out or DIN connector to external amp /mixing board Sustain pedal

The Rhodes piano (also known as the Fender Rhodes piano) is an electric piano invented by Harold Rhodes, which became popular in the 1970s. Like a conventional piano, the Rhodes generates sound with keys and hammers, but instead of strings, the hammers strike thin metal tines, which vibrate next to an electromagnetic pickup. The signal is sent through a cable to an external keyboard amplifier and speaker.

The piano evolved from Rhodes's attempt to manufacture pianos while teaching recovering soldiers during World War II. Development continued after the war and into the following decade. In 1959, Fender began marketing the Piano Bass, a cut-down version; the full-size instrument did not appear until after Fender's sale to CBS in 1965. CBS oversaw mass production of the Rhodes piano in the 1970s, and it was used extensively through the decade, particularly in jazz, pop, and soul music, as well by many rock artists. It was less used in the 1980s because of competition with polyphonic and digital synthesizers such as the Yamaha DX7 and inconsistent quality control caused by cost-cutting.

In 1987, the company was sold to Roland, which manufactured digital versions of the piano, to Harold Rhodes' criticism. In the 1990s, the Rhodes piano underwent a resurgence in popularity, resulting in Rhodes re-obtaining the rights in 1997. Though Harold Rhodes died in 2000, the Rhodes piano has been reissued and his teaching methods are still in use.

== Features ==
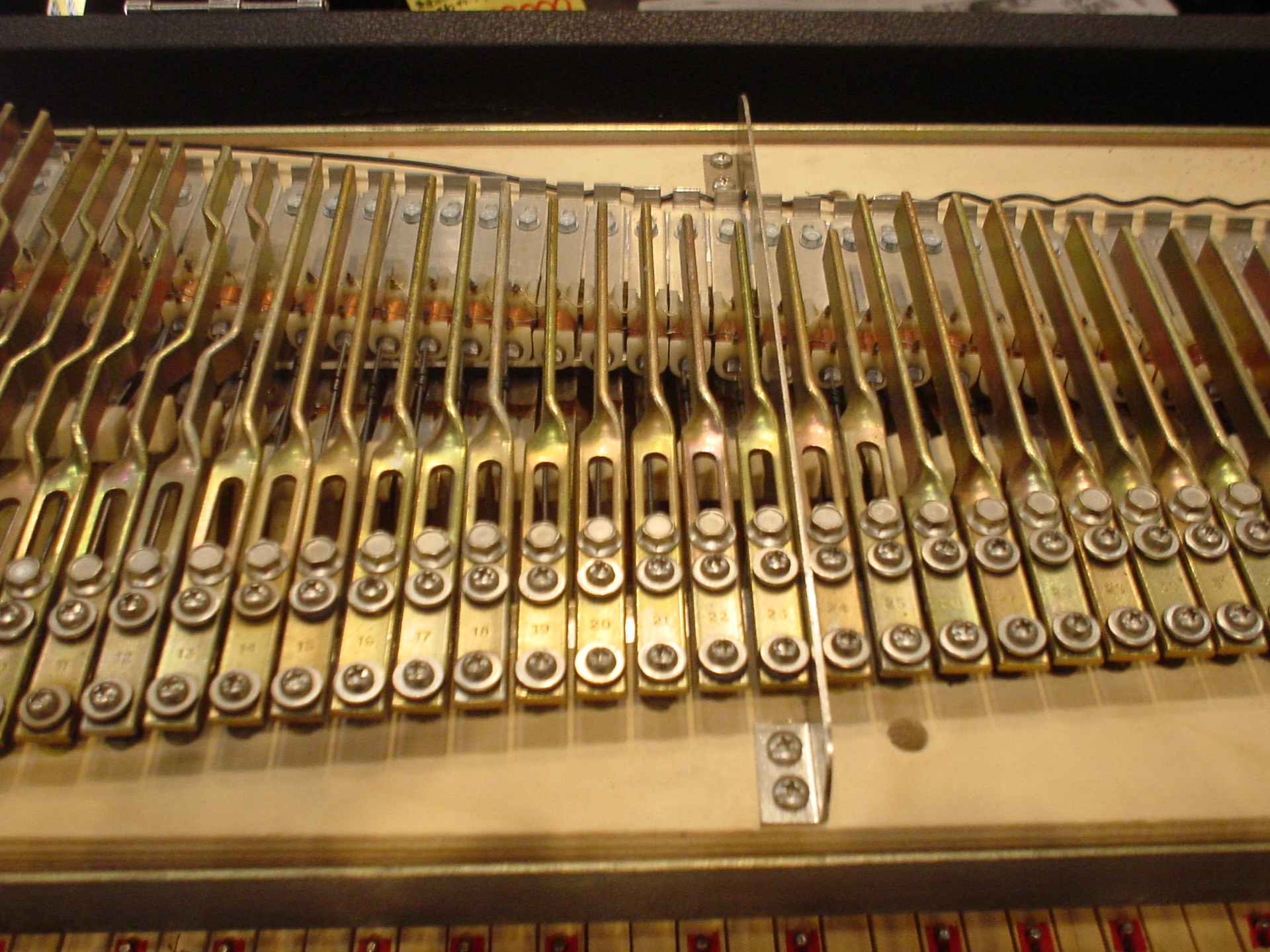
The Rhodes piano generates its sound by hammers hitting a bar of metal known as a tine.

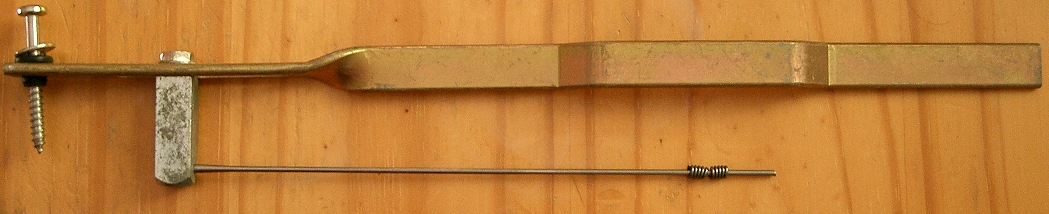
Side view of "tone generator assembly", resembling a tuning fork consisting of a twisted metal tone bar and the tine below it.

Rhodes Mark I Tube amp
A Rhodes Mark I played on a tube amplifier (overdriven).

The Rhodes piano's keyboard is laid out like a traditional acoustic piano, but some models contain 73 keys instead of 88. The 73-key model weighs around 130 pounds (59 kg). The keyboard's touch and action is designed to be like an acoustic piano. Pressing a key results in a hammer striking a thin metal rod called a tine connected to a larger "tone bar". The tone generator assembly acts as a tuning fork as the tone bar reinforces and extends the tine's vibrations. A pickup sits opposite the tine, inducing an electric current from the vibrations like an electric guitar. Simply hitting tines does not need an external power supply, and a Rhodes will make sound even when not plugged into an amplifier, though like an unplugged electric guitar, the volume level and tone will be diminished.

The Suitcase model Rhodes includes a built-in power amplifier and a tremolo feature that bounces the output signal from the piano across two speakers. This feature is inaccurately labeled "vibrato" (which is a variation in pitch) on some models to be consistent with the labelling on Fender amplifiers.

Although the Rhodes functions mechanically like a piano, its sound is different. Vibrating tines produce a mellower timbre, and the sound changes with the tine's relative position to the pickup. Putting the two close together gives a characteristic "bell" sound. The Rhodes has been compared to the Wurlitzer electronic piano, which uses a similar technology, but with the hammers striking metal reeds. The Rhodes has a better sustain, while the Wurlitzer produces significant harmonics when the keys are played hard, giving it a "bite". According to Benjamin Love of Retro Rentals, an equalization spectrum analysis of the Rhodes will have a gap where the frequency of a lead vocal can be. This means it can easily support a voice performance without overpowering it.

== History ==
=== Early models: Xylette, Pre-Piano ("Bantam Piano") and Piano Bass ===
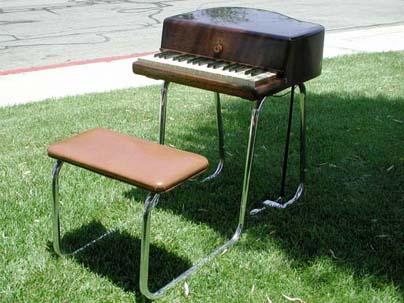
Rhodes's "Pre-Piano", first marketed in 1948

Harold Rhodes started teaching piano when he was 19. He dropped out of the University of Southern California in 1929 to support his family through the Great Depression by full-time teaching. He designed a method that combined classical and jazz music, which became popular across the United States, and led to an hour-long nationally syndicated radio show. Rhodes continued to teach piano throughout his lifetime, and his method continues to be taught today. He continually refined the Rhodes piano design up to 1984.

By 1942, Rhodes was in the Army Air Corps, where he created a piano teaching method to provide therapy for soldiers recovering from combat in hospital. From scrapped airplanes, he eventually developed miniature pianos that could be played in bed. He was discharged from the Army Air Corps in September 1944. He named his (non-amplified) lap instrument the "Xylette", and a 1945 newspaper described its materials and their source: "The Xylette is being constructed by patients in the craft shops of the convalescent hospitals. The [aluminum] xylophone bars are made from discarded hydraulic systems, the plywood from hatchways, keys from the fuselage spruce, and hammers from the hardwood of the propellor."

On March 18, 1945, Rhodes visited the Santa Ana Army Base Convalescent Hospital, in Santa Ana, California, bringing with him eight Xylettes, and having visited seven similar military hospitals across the U.S. When Rhodes had visited the Army's Fort Logan convalescent hospital, in Fort Logan, Colorado, a month earlier, he supervised construction of Xylettes and provided instruction, noting that "exercise afforded by a keyboard instrument is effective in the restoration of neuro-muscular coordination of fingers, hands and arms". A Popular Mechanics article in June 1945 pictured recovering veterans playing their Xylettes at the Army's Ft. Thomas convalescent hospital, in Fort Thomas, Kentucky.

Rhodes, in California, next developed an electrically-amplified 38-key instrument, again without strings—instead, using carbon steel rods and advertised as "never needing to be tuned". It was labeled the "Pre-Piano", also being advertised as the "Bantam Piano" or the "Harold Rhodes Electric Piano" to broaden its appeal. Its public debut was in Los Angeles on May 21, 1948, at the Broadway department store. Rhodes was present as demonstrator, as was the songwriter Jimmy McHugh; by that date, Rhodes had built 100 Rhodes pianos in his factory space at 2370 E. Foothill Blvd. in Pasadena.

Prior to the instrument's first retail sales, Harold Rhodes had exhibited it in Los Angeles on 11-20 July 1947 at the Pan-Pacific Auditorium as part of the "World Inventor's Exposition."

By mid-1948 the Pre-Piano was being used for teaching in the Los Angeles public school system, and was eventually adopted in other cities, including Chicago. Among Rhodes's promotional appearances away from Los Angeles was Chicago's Lyon & Healy music store, where he demonstrated the piano between July 21 and 23, 1948. In mid-1948 pianist and song-stylist Gwen Bari was Rhodes's representative and demonstrator in Philadelphia,—including a local television broadcast. She likewise appeared for promotions in Cleveland, New York, and Chicago. Her husband and violinist-partner, Gene Bari, was Rhodes's sales agent in Palm Springs (CA), advertising the Rhodes piano at $189.50 with amplification either built in or as an outboard unit, though it "also plays without amplification". The piano weighed twenty pounds by itself, and thirty pounds including its tubular base with attached seat, and the Baris were then using it in performances at Palm Springs' Desert Inn.

In 1958, Rhodes began a business affiliation with Leo Fender to manufacture instruments. For Fender, Rhodes developed a 32-note keyboard bass approximating the string bass's range (E1-B3), known as the Piano Bass. It introduced the design that would become common in subsequent Rhodes pianos, with the same Tolex body as Fender amplifiers and a fiberglass top. The tops came from a boat manufacturer who supplied whatever color happened to be available; consequently a number of different colored piano basses were produced.

Some recent, undocumented sources place Piano Bass manufacture as early as 1959. Actual production (for retail sale) in Fender's Fullerton plant, however, began early in 1962—following manufacture of prototypes that "[had then] been in use throughout the Southwest for more than a year".

=== Under CBS ===
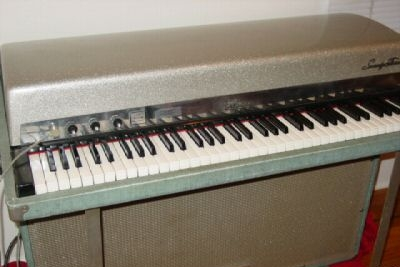
A pre-1969 "Silvertop" Fender Rhodes Electric Piano

Fender was bought by CBS in 1965. Rhodes stayed with the company, and released the first Fender Rhodes piano, a 73-note model. It comprised parts — the piano, and a separate enclosure underneath containing the power amplifier and loudspeaker. Like the piano bass, it was finished in black Tolex, and had a fiberglass top. During the late 1960s, two models of the Fender Rhodes Celeste also became available, which used the top three or four octaves, respectively, of the Fender Rhodes piano. The Celeste did not sell well and is now hard to find. In 1969, the fiberglass lid was replaced with vacuum-molded plastic; the earlier models became known retrospectively as "silvertops".

The Student and Instructor models were introduced in 1965. They were designed to teach the piano in the classroom. By connecting the output of a network of student models, the teacher could listen to each student in isolation on the instructor model, and send an audio backing track to them. This allowed the teacher to monitor individual students' progress. Production of educational models ceased in 1974.

In 1970, the 73-note Stage Piano was introduced as a lighter (130 pounds (59 kg)) and more portable alternative to the existing two-piece style, featuring four detachable legs (used in Fender steel pedal guitars), a sustain pedal derived from a Rogers hi-hat stand and a single output jack. Although the Stage could be used with any amplifier, catalogs suggested the use of the Fender Twin Reverb. The older style piano continued to be sold alongside the Stage and was renamed the Suitcase Piano. An 88-note model was introduced in 1971.

The Rhodes became increasingly popular during the 1970s. In 1976, the company posted an advertisement claiming that of the top 100 Billboard albums featuring electric pianos, 82% of them used a Rhodes.

=== Later models ===
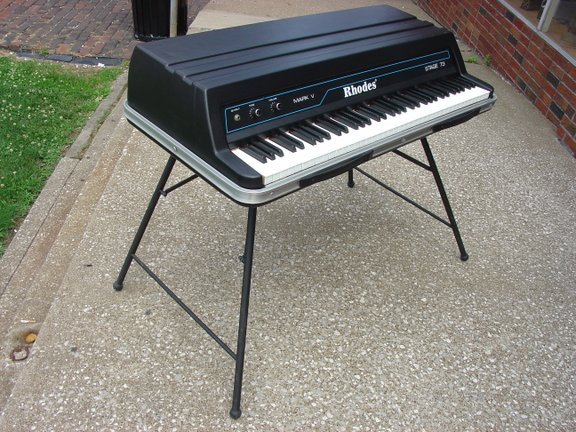
The Rhodes Mk V was the last model released by the original Rhodes corporation.

During the 1970s various changes were made to the Rhodes mechanics. In 1971 the hammer tips were changed to neoprene rubber instead of felt, to avoid the excessive need for regular maintenance, while in 1975 harp supports were changed from wood to aluminum. Although this made production cheaper, it changed the resonance slightly. In 1977 the power amplifier design was changed from an 80 to a 100-watt model. The Mk II model was introduced in late 1979, which was simply a set of cosmetic changes over the most recent Mk I models. A 54-note model was added to the range.

The Rhodes Mk III EK-10 was a combination electric piano and synthesizer, introduced in 1980 before CBS bought ARP Instruments in 1981. It used analog oscillators and filters alongside the existing electromechanical elements. The overall effect was that of a Rhodes piano and a synthesizer being played simultaneously. It was unreliable with a problematic production, particularly when a shipment of 150 units to Japan caused interference with local television reception. Compared to the new polyphonic synthesizers being marketed at the time, it was limited in scope and sound, and few units were sold.

The final Rhodes produced by the original company was the Mk V in 1984. Among other improvements, it had a lighter plastic body and an improved action that varied the dynamics with each note. The Mark V is the easiest of the original Rhodes pianos for touring musicians to transport. Rhodes pianos produced under the original run had an inconsistent quality as the company wanted to mass-produce them.

During the late 1970s and 1980s, Chuck Monte manufactured an after-market modification to the Rhodes, known as Dyno My Piano. It included a lever that moved the relative position of the tines to the pickups, modifying the sound, and fed the output signal through additional electronics. This sound was emulated by the Yamaha DX7 with a patch known as the DX7 Rhodes that was popular during the 1980s, and caused several players to abandon the Rhodes in favor of the DX7.

=== After CBS ===
It’s impossible to reinvent an instrument as iconic as the Rhodes piano. So we’re not going to try.

— Matt Pelling of Rhodes Music Group, as quoted by Mark Gilbert of Jazz Journal (October 8, 2024)

In 1983, Rhodes was sold to the CBS boss, William Schultz, who closed the main factory in 1985 and sold the business to the Japanese corporation Roland in 1987. In 1989, Roland introduced two digital pianos, the Rhodes MK80 and MK60, essentially re-engineered versions of Roland's RD-1000, which they closely resembled. They were made without Harold Rhodes' consultation and he disapproved of them.

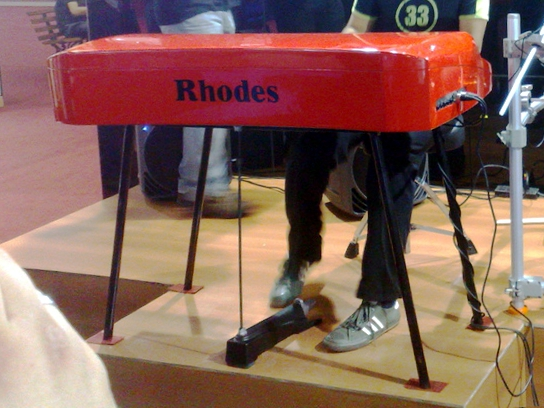
The Rhodes Mark 7 was released in 2007.

Rhodes re-acquired the rights to the Rhodes piano in 1997. By then, he was in ill health and died in December 2000. In 2007, his former business partner Joe Brandstetter acquired the rights to the name and re-formed Rhodes Music Corporation. The company introduced a reproduction of the original electric piano, the Rhodes Mark 7, housed in a molded plexiglass enclosure.

In 2021, a new company, Rhodes Music Group Ltd, was formed by the audio company Loopmasters who licensed the trademark rights from Brandstetter. They announced a new model, the MK8, in development. The MK8 was made available for pre-order in November with 500 units planned for production in 2022. The MK8's case was designed by Axel Hartmann and its electronics were designed by former Moog Music technician Cyril Lance. At 75 pounds (34 kg), it is significantly lighter than earlier models.

== Notable users ==
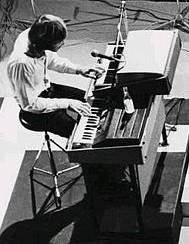
Ray Manzarek performing live with the Doors in 1968 using a Rhodes Piano Bass

The Doors keyboardist Ray Manzarek began using Rhodes instruments when the Doors formed in 1965. He played basslines on a Piano Bass with his left hand, while playing organ with his right. He also played a full-sized Rhodes in the studio, such as a Mark I Stage 73 on "Riders on the Storm". According to Manzarek, "If Mr. Rhodes hadn't created the keyboard bass, the Doors would never have existed."

The Rhodes piano became a popular instrument in jazz in the late 1960s, particularly for several sidemen who played with Miles Davis. Herbie Hancock first encountered the Rhodes in 1968 while booked for a session with Davis. He immediately became an enthusiast, noting that the amplification made him much more audible in groups when compared to the piano. Hancock continued to experiment with the Rhodes over the following years, including playing it through a wah-wah. Other former Davis sidemen Chick Corea and Joe Zawinul started using the Rhodes prominently during the 1970s. Beginning with In a Silent Way (1969), the Rhodes became the most prominent keyboard on Davis's recordings until the mid-1970s.

Vince Guaraldi started using a Rhodes in 1968, and toured with both an acoustic piano and a Rhodes. He achieved particular prominence with his soundtrack music for A Charlie Brown Christmas and other Peanuts/Charlie Brown films. Billy Preston was described as the "Ruler of the Rhodes" by Music Radar; he played it during the Beatles' rooftop concert in 1969, and on the Beatles' hit single "Get Back". Many of Stevie Wonder's 1970s recordings, such as "You Are the Sunshine of My Life", feature the Rhodes, often alongside the Hohner Clavinet. Donny Hathaway regularly used the Rhodes, such as on his hit single "This Christmas". Although better known for playing the Wurlitzer, Ray Charles played a Rhodes on his performance of "Shake a Tailfeather" in the film The Blues Brothers.

Donald Fagen of Steely Dan has regularly used the Rhodes. He has used it on all his solo albums and has played it at every one of his touring performances since 1994. The Rhodes features in "Angela", the 1978 instrumental theme from the sitcom Taxi by Bob James. The French band Air make regular use of the Rhodes piano. The German pianist and composer Nils Frahm uses a Rhodes piano extensively in his studio and live performances. The film composer Angelo Badalamenti composed and recorded the theme song for the TV series Twin Peaks, created by David Lynch, using the Rhodes.
