= Black River Township, Butler County, Missouri =

Township in the US state of Missouri

Black River Township
- Township
- Coordinates: 36°53′11″N 090°26′47″W
- Country: United States
- State: Missouri
- County: Butler

Area
  - Total: 51 sq mi (133 km^{2})
  - Land: 51.29 sq mi (132.83 km^{2})
  - Water: 0.062 sq mi (0.16 km^{2}) 0.12%
- Elevation: 410 ft (125 m)

Population (2010)
  - Total: 1,665
  - Density: 29/sq mi (11.2/km^{2})
- FIPS code: 29-06076
- GNIS feature ID: 0766350

Black River Township is one of ten townships in Butler County, Missouri, USA. As of the 2010 census, its population was 1,665.

== Geography ==
Black River Township covers an area of 51.35 square miles (133.0 km^{2}) and contains no incorporated settlements. It contains eight cemeteries: Black River, Davidson, Harwell, Keele, Magill, Military Crossing, Nunley and Three Springs.

The streams of Aldridge Creek, Hartman Creek, Powers Creek, Swift Creek and Widow Creek run through this township.
