= Stephan Bernsee =

German computer programmer (born 1971)

- Born: Stephan Sprenger; 1971 (age 54–55); Karlsruhe, Germany
- Occupations: Software developer, DSP Engineer
- Website: www.dspdimension.com

Stephan Bernsee (born 1971) is a digital signal processing applications developer from Germany.

== Background ==
Bernsee is the founder of the audio software company Prosoniq and the principal developer of the sound synthesis technology used in the Hartmann Neuron series of synthesizers, the audio timescale-pitch modification technology behind Prosoniq TimeFactory, its popular vocoder OrangeVocoder and the sonicWORX Isolate application which does pattern detection to allow extracting, manipulating and suppressing individual notes and sounds within a song. He holds a couple of patents, including one for localizing audio in 3D space.

In 2011 he co-founded Zynaptiq, a Hannover-based startup company specializing in reverb removal, polyphonic pitch modification and automatic optimization of music tracks based on artificial intelligence.
