= East Texas Arboretum and Botanical Society =

Botanical gardens in Athens, Texas

Coordinates: 32.2129°N 95.8785°W

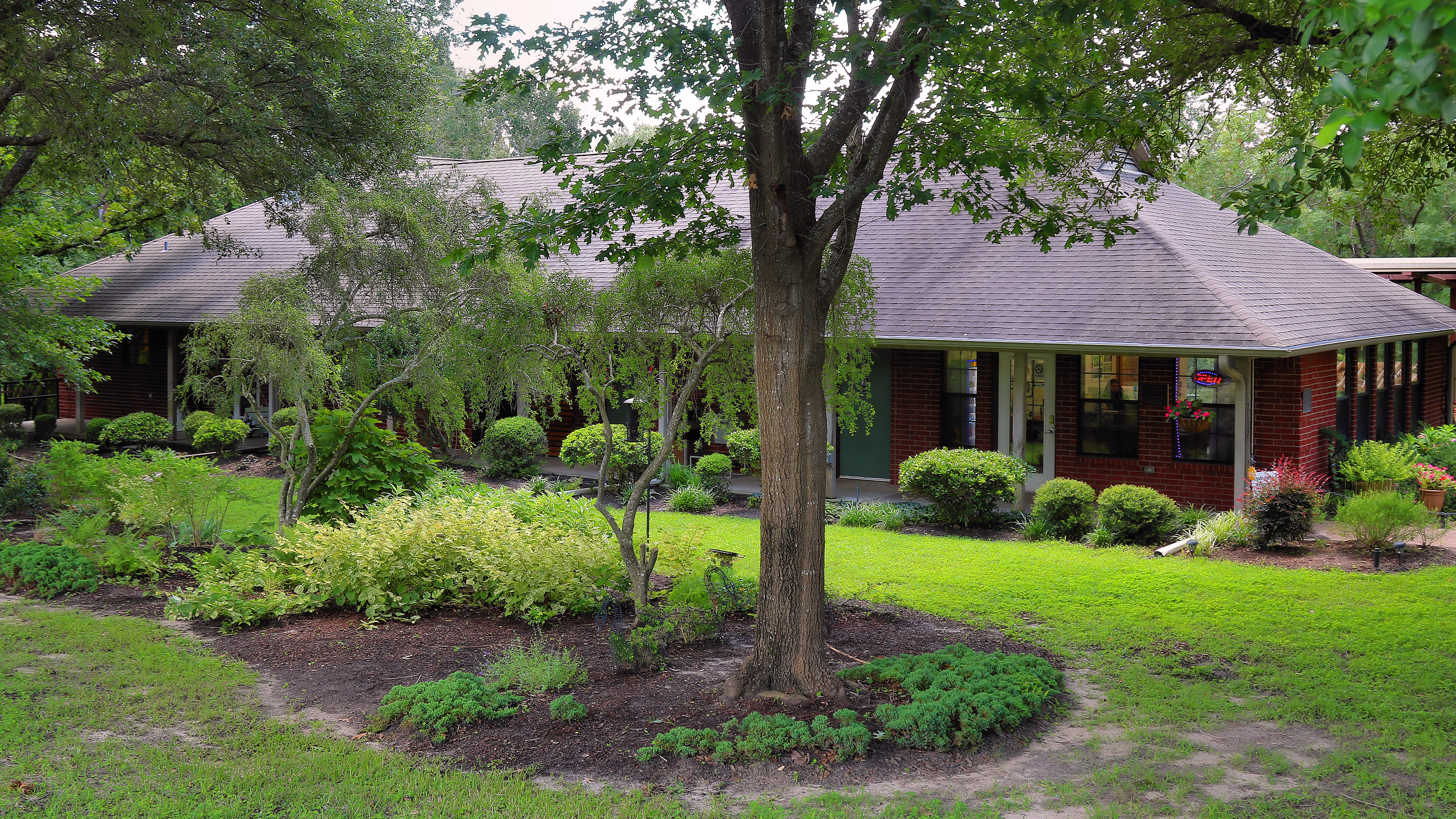
- The Women's building houses the office and meeting rooms.
- Interactive map of East Texas Arboretum and Botanical Society
- Type: Arboretum, Botanical gardens
- Open: Open daily
- Website: www.easttexasarboretum.org

The East Texas Arboretum and Botanical Society "ETABS" (over 100 acres) is an arboretum and collection of botanical gardens and historical buildings located at 1601 Patterson Road, Athens, Texas in the United States. It is open daily, an admission fee is charged. ETABS is a not-for-profit recognized by the IRS as a 501 (c)(3). Memberships are available and donations are welcome.

The arboretum was established in 1993 on the site of a former truck farm, with dry hills, hardwood forest, seasonal bogs, and permanent wetlands along Walnut Creek. Volunteer work is ongoing. At present the site features the arboretum and a variety of gardens, including butterfly, cottage, display, herb, kitchen, native plant, perennial, master gardeners' Dream Garden, and rose gardens. It also contains a collection of historical buildings, water garden, and two miles of hiking trails. Web site features history, maps, photos and brochures.

The office is located in the Women's building where many of the local garden clubs meet and socialize.

Events include fundraisers, gardening workshops, festivals and is available for private events such as weddings and family gatherings.

== See also ==
- List of botanical gardens and arboretums in Texas
