= Squire Hardman =

Squire Hardman may refer to:

- Squire Hardman (poem), a pornographic poem published by John Glassco in 1967, falsely attributed to George Colman the Younger
- Squire Hardman (character), a character in Sweet Ermengarde, a melodrama by H. P. Lovecraft

== See also ==
- Sir John Hardman, Esquire (1694–1755), British merchant, politician, and slave trader
- John W. Hartmann, Esquire (born 1967), U.S. composer
- Hardman (surname)
- Hardman (disambiguation)
