= Houston Arboretum and Nature Center =

Arboretum and nature center in Houston, Texas, US

Coordinates: 29°45′55″N 95°27′07″W

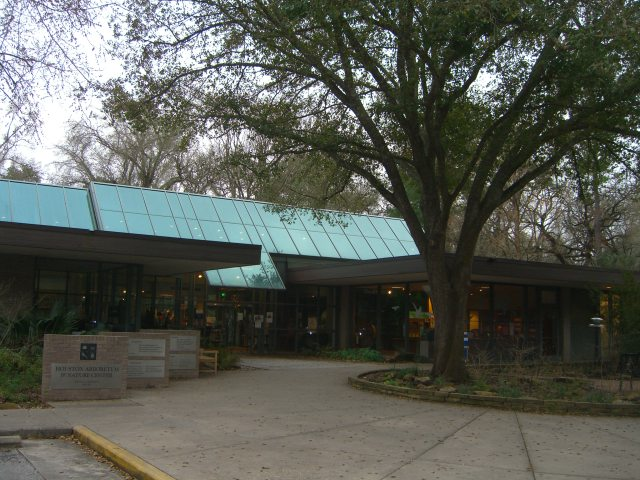
- Interactive map of Houston Arboretum and Nature Center
- Type: Arboretum, Nature center
- Location: Memorial Park at 4501 Woodway Drive, Houston, Texas
- Open: Open daily.
- Website: houstonarboretum.org

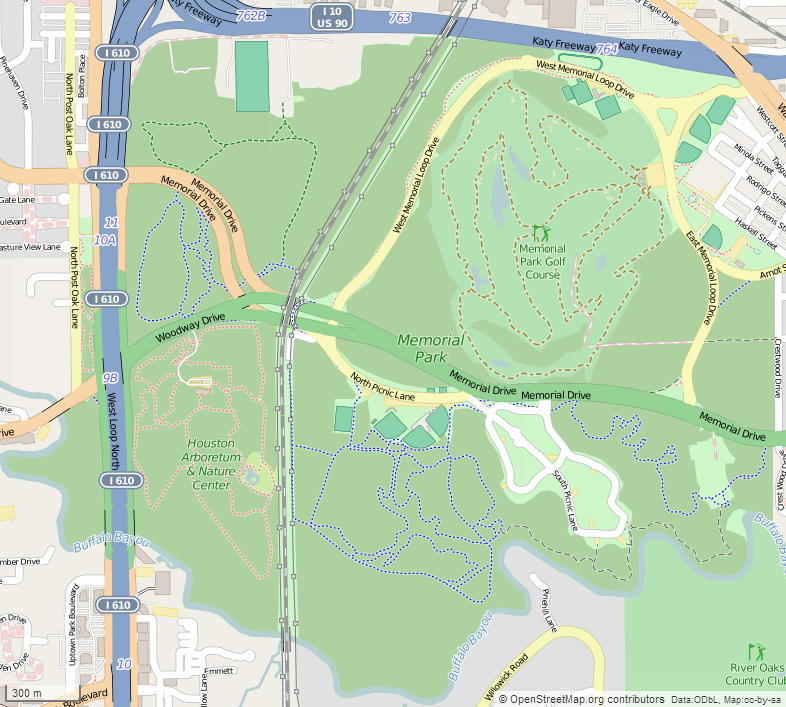
Location within Memorial Park

The Houston Arboretum and Nature Center (155 acres) is a non-profit arboretum and nature center located in Memorial Park at 4501 Woodway Drive, Houston, Texas. It is open daily with free admission.

The arboretum was first conceived by Robert A. Vines, and in 1951 park land was set aside by the City Council for the Houston Botanical Society. (Today's arboretum is somewhat smaller than its initial 265-acre (1.07 km^{2}) site.) The children's botanical hall was funded in 1966, and nature center begun in 1967. The Houston Arboretum is managed by the Houston Arboretum & Nature Center Board of Directors and staff under an agreement with the City of Houston Parks and Recreation Department.

The organization was renamed in the 1980s; donations in the 1990s provided for major renovations and expansions.

Today the arboretum contains over five miles (8 km) of nature trails, with forest, pond, wetland, and meadow habitats. Specialty gardens include a Hummingbird & Butterfly Island, Sensory Garden, and Wildlife Garden. It is a favorite date spot for Houstonians.

== See also ==
- List of botanical gardens and arboretums in Texas
