= Harold Rhodes (inventor) =

American music inventor

- Born: Harold Burroughs Rhodes; December 28, 1910; San Fernando, California, U.S.
- Died: December 17, 2000 (aged 89); Canoga Park, California, U.S.
- Occupations: Inventor, music teacher
- Known for: Rhodes piano
- Spouse: Margit Rhodes (m. 1991)
- Children: 11

Harold Burroughs Rhodes (December 28, 1910 – December 17, 2000) was an American music inventor of the Army Air Corps Piano, the Pre-piano and the Rhodes piano (Fender Rhodes). He started his career by running piano schools around the United States.

== Early life and career ==
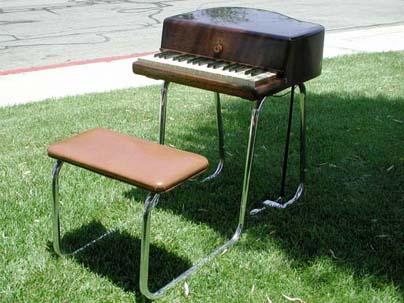
Pre-piano, 1946

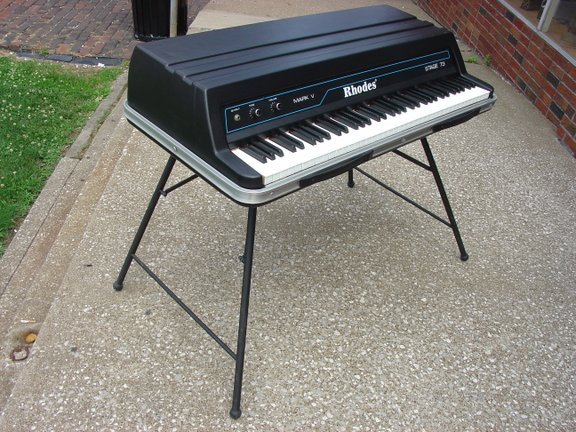
Rhodes Mark V

Rhodes was born in San Fernando, California, and became interested in music and architecture. He received a scholarship to study architecture at the University of Southern California but in 1929, as the Great Depression began, he dropped out to support his family. He began teaching piano when he was 19, and developed his own method that was designed to bridge classical piano instruction, with its reliance on written music, and jazz improvisation. The Rhodes Method was picked up across the United States.

During World War II, he joined the Army Air Corps, where he taught fellow servicemen and entertained wounded airmen. To bring a small, portable piano to bedridden patients, in 1942 he built a 29-note keyboard using aluminum tubing from a B-17 to make a xylophone-like instrument, called the Army Air Corps lap model piano. After the war, he founded the Rhodes Piano Corporation, which built what he called the Pre-Piano in 1946.

Leo Fender, the electric guitar pioneer, bought Rhodes's company in 1959 and began manufacturing the Piano Bass, a keyboard instrument with the bottom 32 notes of a piano. The Doors' keyboardist, Ray Manzarek, was one of the most prominent musicians to use the Piano Bass; he also gave the later Fender Rhodes piano a showcase in the song ''Riders on the Storm.''

CBS bought Fender's instrument company in 1965. Working for CBS, Rhodes introduced the 73-note Fender Rhodes Suitcase Piano, which combined a keyboard, amplifier and speaker cabinets. In 1970, the company started making the Stage Piano, without the speakers, which could be transported more easily and plugged into amplifiers or sound systems. Full, 88-key models were also made. Soon, the Fender Rhodes tones were heard everywhere.

The Rhodes company was sold in 1983 to Bill Schultz, formerly with Fender Rhodes, and Schultz then sold the Rhodes name to the Roland Corporation, a Japanese instrument manufacturer, in 1987. Rhodes was not informed, his wife said. Under the Rhodes name, Roland made keyboards that included a digital version of the Rhodes piano sound. Rhodes disapproved. ''He wouldn't have one in the house,'' said Mrs. Rhodes.

In 1997, Roland returned the rights to the Rhodes name to Harold Rhodes after Joe Brandstetter, a music-store owner, Harold's business partner and friend purchased the trademark from Roland for Harold, according to Rhodes's wife, Margit. Brandstetter eventually purchased in 2003 all rights to the Rhodes Trademark and Harold Rhodes Rights of Publicity from the Rhodes family. Brandstetter carried Harold's wish for him to return an improved Rhodes analog instrument, true to the classic design but with improvements such as weight reduction, pre amplifier, MIDI interface, real hammer and Rhodes action improvements amongst other improvements, there the Mark 7 was born. Keyboard Magazine- United States, Japan and the European Union all reviewed the new Rhodes Mark 7 with the highest respect and acclamation awards.

Rhodes continued to promulgate the Rhodes Method of teaching piano, and in 1990 made a four video version set entitled "The Rhodes Piano Method". This was financed by Brandstetter, who also in 1994 started teaching the method mainly on the East and West coasts to thousands of students in Montessori Schools, charter schools, public schools, recreation centers, retail establishments, and summer camps.

In 1997, Brandstetter sought NARAS (Grammy Institute) recognition of Rhodes for his lifetime work with Education and Sound and Instrument Science. Michael Green, CEO of NARAS, awarded Rhodes the rare "Lifetime Achievement Award" personally in an outdoor ceremony at Rhodes' rehabilitation hospital in front of many of Harold's fans and family members.

== Death ==
Rhodes suffered a stroke in 1996, and his declining health eventually led him to reside in a nursing home, where he died of complications of pneumonia in 2000, 11 days shy of his 90th birthday. He was survived by Margit Rhodes, their eleven children, nine grandchildren, and Rhodes' brother John.

== Trademark rights and legacy ==
In 2003, the Rhodes trademark was purchased by Brandstetter from the Rhodes family. In 2007, a new model, the Rhodes Mark 7, was introduced. However, due to the stock market crash in 2008, a factory large enough to ramp up production required could not be built and, therefore, many shipments across the world could not be made, and in 2011, Rhodes Music Corporation halted production of the Mark 7 and Speaker Platforms.

== Bibliography ==
- Rhodes, Harold (1997). The Rhodes piano method: Instruction manual, beginner through advanced. E-Z Way Productions. ASIN B0006FDWQS.
