= Hardman, Gilmer County, West Virginia =

- Unincorporated community
- Location within West Virginia Location within the United States
- Coordinates: 38°54′56″N 80°56′43″W
- Country: United States
- State: West Virginia
- County: Gilmer
- Elevation: 725 ft (221 m)
- Time zone: UTC-5 (Eastern (EST))
  - Summer (DST): UTC-4 (EDT)
- GNIS feature ID: 1549727

Hardman is an unincorporated community in Gilmer County, West Virginia, United States. Its post office is closed.
