= Hartman Prehistoric Garden =

Botanical garden

Coordinates: 30.2701°N 97.7718°W

Hartman Prehistoric Gardens

The Hartman Prehistoric Garden is a botanical garden within the Zilker Botanical Garden in Austin, Texas, USA.

In January 1992 Karen and Dr. Mike Duffin discovered dinosaur footprints in Zilker Park in an old limestone quarry which had recently been cleared for the installation of a butterfly garden. Dr. Duffin contacted Professor Wann Langston, director emeritus of the Vertebrate Paleontology Laboratory of the Texas Memorial Museum. The fossils of more than 100 preserved tracks made by six or seven prehistoric reptiles, along with the bones of an ancient turtle were discovered. Immediately they began to study the best means of preserving the tracks. They were mapped and casts were made, and then they were reburied to prevent further deterioration due to exposure to the elements. A major funding drive was undertaken by the Hartman Foundation of West Lake Hills, Texas which provided a major monetary donation, and helped organize many volunteers to develop the site and 2 acres (8,100 m^{2}) of the surrounding area as a Cretaceous habitat, with the footprints remaining buried for protection. Claudette Hartman organized this effort for the Hartman Foundation. The garden hardscape was designed by Larson/Burns and Smith, Inc., and their plans were executed by L&R Construction of Austin, Texas. The plants chosen to populate the garden were those believed to have existed at the end of the Cretaceous Period (approximately 70 million years BP) when the dinosaurs would have walked through the area, including ferns, horsetails, liverworts, cycads, conifers, ginkgos, as well as magnolias and palms. The plantings were procured, designed, and installed by Dr. Craig Nazor. Over 100 species in all were carefully landscaped around the area.

A life-size bronze sculpture of an Ornithomimus, the species of dinosaur believed to have left the tracks, was designed and sculpted by John Maisano and cast at the Deep in the Heart Art Foundry in Bastrop, Texas. The sculpture stands in the center of the gardens, on an island in the main pond.
