= Zilker Botanical Garden =

Botanical garden in Austin, Texas, U.S.

Coordinates: 30.26890°N 97.77140°W

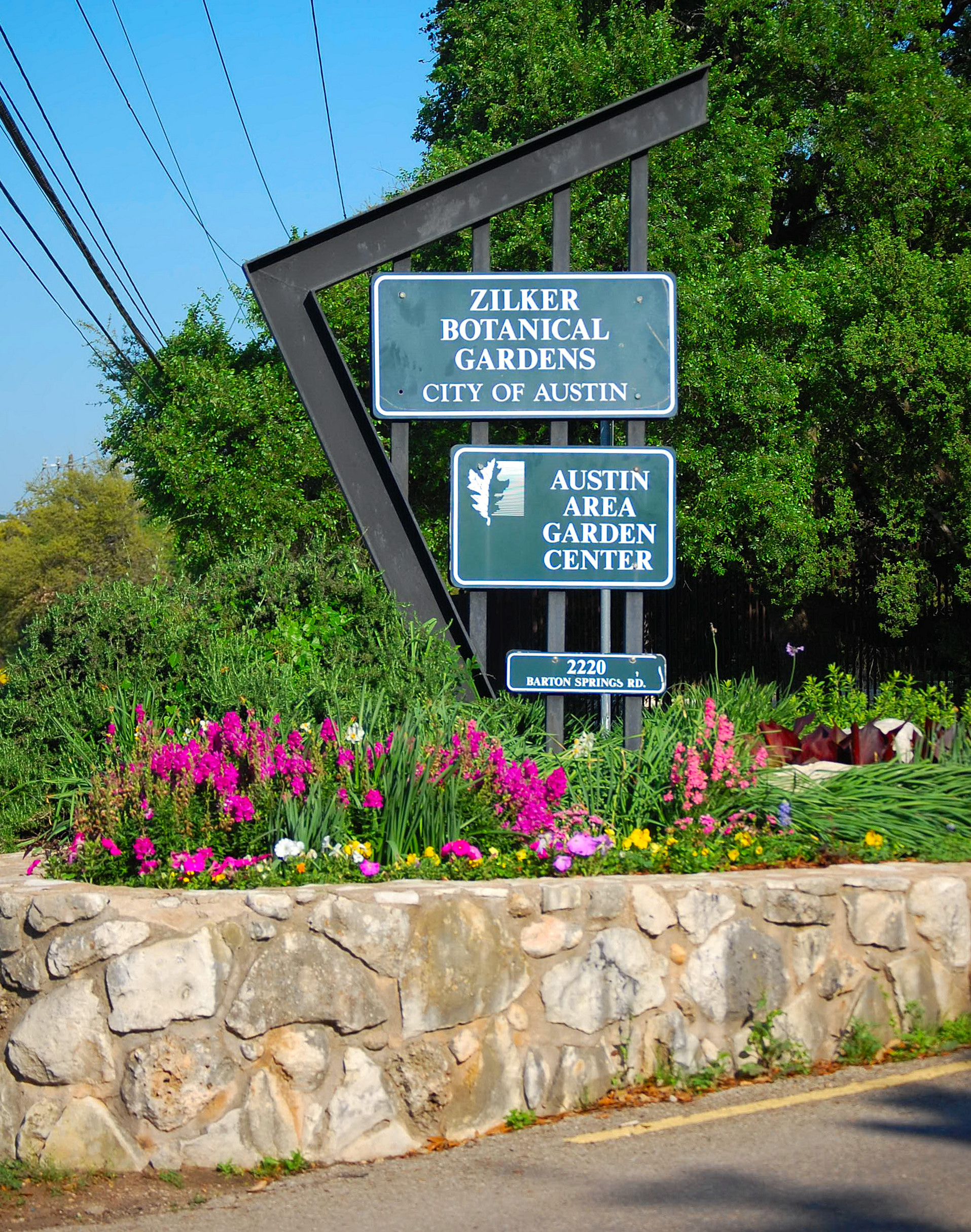
- Entrance sign.
- Interactive map of Zilker Botanical Garden
- Type: Botanical garden
- Location: 2220 Barton Springs Road, near downtown Austin, Texas
- Area: 28 acres (11 ha)
- Website: zilkergarden.org

The Zilker Botanical Garden is a 28-acre (11 ha) botanical garden of varied topography located on the south bank of the Colorado River at 2220 Barton Springs Road, near downtown Austin, Texas, United States.

Theme gardens include the Taniguchi Japanese Garden, The Riparian Streambed, The Hartman Prehistoric Garden, and The Mabel Davis Rose Garden.

The Botanical Garden was established as a non-profit organization in 1955, and is the centerpiece of Zilker Park. It features several independently maintained gardens, each of a particular focus:

- City of Austin's Green Garden
- Cactus and Succulent Garden
- Hartman Prehistoric Garden
- Herb and Fragrance Garden
- Isamu Taniguchi Oriental Garden
- Mabel Davis Rose Garden
- Doug Blachly Butterfly Trail and Garden
- Pioneer Village

== Gallery ==
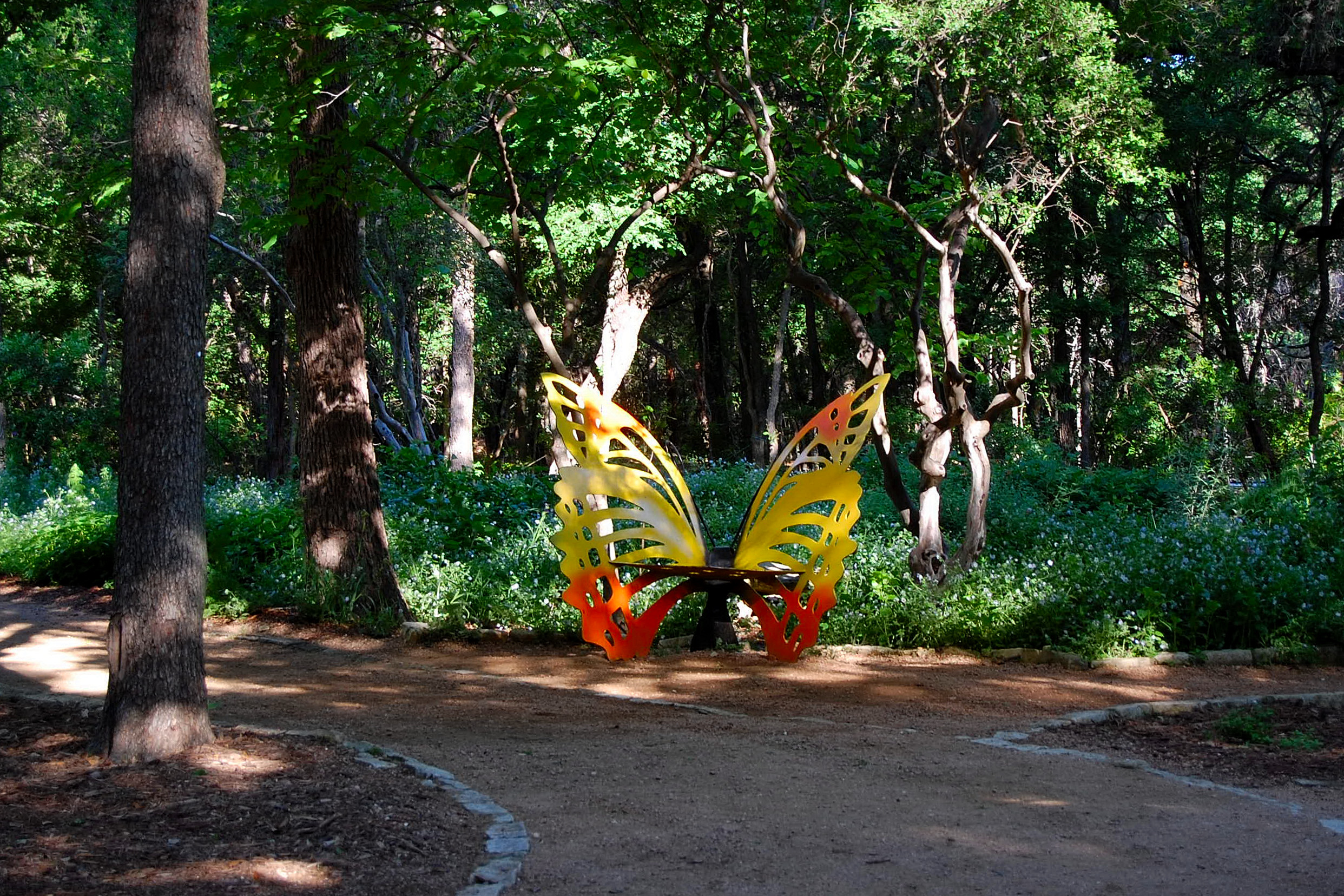
Doug Blachly Butterfly Trail and Garden

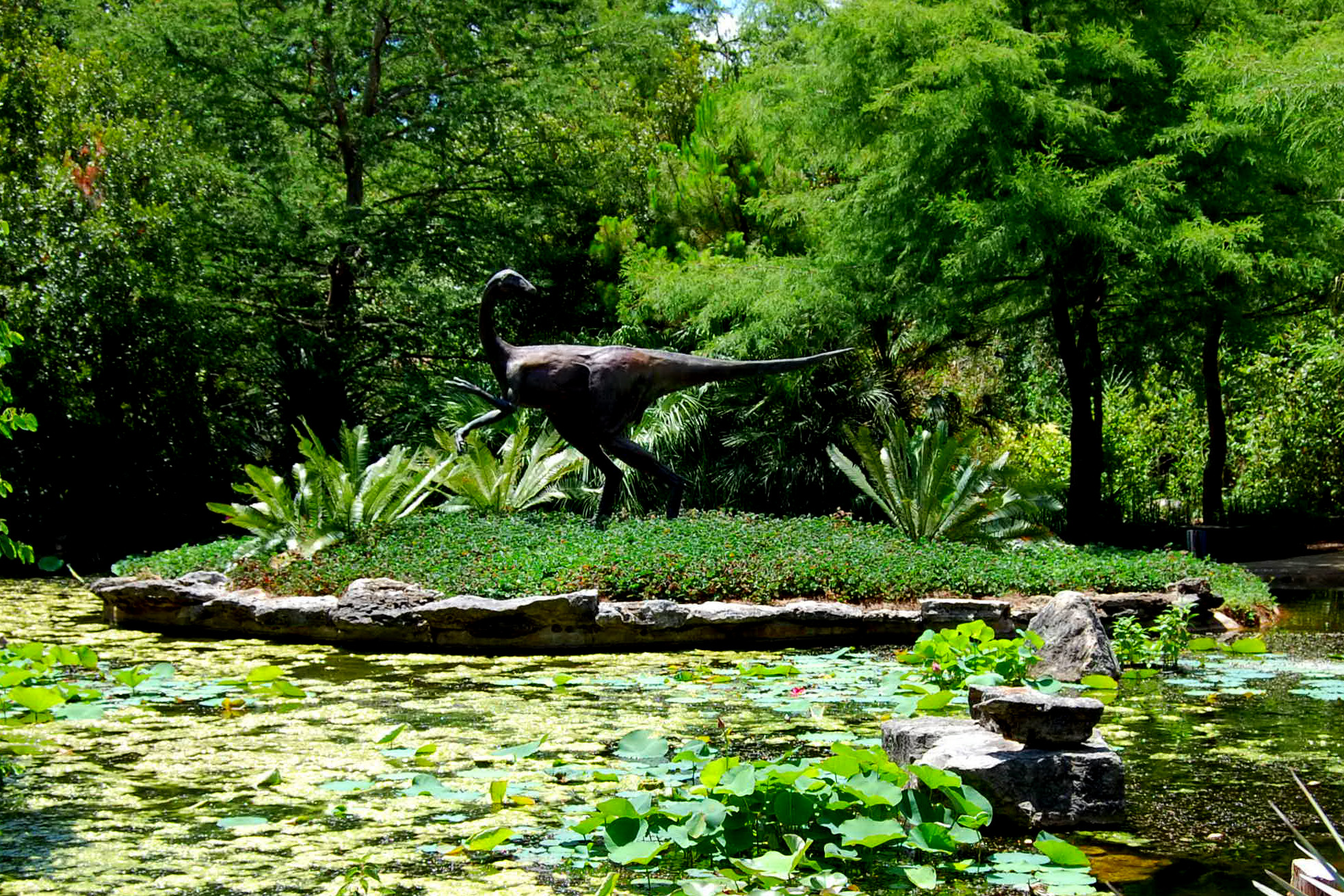
Hartman Prehistoric Garden

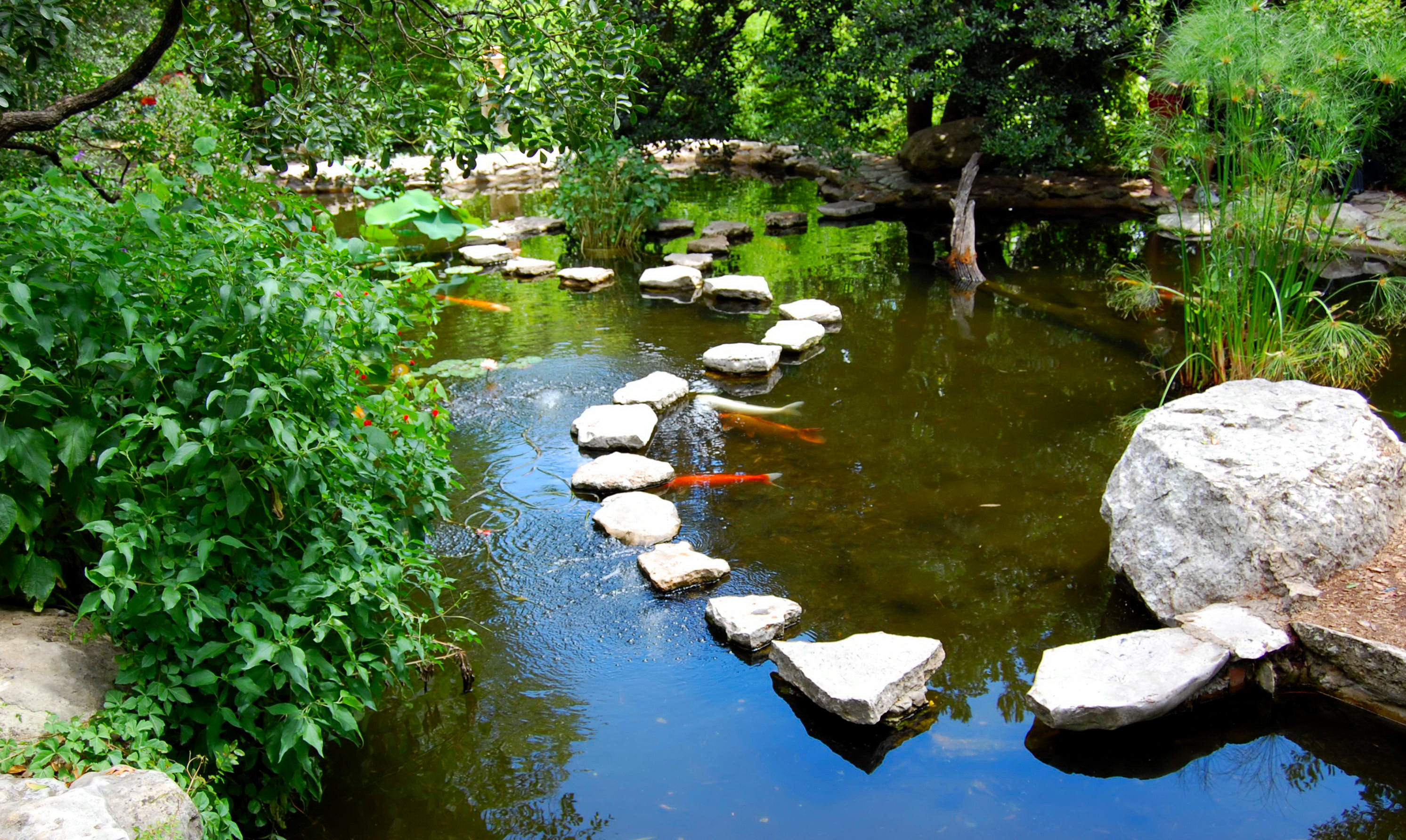
Isamu Taniguchi Japanese Garden Koi Pond

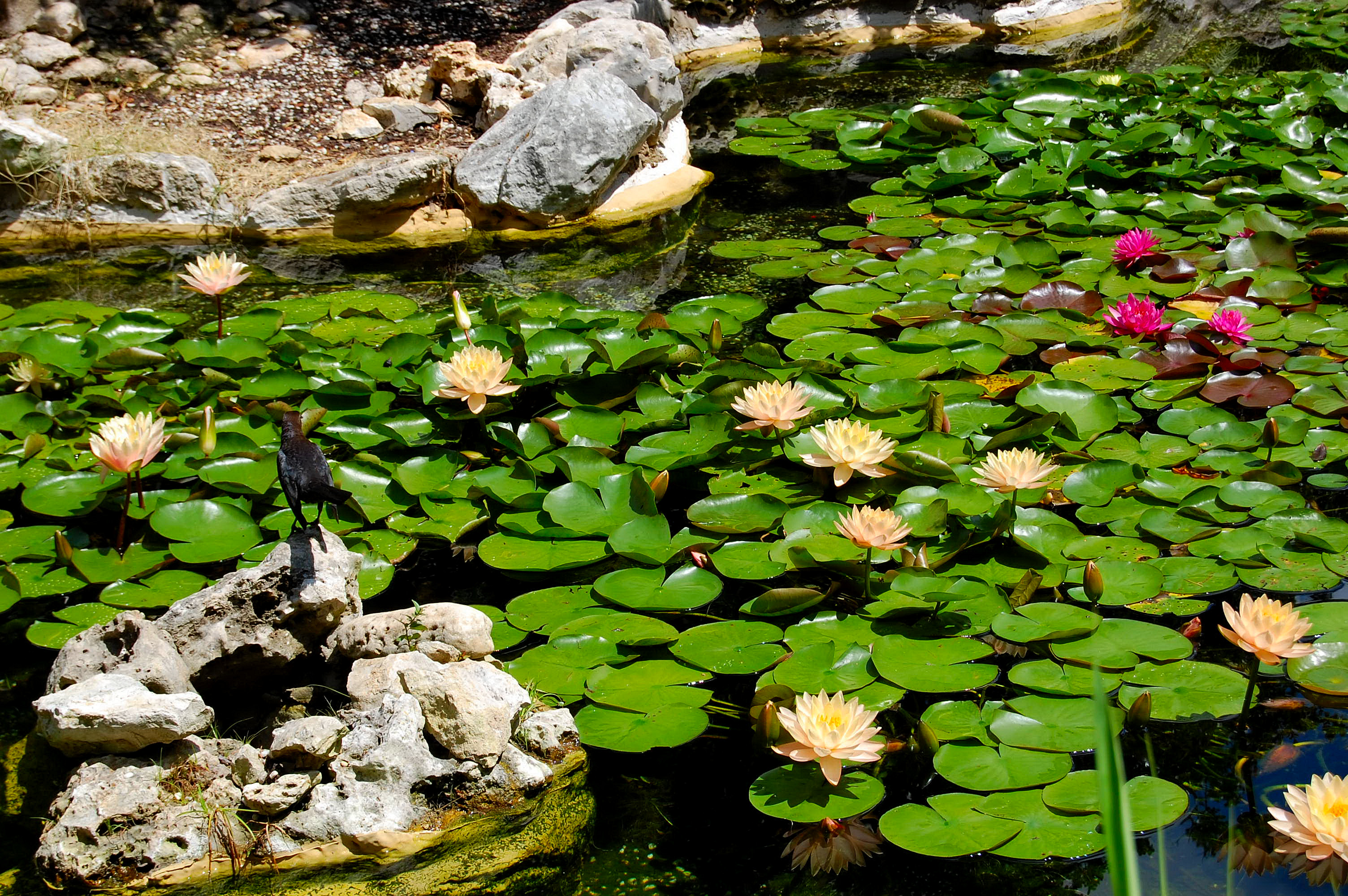
Isamu Taniguchi Japanese Garden Lily Pond

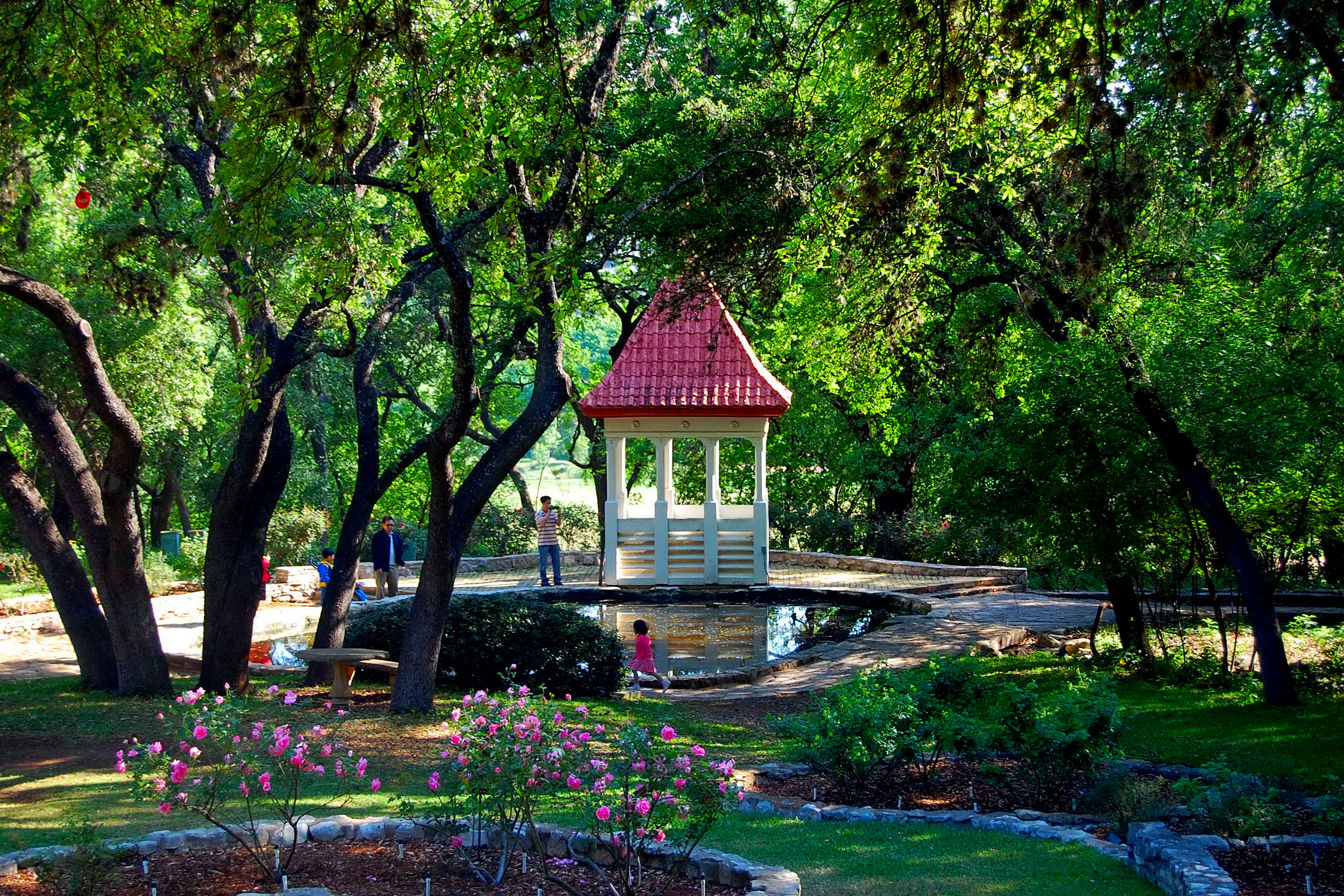
Bickler Cupola

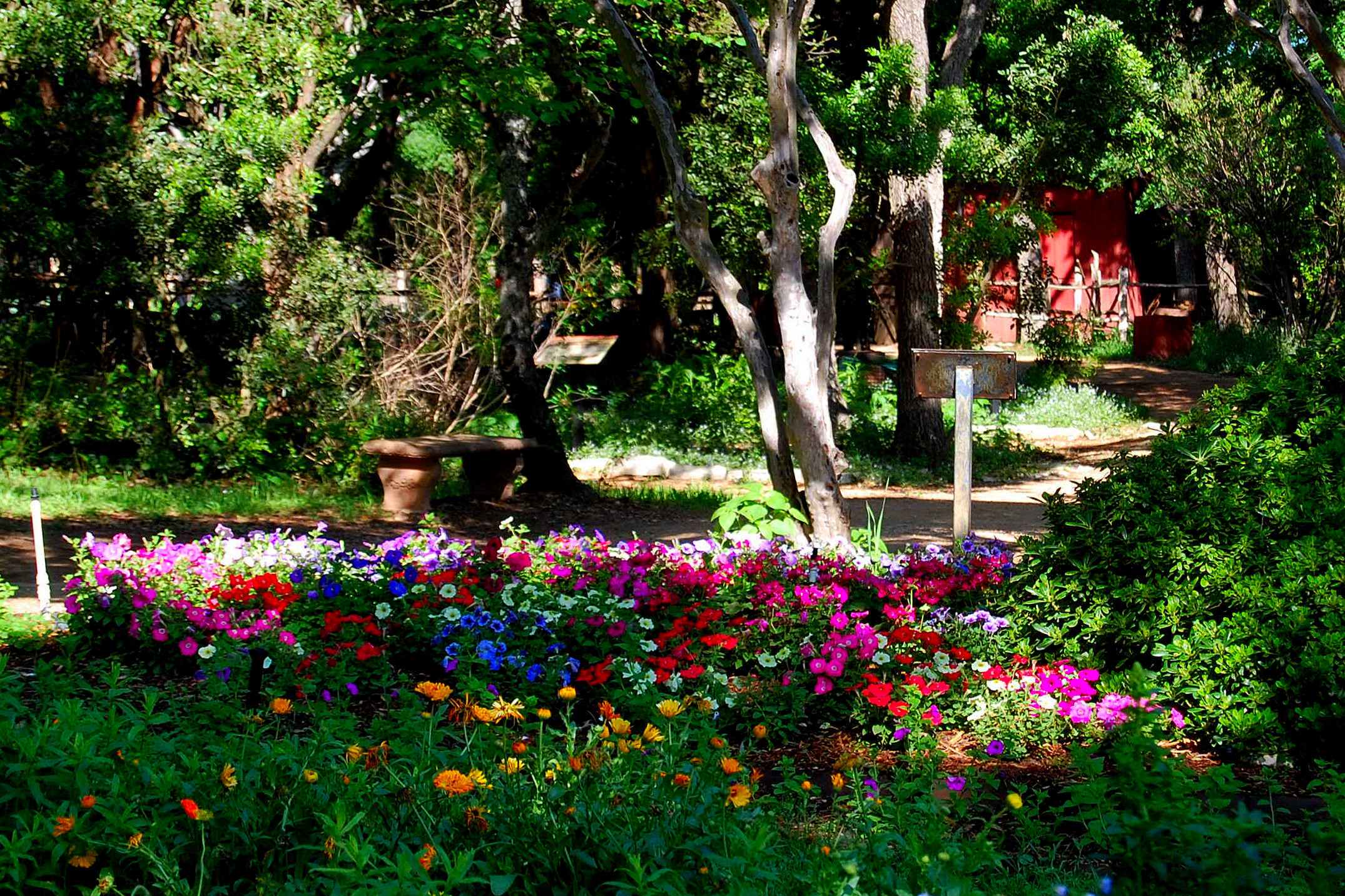
Zilker Botanical Gardens

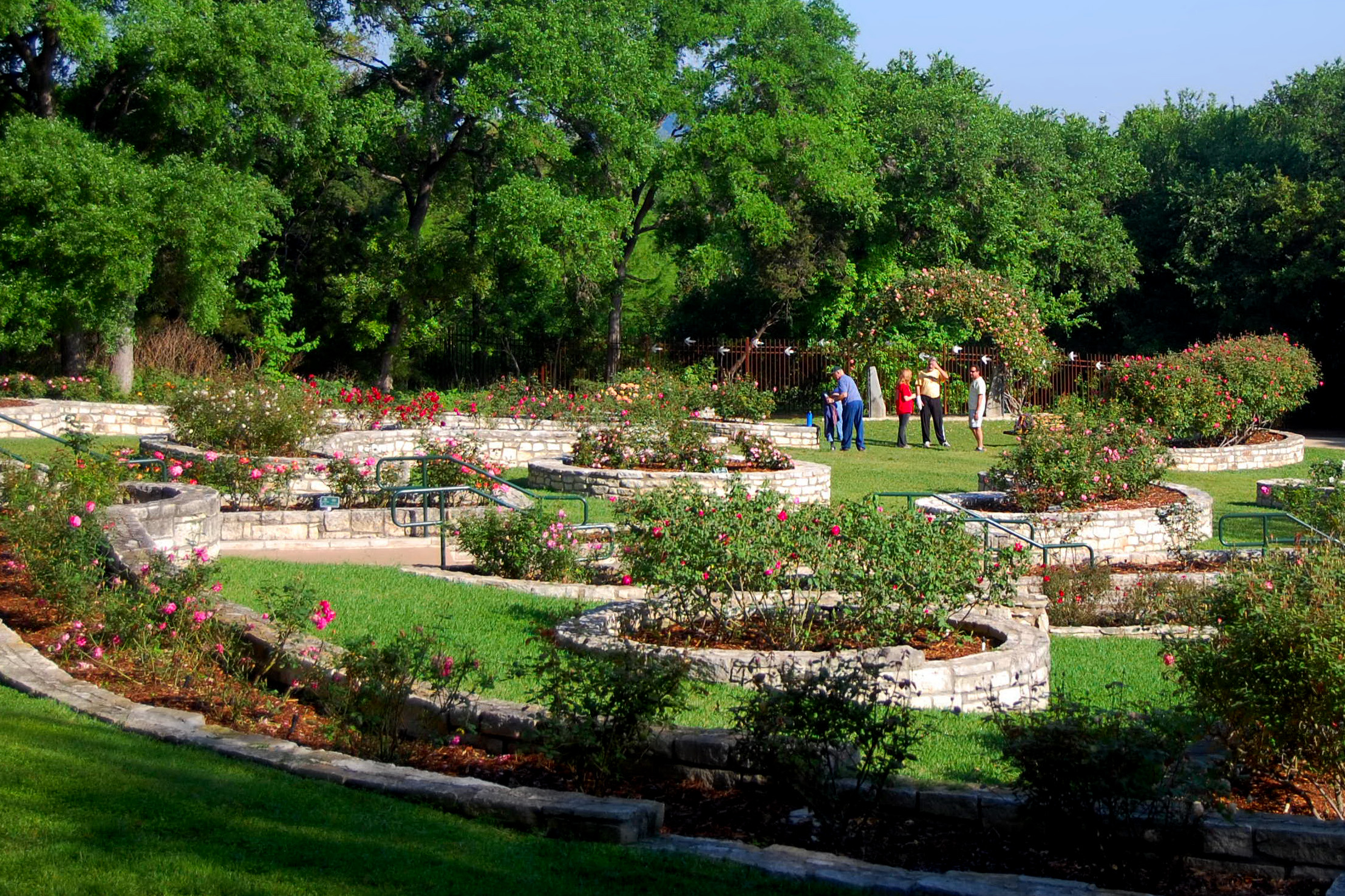
Mabel Davis Rose Garden

== See also ==
- List of botanical gardens in the United States
