= Mercer Botanic Gardens =

Botanical gardens in Harris County, Texas, United States

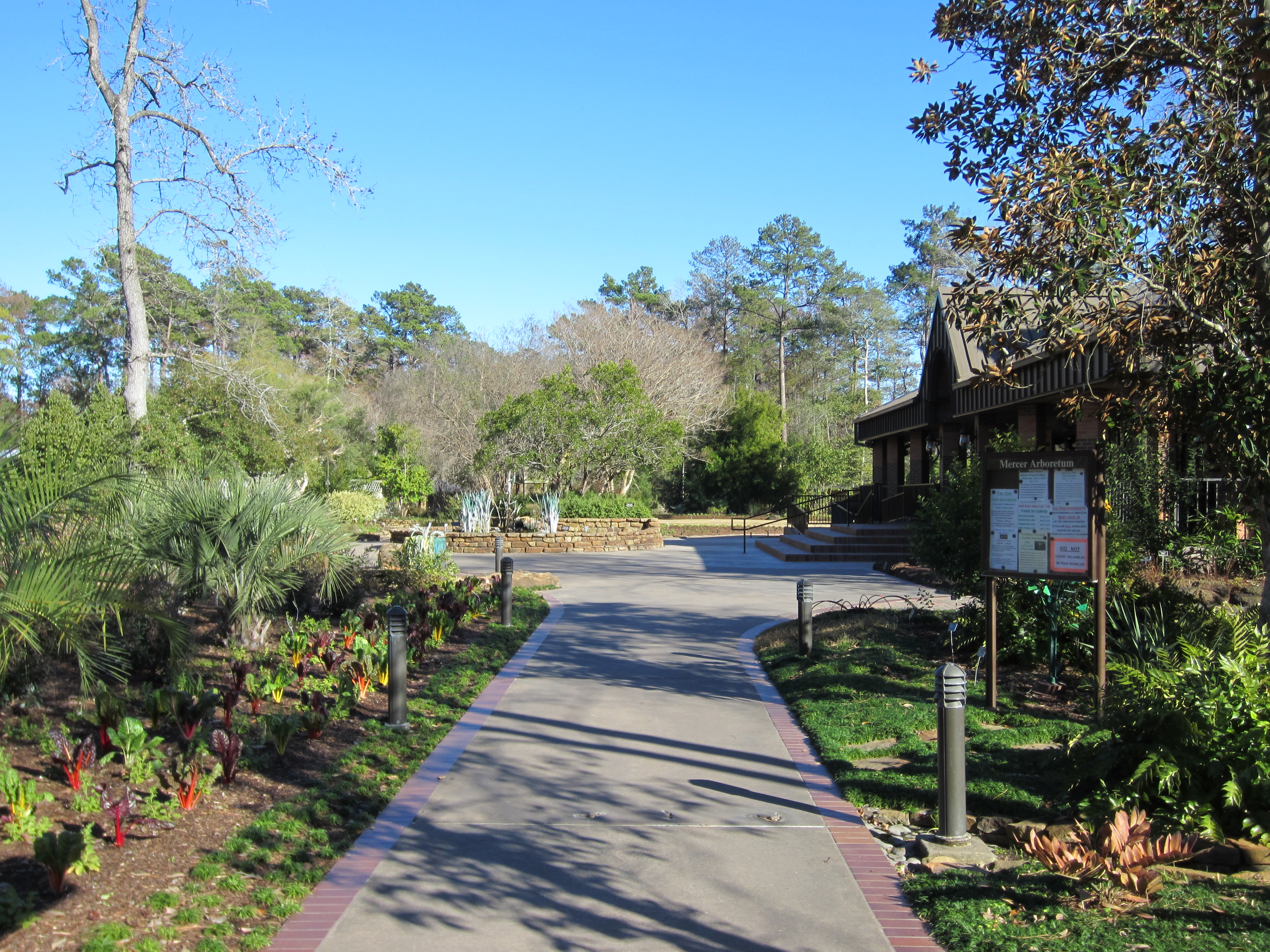
- Entrance to the Arboretum
- Interactive map of Mercer Botanic Gardens
- Type: Botanical garden
- Location: 22306 Aldine Westfield Road, Spring, Texas, US
- Area: 180 acres (0.73 km^{2})
- Website: www.pct3.com/mbg

Mercer Botanic Gardens (180 acres) is a public botanical gardens that includes landscaped garden beds and natural areas located at 22306 Aldine Westfield Road in northern Harris County, Texas, United States. The gardens are managed by Harris County Precinct 3 and open daily with free admission.

The mission of Mercer Botanic Gardens is to establish and maintain a versatile botanical facility for the greater Houston and Gulf Coast region that serves the public, horticultural industry, and scientific community.

== History ==
The gardens are named after Thelma and Charles Mercer, who purchased 14.5 acres (59,000 m^{2}) in the late 1940s for their home and garden. They preserved native trees such as dogwoods, cabbage palmettos, rusty blackhaw viburnum, and hawthorns, and introduced camellias and exotic tree species such as ginkgo, bauhinia, philadelphus, camphor, and tung oil.

The property was purchased by Harris County in 1974, and became the first park managed by Precinct 4. Harris County Precinct 4 expanded the property to eventually encompass about 400 acres of land, divided nearly evenly by Aldine Westfield with the botanic gardens on the east side and the arboretum on the west side of the road.

In 2023, Harris County initiated new precinct district lines based on the results of the 2020 Census. The park was split down Aldine Westfield Road. Harris County Precinct 1 took over management of the west side arboretum, and Harris County Precinct 3 gained control of the east side botanic gardens. Mercer Botanic Gardens now includes 180 acres (0.73 km^{2}).

== Features ==
The gardens feature several themed areas:

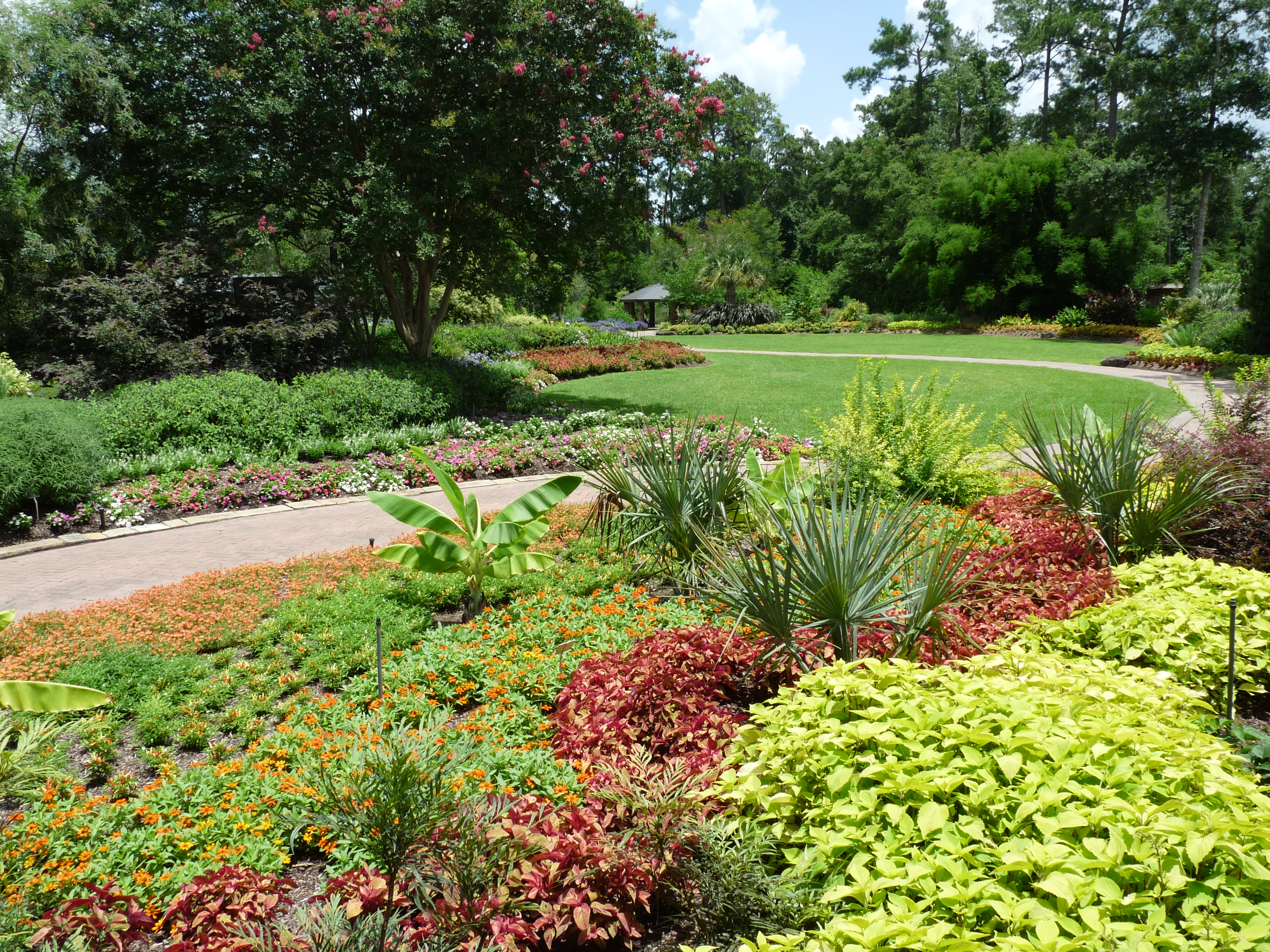
Garden bed at Mercer Botanic Gardens

- Endangered Species and Native Plant Garden
- Herb Garden
- Prehistoric Garden
- William D. Lee Iris Collection
- Pollinator Garden
- Vegetable Garden
- Seasonal Color Gardens
- Tropical Garden
- Ginger Garden
- Children's Garden
- Shakespeare Garden
- Pocket Prairie
- Shade Garden and Boardwalk
- Formal Garden

The grounds contain a variety of water features (including ponds, a waterfall, and a large Cypress pond called "Storey Lake"), walking paths, a primitive loop, greenhouses, a Japanese-inspiredtea house, and a visitor center with a classroom.

Mercer Botanic Gardens is also home to the Mercer Botanical Center (MBC), which maintains an herbarium, botanical library and illustrations collections and databases; a seed bank for the Center for Plant Conservation; labs and garden sign shop; and associated conservation nursery. MBC staff manage an off-site prairie preserve for the protection of a local federally listed species, Texas prairie dawn (Hymenoxys texana).

== Hurricane Harvey Damage ==
Mercer Botanic Gardens was still recovering from damage caused by the Tax Day Flood of 2016 (part of the April 2016 North American storm complex) when Hurricane Harvey hit in August 2017 and submerged the gardens under 10–12 feet of flood water. Most of the gardens, which border Cypress Creek, remained under water for days.

Plants and trees were destroyed by rushing water or suffocated by the days-long submersion in floodwater. Silt deposits from the creek buried the back section of the gardens and nature trails, with some piles as high as five feet. The gift shop, greenhouses, and utility equipment were destroyed. The visitor center and next-door Baldwin Boettcher Branch Library required full renovations. The visitor center reopened six years later in January 2023, and the library is scheduled to reopen in the summer of 2024.

== The Mercer Society ==
The Mercer Society, also known as the Friends of Mercer Botanic Gardens, supports garden programming through fundraising.

== Gallery ==
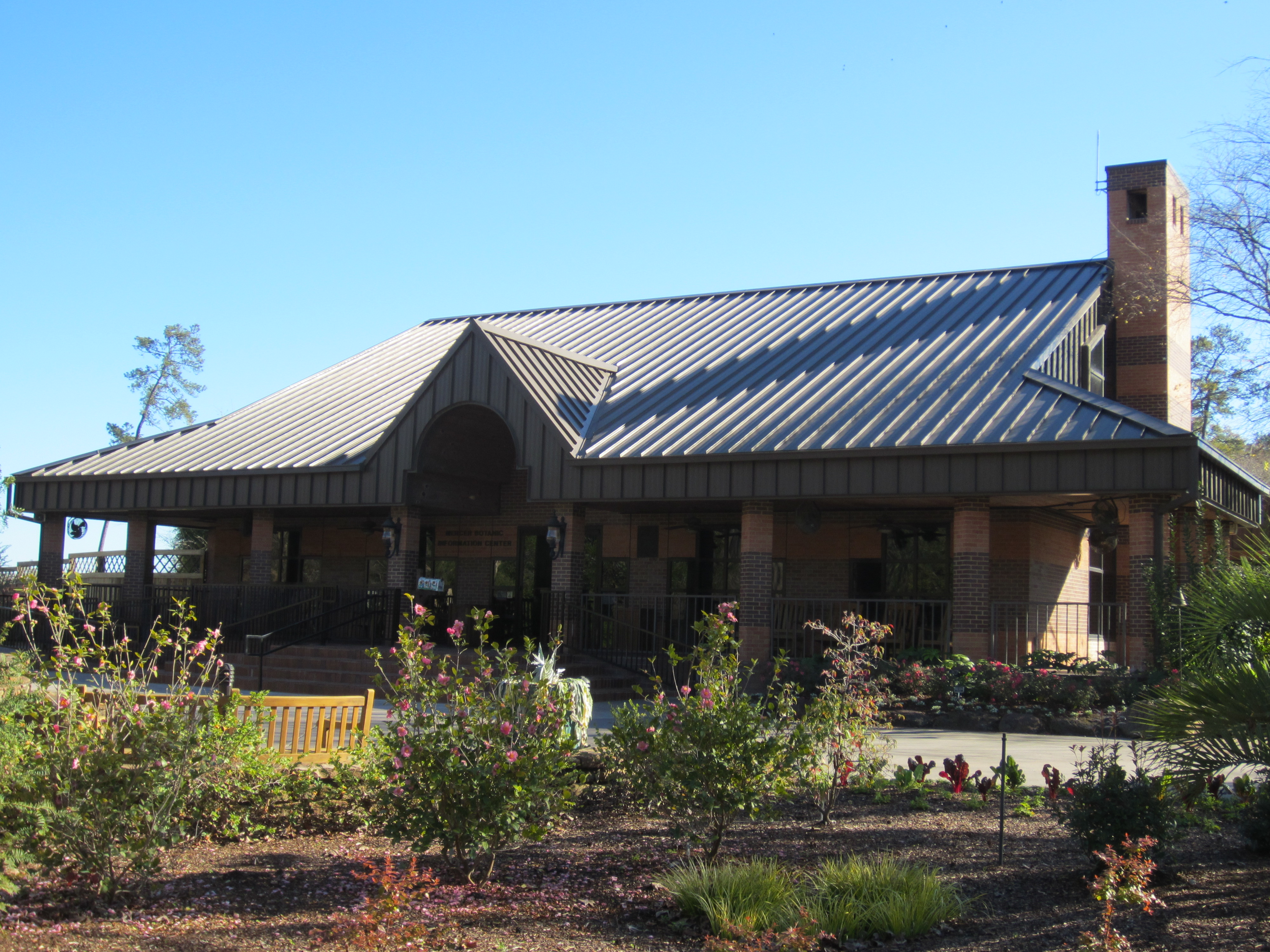
Mercer Botanic Information Center.

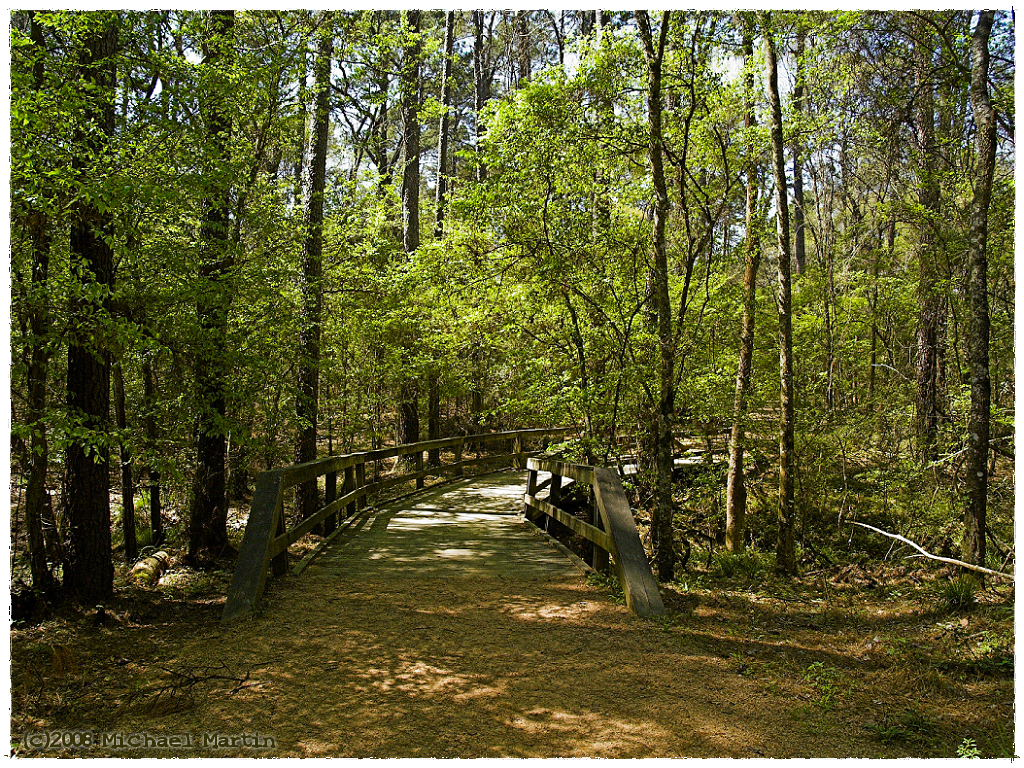
Hawthorne Loop.

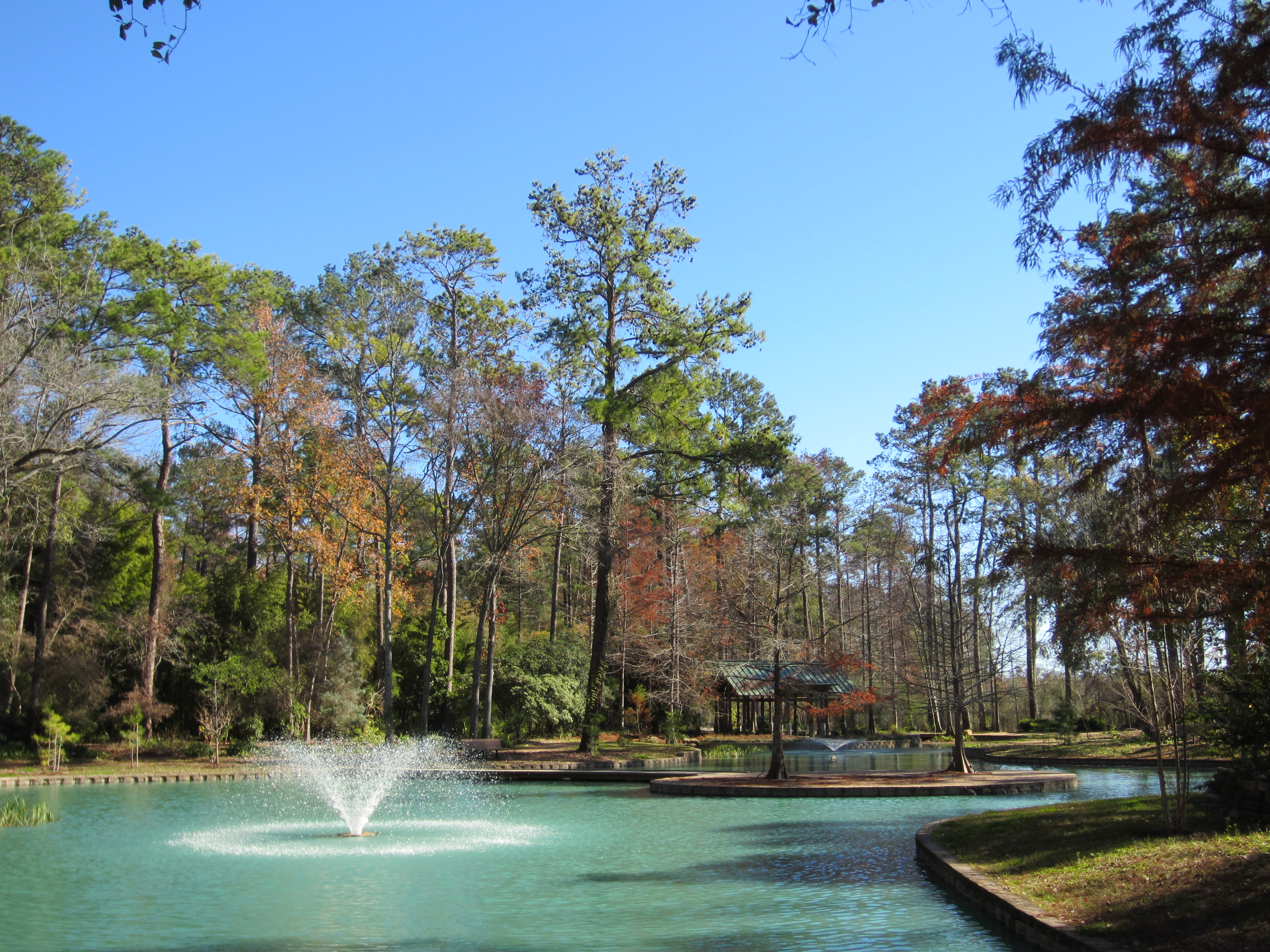
Storey Lake.

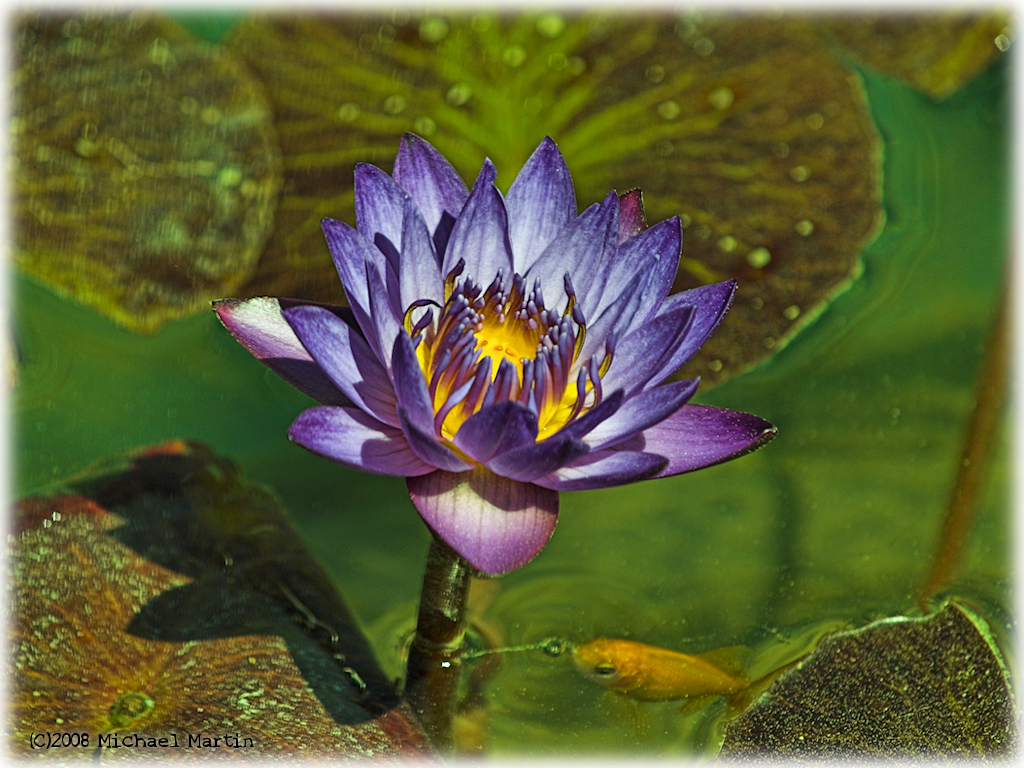
Water lily and fish in the Lily pool.

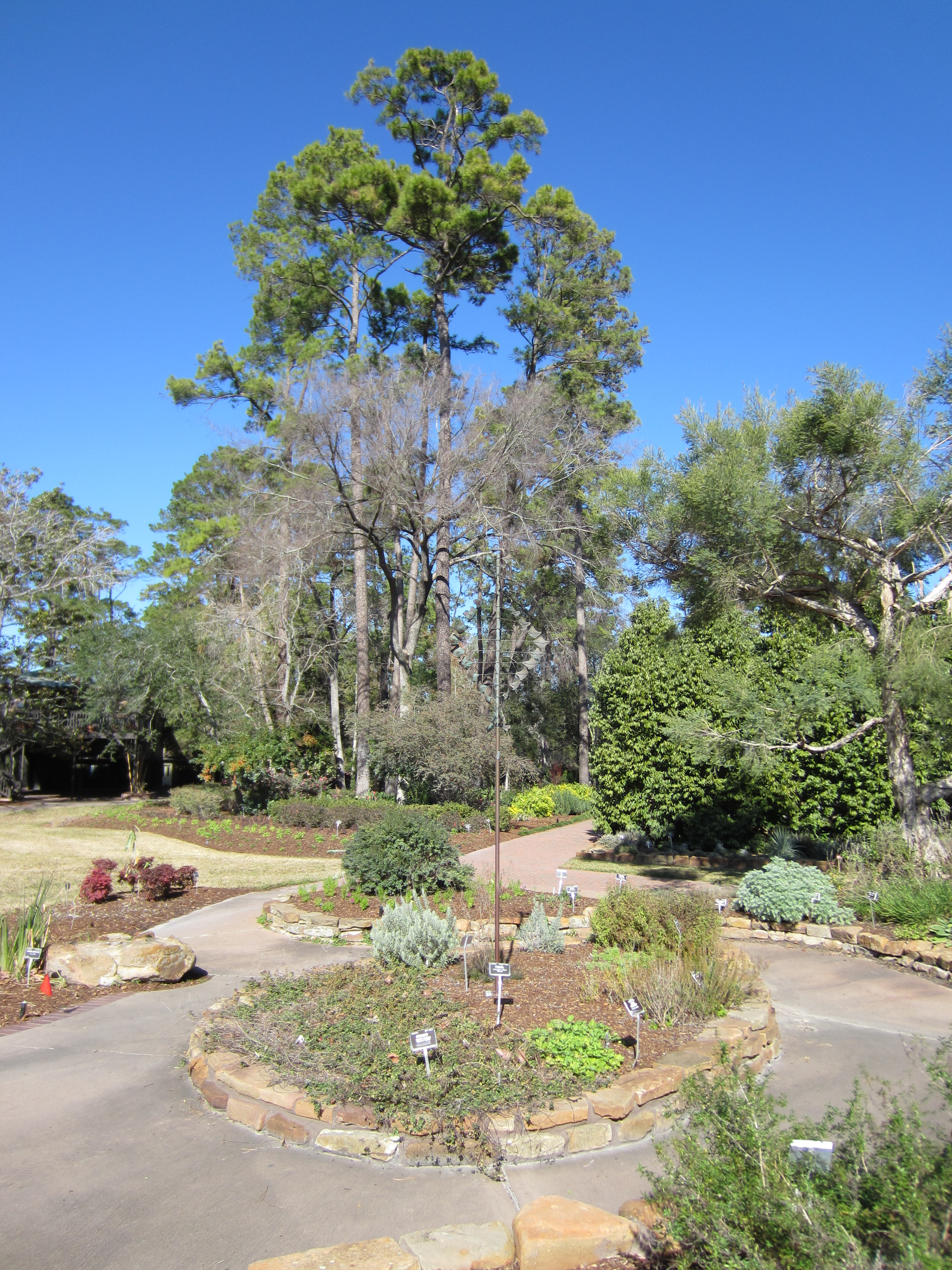
Part of a walking path.
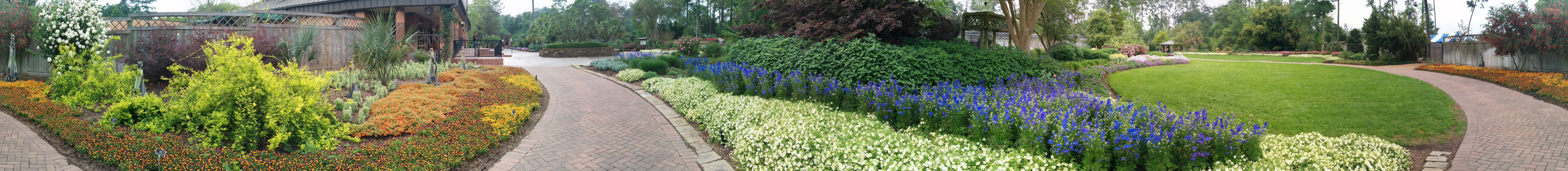
Panoramic view inside the gardens.

== See also ==
- List of botanical gardens in the United States
