= Hardman =

Hardman is an English surname and given name. It may refer to:

== People ==
- Hardman (surname)
- Hardman Earle, 1st Baronet (1792–1877), British railway magnate and slave trader
- Hardman Lever (1869–1947), British civil servant

== Places ==
- Hardman Islands, Louisiade Archipelago, Solomon Sea, Pacific; an island chain that is part of the country of Papua

=== United Kingdom ===
- Hardman Street, Liverpool, England, UK
- The Hardmans' House, Liverpool, England, UK; a National Trust property

=== United States ===
- Hardman, Oregon; an unincorporated community
- Hardman, Gilmer County, West Virginia; an unincorporated community
- Governor L. G. Hardman House, Commerce, Georgia; a NRHP-listed building
- Hardman Farm State Historic Site, Helen, Georgia

== Other uses ==
- Hardman & Co., a stained glass maker

== See also ==
- Hardman Peck, a piano maker
- Squire Hardman (disambiguation)
- Hardiman
