= Hartmann Group =

Public company

- Company type: Stock Company
- ISIN: DE0007474041
- Industry: Manufacturing
- Founded: 1818
- Founder: Ludwig von Hartmann
- Headquarters: Heidenheim an der Brenz, Heidenheim (district), Germany
- Key people: Britta Fünfstück (CEO); Fritz-Jürgen Heckmann (Chairman of the Supervisory Board)
- Revenue: €2.45 billion (2025)
- Operating income: 122,102,000 (2025)
- Net income: 65,800,000 (2025)
- Total assets: 2,161,000,000 (2025)
- Number of employees: 10,066 (2025)
- Website: www.hartmann.info

The Hartmann Group, headquartered in Heidenheim, Baden-Württemberg, Germany, is a manufacturer of medical and care products, as well as a provider of associated services. The company primarily operates in three core segments: Wound Care; Incontinence Management; and Infection Management (encompassing business areas Risk Prevention and Disinfection).

In 2025, the company achieved a revenue of €2.45 billion and employed 10,066 people.

== History ==
=== Foundation and beginnings ===
The origins of Hartmann date back to 1818 when Ludwig von Hartmann took over a mechanical spinning mill in Heidenheim, which soon became one of the largest cotton mills in Germany.

In 1843, Ludwig von Hartmann transferred the business to his three sons.

The Tübingen surgeon Victor von Bruns developed an absorbent dressing cotton made from cotton through degreasing and bleaching, known as Bruns's wool, in 1865.

In 1873, Paul Hartmann began the production of degreased dressing cotton in Heidenheim. The dressings, known as Lister's Carbol-Gauze, were impregnated with antiseptics using a method developed by Joseph Lister and demonstrated germicidal properties. Lister's contributions resulted in a decrease in post-operative infections, enhancing the safety of surgical procedures for patients. This earned Lister the title of "father of modern surgery."

=== Expansion and acquisitions ===
In 1912, the company was transformed into a stock company under general director Walther Hartmann, the grandson of the founder Ludwig von Hartmann.

In 2000, the Hartmann Group acquired KOB GmbH (Karl Otto Braun). In 2005, Hartmann established the subsidiary CMC Consumer Medical Care GmbH to produce cotton/cosmetics, medical products, baby care, and home care products. The following years saw further expansion; in April 2008, Kneipp GmbH became a wholly owned subsidiary, and in October of the same year, Hartmann acquired Bode Chemie GmbH, a Hamburg-based provider of disinfection, hygiene, and skin protection products.

=== Recent developments ===
In January 2019, Britta Fünfstück took over as the new CEO of the company. Shortly after her appointment, Fünfstück presented a transformation plan that included investments in new products and digital business models, as well as a stronger focus of sales on the end customer.

In August 2019, Safran Coating, a company producing silicone coatings, was acquired, which has since been operating under the name Advanced Silicone Coating.

In 2021, Hartmann acquired pflege.de, an online platform which offers guidance and services for home care as well as care aid supply.

In July 2023, the company announced its plans to make further investments in Germany, including a double-digit million-euro investment for the production facility in Herbrechtingen, where adult incontinence products are manufactured.

== Company structure ==
The Hartmann Group has its headquarters in Heidenheim, Germany and operates companies in 37 countries. The group produces and sells its products in over 130 countries worldwide. Its sales regions include Germany, EMEA (Europe excluding Germany, Middle East, Africa), the Americas, and APAC.

== Products ==
The Hartmann Group produces medical and care products in the three main areas of wound care, incontinence management, and infection management.

In the wound care segment, Hartmann produces products for wound treatment and dressings. The company provides various traditional and modern wound dressings, including silicone-coated options, superabsorbent dressings, postoperative dressings, and postoperative dressings.

The incontinence management segment focuses on absorbent products for various levels of incontinence. The company also offers hygiene and skin care products for patients with incontinence. The company has also published the Europe-wide study "Breaking the Silence", evaluating how adults communicate about and deal with incontinence.

The infection management segment includes two main areas: risk prevention and disinfection. For risk prevention, Hartmann offers sterile component sets, examination gloves and surgical products that include single-use instruments, clothing, and drapes. In the disinfection division, the company develops and manufactures products for hand hygiene as well as hand and surface disinfection.

The segment of complementary divisions of the group includes the corporate subsidiaries Kneipp, CMC, and KOB. Kneipp manufactures body care products, dietary supplements, and herbal medicines. CMC primarily distributes private label products in the areas of cosmetics, cotton, medical supplies, baby care, and home care. KOB produces medical textiles such as compression, fixation, support, or relief bandages.

== Sustainability ==
In 2020, the subsidiary Kneipp GmbH received the National German Sustainability Award in the “Pioneer” category for its lip balm Samtweich. In 2022, Kneipp was awarded a platinum ranking from EcoVadis for their resource-saving packaging initiatives.

== Sponsoring ==
The company is a sponsor of the local football club 1. FC Heidenheim 1846, whose men's team currently competes in the top tier of German football, the Bundesliga.
