= William Hartman Farmstead =

Historic house in New York, United States

- U.S. National Register of Historic Places
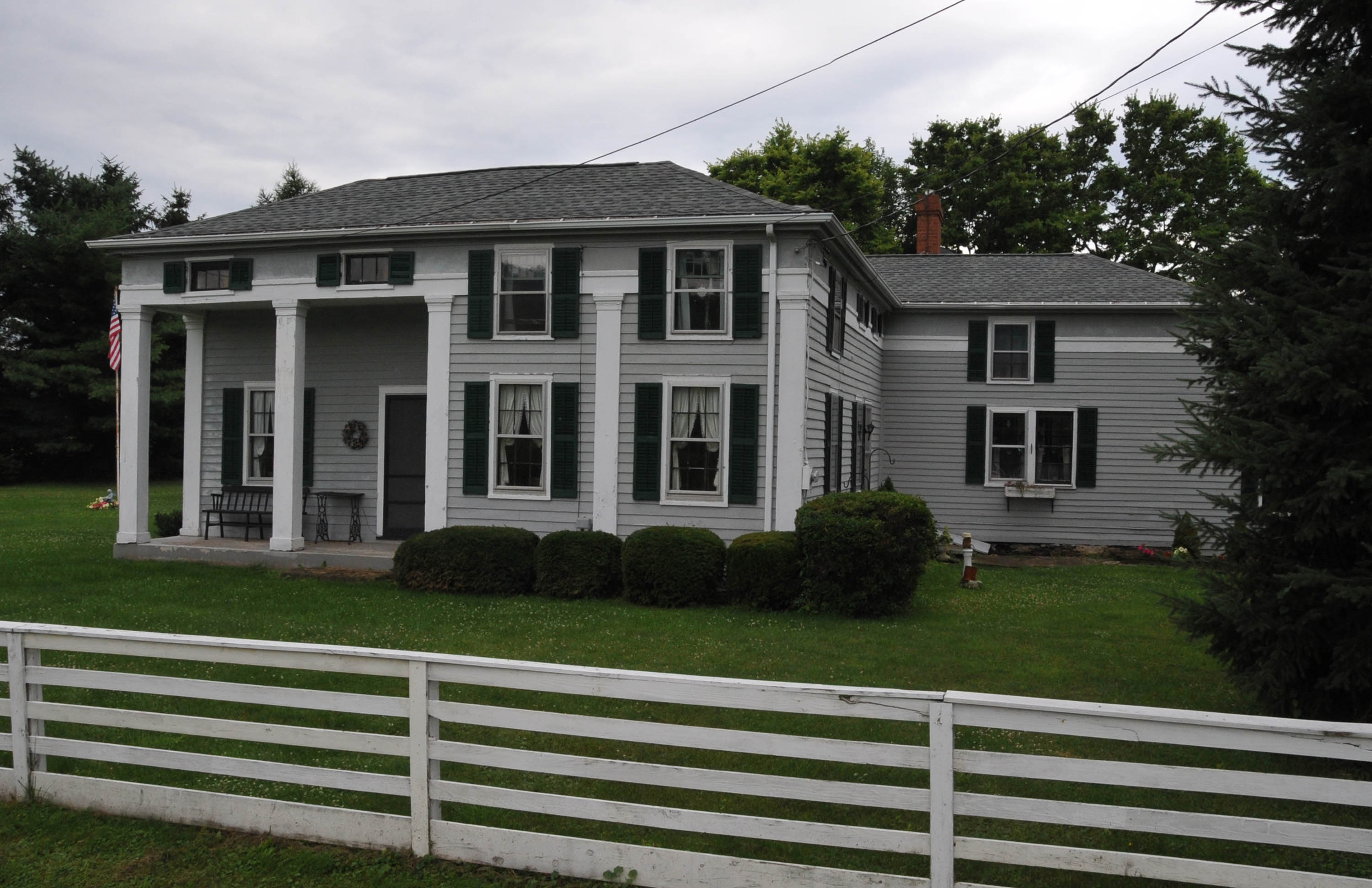

- Location within New York Location within the United States
- Nearest city: Dansville, New York
- Coordinates: 42°34′37″N 77°42′45″W
- Area: 4.3 acres (1.7 ha)
- Built: 1848
- Architectural style: Greek Revival
- NRHP reference No.: 00000381
- Added to NRHP: April 14, 2000

William Hartman Farmstead is a historic farmstead located at North Dansville near Dansville in Livingston County, New York. The farmstead includes a vernacular Greek Revival-style farmhouse, built about 1848–1850, and four contributing support structures all of which date from the mid- to late-19th century. The farmhouse is a 1 1/2-story, roughly L-shaped frame building resting on a stone foundation and sheathed in clapboard siding. Contributing structures are two barns, carriage house and chicken coop.

It was listed on the National Register of Historic Places in 2000.
