= Prosoniq =

German software developer

Prosoniq Products GmbH
- Industry: Software
- Founded: 1990
- Headquarters: Karlsruhe, Germany
- Key people: Stephan Bernsee, Bernhard Bouché
- Products: Audio software, DSP technology, Synthesizers
- Website: www.prosoniq.com

Prosoniq Products Software was a German software developer of audio and music tools, mostly known for their sonicWORX, OrangeVocoder, TimeFactory and Hartmann Neuron synthesizer products. It also licensed proprietary technologies in the audio/music DSP sector to software manufacturers including Emagic, Steinberg, Digidesign, TwelveTone Systems, Merging, DAVID, AutoDesk/Discreet and others. Headquartered in Karlsruhe, Germany, Prosoniq pioneered the use of artificial neural networks for commercial audio processing.

== History ==
Prosoniq was founded in 1990 by Stephan Sprenger (later married as Stephan Bernsee). It began as a privately held company involved in artificial neural network software development for medical applications. Stephan Bernsee, being a music enthusiast and an avid keyboard player, became interested in the application of artificial neural network processing to sound manipulation. He created an automatic audio morphing software for the ATARI 1040ST which was later ported to the Silicon Graphics computers and ultimately to the Apple Macintosh, for which it was sold under the name "sonicWORX" from 1994 to 2004. Distributed by Steinberg and bundled with Sony and Creative Labs hardware, sonicWORX reportedly reached a distribution of over 500,000 copies quickly becoming the most successful product of the company. However, with the PC becoming more popular in the 1990s, and sonicWORX being an Apple Macintosh-only software specifically optimized for Mac OS 9 it was finally discontinued in 2004.

In 1993, the company was acquired by the rapidly growing Under Cover Music Group (UCMG), founded by Joachim Keil, who drew benefits from custom tailored software solutions for their music production facilities and in turn provided funding for the future research and development of Prosoniq.

In 1995, the UCMG network had outgrown its company structure and was split into individual subsidiaries – Prosoniq became a separate company again. This was when Bernhard Bouché, a former colleague of Stephan Bernsee, joined the company. Both filled the position as CEO and CTO from 1995 to 2004.

In 2003, the UCMG who at that time held 54% shares in Prosoniq filed for insolvency, nearly killing Prosoniq in the process.

In 2004, Stephan Bernsee retired from the daily business at Prosoniq to concentrate on the development of new technologies at the DSP Dimension, leaving Bernhard Bouché in position as the CEO.

In 2008, Prosoniq released its OrangeVocoder and audio morphing algorithm as a Cocoa Audio Unit plug-in, as well as a Mac OS X version of its TimeFactory time stretching and pitch shifting software, all developed by their former CTO Stephan Bernsee.

At Musik Messe 2009, Prosoniq announced that it would discontinue all Windows software development starting June 2009. Since Prosoniq's CEO alluded that this decision was primarily due to piracy on the Windows platform this created a lot of controversy in the blogosphere. A revised version of the press release that came out a few days later tried to make it more clear that even though piracy was a major problem on both platforms. Prosoniq also announced a successor of its sonicWORX audio editing software designed to extract, process or suppress individual sounds, notes and instruments in a song. The software got widespread coverage in the media when they demonstrated its capabilities (and potential impact on the music industry) by extracting Peter Gabriel's voice from his famous song "Don't Give Up". According to its developer, sonicWORX Pro is based on their PANDORA technology developed in 1996, which allowed automatic suppression of voice in a mono or stereo mix. Limited by the processing power of desktop computers of that era and due to contracts that gave the exclusive right of use to an unknown party, the product was never developed into a fully featured end user product until 2009.

As of May 2010, Prosoniq sells a scaled down "sonicWORX Isolate" version that contains the key features demonstrated in the YouTube video at a reduced price. The Pro version with its additional modules has been announced for end of 2010.

Within the first days of the FIFA World Cup 2010, Prosoniq came out with a free "VuvuX" AudioUnit plug in to remove the Vuvuzela noise from the audio commentary without affecting speech and background atmosphere. According to their web site the plug in is not using a notch filter and is based on their sonicWORX de-mixing technology which utilizes statistical signal properties.

In September 2013, Prosoniq announced that it has sold its entire line of products, intellectual property, patent rights and research data to the Hannover-based Zynaptiq startup company, who will continue to offer and maintain their products in the future. Prosoniq also entered liquidation, a process by which a company is brought to an end, and the assets and properties of the company are to be redistributed. Stephan Bernsee, founder of Prosoniq came back as CEO to oversee the process. Liquidation ended in January 2016 with the dissolution of the corporation.

== Products and developments ==
- MCFE (Multi-Component Feature Extraction) analysis, a neural network-based adaptive time-frequency transform replacing the use of the Discrete Fourier Transform in their products
- automatic audio morphing algorithms
- polyphonic formant correction for pitch shifting applications
- PANDORA voice reduction software/vocal separator
- sonicWORX audio editing software
- TimeFactory polyphonic time stretching and pitch shifting algorithm "MPEX"
- Orange Vocoder VST/RTAS vocoder plug-in
- Hartmann Neuron synthesizer
- Hartmann NeuronVS synthesizer
- Magenta resynthesizer
- Rayverb inverse ray tracing room simulation
- Ambisone 3D audio effect
- Prosoniq morph audio morphing
- Dynasone Multiband Dynamics Compressor
- Pyramix Time Stretching
- Cakewalk Sonar Time Stretching
- Steinberg Nuendo Time Stretching

== Hartmann Music ==
In 2001, "Hartmann-Music", a joint-venture spin-off with designer Axel Hartmann was founded.

Some of the well known shareholders of this new company were former Waldorf Music CEO Wolfgang Düren, Axel Hartmann of Design-Box and composer Hans Zimmer. Hartmann-Music developed the Neuron synthesizer which was based on Prosoniq's artificial neural network technology to create "models" from sampled sounds and allow for extensive sound manipulation.

Despite winning many awards for innovation and having widespread support in the music industry Hartmann music had to file for insolvency in 2005, after a dispute over the product distribution rights with their former distributor.
