= Hartman Elementary School =

Hartman Elementary School may refer to:

- John T. Hartman Elementary School (Kansas City, Missouri) - Kansas City Missouri School District
- Hartman Elementary School (Omaha, Nebraska) - Omaha Public Schools
- Hartman Elementary School (currently Hartman Intermediate School (Ellwood City, Pennsylvania) - Ellwood City Area School District
- G. C. Hartman Elementary School (Cawatissa, Pennsylvania) - Southern Columbia Area School District
- Grace Hartman Elementary School (Rockwall, Texas, Dallas-Fort Worth area) - Rockwall Independent School District
- Hartman Elementary School (San Antonio, Texas) - Judson Independent School District
- R. F. Hartman Elementary School (Wylie, Texas) - Wylie Independent School District
