= Hartman Creek =

Stream in Butler County, Missouri, U.S.

Coordinates: 36.8683871°N 90.4673352°W

Hartman Creek is a stream in Butler County in the U.S. state of Missouri. It is a tributary of Widow Creek.

Hartman Creek has the name of the local Hartman family.

== See also ==
- List of rivers of Missouri
