= S v Hartmann =

South African legal case

S v Hartmann is an important criminal case in South African law, especially in respect of its implications for euthanasia. It was heard by Van Winsen J from March 19 to 20, 1975, in the Cape Provincial Division, with judgment handed down on March 21.

== Facts ==
The father of the accused suffered progressively and untreatably from carcinoma in his prostate, and thereafter from secondary cancer. In the terminal and emaciating stages of his illness, with no cure available, and suffering great pain, he was induced by his son, a doctor, to come with him to Ceres Hospital, where he was given heavy doses of morphine and pentothal, and died within seconds. His son was charged with murder.

== Findings ==
The court found that the accused had had no desire to end his father's life; his motives were compassionate, directed at the relief of his father's pain and the termination of his pitiable state. He had been aware, however, that his actions would end his father's life, and therefore had sufficient murderous intention, dolus directus, for legal purposes.

Generally speaking, the consent of the deceased is no defence to murder in South African law. Hartmann's father, of course, had been in no state to consent; had he been, however, it would have made no difference. Euthanasia is unlawful in South Africa, in that it amounts to murder. It was necessary, therefore, for the court to convict Hartmann of that crime.

The judge concluded, however, that "this is a case, if ever there was one, in which, without having to be unfair to society, full measure can be given to the element of mercy." Hartmann was sentenced to one year in prison, nearly all of it suspended. He was detained until the rising of the court, after which he was free to leave.
