= Hartmann Neuron =

Electronic musical instrument

Neuron
- Manufacturer: Hartmann
- Dates: 2003
- Price: USD 5000, at introduction

Technical specifications
- Polyphony: 16–48 voices
- Timbrality: 4–16
- Oscillator: 2 (Resynators)
- Synthesis type: Neural Network Resynthesis
- Aftertouch expression: Yes
- Velocity expression: Yes
- Storage memory: 200+200 locations, 256MB SDRAM, 20GB HDD
- Effects: 2x multi

Input/output
- Keyboard: 61-key
- Left-hand control: Joystick, Wheel, Dial
- External control: MIDI

The Hartmann Neuron was an electronic musical instrument designed and built by industry designer Axel Hartmann of the German company Hartmann Music in the years 2001–2005. The Neuron synthesizer used an Artificial Neural Network to create a digital computer model from sampled sounds, implementing a new synthesis technology which was developed by Stephan Bernsee at Prosoniq. This computer model could then be used to resynthesize a new sound, giving the player control over "musical" aspects such as instrument body size, material and other acoustic properties. This parametric approach is very different from the more mathematical approaches of other synthesizers. The Hartmann Neuron VS, a Mac/Windows compatible VST software version of the instrument, was released in 2005.

== Critique ==
Even though the instrument was awarded numerous prizes for innovation it was difficult to operate due to its limited display capabilities, which made adjusting the tonal qualities of a sound a tedious trial and error process. Given the very high price of the instrument (around 5000 USD) many people felt that manipulating a wireframe model of a sound only by ear did not allow for the amount of control necessary for such a complex operation. However, combined with a sample editor, the included Modelmaker software & MIDI control via sequencing, this difficulty can be somewhat rectified, albeit without the aid of the 3D image of the model.

Hartmann Music had to fight a couple of technical problems which were never remedied before the company finally filed for insolvency, after a dispute with their distributor, in 2005. Although Hartmann Music went out of business, the Neuron synthesizer is still a sought after, hard-to-find instrument with unique sound. It is still being used today, mainly in the production of film music, for example by artists like Hans Zimmer and electronic musicians such as BT.

== Technology ==
The Neuron synthesizer's hardware was based around a standard PC mainboard running an early version of the Gentoo Linux operating system. A custom application ran the sound synthesis algorithm, and the instrument used custom front panel displays and a custom sound card. The front panel and the casing of the synthesizer were designed by Axel Hartmann. It featured 3 orange stick controllers which allowed simultaneous manipulation of 2 assignable parameters (X/Y direction). There were 2 oscillators per voice (called "Resynators") which were split in two parameter groupings: "Scape" would refer to the generation properties of a sound (such as the excitation source in a real instrument), "Sphere" would contain all parameters referring to the properties of the resonating "instrument" body. The two Resynators could be combined and put through a "Blender", which allowed different modes to be applied in the combination. The Neuron synthesizer also had an effects unit with EQ, delay, modulation, distortion, ring modulation, reverb and spectral warping effects, a digital filter with variable cutoff frequency, resonance and selectable characteristics, and assignable control wheels.

== Construction ==
Internally, the motherboard is a Shuttle MV25(N) Socket 370, VIA Apollo chipset with an Intel Celeron CPU, heatsink & fan. The motherboard can accept up to 2x 512MB of non-ECC PC133 SDRAM, although the system comes with 256MB as standard. The hard disk is a PC standard 20GB IDE unit. The audio & data PCI i/o board is a custom Hartmann design & on-ribbon includes; MIDI, USB & the first 5.1 surround sound hardware to be incorporated into a hardware synthesiser. The PSU is a non-ATX design, although the exhaust fan is a standard PC part. The exhaust fan, however, is noisy in operation and may not be acceptable in the confines of a soundproofed mixing room. Externally, the casing is extremely solid, heavy-duty aluminium chassis with a wooden end panel. The one drawback are the four delicate plastic joysticks. However, these can be removed for transport.

== Prominent musicians ==
- Michael Cretu – German musician (born 1957)
- Peter Gabriel – British musician (born 1950)
- Manfred Mann – South African-born musician (born 1940)
- Luis Resto – American producer and songwriter (born 1961)
- Robert Scott Thompson – American composer (born 1959)
- Brian Transeau – American musician (born 1971)
- Martino Traversa – Italian composer (born 1960)
- Hans Zimmer – German film composer (born 1957)
