= Brødrene Hartmann =

Coordinates: 55°46′19.17″N 12°30′33.61″E

Brødrene Hartmann A/S
- Type: Private
- ISIN: DK0010256197
- Industry: Manufacturing, Packaging
- Founded: Denmark (1917)
- Headquarters: Gentofte, Denmark
- Key people: Torben Rosenkrantz-Theil, CEO; Henrik Marinus Pedersen, Chairman; Kenneth Kongsgaard Kristensen, CFO
- Products: Moulded Fibre Egg Packaging, Machinery and Equipment
- Revenue: 3,810 million DKK (2024)
- Number of employees: 3,064 (2024)
- Website: https://www.hartmann-packaging.com

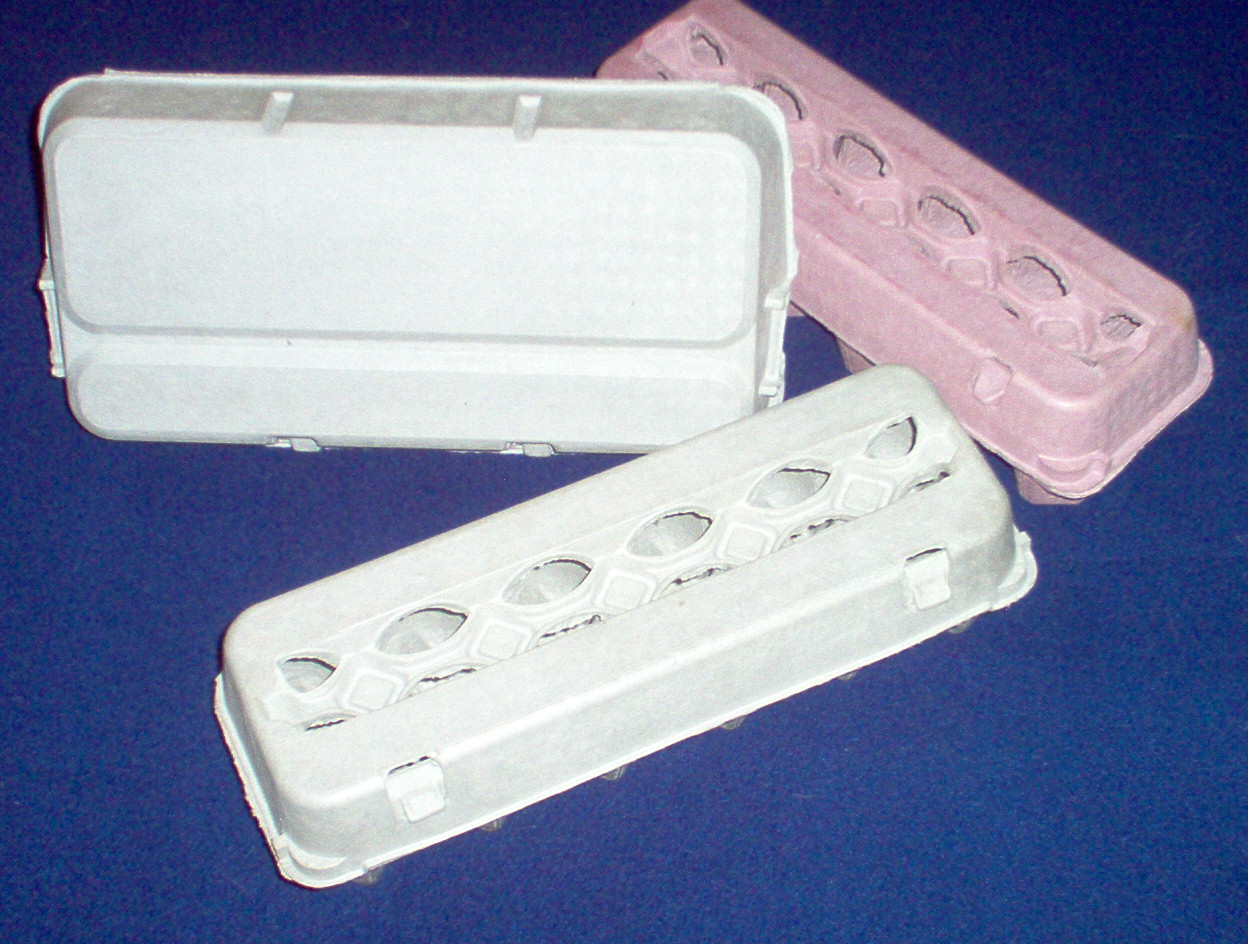

Brødrene Hartmann A/S is the world’s leading manufacturer of moulded-fibre egg packaging, a market-leading manufacturer of fruit packaging in South America and India and the world’s largest manufacturer of technology for the production of moulded-fibre packaging.

Hartmann has 18 factories in Europe and Israel, North and South America, India, China, Malaysia, and Russia (discontinuing).

== History ==
Brødrene Hartmann A/S was founded in 1917 by Louis, Carl and Gunnar Hartmann. The three brothers inherited their father's paper bag plant in Kongens Lyngby. By 1936, Brødrene Hartmann was producing moulded fibre packaging products in Denmark.

The company's group revenue increased to DKK 3,810 million in 2024. Operating profit was DKK 570 million corresponding to a profit margin of 15%. Investments increased to DKK 402 million.

== Corporate governance ==
=== Board of directors ===
- Henrik Marinus Pedersen, Chairman
- Michael Strange Midskov, Member and Vice Chairman
- Marianne Schelde, Board Member
- Klaus Bysted Jensen, Board Member, Employee Elected
- Palle Skade Andersen, Board Member, Employee Elected

=== Executive Board ===
- Torben Rosenkrantz-Theil, CEO
- Kenneth Kongsgaard Kristensen, CFO
