= Blowitz =

Blowitz may refer to:

- German: Blovice
- Henri Blowitz, Bohemian journalist
