= Heidenmauer =

Heidenmauer is German for "heathen wall" and may refer to:

- Heidenmauer (Palatinate), a Celtic ringwork in Rhineland-Palatinate, Germany
- The Heidenmauer, a novel by James Fenimore Cooper
