= Fête des Vignerons =

Event in Vevey, Switzerland

Coordinates: 46°27′35″N 6°50′32″E

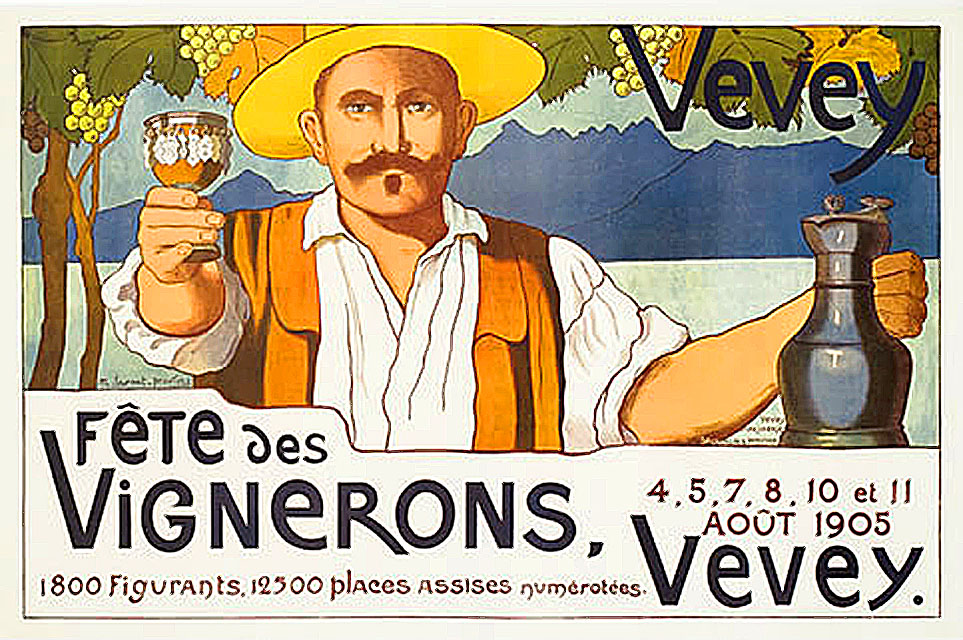
- Fête des Vignerons poster, 1905
- Frequency: Once in a generation
- Locations: Vevey, Switzerland
- Inaugurated: 1797
- Most recent: July–August 2019
- Organiser: Confrérie des Vignerons

Winegrowers' Festival in Vevey
- UNESCO Intangible Cultural Heritage
- Country: Switzerland
- Reference: 01201
- Region: Europe and North America

Inscription history
- Inscription: 2016 (11th session)
- List: Representative

The Fête des Vignerons (French: [fɛt de viɲ(ə)ʁɔ̃]; lit. 'Winegrowers' Festival') is a traditional festival which takes place in Vevey, Switzerland.

It has been organised by the Confrérie des Vignerons ('Brotherhood of Winegrowers') in Vevey since 1797. The organising committee is free to choose how often the festival takes place, but the idea is that it is held once in a generation. Up to now, the interval between two festivals has varied between 14 and 28 years. The most recent festival took place in July and August 2019, 20 years after the preceding one (1999).

The festival features a show celebrating the world of winemaking; performances take place in the Vevey marketplace on the shores of Lake Geneva, and other festivities are organised around the town. Since 2016, the Fête des Vignerons has been included in UNESCO's intangible cultural heritage.

The 2019 edition of the festival was recommended as one of National Geographic's "world's most exciting destinations", one of The New York Times's "places to go in 2019" and was listed in The Guardian's "Where to go in 2019" list.

== History ==
=== Origins ===
The origin of the Fête des Vignerons lies in the processions of the Vevey Confrérie des Vignerons. These processions are believed to have started in the Middle Ages. At that time, the Confrérie des Vignerons was called the Abbaye de l'Agriculture. In 1647 the Abbaye de l'Agriculture was only a small association. It grew during the 18th century and by 1776 almost a quarter of Vevey's male population had become members. It was never a gathering of vineyard workers, as its current name would suggest, but of landholders who entrusted the care of their vineyards to those workers. A small group of experts from the Confrérie visited the vines at different times of year to judge and classify the quality of work of the winegrowers, an activity that continues to this day. The Abbot-Presidents (presidents of the council of the Confrérie) were, and still are, most often members of the City Councils, lawyers, notaries or judges.

Around 1770 the Confrérie des Vignerons decided on its aim of encouraging improvements in winegrowing and rewarding the vineyard workers' good results, instead of concentrating on any possible failings. The best vineyard workers paraded through the town of Vevey together with members of the Confrérie. The archives of the Confrérie des Vignerons first record a parade in 1651, but it is probable that the parades started before that date. The parade followed a general meeting where the vineyard workers' results were commented on and criticised and was followed by a banquet. The parades took the form of a pageant, with musicians and singers. In 1730 the parade included a small boy on top of a wine barrel playing the role of Bacchus. From 1741, the parades were held every three years. In 1747, a second theatrical character was added to the parade with a young apprentice playing the role of Ceres, goddess of wheat and the harvest.Other characters who have become traditional elements of the Fête des Vignerons appeared in the following years; Noah (the very first winegrower), people carrying the grapes of Canaan, priests and priestesses from Greek mythology, basket-bearers (kanephoros) and a group of fauns and bacchantes. The parade of 1783 included Silenus, riding a donkey. In 1791, a coronation ceremony was added at the end of the parade to honour the best vineyard workers. Six years later, on 9 August 1797, the coronation ceremony was combined into a staged spectacle. The costumed participants of the parade entered the Vevey marketplace where a platform and two thousand seats had been erected. The dances and songs were performed in the marketplace before the participants headed into the town, repeating the songs and dances along the parade. The spectacle and the parade were divided into the four seasons; first Spring with the god Pales, then Summer with Ceres, Autumn with Silenus and finally Winter with Noah and a village wedding celebration. This was the origin of the elaborate celebrations which continue to this day.

=== 19th century ===
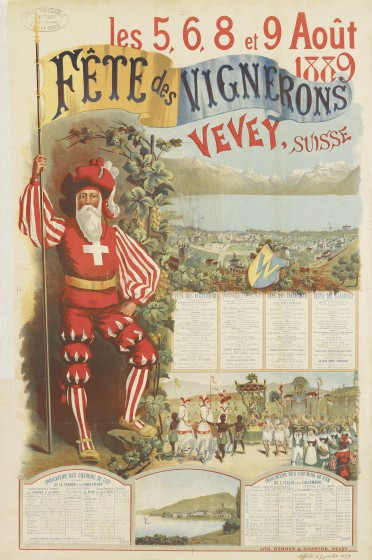
Poster of the 1889 Fête des Vignerons

Due to the unrest of the Vaudoise Revolution, then the Napoleonic Wars, the following years did not allow for a new celebration. It would take twenty-two years, until 1819, before a new celebration was organized. The 1819 celebration took place from August 5 to 6 presided over by Abbot-President Louis Levade who had presided over the first staged spectacle in 1797. About 730 actors and performers participated in a 2,000-seat arena. As the canton of Vaud had recently joined the Swiss Confederation, the theme of this first 19th century celebration glorified tradition and patriotism. The traditional song "Ranz des vaches" was sung for the first time at the Fête des Vignerons. The organiser Counsellor Walther, considered that the spectacle had become complicated enough to need a director, the dance master David Constantin, and a musical director, David Glady, who selected and arranged the music and texts.

The third Fête des Vignerons took place from 8 to 9 August 1833 under the direction of Abbot-President Vincent Doret. About 780 actors and performers participated in a 4,000-seat arena, once again organised by Counsellor Walther under the direction of David Constantin. Walther commissioned Samuel Glady (son of David Glady) to compose original music to complement songs from the traditional repertoire. Costumes were designed by Theophile Steinlen.

In 1851, the fourth Fête des Vignerons was held from 7 to 8 August under the direction of the Abbot-President François Déjoux. François Grast was engaged to write a complete musical score, giving the fourth Fête a stylistic unity and bringing the music and staging to the fore. About 900 actors and performers participated in an 8,000-seat arena under the direction of Benjamin Archinard. This was the first time that the Ancients Swiss troop, previously intended to supervise the procession, marched.

François Grast also composed the music for the next Fête des Vignerons, which took place from 26 to 27 July 1865 under Abbot-President Louis Bonjour. About 1,200 actors and performers participated in a 10,500-seat arena. Benjamin Archinard was dancing master as at the previous festival with Pierre Lacaze responsible for costumes and staging. As the celebration grew it became more difficult to finance and had to rely on a public subscription for one third of its budget.

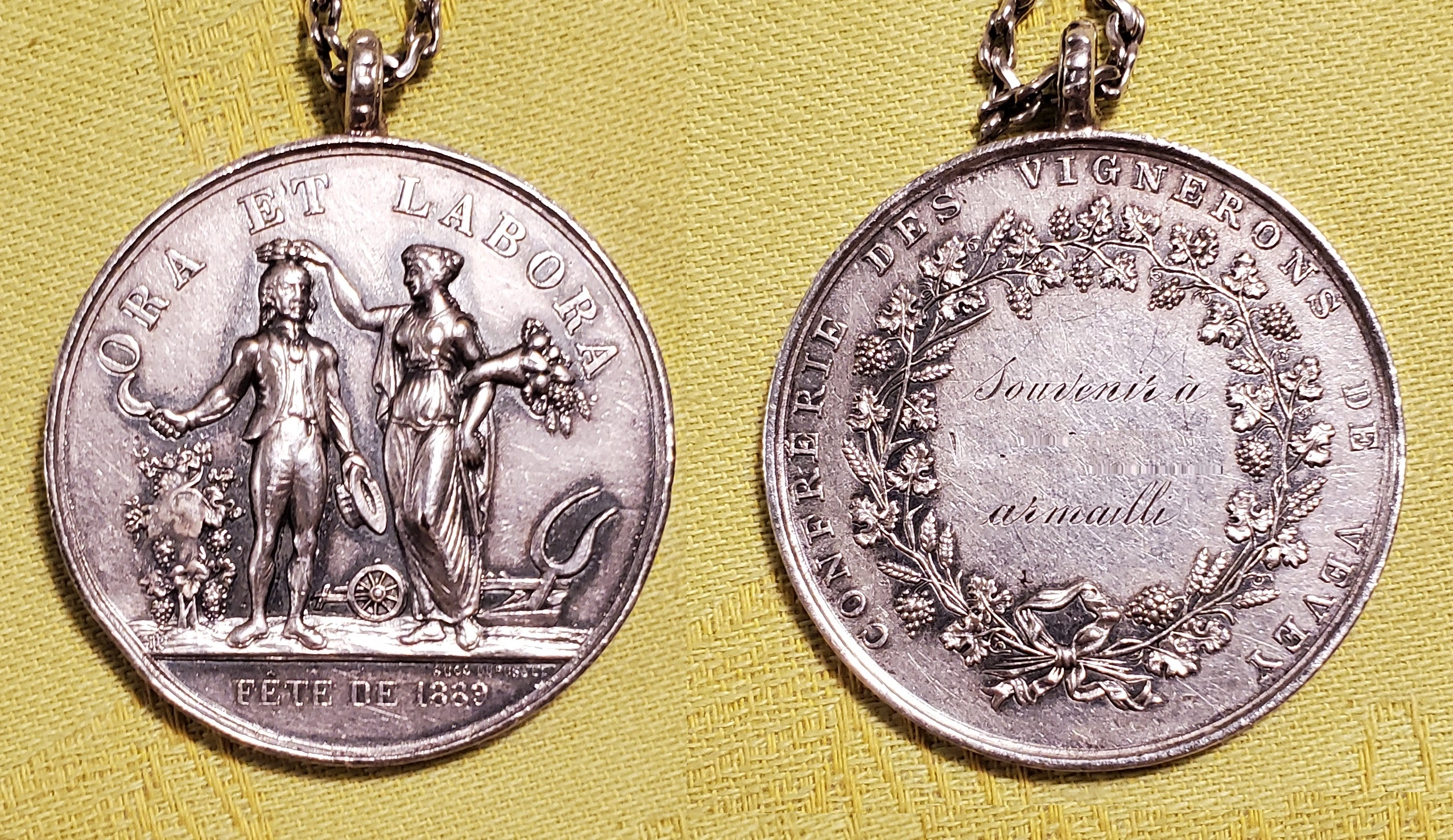
Medal of the 1889 festival assembled as a pendant.

From 5 to 9 August 1889, the sixth Fête des Vignerons was held under the direction of the Abbot-President (and former President of the Confederation) Paul Ceresole. On this occasion, the show was staged by Ernest Burnat to the music of Hugo de Senger and brought together 1,379 actors and performers in a 12,000-seat arena. This was the first time that the "Ranz des vaches" had been performed by a soloist, Placid Curtat, and not by a choir of armaillis. The highly acclaimed performance of the soloist showed the symbolic function of this song in the festival and established the close link between Vevey and the heights of the Veveyse District and the Gruyère District.

=== 20th century ===
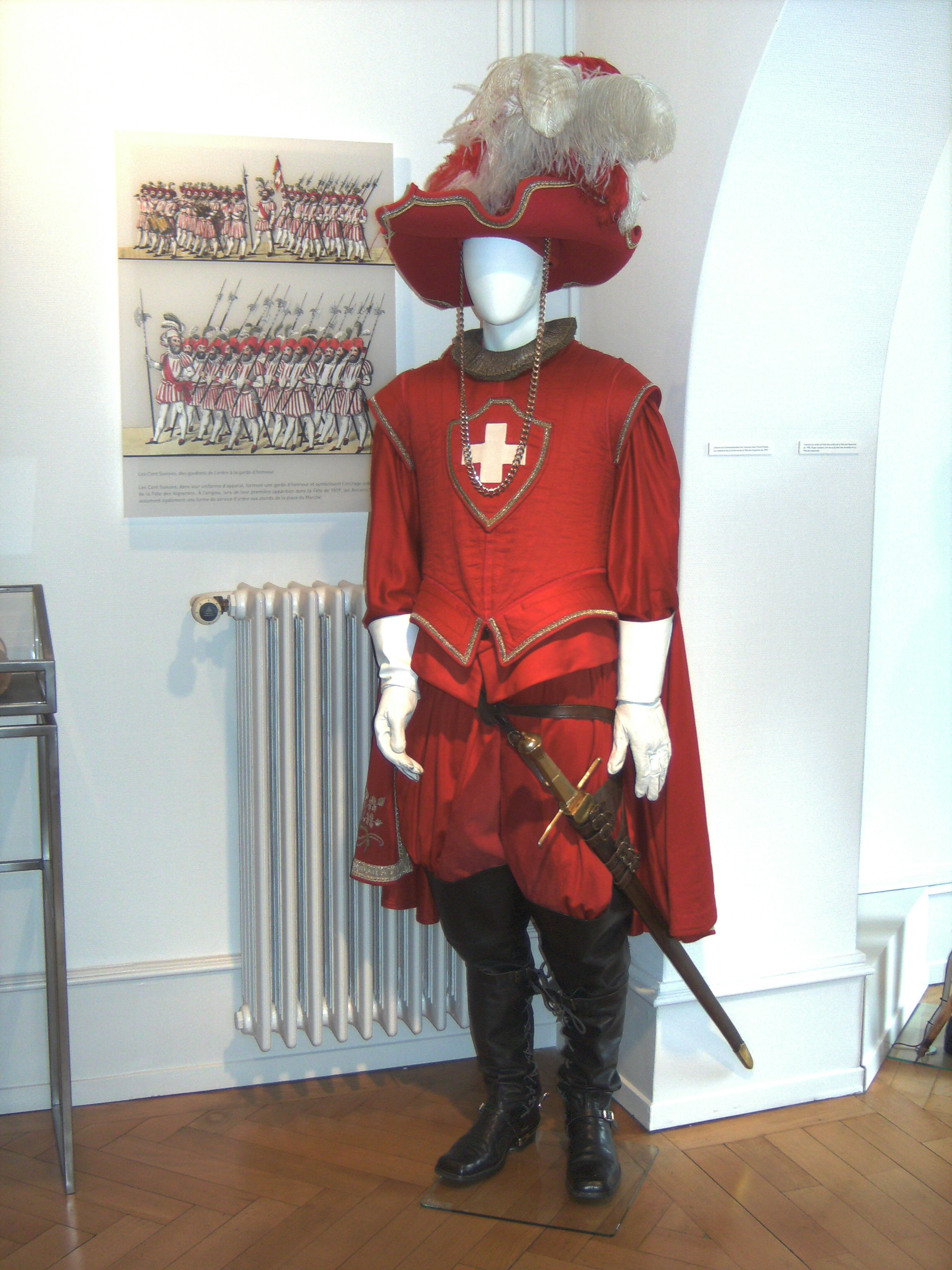
Ancient Swiss costume, 1999

The seventh Fête des Vignerons took place from 4 to 9 August 1905. The Abbot-President at the time was the national councillor Emile Gaudard. René Morax wrote the libretto and directed the spectacle. Gustave Doret composed the music. The 1905 Fête des Vignerons was notable in that the procession become a secondary element as well as being the first celebration not to restrict the participation of women and girls. About 1,800 actors and performers participated in an arena with 12,500 seats.

From 1 to 9 August 1927, the eighth Fête des Vignerons was presided over by the same Abbot-President as the previous one, Emile Gaudard, then Switzerland's delegate to the League of Nations. The production was directed by Edouard Vierne (René Morax declined the invitation), replaced by A. Durec a few weeks before the event, while the music was composed as at the previous celebration by Gustave Doret with a libretto by Pierre Girard. The costumes and scenery were designed by Ernest Bieler and the choreographer was Georges Meriadec. About 2,000 performers participated, gathered in a 14,000-seat arena inspired by a medieval city surrounded by a wall and towers.

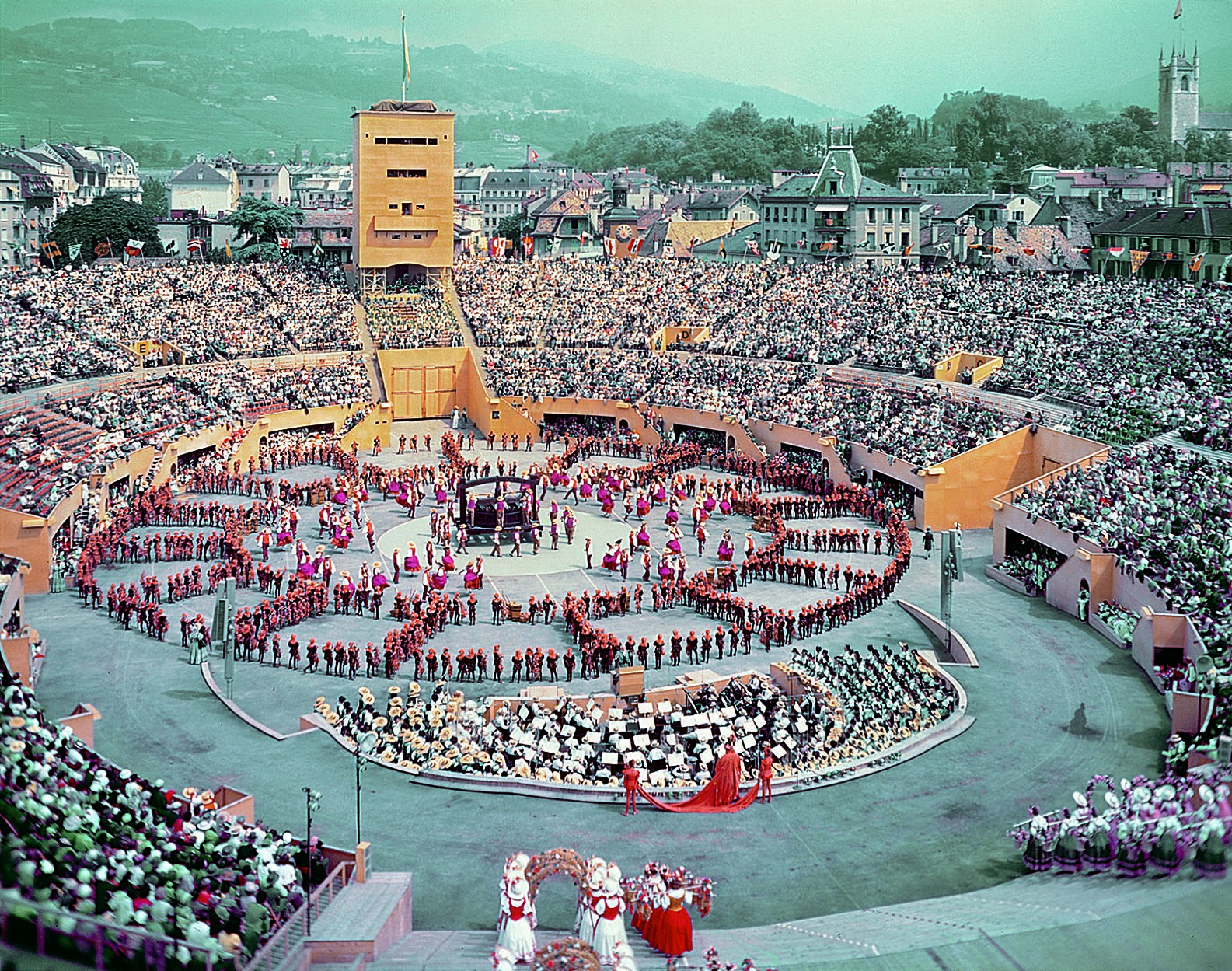
The amphitheatre in 1955

In 1955, the Fête des vignerons took place from August 1 to 15, presided over by the Abbot-President David Dénéréaz. In a context of increasing entertainment possibilities, barely a decade after the end of the Second World War, the organisation became more professional: it was the first festival to have an international focus, more than doubling its capacity compared to the previous one (the first performances were not entirely sold out, but additional ones were organised following their success). The show was directed by Oscar Eberlé to music by Carlo Hemmerling and a libretto by Géo H. Blanc. 3,850 performers participated in a 16,000-seat arena. The 1955 edition was the first to organize night performances.

From 30 July to 14 August 1977, the tenth Fête des Vignerons was presided over by the Abbot-President Philippe Dénéréaz. It was directed by Charles Apothéloz with music by Jean Balissat and a libretto by Henri Debluë. The sets and costumes were designed by Jean Monod. André Charlet directed the choirs and orchestra. 4,250 performers participated in a 15,776-seat arena organized around a large solar clock with four cardinal points indicating the four seasons.

The 1999 Fête des Vignerons took place from 29 July to 15 August. Presided over by the Abbot-President Marc-Henri Chaudet, it was directed by François Rochaix with music by Jean-François Bovard, Michel Hostettler and Jost Meier. The libretto was by François Debluë (nephew of the 1977 librettist Henri Debluë) while Jean-Claude Maret directed the scenography and Catherine Zuber was responsible for the costumes. The show featured "Arlevin", a winemaker representing the crowned winemakers (the coronation only took place during the first performance). 5,050 performers participated in a 16,000-seat arena. On 11 August the audience was able to see, during the show, the only total solar eclipse of the decade.

Models of amphitheatres from the second half of the 20th century

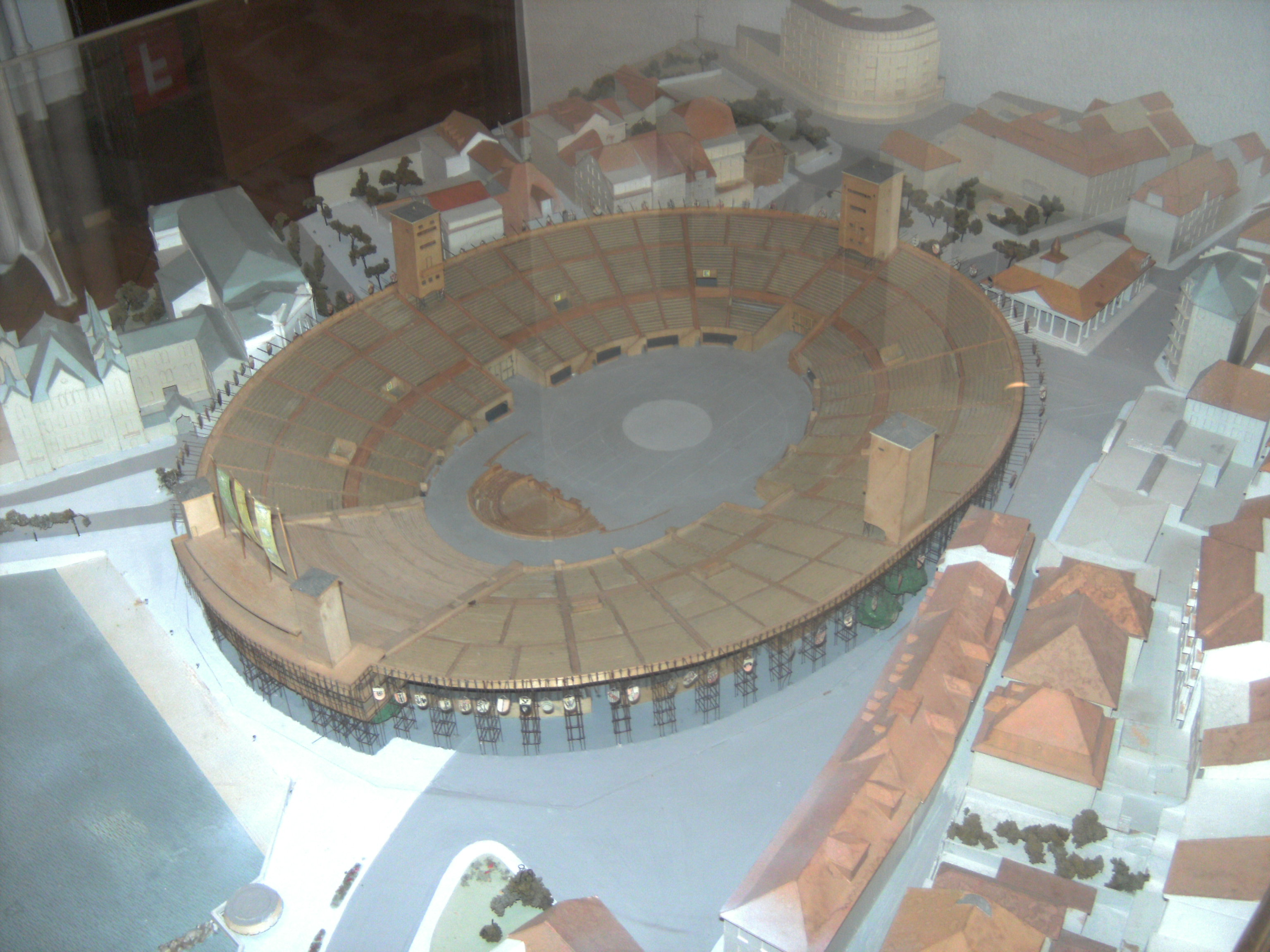
1955

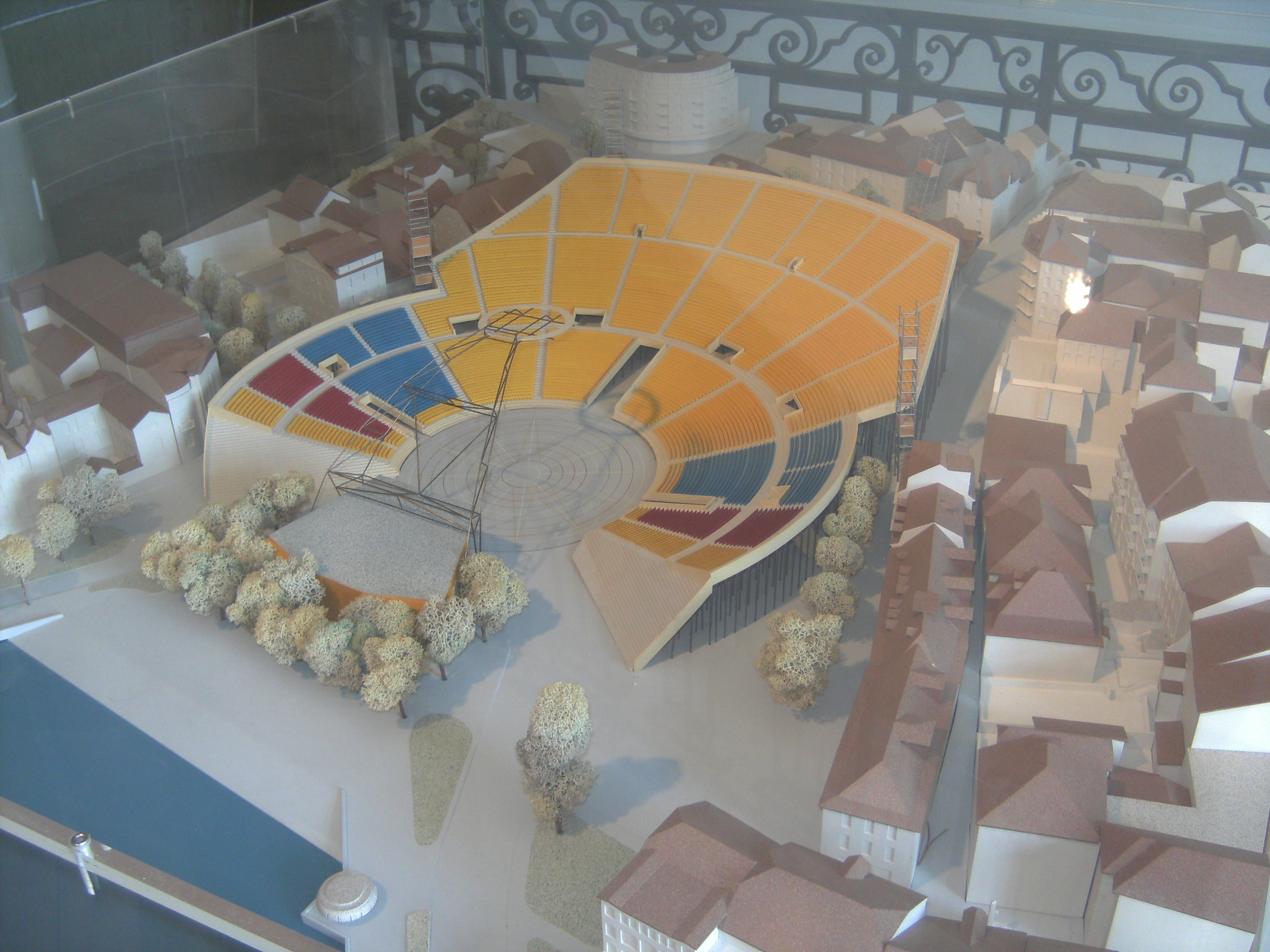
1977

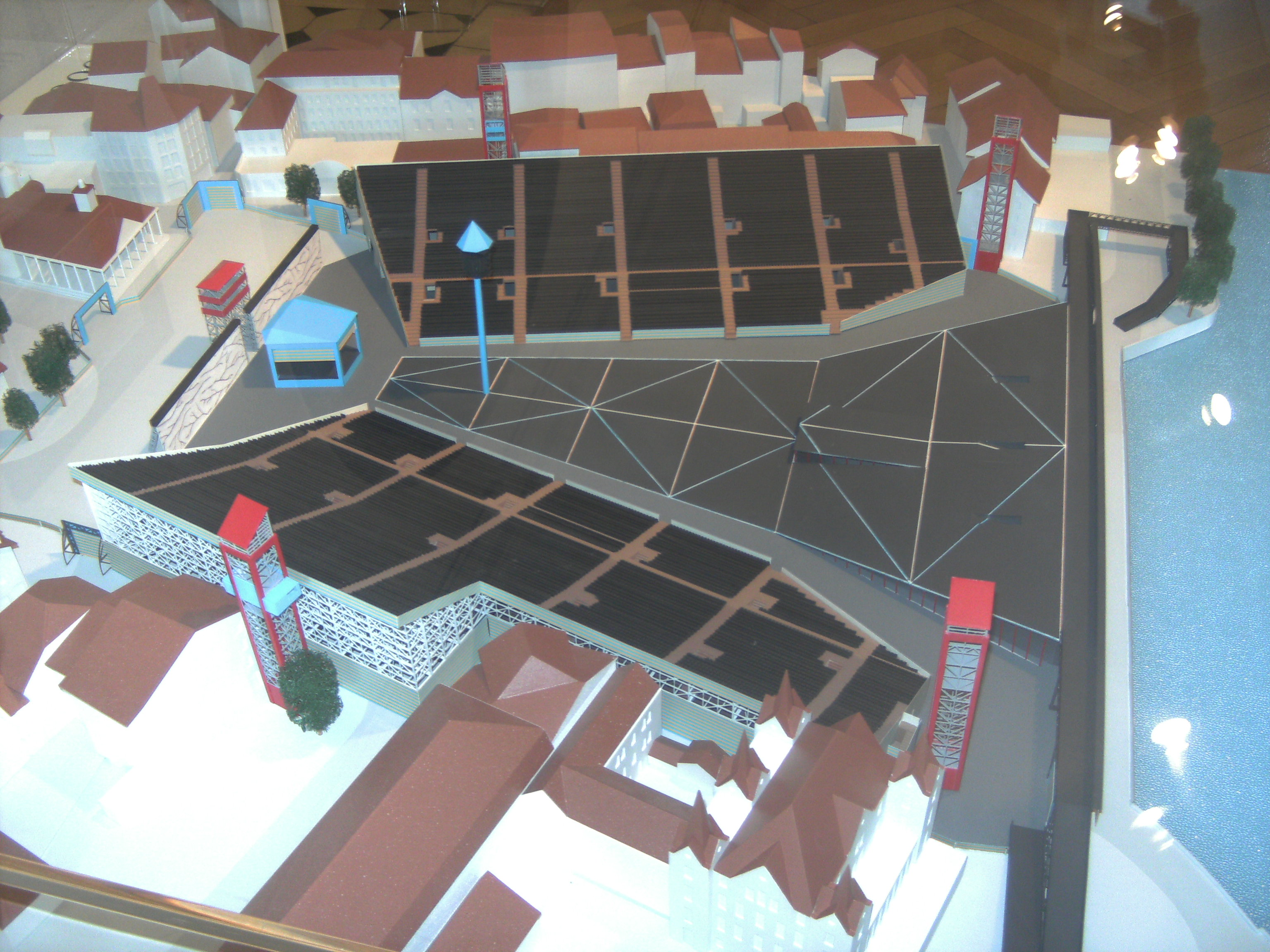
1999

=== 21st century ===
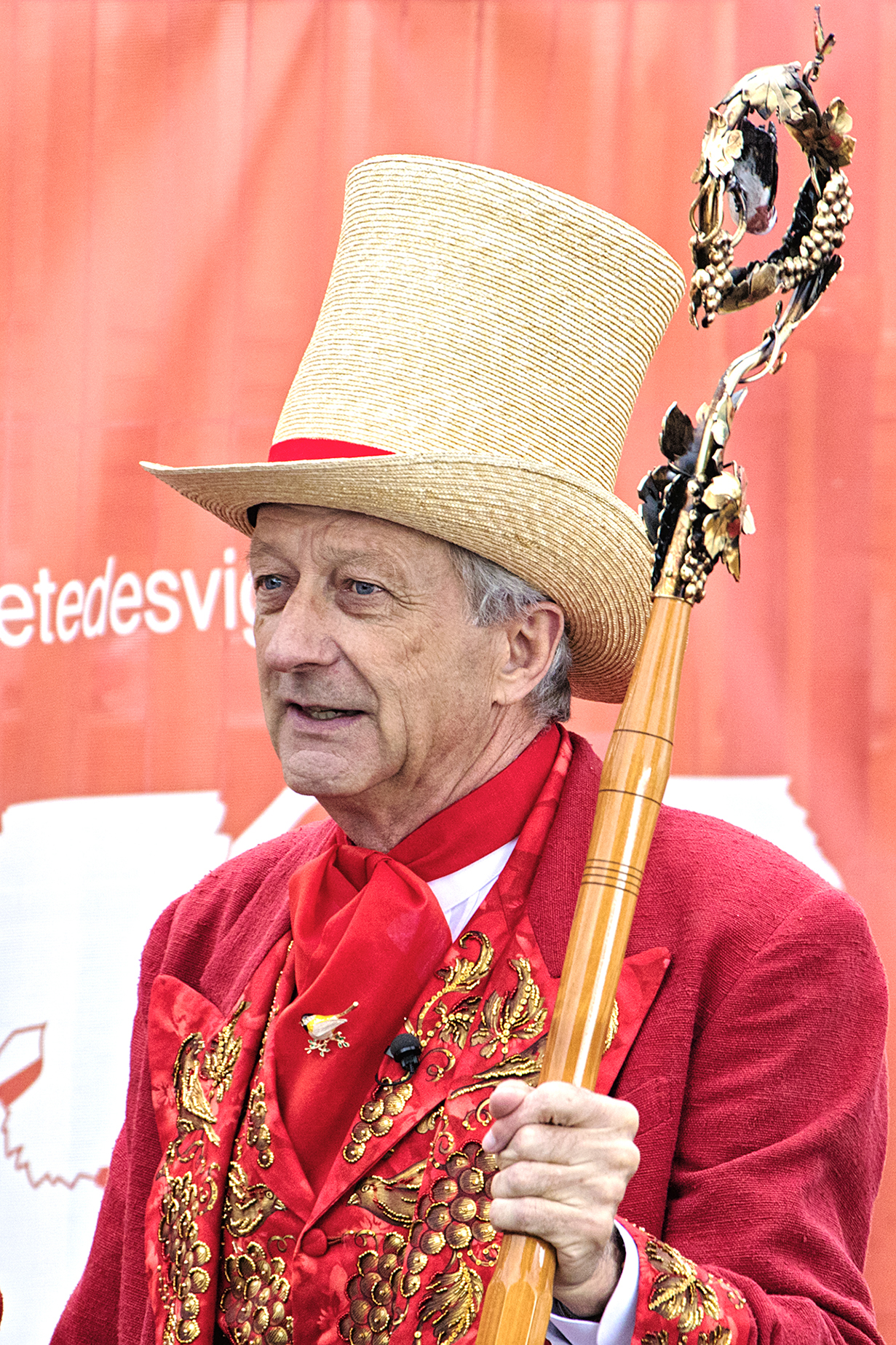
The Abbot-President François Margot goes to the proclamation ceremony

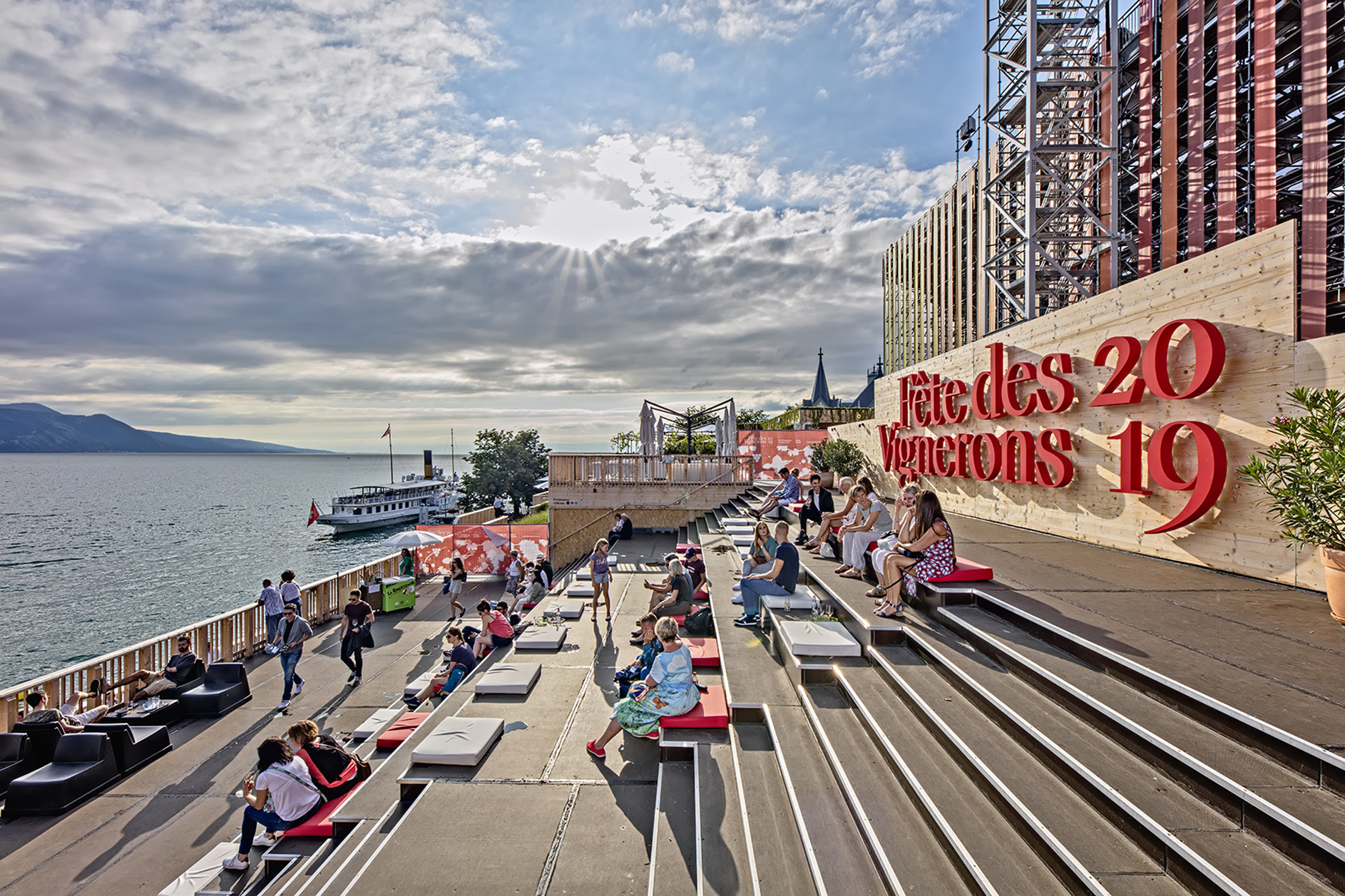
Fête des Vignerons 2019 Vevey, UNESCO Intangible cultural heritage

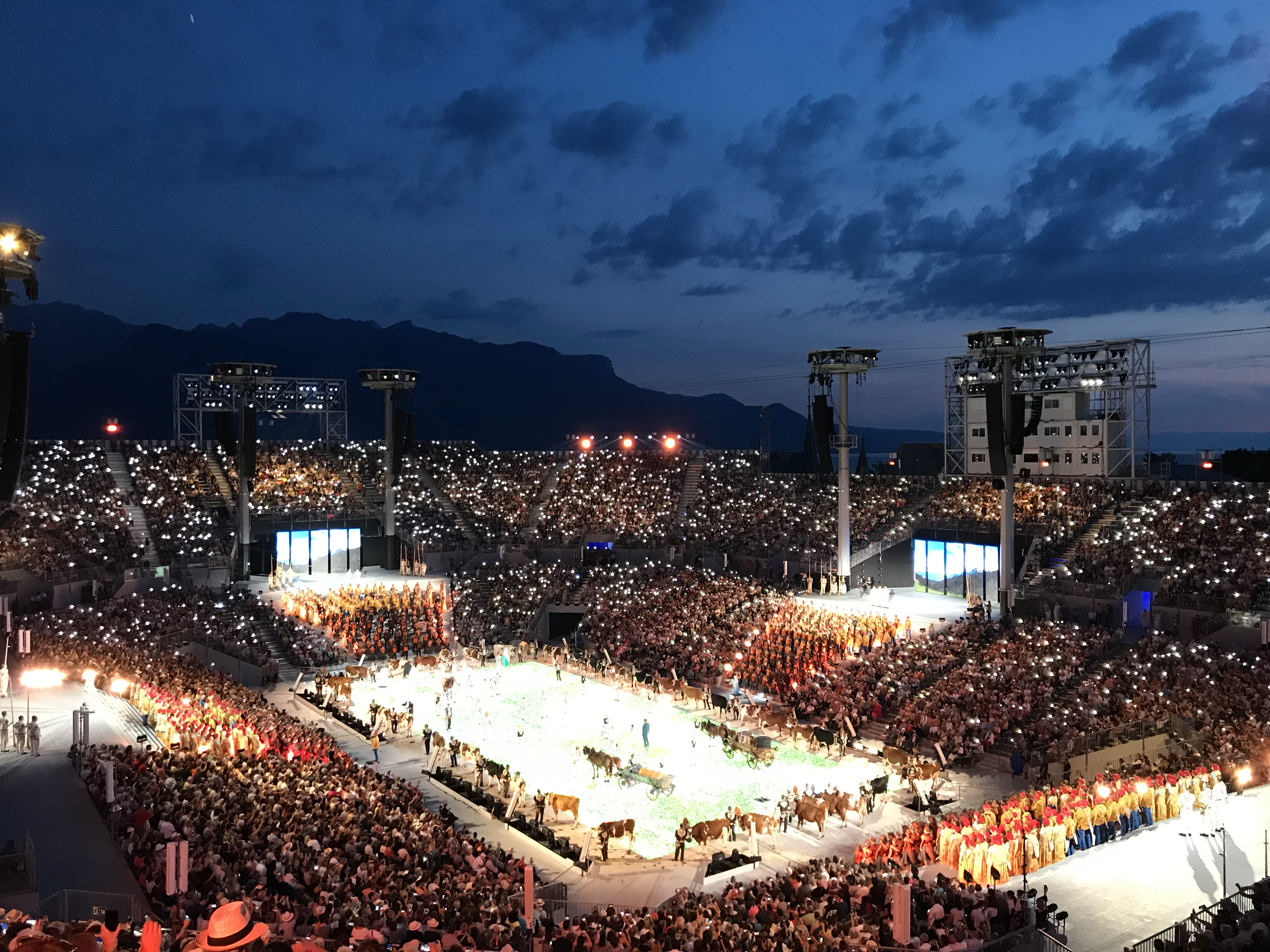
Fête des Vignerons 2019

On 1 December 2016 the Fête des Vignerons was added to UNESCO's Representative List of the intangible cultural heritage of Humanity. It is the first Swiss tradition to be included.

The twelfth Fête des Vignerons was held from 18 July to 11 August 2019. It was presided over by Abbot-President François Margot and was directed by Daniele Finzi Pasca. The music was composed by Maria Bonzanigo (musical director), Jérôme Berney and Valentin Villard, while the libretto was the work of Stéphane Blok and Blaise Hofmann. The scenography was by Hugo Gargiulo, Bryn Walters was the choreographer and the costumes were designed by Giovanna Buzzi. Among the approximately 6,000 actors and performers, there were nearly 1,000 singers (local choirs, choir-percussionists, children) conducted by Caroline Meyer and Céline Grandjean in an arena of 20,000 seats. "Ranz des vaches" was performed by eleven armaillis (traditional cow-herdsmen), rather than a soloist as had been done since 1889.

The 2019 spectacle traced the activities of winegrowers through the seasons, seen through the eyes and imagination of a small girl called "petite Julie". The opening scene is set during the grape harvest. Julie's grandfather is playing cards and drinking wine outside a winegrowers' hut (locally known as a "capite"). During the spectacle, Julie's grandfather teaches her about the mysteries of grapevines, the beauty of the landscape and the culture of wine-making. She repeatedly encounters the Three Doctors, clownish local worthies and experts of the Fête. Reality is transformed into a dreamlike fairy world through Julie's imagination and she is accompanied on her adventures by a beautiful dragonfly.

== See also ==
- The Headsman: The Abbaye des Vignerons, 1833 novel by James Fenimore Cooper
