= Joseph Hardman =

English merchant and translator (c. 1783 – 1870)

Joseph Hardman (Note: The Wellesley Index to Victorian Periodicals (1966) listed his name as John Hardman, following Margaret Oliphant's William Blackwood and His Sons (1897), but this was corrected in The Curran Index to Nineteenth-Century Periodicals, and all primary sources give his name as Joseph.) (c. 1783 – 3 March 1870) was an English merchant and contributor to Blackwood's Magazine.

== Life ==
Hardman was born in Manchester, and was baptised in St Ann's Church on 23 July 1783. He became a merchant based in London, married Frances Anna Rougemont, and together they had a son Frederick Hardman (1814–1874).

While living in Highgate, Hardman became the neighbour and friend of Samuel Taylor Coleridge. In March 1828, Coleridge wrote to him about a new magazine that they had been planning, which eventually became the short-lived London Review (1829) under editor Joseph Blanco White.

He completed a number of translations for Blackwood's Magazine; they were, in his own words, "drawn chiefly from German and Danish sources and consisted of romantic and piquant tales, freely altered from the originals and adapted to British taste and feeling." These included "The Robber's Tower", based on Heinrich Clauren's "Das Raubschloß", which may have been a source of inspiration for Edgar Allan Poe's "The Fall of the House of Usher" (1840), and "The Headsman", based on Lauritz Kruse's "Das Verhängnis", which might have been read by James Fenimore Cooper before writing his novel The Headsman: The Abbaye des Vignerons (1833). Hardman wrote to the editor to submit his work under the pseudonym "Amicus of Paris", though his works were generally published in Blackwood's Magazine without attribution. He also used this name in correspondence with other magazines, such as in letters written to The New Sporting Magazine in 1833.

Hardman died on 3 March 1870 while living at Tudor Place, Richmond Green, and was buried at St Mary's Church, Twickenham.

== Works ==
=== As translator ===
- "The Sphinx; An Extravaganza, Etched in the Manner of Callot" in Blackwood's Magazine (October 1828)
- "The Duellists; A Tale of the Thirty Years War" in Blackwood's Magazine (November 1828)
- "The Robber’s Tower; A True Adventure" in Blackwood's Magazine (December 1828) based on a story by Heinrich Clauren
- "Sketches of Italy and the Italians, with Remarks on Antiquities and Fine Art" in Blackwood's Magazine (January–August 1829)
- "The Modern Gyges; A Tale of Trials" in Blackwood's Magazine (February 1829)
- "Poetical and Devotional Superstitions of Italy" in Blackwood's Magazine (July 1829)
- "Colonna the Painter; A Tale of Italy and the Arts" in Blackwood's Magazine (September 1829)
- "Phenomena of the Great Earthquake in 1783 in Calabria and Sicily" in Blackwood's Magazine (December 1829)
- "The Headsman; A Tale of Doom" in Blackwood's Magazine (February 1830) based on a story by Lauritz Kruse
- "The Pirates of Segna; A Tale of Venice and the Adriatic" translated with Frederick Hardman in Blackwood's Magazine (March–April 1844)

=== As editor ===
- "The Venta of Armentia; A Sketch of the Late Carlist War in Spain" translated by Frederick Hardman in Blackwood's Magazine (January 1841)
- "A Convent of Franciscans" translated by Frederick Hardman in Blackwood's Magazine (September 1841)
- "A Passage in the Life of a Maître-d'Armes" translated by Frederick Hardman in Blackwood's Magazine (November 1842 – June 1843)
