= The Headsman: The Abbaye des Vignerons =

1833 novel by James Fenimore Cooper

The Headsman: The Abbaye des Vignerons is an 1833 novel by James Fenimore Cooper set in Switzerland. The novel was inspired by one of Cooper's trips during his European travels in 1832. The novel is one of three of Cooper's "European" novels, following The Bravo and The Heidenmauer, all of which use the European setting to deal with socio-political contrast with American institutions.

== Development ==
During his time living in Europe, Cooper visited Switzerland in 1832. While there, he wrote in his journal "I have determined now I am here to commence a Swiss tale". Cooper's eldest daughter suggested that he had read up on the history of Vevey, including the organisation known as the Abbaye des Vignerons which organised the Fête des Vignerons, though it seems he did not observe this festival himself. He may also have been inspired by "The Headsman; A Tale of Doom", an adaptation by Joseph Hardman of Lauritz Kruse's "Das Verhängnis" that had been published in Blackwood's Magazine (February 1830), and also "Hereditary Honours", a humorous sketch in the New Monthly Magazine (1832).

== Themes ==
The novel explores a number of themes related to how society structures itself, including justice, authority, friendship, parental relationships, love and marriage.

== Critical reception ==
The novel is typically described for its socio-political commentary, but critics have argued the importance of treating the novel as part of Cooper's deliberate artistry. Constance Ayers Denne describes this artistry as largely reflected in the novel's powerful structure and successful thematic treatment. Many critics who have read the novel for socio-political themes, were unsatisfied with its ending. Critic Thomas Palfrey argues that the novel has structural and thematic similarities to Balzac's works, such as Jesus Christ in Flanders.
