= The Bravo =

Novel by James Fenimore Cooper

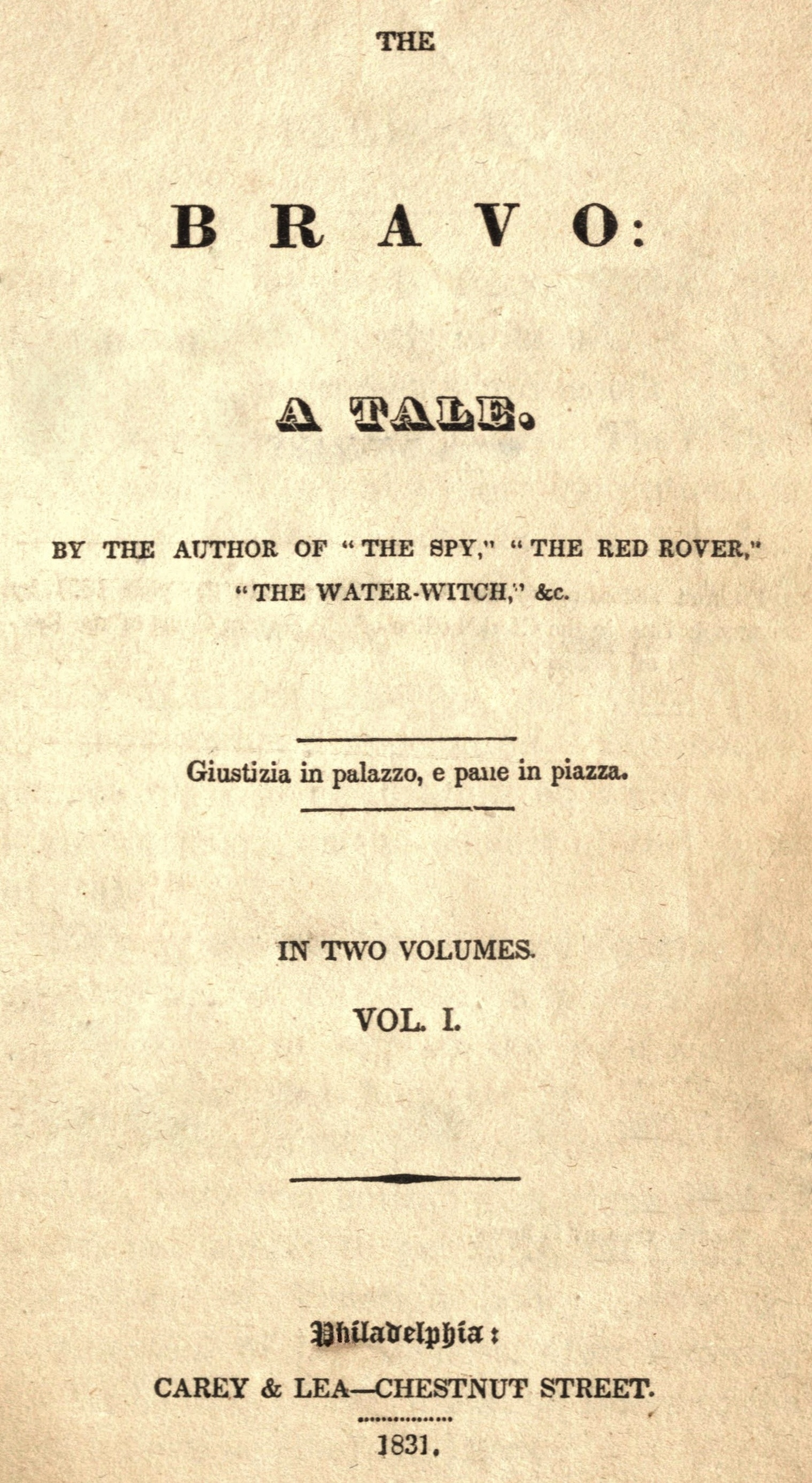
- First edition title page
- Author: James Fenimore Cooper
- Language: English
- Genre: Novel
- Publisher: Carey & Lea
- Publication date: 1831
- Publication place: United States

The Bravo is a novel by James Fenimore Cooper first published in 1831 in two volumes. Inspired by a trip to Europe where he traveled through much of Italy, the novel is set in Venice. The Bravo is the first of Cooper's three novels to be set in Europe. This group of three novels, which one critic would call Cooper's "European trilogy", include The Heidenmauer and The Headsman. Like his other novels set in Europe, The Bravo was not very well received in the United States. The book largely focuses on political themes, especially the tension between the social elite and other classes.

== Background ==
In 1829–1830, Cooper toured Italy with his wife and family. Starting in Florence, where he spent considerable time absorbing the Tuscan culture, Cooper departed on a sailing trip around Italy, visiting many historic cities including Genoa, Marseille and much of Southern Italy. In Sorrento, Cooper finished The Water-Witch, after which, he again departed, sailing again through the Adriatic. Upon reaching Venice, Cooper was so struck by the architecture that he was inspired to write the novel that would become The Bravo.

== Style ==
In The Bravo, Cooper uses lightness and darkness to paint the scenes. However, unlike some of his other books, The Bravo is predominated by dark settings and language. Following his political themes, the official political powers in the novel are often draped in dark settings. In this context, the few chapters which present Venice as brightly lit, depict daylight as a hypocritical false front. However, Moonlight, unlike sunlight and artificial lighting, illuminates scenes of hope to overcome the dark "official Venice".

== Themes ==
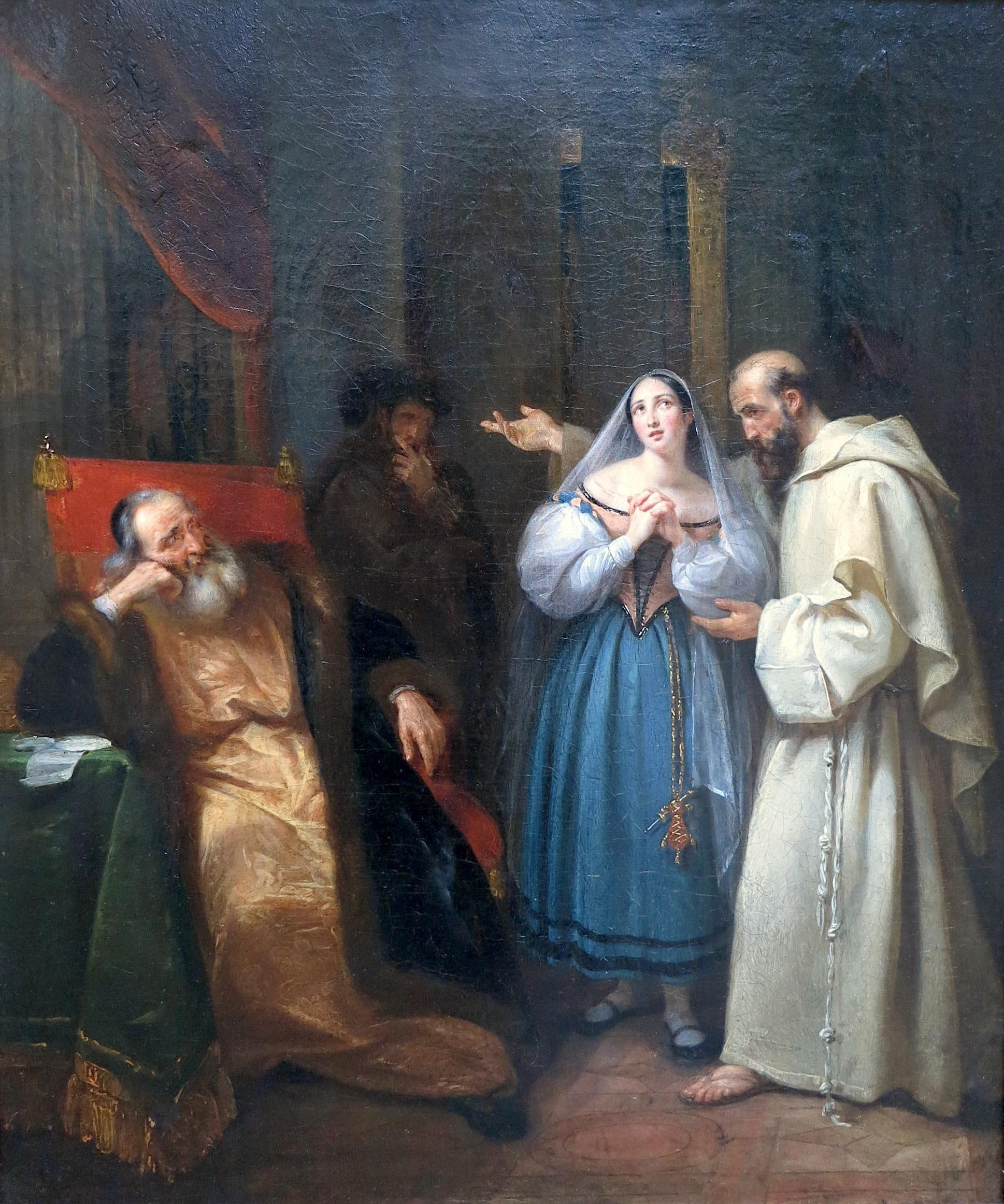
Aimée Brune-Pagès, The Bravo, 1832

The Bravo deals with many political themes. Cooper would later explain that he wrote the novel because " the great political contest of the age was not, as is usually pretended, between the two antagonist principles of monarchy and democracy, but in reality between those who, under the shallow pretense of limiting power to the elite of society, were contending for exclusive advantages at the expense of the mass of their fellow-creature." He saw under Europe's old order and lush surface, "an oppressive social order without any sense of divine law in nature" which sat in antithesis to America's unexplored wilderness and less structured society. To Cooper, Venice's government is unable to meet the demands of its citizens, even representing its aristocrats as victims.

== Adaptations ==
The novel was adapted into a play, La Vénétienne, by Auguste Anicet-Bourgeois; this in turn served as the basis for an opera, Il bravo, by Saverio Mercadante, which premiered in 1839 at La Scala.
