= Biel Solothurn Symphony Orchestra =

Swiss symphony orchestra

The Biel Solothurn Symphony Orchestra (Sinfonie Orchester Biel Solothurn / Orchestre Symphonique Bienne Soleure) was founded in 1969 and has since gained an important place within the Swiss music scene. It is based in the Swiss cities of Biel-Bienne and Solothurn. Heavily influenced by Swiss conductors Armin Jordan and Jost Meier in its beginnings, the orchestra has been directed by Kaspar Zehnder since the 2012/2013 season.

== Biography ==
Central to the ensemble's artistic work are the symphonic concerts in Biel and Solothurn. While never neglecting the important works of the classical repertory, a special emphasis is placed on works from the 20st century and contemporary music: Orchestral compositions by Edward Rushton, Urs Peter Schneider, Cécile Marti, Daniel Andres, Jean-Luc Darbellay and Hanns Eisler have seen their first performance by this orchestra. The Biel Solothurn Symphony Orchestra has also premiered new operas by Christian Henking, Jost Meier, Martin Derungs, Martin Markun, or Benjamin Schweitzer.

Next to the symphonic concerts and its participation in the operatic productions of the Theater Orchester Biel Solothurn, the orchestra presents annual summer concerts which take place under the open sky and feature young musicians in training from all over the country.

The recognition towards the Biel Solothurn Symphony Orchestra is reflected in the impressive list of its collaborators: Internationally renowned conductors such as Lawrence Foster, Matthias Bamert, Nathalie Stutzmann, Augustin Dumay, José van Dam, Arabella Steinbacher, Heinz Holliger, Milan Horvat, Maxim Vengerov, Marcello Viotti, Gábor Takács-Nagy, Natalia Gutmann, Louis Lortie, Patricia Kopatchinskaja, Misha Maisky, Feng Ning, Renaud and Gautier Capuçon and Giovanni Bellucci stand for the artistic qualities of the orchestra.

Austria's «Carinthian Summer Music Festival» and «Feldkirch Festival», the «Martinů Festtage» in Basel, the «Musikfestival Bern», «Murten Classics» Festival, «Festival International de musique» in Besançon, the Brussels Music Chapel Festival and many more have invited the Biel Solothurn Symphony Orchestra as guest performers.

Various recordings have been favourably reviewed nationally and internationally. In 2015, the Biel Solothurn Symphony Orchestra started a new series of recordings of works by lesser known romantic composers such as Robert Radecke, Ferdinand Thierot, Josef Rheinberger and Robert Volkmann with the labels CPO and Outhere Music.

== First performances (selection) ==
Orchestral works:

- Jean-Luc Darbellay: Concerts for bass clarinet, flute and horn / "Belena", melodrama for voice and orchestra
- Andreas Pflüger: Double concert for bandoneon and harpsichord
- Philippe Fénelon: Concert arias
- Edward Rushton: "The City"
- Urs Peter Schneider: "Achtsamkeit" / "Amen"
- Hermann Meier: Kleine Elegie / Fünftes Orchesterstück
- Jost Meier: Suite Concertante / "Bieler Stadtratssitzung" / "Adullam" / Concerto for cello and orchestra
- Stefans Grové: "Figures in the mist"
- Daniel Andres: Concert for cello and orchestra / Violin concert / Sonata for 18 strings / "…alors la nuit se change en lumière" / Sinfonietta / Orchesterstücke 1, 2, 3 / Piano concert
- John Glenesk Mortimer: "The Ancient Mariner"
- Hanns Eisler: music from the film Grapes of Wrath

Operas:

- Daniel Andres: "Die Nachtigall der Tausend Geschichten"
- Jost Meier: "Pilger und Fuchs" / "Marie und Robert"
- Martin Derungs and Martin Markun: "Anna Göldi"
- Benjamin Schweitzer: "Jakob von Gunten"
- Christian Henking: "Figaro¿"
