= Heinrich Clauren =

German writer (1771–1854)

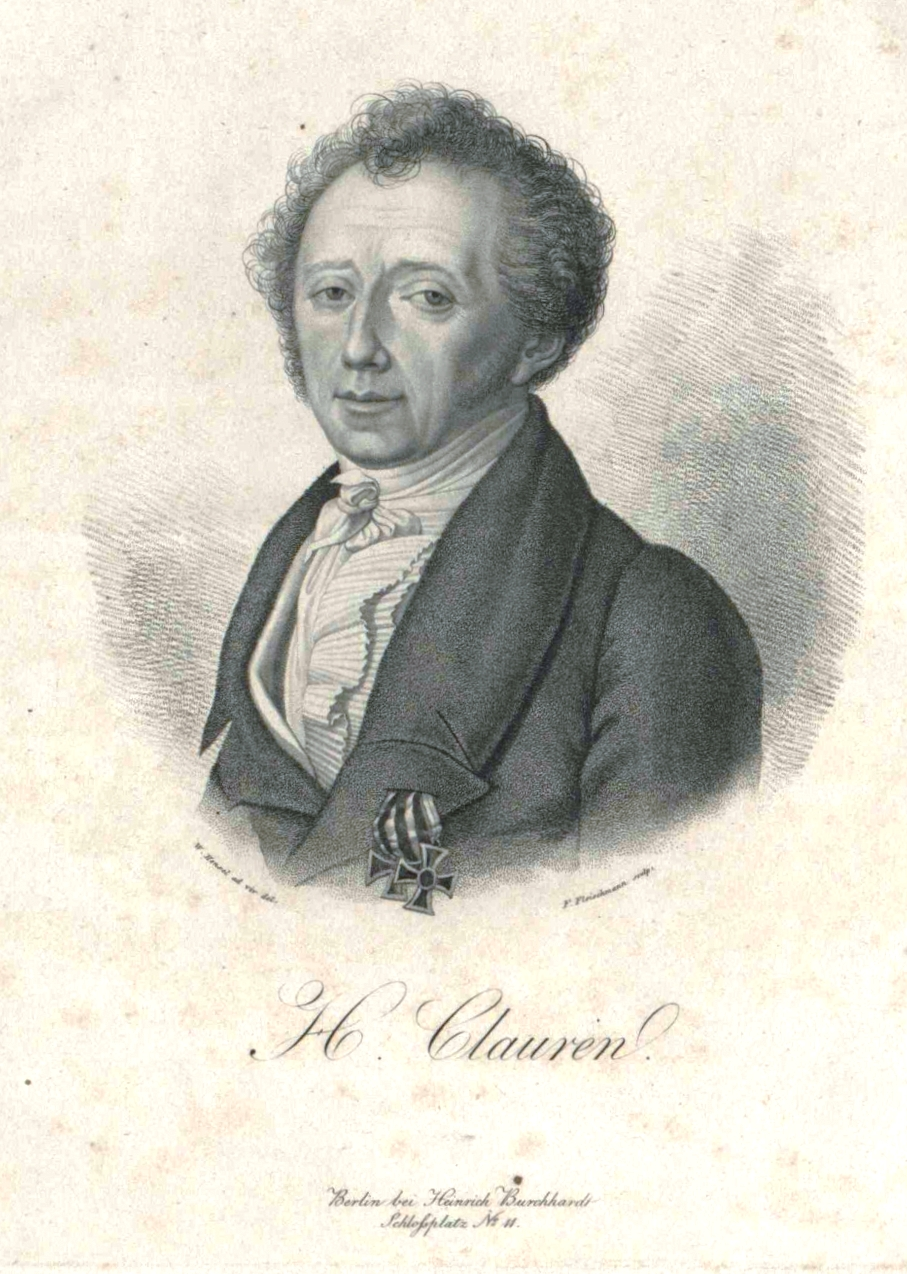
- Lithograph
- Born: Carl Gottlieb Samuel Heun; 20 March 1771; Doberlug-Kirchhain, Lusatia
- Died: 2 August 1854 (aged 83); Berlin
- Occupation: Author
- Writing career
- Pen name: Heinrich Clauren
- Language: German

Carl Gottlieb Samuel Heun (20 March 1771 – 2 August 1854), better known by his pen name Heinrich Clauren, was a German author.

== Biography ==
Born on 20 March 1771 in Doberlug, Lower Lusatia. Heun went into the Prussian civil service, and wrote in his spare time. He published under the pseudonym H. Clauren (an anagram of Carl Heun), and became one of the most popular authors of fiction for the middle class in the first half of the nineteenth century.

In 1825, Wilhelm Hauff published a parody of Heun's novels, Der Mann im Monde ('The Man in the Moon'), imitating his style, and published under his pen name H. Clauren. Heun brought a lawsuit against Hauff, and won, leading Hauff to write another book, Kontroverspredigt über H. Clauren und den Mann im Mond (1826), successfully destroying the reputation of Heun's works. The following year Carl Herloßsohn also parodied Clauren by publishing a novel in Clauren's name, Emmy oder der Mensch denkt, Gott lenkt (1827) and mocked Clauren's plays in his Der Luftballon oder die Hundstage in Schilda (1827).

Heun's collected works were published in 25 volumes as Gesammelte Schriften in 1851. He died on 2 August 1854 in Berlin.

== Influence ==
One of Heun's short stories, "Die graue Stube", was translated for the French ghost story anthology Fantasmagoriana (1812). Fantasmagoriana was read by Lord Byron, Mary Shelley, Percy Bysshe Shelley, John William Polidori and Claire Clairmont at the Villa Diodati in Cologny, Switzerland during 1816, the Year Without a Summer, and inspired them to write their own ghost stories, including "The Vampyre" (1819), and Frankenstein (1818), both of which went on to shape the Gothic horror genre. A. J. Day describes how many themes and ideas in Frankenstein are a reflection of Fantasmagoriana, and uses passages from Heun's "Die graue Stube" to compare to both the novel and Shelley's recollection of her inspiration in the preface to the novel.

Another of his short stories, "Das Raubschloß", may have been one of the sources of inspiration for Edgar Allan Poe's "The Fall of the House of Usher" (1839), as translated by Joseph Hardman as "The Robber's Tower" in Blackwood's Magazine.

In Thomas Mann's Buddenbrooks (1901), the young Miss Antonie Buddenbrook is found reading Clauren's novel Mimili.

== Translations ==
A number of Clauren's works have been translated into English:

- "Nordische Liebe" and "Die Launen der Liebe" were translated by John Kortz as "Northern Love" and "The Humours of Love" in Interesting Memoirs of Four German Gentlemen (1819)
- "Der Wehrmann" was translated anonymously as "The Apparition" in The Repository of Arts (1821)
- "Der Grünmantel von Venedig" was translated anonymously as "The Green Mantle of Venice: A True Story" in The Repository of Arts (1821–1822)
- "Liesli oder der Kirchhof zu Schwyz" was translated by Frederic Shoberl as "The Church-Yard of Schwytz" in Forget Me Not for 1823, and again by James David Haas as Liesli: A Swiss Tale (1826)
- "Mimili" was translated anonymously in Forget Me Not for 1824
- "Der selige Papiermüller" was translated anonymously as "The Paper-Maker's Coffin" in The Edinburgh Literary Journal (1828)
- "Das Raubschloß" was freely translated by Joseph Hardman as "The Robber's Tower" in Blackwood's Magazine (1828), and more accurately by Dan Latimer as "The Robber's Castle" in Southern Humanities Review 24 (1990)
- "Die Großmutter" was translated by George Godfrey Cunningham as "My Grandmother" in Foreign Tales and Traditions (1829)
- The first part of "Die graue Stube" was translated by Marjorie Bowen as "The Grey Chamber" in Great Tales of Horror (1933), and again by Leonard Wolf as "The Gray Room: A True Story" in The Essential Frankenstein (1993); both parts of the story were translated by A. J. Day as "The Grey Room" in Fantasmagoriana: Tales of the Dead (2005), and again by Anna Ziegelhof as "The Grey Chamber: A True Story" in Fantasmagoriana Deluxe (2023)
- "Lied der Preussen" was translated by Pamela Selwyn as "Song of the Prussians" in Revisiting Prussia's Wars against Napoleon (2015)

== See also ==
- Christian Köhler, an artist, originally Heun's stableboy
