= Jost Meier =

Swiss composer and orchestra conductor (1939–2022)

- Born: 15 March 1939; Solothurn, Switzerland
- Died: 5 December 2022 (aged 83); Basel, Switzerland
- Occupations: Composer; Orchestra conductor

Jost Meier (15 March 1939 – 5 December 2022) was a Swiss composer and orchestra conductor.

== Biography ==
After he completed his studies in Solothurn, Meier studied cello at the Conservatory of Biel under Rolf Looser and earned a diploma in teaching. He then played for multiple ensembles, including the Tonhalle-Orchester Zürich and the Camerata Bern.

Meier served as conductor of the Biel Solothurn Symphony Orchestra from 1969 to 1979 (or from 1968 to 1980 according to other sources). In 1980, he became conductor of the Theater Basel.

Meier composed several operas, including Sennentuntschi, Der Drache, and Der Zoobär. He was one of three composers at the Fête des Vignerons in Vevey in 1999 alongside Jean-François Bovard and Michel Hostettler. In 2018, his works became available at the library of the City of Basel Music Academy.

Jost Meier died in Basel on 5 December 2022, at the age of 83.
