= Henri Blowitz =

Bohemian journalist (1825–1903)

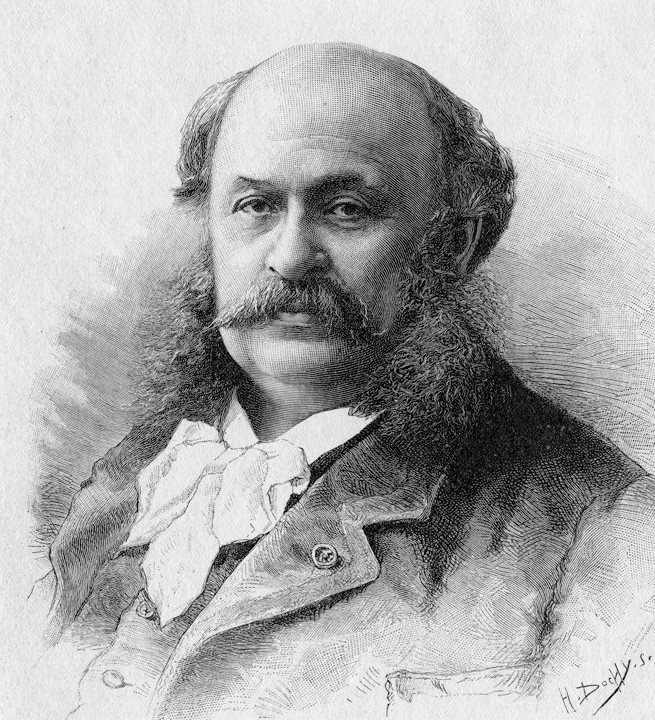
- Born: Heinrich Opper; 28 December 1825; Blovice, Bohemia
- Died: 18 January 1903 (aged 77)
- Occupation: Journalist

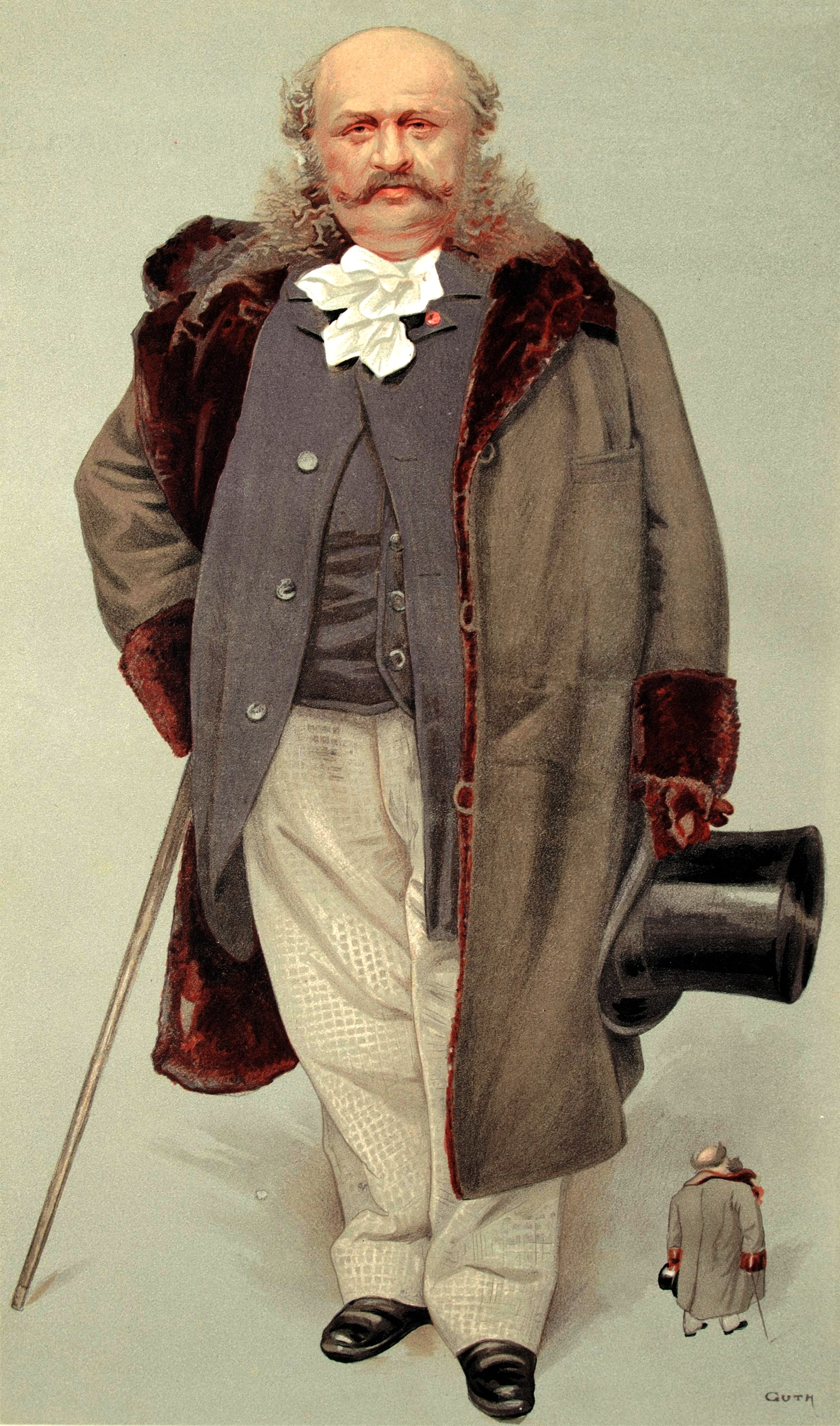
Blowitz by 'Guth' (Jean Baptiste Guth) in Vanity Fair magazine dated 7 December 1889

Henri Georges Stephane Adolphe Opper de Blowitz (28 December 1825 – 18 January 1903), previously Heinrich Opper and also known as Heinrich Opper von Blowitz, was a Bohemian journalist.

== Biography ==
Blowitz began life as Heinrich Georg Stephan Adolf Opper, called Jindřich in the Czech spelling, in a family of Jewish ancestry at Blowitz (now Blovice) in Bohemia, and left home at the age of fifteen to travel, acquiring a wide range of languages in the process. When financial constraints led him to plan emigration to America, he by chance met M. de Falloux, the French minister responsible for public education, and was appointed as a teacher of foreign languages at the Tours Lycée in around 1849. He thereafter transferred to the Marseilles Lycée. He resigned his job there in 1859 when he got married, in order to devote himself to literature and politics.

When, in 1869, Ferdinand de Lesseps ran for election as deputy from Marseilles, Blowitz became involved in a scandal due to supplying information to a Legitimist newspaper. This led to calls for his expulsion from France, which he countered by retiring to the country. The next year, the calls began again, as he began to predict the collapse of the Empire during the Franco-Prussian War; this time, he evaded them by naturalising as a French subject whilst the Battle of Sedan was being fought. Three days after the battle, a Republic was proclaimed.

Once naturalised, Blowitz returned to Marseilles, where he worked for Adolphe Thiers. He later worked gathering information for him at Versailles, and as a result Thiers offered him the French consulship at Riga. Shortly before he was to accept this, Blowitz became the assistant to Laurence Oliphant, the Paris correspondent of The Times, whilst the second correspondent was absent. When the second correspondent, Frederick Hardman, succeeded Oliphant, Blowitz remained as assistant, and when Hardman died in 1873 he himself became chief Paris correspondent.

In this role Blowitz became famous, both as a journalist and for his insights into diplomacy. In 1875, the duc de Decazes, the Minister of Foreign Affairs, informed him of a confidential despatch from the French ambassador to Berlin, discussing German plans to attack France, and requested Blowitz publish an exposé; he did so, provoking a storm of public opinion, and effectively preventing any chance of the German intention being carried out. In 1877 and 1888 he successfully exposed internal conspiracies against the Republic.

Blowitz's most famous achievement was in 1878, when he managed to obtain the text of the Treaty of Berlin and publish it at the very moment that the Congress of Berlin was finally signing it. The same year he was made an Officier of the Légion d'honneur.

Blowitz finally retired from his work for The Times in 1902, to be replaced by the newspaper's Vienna correspondent, William Lavino. He died a few months later, in January 1903.

== In fiction ==
Blowitz appears as a character in the novella "The Road to Charing Cross" in Flashman and the Tiger (1999) by George MacDonald Fraser. He is also referenced in Robert Harris’s An Officer And A Spy as “the most famous foreign correspondent in the world”. He was one of the members of the press who attended the criminal court of the Seine where Georges Picquart was facing charges relating to the Dreyfus affair.

He appears as a character in the video game 80 Days.
