= The Heidenmauer =

Novel by James Fenimore Cooper

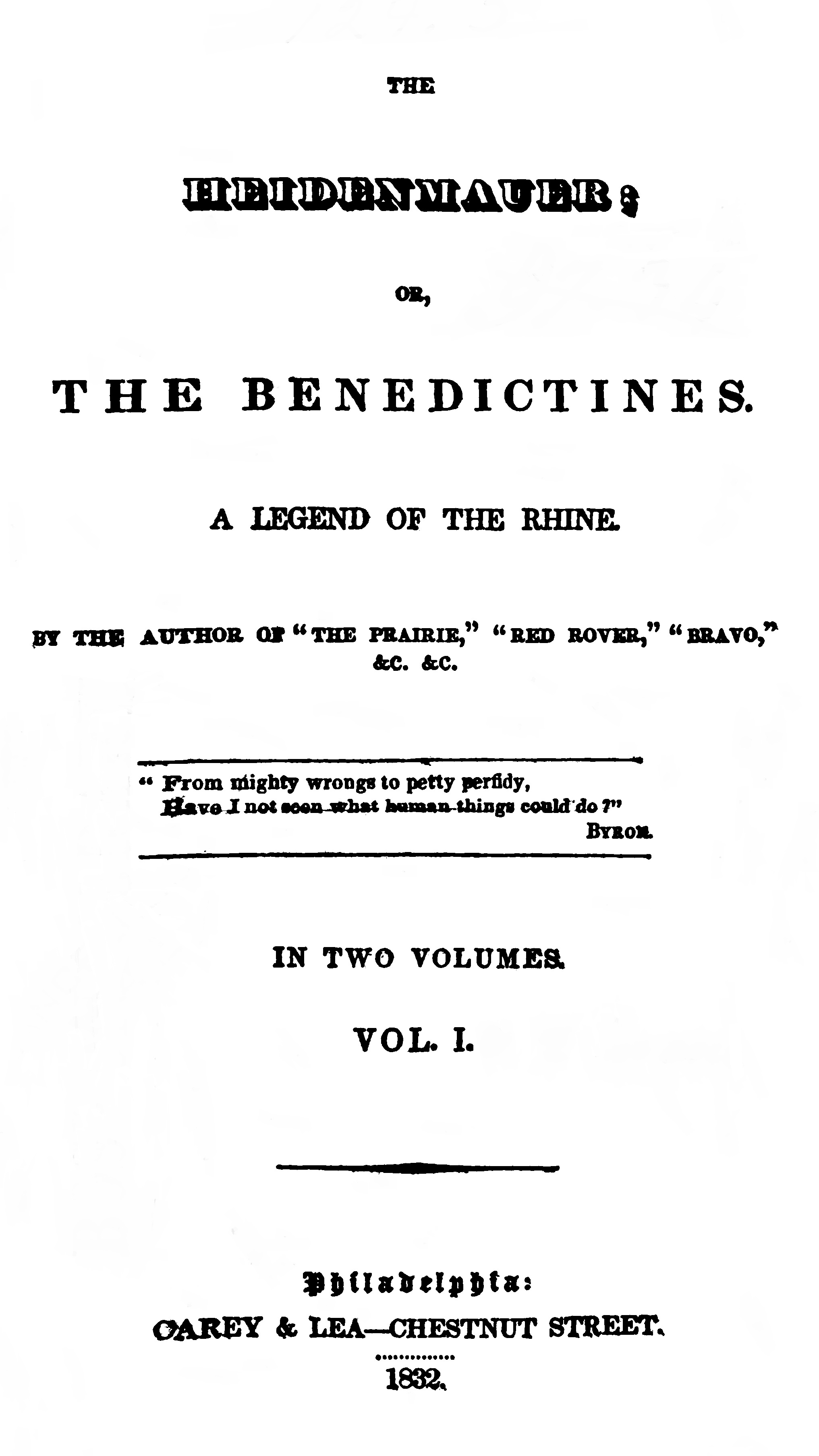
- First edition title page
- Author: James Fenimore Cooper
- Language: English
- Genre: Novel
- Publication date: 1832
- Publication place: United States

The Heidenmauer; or, The Benedictines – A Story of the Rhine is a novel by James Fenimore Cooper, first published in 1832. The novel is a socio-political novel set in 16th-century Germany that focuses on the competition between various socio-political classes and the tension caused by the Reformation. The Heidenmauer is Cooper's second novel in what one critic would call his European Trilogy, following The Bravo and preceding The Headsman. Like the other novels set in Europe, The Heidenmauer is intent on showing the darker side of European institutions in favor of an American perspective.

== Themes and style ==
Central to the themes of the book is internal class struggle for power within the early modern society in Germany. Each of the classes, including the Church, the Aristocracy and the rising bourgeoisie, have characters which epitomize the individual group and represent this tension. The struggle remains bitter throughout the whole novel, thus leaving all of the characters thoroughly unattractive to the reader.

The aforementioned class struggle is part of a larger attempt by Cooper to inspect European society and compare it to the American ideals, trying to un-romanticize Europe's cultural institutions. In 1832 correspondence, Cooper commented that he did not think it was better than The Bravo but "it is a good book and better than two thirds of Scott's. They may say it is like his if they please; they have said so of every book I have written, even The Pilot! But The Heidenmauer is like, and was intended to be like, in order to show how differently a democrat and an aristocrat saw the same thing." Along with his deliberate presentation of themes and characters that represent the European institutions' problems, the narrator too becomes involved, pointing out the corruption of the society to the reader.
