= Frederick Hardman =

English journalist and novelist

Frederick Hardman (1814–1874) was an English journalist and novelist.

== Life ==
He was the son of Joseph Hardman, a London merchant from Manchester, who knew Samuel Taylor Coleridge and contributed to Blackwood's Magazine. On leaving Whitehead's school at Ramsgate, he entered the counting-house of his maternal uncle Rougemont, a London merchant.

In 1834 Hardman joined the Auxiliary Legion as lieutenant in the second Lancers. Severely wounded in one of the last engagements of the First Carlist War, he passed his convalescence at Toulouse. On returning to England he became a regular contributor to Blackwood.

A critical review of the Salon de Paris which Hardman sent to The Times led to his being taken on about 1850 as a foreign correspondent. He was first at Madrid, and was in Constantinople during the Russo-Turkish War of 1853. In the Crimean War that followed, he wrote about the drunkenness in the British Army after the suspension of hostilities.

Hardman went on to the Danubian Principalities, advised Cavour at Turin, and witnessed the campaigns in the Second Italian War of Independence, Hispano-Moroccan War, and the Second Schleswig War. He was at Tours and Bordeaux in the Franco-Prussian War of 1870-1, and was at Rome in 1871-3.

Succeeding Laurence Oliphant as chief correspondent of The Times in Paris, Hardman died there on 6 November 1874.

== Works ==
Hardman's first article (1840) was an account of an expedition with the guerilla chief Martín Zurbano. It was reprinted with other papers in Peninsular Scenes and Sketches. The Student of Salamanca, a novel, was also reprinted, and Tales from Blackwood contains nine of his shorter stories. In 1849 he edited Thomas Hamilton's Annals of the Peninsular Campaign; in 1852, he published Central America; and in 1854, he translated Charles Weiss's History of the French Protestant Refugees.

== Notes ==
Attribution This article incorporates text from a publication now in the public domain: Stephen, Leslie; Lee, Sidney, eds. (1890). "Hardman, Frederick". Dictionary of National Biography. Vol. 24. London: Smith, Elder & Co.
