= Blovice =

- Town
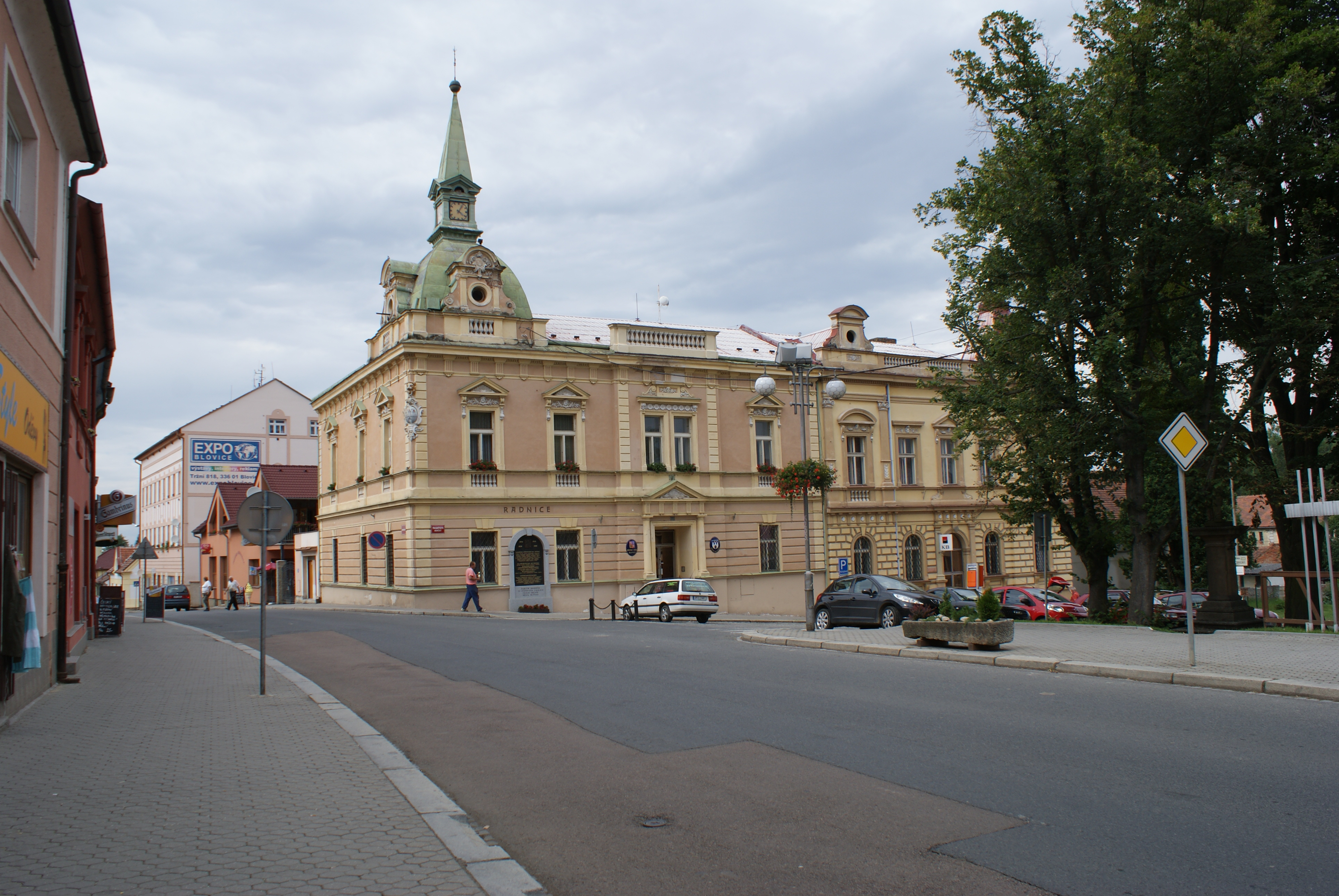
- Town hall

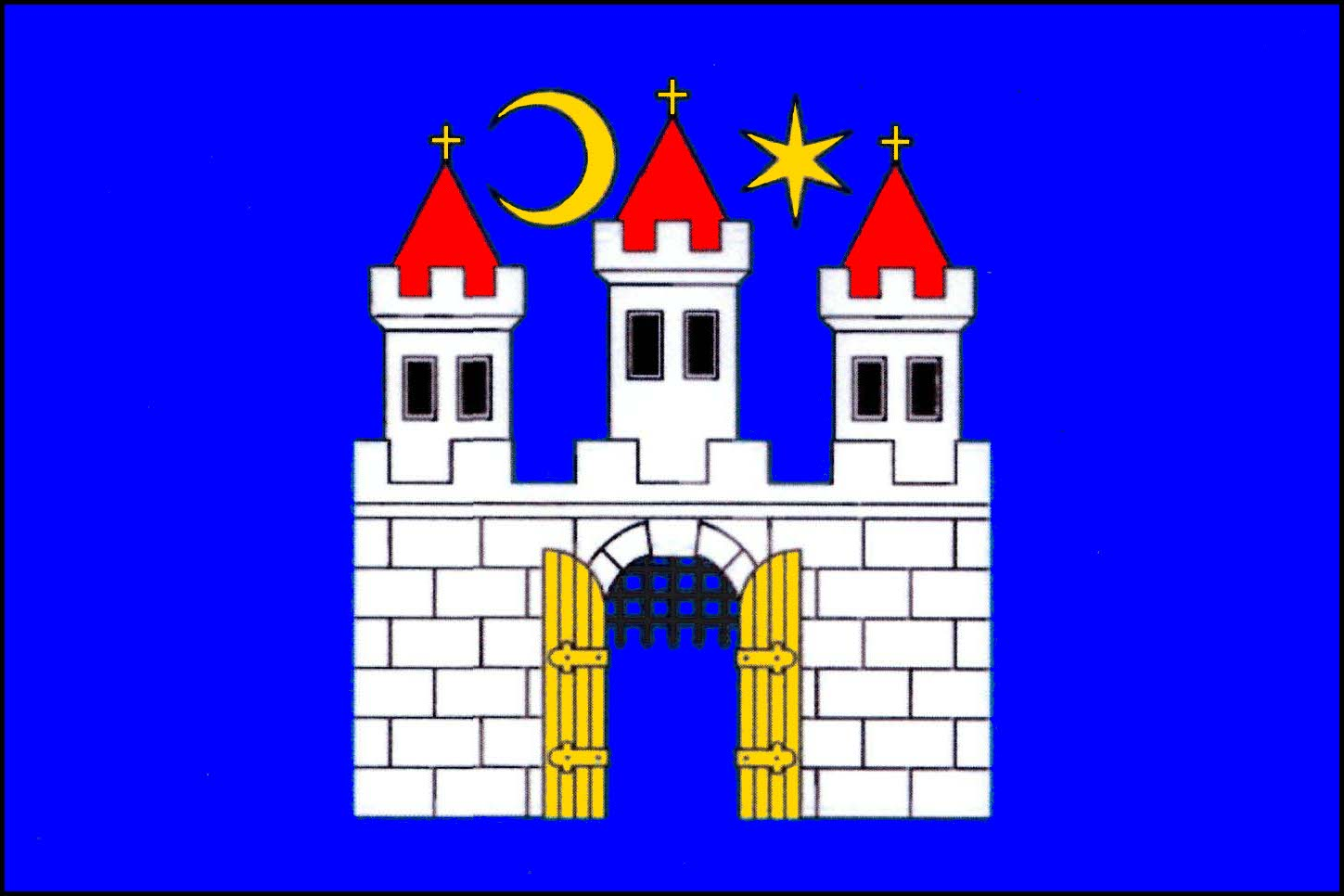
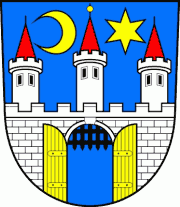
- Flag Coat of arms

- Location in the Czech Republic
- Coordinates: 49°35′7″N 13°32′14″E
- Country: Czech Republic
- Region: Plzeň
- District: Plzeň-South
- First mentioned: 1284

Government
  - Mayor: Robert Zelenka

Area
  - Total: 28.96 km^{2} (11.18 sq mi)
- Elevation: 387 m (1,270 ft)

Population (2026-01-01)
  - Total: 4,258
  - Density: 147.0/km^{2} (380.8/sq mi)
- Time zone: UTC+1 (CET)
  - Summer (DST): UTC+2 (CEST)
- Postal code: 336 01
- Website: www.blovice-mesto.cz

Blovice (Czech pronunciation: [ˈblovɪtsɛ]; German: Blowitz) is a town in Plzeň-South District in the Plzeň Region of the Czech Republic. It has about 4,300 inhabitants. The town is located on the Úslava River in the Švihov Highlands.

== Administrative division ==
Blovice consists of nine municipal parts (in brackets population according to the 2021 census):

- Blovice (3,035)
- Bohušov (41)
- Hradiště (376)
- Hradišťská Lhotka (49)
- Hradišťský Újezd (41)
- Komorno (80)
- Stará Huť (19)
- Štítov (98)
- Vlčice (260)

== Geography ==
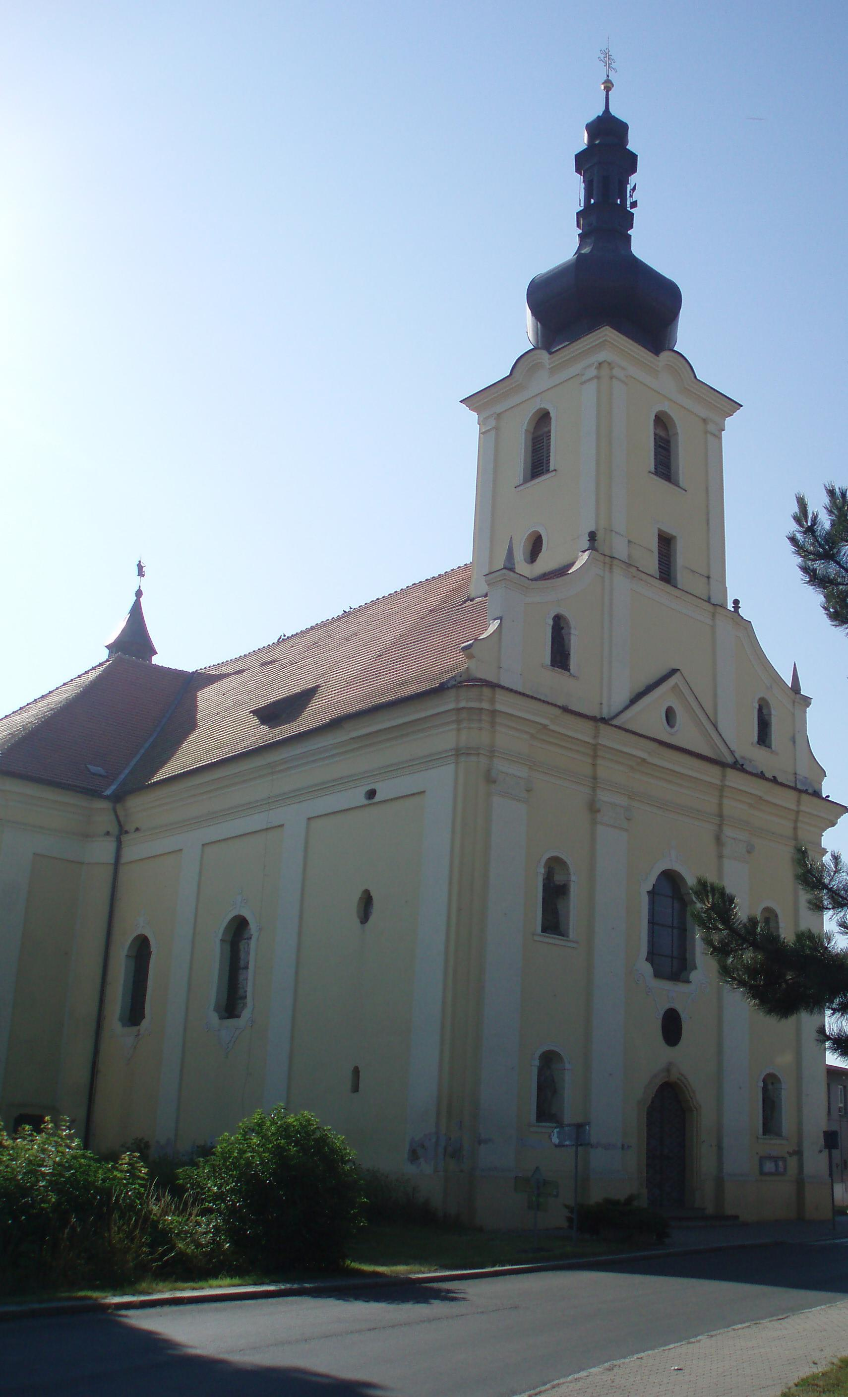
Church of Saint John the Evangelist

Blovice is located about 20 kilometres (12 mi) southeast of Plzeň. It lies in the Švihov Highlands. The highest point is a hill with an altitude of 559 m (1,834 ft). The Úslava River flows through the town.

There are several fishponds in the territory, the largest of which is Huťský rybník with an area of 8.8 ha (22 acres).

== History ==
The first written mention of Blovice is from 1284, when it was a market village owned by the Pomuk monastery. At the end of the 14th century, Blovice was first referred to as a market town. During the 15th and 16th centuries, Blovice prospered and acquired various rights.

Owners of Blovice often changed. The most notable owners were the Kolowrat-Krakowsky family, who purchased the estate in the late 17th century and held it until 1872. In the 18th century, Blovice was promoted to a town. In 1865–1868, the railway Plzeň–České Budějovice was built via the town and the character of the town began to change. From 1872 to 1918, the town was property of the Hungarian Pálffy ab Erdöd family.

== Demographics ==
Historical population

Year	Pop.	±%
1869	3,254	—
1880	3,469	+6.6%
1890	3,273	−5.7%
1900	3,222	−1.6%
1910	3,249	+0.8%

Year	Pop.	±%
1921	3,317	+2.1%
1930	3,818	+15.1%
1950	3,576	−6.3%
1961	3,696	+3.4%
1970	3,751	+1.5%

Year	Pop.	±%
1980	3,732	−0.5%
1991	3,591	−3.8%
2001	3,868	+7.7%
2011	4,177	+8.0%
2021	3,999	−4.3%

Source: Censuses

== Economy ==
The largest employer based in the town is ProMinent Systems. It is a manufacturer of dosing systems and plastic tanks with more than 300 employers.

== Transport ==
Blovice is located on the railway line Plzeň–Horažďovice.

== Sights ==
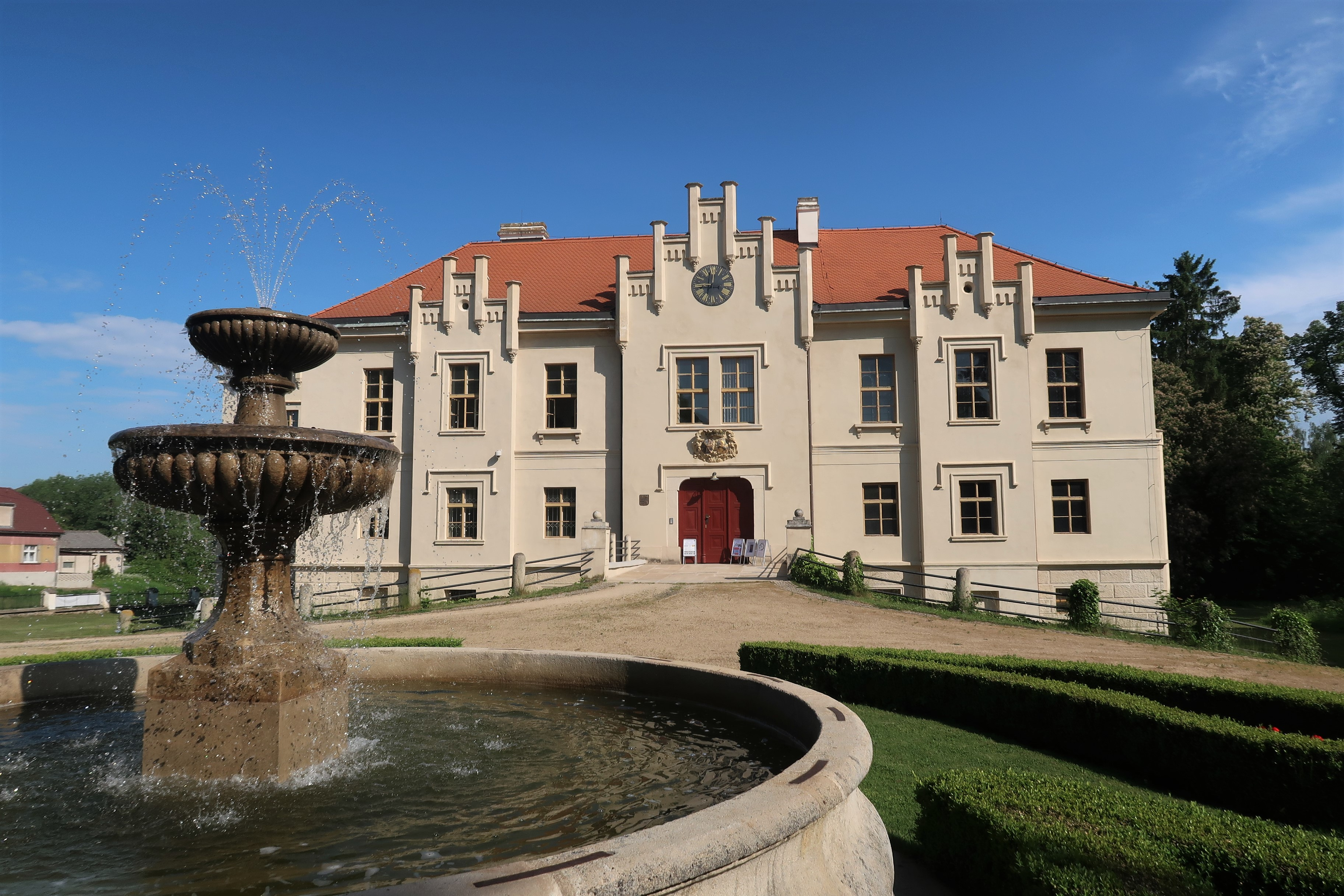
Hradiště Castle

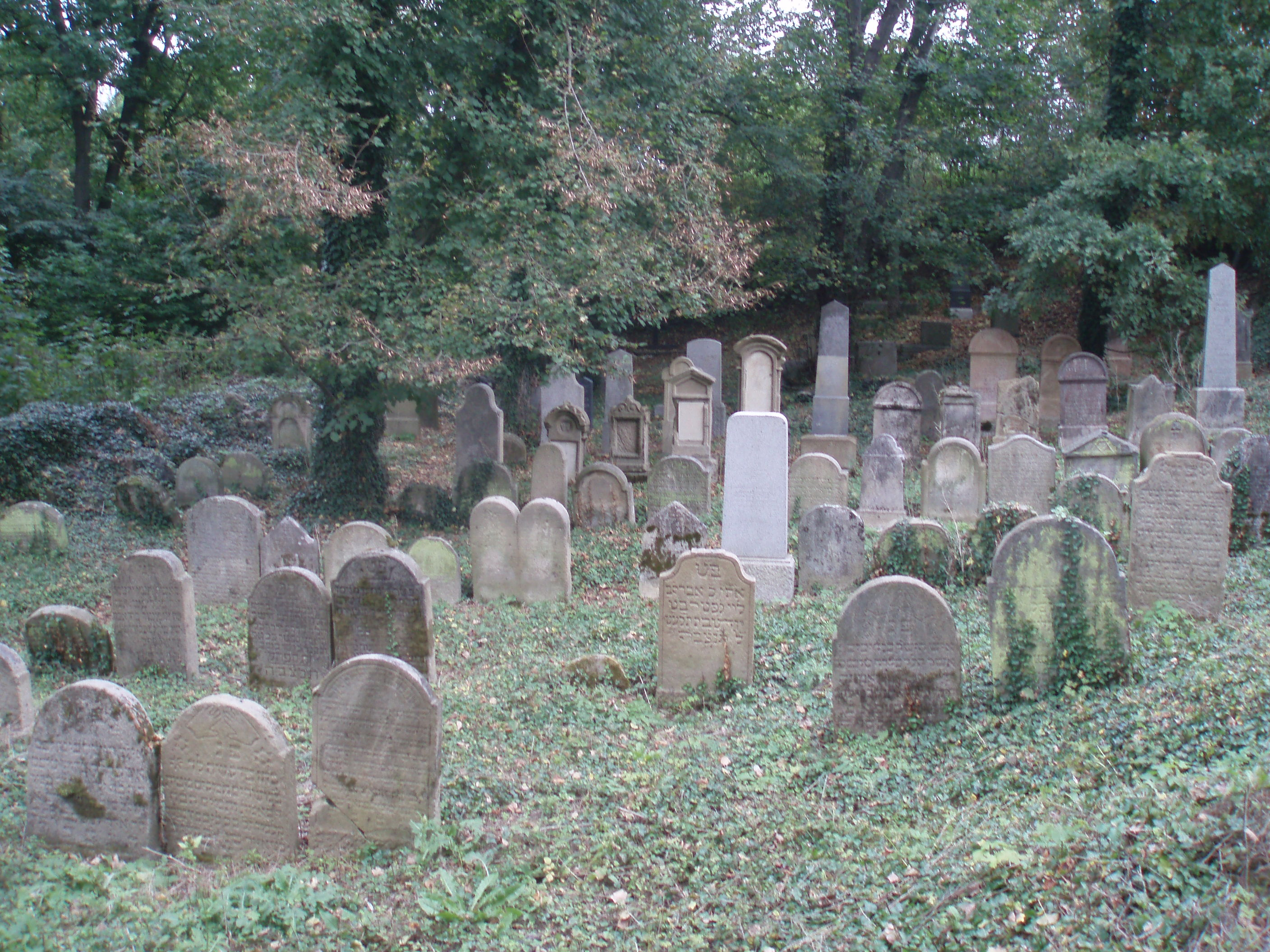
Jewish cemetery

The Church of Saint John the Evangelist was built in the Baroque style in 1760–1767. Next to the church is the Chapel of the Holy Cross with the tomb of the Kolowrat-Krakowsky and Pálffy families, which was rebuilt in 1833 from the original older building.

The main landmark of the town square is the town hall from 1825. In 1893, it was reconstructed in the pseudo-Gothic style. In front of the town hall is a sandstone statue of St. John of Nepomuk from 1702.

Hradiště Castle was built on the site of a former fortress in the 16th century, then baroque rebuilt in 1704 and 1726, and finally rebuilt in the pseudo-Gothic style in 1872–1874. Today it houses the Museum of Southern Plzeň Region.

The Jewish cemetery is a remnant of the Jewish community that existed in Blovice. It was allegedly founded in 1683. The cemetery has an area of 1,433 m^{2} (15,420 sq ft). Approximately 350 Baroque and Neoclassical tombstones have been preserved.

== Notable people ==
- Henri Blowitz (1825–1903), journalist
- Adolf Kraus (1850–1928), American lawyer
- Luděk Beneš (1937–2016), slalom canoer

== Twin towns – sister cities ==
Blovice is twinned with:

- Teublitz, Germany
- Triptis, Germany
