= Fiery serpents in Slavic folklore =

Spirit in Russian folklore

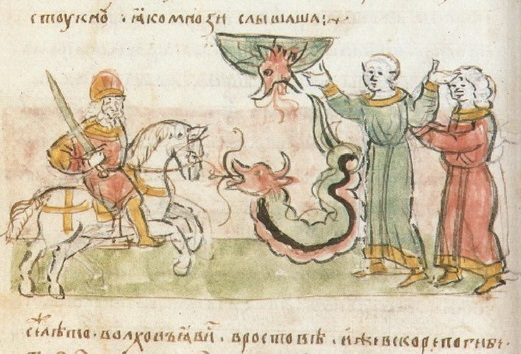
A fiery dragon (meteorite) that fell from the sky in 1091 during Vsevolod Yaroslavich's hunt near Vyshgorod ― Radziwiłł Chronicle

Fiery serpents (Russian: ognennyi zmei, Ukrainian: vohnyanyy zmiy, "fiery serpent"), among other names, in English otherwise known as firedrakes, are evil beings in Russian folklore, often shapeshifted demons or spirits.

In East Slavic tradition, the "fiery serpent" is said to generally resemble a fiery shaft (Russian: коромысло, "fiery carrying pole"), a flaming broom, or a glowing ball of blue fire, releasing sparks during its flight. This has been connected to the astronomical phenomena of bolides, shooting stars (meteors) or meteorites. Thus they are akin to firedrake-myth in other regions of the world.

== Nomenclature ==
In Russia, the ognennyi zmei is also known as the zmey lyubak (змей-любак, 'serpent-lyubak'), nalotnik (налётник, 'raider'), nalot (налёт, 'raid'), letun (летун, 'flyer'), or letuchiy (летучий, 'flying one'). Also man'yak (маньяк, 'beckoner' <"манить 'to beckon') or prelestnik (прелестник, 'charmer').

In the Ukraine, the perelesnyk (Перелесник, 'tempter, seducer'; var. perevésnyk переве́сник (Note: Also Havlová (1964) gives as alternate form perevésnyk, also noting reconstructed ancestral form *per-lьstьnik'ъ,)), aka pervonach (Первонач), is a demon in the form of a fiery snake (meteor) that flies towards women. It is also called litávetsʹ (літа́вець, 'flying one'), (Note: Also South Russian літавец.) litún (літу́н, 'flyer'), nalít (налі́т, 'raid'), or nalítnyk (налі́тник, 'raider'). The pan-Slavic "fiery serpent" has been termed vohnyanyy zmiy (вогняний змій) in Ukrainian.

The Belarus form is lietučij zmiej (летучий змей) for "flying serpent".

In the Serbian epic ballads, it is referred to as the ognyanik, or zmaj ognjeni "fiery dragon".

The Polish cognate is latawiec, ('the flying one') which is associated with the wind.

See tabulated format

Country	Name	Etymology
(Belarus) Belarusian	lietučij zmiej (летучий змей)	"flying serpent"
(Poland) Polish	latawiec	"the flying one", associated with the wind
(Russia) Russian	ognennyi zmei (огненный змей)	"fiery serpent"
(Russia) Russian	zmei ognennyi (змей огненный)	"serpent of fire"
(Russia) Russian	zmei-lyubak (змей-любак)	"serpent-lyubak"
(Russia) Russian	chobanets (хованец)	cf. Ukrainian: хованец (khovanets), вихованець (vykhovanets), "pupil, fosterling, nurseling", a Ukrainian house-spirit born from eggs
(Russia) Russian	nalotnik (налётник)	"raider", cf. Ukrainian: налі́тник
(Russia) Russian	nalot (налёт)	"raid", cf. Ukrainian: налі́т
(Russia) Russian	letun (летун)	"flyer", cf. Ukrainian: літу́н
(Russia) Russian	letuchiy (летучий)	"flying one"
(Russia) Russian	litavets (литавец)	"flying one", same form as Ukrainian: літа́вець, found in southern Russia
(Russia) Russian	man'yak (маньяк)	"beckoner", from "манить, manítʹ, "to beckon"
(Russia) Russian	prelestnik (прелестник)	"charmer"
(Serbia) Serbian	ognyanik (огнаник)	"fiery one", in the Serbian epic ballads
(Serbia) Serbian	zmaj ognjeni (змај огњени)	"fiery dragon", in the Serbian epic ballads
(Ukraine) Ukrainian	perelesnyk (перелесник)	"tempter, seducer"
(Ukraine) Ukrainian	perevésnyk (переве́сник)	"tempter, seducer" reconstructed ancestral form *per-lьstьnik'ъ
(Ukraine) Ukrainian	pervonach (первонач)	"tempter, seducer"
(Ukraine) Ukrainian	litávetsʹ літа́вець)	"flying one", also in southern Russian: литавец
(Ukraine) Ukrainian	litún (літу́н)	"flyer", cf. Russian: летун
(Ukraine) Ukrainian	nalít (налі́т)	"raid", cf. Russian: налёт
(Ukraine) Ukrainian	nalítnyk (налі́тник)	"raider", cf. Russian: налётник
(Ukraine) Ukrainian	vohnyanyy zmiy (вогняний змій)	"fire serpent", Ukrainian term for the pan-Slavic "fiery serpent"

== Origin ==
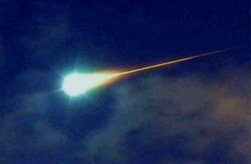
"Fiery serpents" – a flying bolide meteor

The association of shooting stars, bolides (cf. image right), and comets, with the fiery serpent is pan-Slavic (cf. § Historic examples, § Serbia), including Belarus, and association with bolides, meteorites and such heavenly stones among the East Slavs is not unique to that region.

According to Russian folk belief (around Tula), when the archangel Michael cast down the fallen angels, some of these devils evaded falling down to earth, and remained flying in the atmosphere in the form of fiery serpents. (Note: Kolchin (1899), cited and given in English by Ivanits.)

The origin of the Slavic myth is unknown, and the "fiery serpent" appears across the pan-Slavic world. The folklore mirrors various European folklore regarding demons and spirits (gnomes, wights, etc) shapeshifting into dragons (serpents) in order to protect and gather treasure, a motif seen in famous stories such as the Völsunga saga, and also connecting to the myth of "that which lies under a serpent grows with it", ie, dragons broods treasure to get richer. Other gnome traditions also carry over, such as the egg-lore of the Schrat etc (see § Egg lore).

According to Russian folk belief (around Tula), when the archangel Michael cast down the fallen angels, some of these devils evaded falling down to earth, and remained flying in the atmosphere in the form of fiery serpents. (Note: Kolchin (1899), cited and given in English by Ivanits.)

== Description ==
Demons took on various shapes, and the "fiery serpent" of the East and West Slavs, as well as the "flying serpent" of the Southern Slavs appeared as serpents in air, and as humans on ground. It releases sparks during its flight and enters the (women's) house through the chimney.

The serpent may bring gifts, but those gifts turn to horse manure at sunrise (Russian, west-Ukrainian). (Note: e.g. tale from Pereslavl-Zalessky. The woman was eating what she thought were treats brought by her dead husband, but they were nothing but sheep and horse dung to others who saw the "treats" in daylight.)

The evil spirit reputedly visits the woman at night-time (this may be a literary convention. cf. Fet's poem, § Fiery serpents in literature). Women who were widowed or separated from their husbands were particularly vulnerable to having affairs with this type of devil, because the devil would assume the shape of the dead or absentee husband. In their grief, and their desperation to be rejoined with their lost love, women do not recognize the serpent and become convinced that their lover has returned.

It is told that those who are visited by the serpent experience weight loss, exhibit signs of insanity and eventually commit suicide, or wither and die. In addition, victims of the serpent often experience hallucinations, including visions of supernatural torment, such as suckling on breasts which excrete blood rather than milk.

There are several ways to distinguish and identify the fiery serpent. Like any demon, it has no spinal cord (Russian). (Note: "Как и у всех демонов, у него нет спинного хребта ( рус . ) (Like all demons, he has no spine (Russian) )") and a woman can test if it is the real husband by feeling for his spine. It cannot correctly pronounce sacred Christian names, and instead of "Jesus Christ" (Иисус Христос) the serpent may say "Sus Christ" (Сус Христос), or instead of Bogoroditsa (Богородица, Mother of God) it can only say Chudoroditsa (Чудородица). (Note: Here chudo (чудо) means "miracle, wonder".) Other sources say the fiery serpent lacks the ability to hear and speak properly. And though the body may be human, it is multi-headed (Voronezh, Ukraine).

Superstition prescribes certain ways to ward against the devil, for example, the magical odolen herb (possibly valerian), or a decoction of burdock or its root stuck on the wall may serve as amulet (Russia). Reading the Psalter in a house where the serpent has already visited may help; or making the sign of the cross at entry points, such as window, door or stovepipe.

Mythology also tells that the fiery serpent had a son by a human woman, and she bore a werewolf (оборотень), the "Fiery Serpent Wolf" (Zmei Ognennyi Volk; Змей Огненный Волк). This son combatted and defeated his father. (Note: Kononenko's entry for "fiery serpent" explains this and also supplies a modern illustration of a wolf cub.) In Serbian epic literature, around the 15th century a mythical hero was transferred on to historical figures, namely, "Zmaj Ognjeni Vuk" (Змај Огњени Вук "Vuk the Fire Serpent/Dragon"; Vuk means "wolf") and became the double of Vuk Grgurević.

Thus women can have the fiery serpent's children, and illegitimate births are still often explained as such devil spawn. If a woman conceives a child with such a devil, the pregnancy will be exceedingly long, and the child will be born with black skin, with hooves instead of feet, eyes without eyelids and a cold body (Russia), or its body will be cold and jelly-like (East Ukraine). Such births are not viable, and the children die.

=== Egg lore ===
The wealth-bringing demon can be bred from an egg of a chicken (sometimes rooster, cf. below) aged 3, 5, 7, or 9, according to Slavic legend. In Russian, this demon is referred to as either ognennyi zmei ("fiery serpent") or chobanets (Note: Bushkevitch, S. P. Petuch (1995) Slavjanskaja mifologija Славянская мифология. p. 308 apud Olteanu (2002)) (analog to Ukrainian khovanets, хованец, vykhovanets, вихованець, a Ukrainian house spirit born from eggs) or perhaps just as "serpent" or "flying serpent". (Note: Shejn (1902) apud Kõiva & Boganeva (2022), p. 84) The creature that hatches is in the shape of a cat, according to Pavel Vasilievich Shejn, though it make take on the shape of either a cat, a train of fire, fire-sparks, or a young chicken according to a different source. At any rate, it transforms into a fiery streak at night to steal money, or grain for the house or landlady who hosts it, and in return it is expected to be fed Scrambled eggs or omelettes).

In Belarus, it is said that an egg laid by a (black) rooster (unusually shaped, like a snail) must be carried in one's bosom for 1 to 7 years (var. under the armpit for 3 years) for the small flying serpent to hatch. The Belarusian flying serpent is also referred to as in kletnik (клетнік. cf. § Belarus) and favours fried eggs or a scrambled eggs dish (Belarusian: яечня, яешня; yayechnya, yayeshnya) that is not overly salty. (Note: The favourite dish is designated fried eggs on Kõiva & Boganeva (2020), p. 395, and this term in English typically means "sunny-side up", i.e., cooking the cracked contents unbeaten. But the paper's bibliography cites the entry for "Yayechna" (glossed as "scrambled eggs") in the 2011 Mythology of Belarus dictionary, which suggests the favourite dish is scrambled. This is just the later edition of the 2004 dictionary already cited under Sanko's entry for "Kletnik", where he writes: "K[letnik]'s favorites dish is yayeshnya Улюбёная страва К. яешня", while the 2004 dictionary also has an entry written by L. Duchits Л. Дучыц alone entitled "Yayeshnya яешня" at p. 577–578, describing this egg item as a ritual dish especially among shepherds. But it does not clarify whether it was a beaten egg dish or not, only that it was sometimes baked on bonfire. According to the paper, the spelling has changed to yayechnya in the 2011 dictionary entry, and is co-authored by T. Valodzina Т. Валодзіна and Duchits. An English language food reference glosses yayechnya as meaning either fried egg or scrambled eggs in Belarus.)

=== Historic examples ===
An early sighting of the "fiery serpent" was recorded in a chronicle entry for the year 1092, which tells that the clouds darkened, and a great, three-headed snake with the heads aflame craned out of it, issuing fumes and noises, according to Ukraine writer Oleksiy Kononenko. The year 1092 was one of calamaities in Kievan Russia and Polotsk in Belarus according to the Primary Chronicle. (Note: 1092 was the year when the dead turned revenant in Polotsk.)

The preceding year, 1091, was also fraught with portents, such as the solar eclipse. Vsevolod Yaroslavich during hunt near Vyshgorod in 1091, witnessed a dragon-meteorite falling from the sky, as illustrated in the Radziwiłł Chronicle copy of the Primary Chronicle (cf. fig. at top), which has been recognized as an instance of a "fiery dragon" sighting, though scientifically considered to be a meteorite fall. The event is similarly recorded in the Laurentian Codex copy (of the Primary Chronicle).

=== In literature ===
Myths about the fiery serpent are found in Serbian epic songs as well as Russian byliny, and fairy tales (skazka). The term "fiery serpent" applied (sometimes) to the archetypal evil dragon dispatched by the dragon-slaying hero of bylina, such as Dobrynya Nikitich.

There has been recorded the spell or zagovory (заговор) to protect a woman against the incursion of the flying serpent, and the lengthy recitation names the "fiery serpent". Another spell, for a military man going to war, also invokes the "fiery serpent". There is an incantation (Ukrainian: Замовляння, zamovlyannya) acting as a love charm, where the fire serpent is supposed to act as a magical creature which arouses a woman's passion.

In The Tale of Peter and Fevronia (16th century), this devil in serpent form flew to the wife of Prince Pavel, brother of Prince Peter of Murom.

The image of a fiery serpent was described by the Russian poet Afanasy Afanasievich Fet in his ballad, Zmei (Змей, "Serpent"), written in 1847, where a young widow is visited by a serpent from the night sky.

The perelesnyk features in the play The Forest Song (1911) by Ukrainian writer Lesia Ukrainka.

== Belarusian folklore ==
The fiery "flying serpent"（летучий змей, лятучага змея; lietučij zmiej, liatučaha zmiej of Belarus exhibit two aspects, that of the wealth-bringing spirit and that of the "mythological lover" (i.e., mythological creature as lover). The fiery flying serpent of the house is also designated kletnik or klietnik (клетнік, from клеці, "granary, pantry", where it is said to dwell). The Belarusian flying serpent likes to be fed fried eggs or scrambled eggs (Belarusian: яєчня, яешня; yayechnya, yayeshnya) that must not be overly salty, lest it anger the demon which will exact some form of retribution using fire. If someone is doing unusually well financially, others will quip about him that "the serpent brings him money" (Яму змей грошы носіць).

The "wealth-bringing spirit" motif is related to various house spirit myths of Europe, such as the Nordic gnome (nisse), wight (vätte) and Estonian kratt (among others), which helps around the farm and bring wealth to those they like, but they also collect treasure, which they guard by shapeshifting into dragons and thereof. This myth is further related to myths of undeads resurrecting as various monsters, not uncommonly dragons, to guard something precious, such as a buried treasure, a grave or a past home, further the root of various ghostlore.

== Polish folklore ==
The Polish version is latawiec (Note: Levkievskaya citing Pel.PDL : 47) ('the flying one') which was originally an air spirit that could conjure up winds, and regarded as a sort of bird with plumage, though the witch's endeared one is described as a hairy little man, also appearing in the guise of a serpent. There is conflation between the demon latawiec and the house sprite skrzat (cf. German: Schrat, Estonian Swedish skrat, Estonian: kratt). The latawiec-skrzat demands milk kasha (kaszą) or porridge, but it must not be too hot or it will anger the spirit.

== Russian folklore ==
One story recounts how the flying serpent (Russian: змей летающий; zmei letayushchiy) had an affair with a certain woman, but would remove his wings and tuck them under the roof, before entering her house and making his dalliances. A gypsy (cygán) noticed and hid the wings, compelling the serpent never to see the woman again (Tula Governorate).

A legend about the letun ("flyer"), i.e. fiery dragon recorded in the old capital of Pereslavl-Zalessky, describes a woman who believed she was visited by her dead husband and wasted away. The family took measures to drive it out, hiring a woman to read the psalter, and awaiting in guard of the woman as it visited. The father-in-law's threat of strangulation kept it away.

A shooting star in the steppes is considered a "fiery serpent" according to folk belief. An incident is recollected by Aleksandr Aleksandrovich Cherkasov, mine engineer and writer that when a meteor streaked the sky in the Siberian taiga, workers started shouting "zmei (serpent)!" as the meteor was called ognennyi zmei colloquially, and the older men took them to be either a good or bad omen.

== Serbian folklore ==
In Serbia, a fire serpent is classed as a being in the "dragon-meteorite" category, which is generally benevolent and can mate with human females, but are also blamed for droughts when they overstay their welcome.

It is also contended the Serbian epic ballads call it ognjanik or ognyanik (огњаник, which could mean 'fireworks'). This South Slavic ognyanik dwells in mountain caves, sometimes above the clouds. The dragon is covered in scales, and breathes fire, sometimes its mouth glinting like a flash of lightning. The ognyanik of legend has heroic prowess, hoards treasures, knows herbal lore including aphrodisiacs, charms women.

There is Serbian epic song entitled "Zmaj ognjeni i troglav Arapin (The fiery dragon and the three-headed Arab)".

== Ukrainian folklore ==
In Ukraine, the pan-Slavic "fiery serpent" has been termed vohnyanyy zmiy (вогняний змій, "fiery serpent"). It is primarily a demon in the form of a fiery snake (meteor) that flies towards women.

According to Eastern Ukrainian legends, whilst traveling, the fiery serpent strews beautiful gifts along the road to lure grieving women and villagers, including beads, rings, belts/girdles and handkerchiefs/headscarves. (Note: Russian: "кольцо , бусы , пояс , платок".) If the woman then picks it up, the evil spirit will fly to her.

In Ukraine, there is also the belief that the spirit of the dead husband turns into a perelesnyk and visits the bereaved wife, especially if the widow's yearning for him is strong, visiting his grave frequently, etc. But the perelesnyk is harmful, draining her by drinking blood, or suffocating her. He is difficult to eradicate, requiring the service of a vorozhbyt (ворожбит, soothsayer) with a spell or potion. (Cf. Legend of Russian letun above).

== Baltic folklore ==
Some commentators see some parallel between the Belarus flying serpent, etc., with the Lithuanian aitvaras, which also brings riches, love to be fed egg dishes, and retributes using fire. But similar lore may be widespread simply due to the pan-European mythology of basilisks disseminated during medieval times, or perhaps somewhat later in the 16th century.

Some commentators also see some parallel between the Estonian kratt (Estonian Swedish: skrat, cf. Schrat), and the Belarusian flying serpent, with the caviat that the Estonian version fails to act as an ardent lover to a human woman. The kratt can manifest itself as a fiery being with a sparking tail, which in some variants is a dragon analog to the firedrake of Swedish folklore, called flogdrake, intended as a mean to guard and transport their treasures. The Swedish flogdrake was likewise thought to transport treasure it had stolen. The kratt is also related to the Swedish folklore of Nordic gnomes and wights, which also are said to transform themselves into dragons and thereof to both guard and transport their treasures. The same motif is also found in the related Northern German Schrat (Low German: puk, Estonian: puuk), which likewise can transform into a dragon to handle treasure and thereof.

== See also ==
- Aitvaras – Nature spirit in Lithuanian mythology
- Drak (mythology) – Infernal familiar and domestic sprite from German folklore
- Chuvash dragon – Legendary winged fire-breathing and shape-shifting creature in Chuvash legends
- Firedrakes in English folklore
- Flogdrake (firedrakes in Swedish folklore)
- Incubus – Mythological demon that seduces women
- Kratt – Magical creature from Estonian mythology
- Mavka – Female spirit in Ukrainian mythology
- Wawel Dragon – Creature in Polish folklore
- Zburător – Supernatural being in Romanian folklore
- Zmei (Russian) – Dragon or serpent in Russian mythology
