= Firedrakes in English folklore =

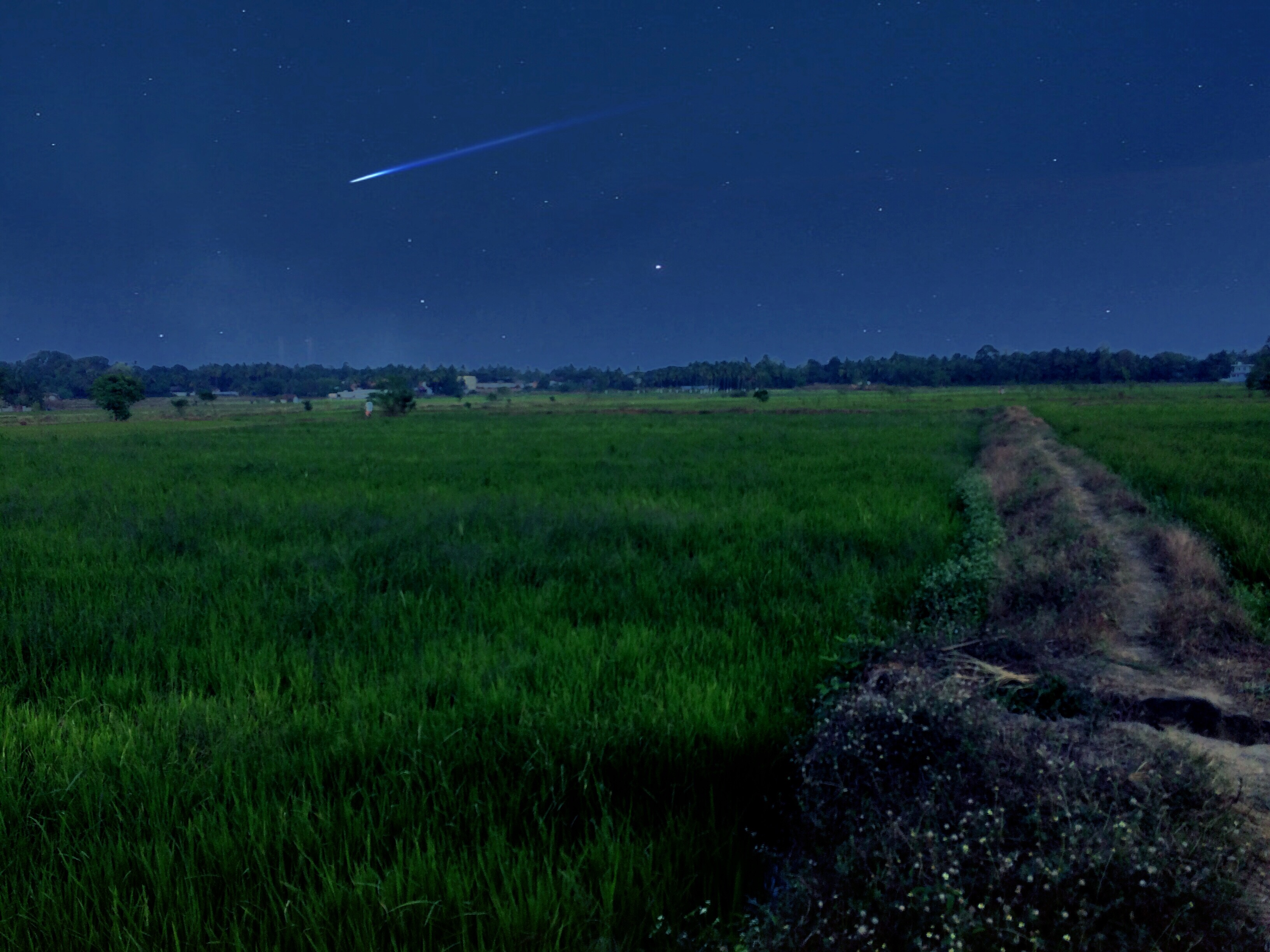
Firedrakes are said to appear as sparking streaks of light flying across the sky akin to shooting stars or will-o'-the-wisps

Firedrakes in English folklore (also written uncompounded: fire-drake; Old English: fyrdraca) are obscure, but still appear in various old stories, poetry, and even Shakespeare. Firedrakes are dragon-sightings stemming from shooting stars and will-o'-the-wisps, said to appear as dragon-shaped fireballs or sparking streaks of fire in the sky, and the term also appears as a synonym for the above, including "fiery dragon" and "fiery meteor". While not unique to English folklore, the firedrake have often been thought to be the Devil himself in dragon shape.

== Etymology ==
The term firedrake utilizes the inherited indigenous form drake (Old English: draca), instead of the more common French borrowing dragon (Old French: dragon). The construction appears as early as Beowulf from the 8th to the 9th century, Old English: fyrdraca:

Þa wæs þeodsceaða, þriddan siðe,
frecne fyrdraca, fæhða ȝemyndiȝ.

Translation:

Now for a third time neared the destroyer (folk-scather);
The fire-drake fierce, old feuds remembering

— Translated by John Duncan Spaeth (1911)

This fyrdraca has been rendered "firedrake" elsewhere, an early example being John Josias Conybeare's 1826 translation of Beowulf. (Note: Note that the figurative translation appears in other languages, for example Norwegian Bokmål: elddrake (lit. 'fire-dragon'), but with no connection to the folklorical phenomenon.)

Cognate or analog terms to "fire-drake" also exist for the same phenomenon in other languages, for example Swedish: elddrake, eldsdrake (lit. 'fire-drake, fiery drake'), Russian: огненный змей ognennyi zmei (lit. 'fiery serpent/dragon', see Zmei), Ukrainian: вогняний змій vohnyanyy zmiy (lit. 'fiery serpent/dragon', see Zmiy).

== Description ==
=== As dragons ===
Firedrakes are quite obscure in English context. The lexicographer James Murray wrote the following definition for firedrake in volume 5 of the Oxford English Dictionary (1901):

A 'fiery dragon'; a mythical creature belonging to Germanic superstition.

This description presumably includes the foregoing example of fyrdraca from Beowulf, for although this work is an example of Old English (Anglo-Saxon) poetry, its cast of characters, including the titular hero are Scandinavian, therefore, the material itself is more widely "Germanic".

Shakespeare in Henry VIII comically describes a tinker or brazier (who works with fire) as a red-nosed "firedrake", (Note: OED s.v. "Fire-drake", sense 4b: "a man with a fiery nose".) and the extended analogy to a fire-breathing dragon is clear from the further description below:

“that fire-drake did I hit three times on the head, and three times was his nose discharged against me; he stands there, like a mortar-piece, to blow us.” (Note: Henry VIII V. iii.)

=== As meteors ===
Around the Renaissance period, the term "fire drake" acquired the meaning of a "fiery meteor" or else a "will-o'-the-wisp" (ignis fatuus). Note that the term "meteor" originally designated "any atmospheric phenomenon", and was not specific to a type of heavenly body.

16th-century Puritan theologian William Fulke in his book Meteors (1563) dedicates a section on what he interchangeably calls "fire-drake" and "flying dragon", presumably describing the will-o'-the-wisp: (Note: After Halliwell-Phillipps's note on "fire-drake", explaining it to be "Will O' the Wisp or ignis fatuus", and mentioning the below-quoted passage in Fulkes's Meteors as one example.)

Of flying Dragons or fire-Drakes. Flying Dragons, or as Englishmen call them, fire-Drakes, be caused on this manner. When a certain quantity of vapors are gathered together on a heap, being very near compact, & as it were hard tempered together, this lump of vapors ascending to the region of cold, is forcibly beaten back, which violence of moving is sufficient to kindle it; although some men will have it to be caused between two clouds, a hot and a cold; then the highest part, which was climbing upward, being by reason more subtile and thin, appeareth as the Dragons neck, smoking, for that it was lately in the repulse bowed or made crooked, to represent the Dragons belly. The last part by the same repulse turned upward, make the tayl, appearing smaller, for that it is both further off, and also for that the cold bindeth it. This Dragon thus being caused, flieth along in the air, and sometime turneth to and fro, if it meet with a cold cloud to beat it back, to the great terrour of them that behold it: of whom some call it a fire-Drake: some say it is the Devil himself, and so make report to others.

Fulke is possibly alluding to the fact there are analog names in other languages (for example, the Swedish term for firedrake is flogdrake, "fly-dragon"), as he specifies that "firedrake" is the term used by "Englishmen".

Note that Fulke actually remarks on the ignis fatuus separately shortly after, providing a similar yet somewhat different explanation that it ("foolish fire") is caused by "Exhalation kindled by meanes of violent moving, when by cold of the night, in the lowest region of the ayre..", etc. Fulke remarks that this fire is harmless, and only fools are afraid of it. (Note: "ignis fatuus, foolish fire, that hurteth not, but onely feareth fooles") (Note: Thus if foolish fire is harmless, "kindling" does not necessarily ignite fire that burns, even in Fulke's discussion of the fire-drake phenomenon above.)

== Folklore ==
=== Connection with the Devil ===
Dragons are primarily evil beings in European folklore, more than often shapeshifted demons or spirits, and in English context firedrakes have often been thought to be the Devil himself in dragon shape (cf. Flogdrake).

Fulke, in his book Meteors (1563), also tells of an event from around 1515 when a firedrake-phenomenon was thought by locals to be the Devil flying over London:

More than 47. years ago, on May day, when many young folk went abroad early in the morning, I remember by six of the clock in the forenoon, there was news come to London, that the Devil, the same morning, was seen flying over the Thames: afterward came word that he sighted at Stratford, and there was taken and set in the Stocks, and that though he would fain have dissembled the matter, by turning himself into the likeness of a man, yet was he known well enough by his cloven foot. I knew some then living, that went to see him, and returning, affirmed, that he was feen flying in the air, but was not taken prisoner. I remember also, that some wished he had been shot at with Guns or shafts, as he flew over the Thames. Thus do ignorant men judge of these things that they know nor. As for this Devil, I suppose it was a flying Dragon, whereof we speak, very fearfull to look upon, as though he had life, because he moveth, whereas it is nothing else but clouds and smoak: so mighty is God, that he can fear his enemies with these and such like operations, whereof some examples may be found in holy Scripture.

Various poets have used the term firedrake as a kenning or noa-name for Satan or other personification of evil and deceit, etc:

- John Gower (1393):

Somtime the firedrake it semeth,
And so the lewde people it demeth.

Translation:

Sometime the firedrake it seems (appears)
And so the lewd people it deems (tests of virtue/fortitude)

- John Skelton (1522):

- That he wolde than make / The devyls to quake,
- To shudder and to shake, / Lyke a fyerdrake.

Translation:

- That he would than make / The devils to quake,
- To shudder and to shake, / Like a firedrake.

- George Wilkins (1607):

Who should be lamps to comfort out our way,
And not like firedrakes to lead men astray.

- "Tom o' Bedlam" (c. 1620):

When I short have shorn my sow's face / And swigged my horny barrel, / In an oaken inn I pound my skin / As a suit of gilt apparel;
The moon's my constant mistress, / And the lowly owl my marrow; The flaming drake and the night crow make / Me music to my sorrow.

- George Chapman (1631):

So have I seen a fire drake glide at midnight / before a dying man to point his grave, / and in it stick and hide.

=== Topsell's exemplum ===
Naturalist Edward Topsell in his The History of Serpents (1608), writes on the fire-drake phenomenon, occurring on both land and sea, which commentators interpret to be a description of the will-o'-the-wisp.

Topsell also inserts a piece of English folklorical exemplum under the "Of Dragons" heading of this work, which relates that a "fire-drake" (the meteor draco volans) appeared before a certain old fisherman and his crew, based in the west coast of England. The alarmed seamen hurried to leave, remembering a ship had been recently lost at this same spot, but the net felt snagged and took an effort to recover, until finally they dragged up a golden chair. The two crewmen overtaken by greed murdered the captain and tried to flee to France thinking they had wealth enough to live out their lives. But they ignored the warnings of a man-of-war to approach for a search, were fired upon by cannons, to their deaths. The story is recognized as cognate to "The Pardoner's Tale" in Chaucer's Canterbury Tales.

== See also ==
- Drak (mythology)
- Fiery serpents in Slavic folklore
- Firedrake (folklore)
- Flogdrake
- Kobold#Fire phenomena
