= Fiery serpent =

Fiery serpent may refer to:

== Mythology and folklore ==
- Boitatá, a Brazilian will-o'-the-wisp or legendary creature
- Fiery flying serpent, a creature mentioned in the Bible
- Firedrake (folklore), fiery flying serpents in European folklore
  - Fiery serpents in Slavic folklore
- Xiuhcōātl, an Aztec mythological serpent

== Other uses ==
- Dracunculus medinensis, or Guinea worm, a nematode causing dracunculiasis
