= Flogdrake =

Nordic dragon type

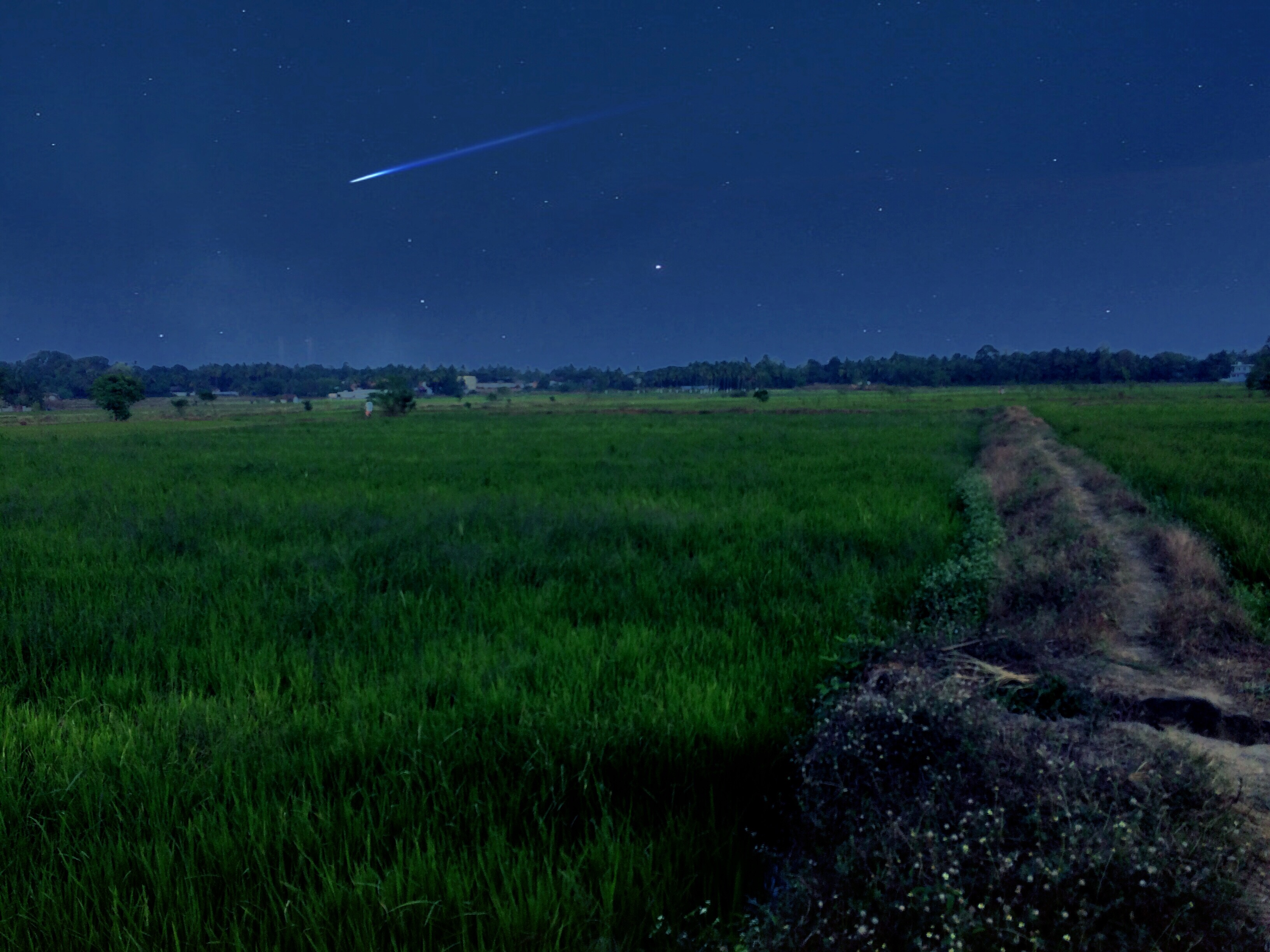
The flogdrake travels over the sky as a streak of light akin to a falling star

Flogdrake (Old Swedish: floghdraki, flughdraki; Finnish: louhikäärme), also elddrake or eldsdrake (lit. 'fire dragon, fiery dragon'), dialectally also godsdrake (Dalecarlian: gussdratji, lit. 'goods dragon'), is a type of dragon in Swedish folklore, and to a lesser extent Finnish and Estonian folklore (see kratt), by analogy a variation of the Pan-European firedrake myth; it is a wingless worm-dragon that flies across the sky while glowing, looking like a streak of fire or light akin to a shooting star, while living in mountain tunnels that it bores.

Related myths also exist in Northern Germany, for example the Schrat.

== Etymology ==
Swedish: flogdrake derives from Old Swedish: floghdraki (including the form flughdraki), meaning ”fly-dragon”, and initially referred to just flying dragons, as opposed to non-flying ones. The term is a literary loan from Old Norse: flugdreki.

Laurentius Petri (1499–1573) potentially used the term figuratively in its later sense in 1568, in his translation of the Book of Isaiah (Jesaia Prophete på nyt öffuerseedd, "Isaiah Prophet, translated a new"). He used it there to translate Seraph (Hebrew: שרף) in 14:29 – a biblical being, in this sense, a burning winged serpent – see fiery flying serpent. Isaiah 14:29 generally says something akin to: "Do not rejoice, all you Philistines, that the rod that struck you is broken; from the root of that snake will spring up a viper/basilisk, and its fruit/offspring will be a flying Seraph", in which Petri translated the last part as: "en brinnande floghdrake" ("a burning fly-dragon").

=== In Finnish ===
From Old Swedish, the term was borrowed into Finnish as a partial calque, there becoming louhikäärme, "louhi serpent". The fore element, flogh, was borrowed, in Finnish becoming louhi (compare Swedish: Stockholm vs Finnish: Tukholma), and the aft element, draki ("dragon"), translated as serpent, the old word for dragon (compare worm-dragon, zmei-dragon).

In folk etymology, the term later evolved into lohikäärme ("salmon serpent"), the modern Finnish word for dragon. However, the etymology for louhi has also been speculated to stem from elsewhere. Some have speculated a connection with the Finnish witch-goddess Louhi, which might originally have meant "witch, spellcaster" etc (then roughly "supernatural snake"). The Finnish folklorist and mythologist Martti Haavio connected the name with Swedish: flog, but then speculating that the goddess had an earlier connection with flying. Other speculations have derived the lead from the verb louhia ("to mine, quarry, shatter" etc), to lovi ("cleft, crack"), which then connects to the trait that the dragon would drill into mountains (then roughly "mine snake"). Another theory connects it with the rare archaic word louhi, meaning "lightning" ("lightning serpent"), then figuratively to the dragon's appearance in the sky.

== Description ==
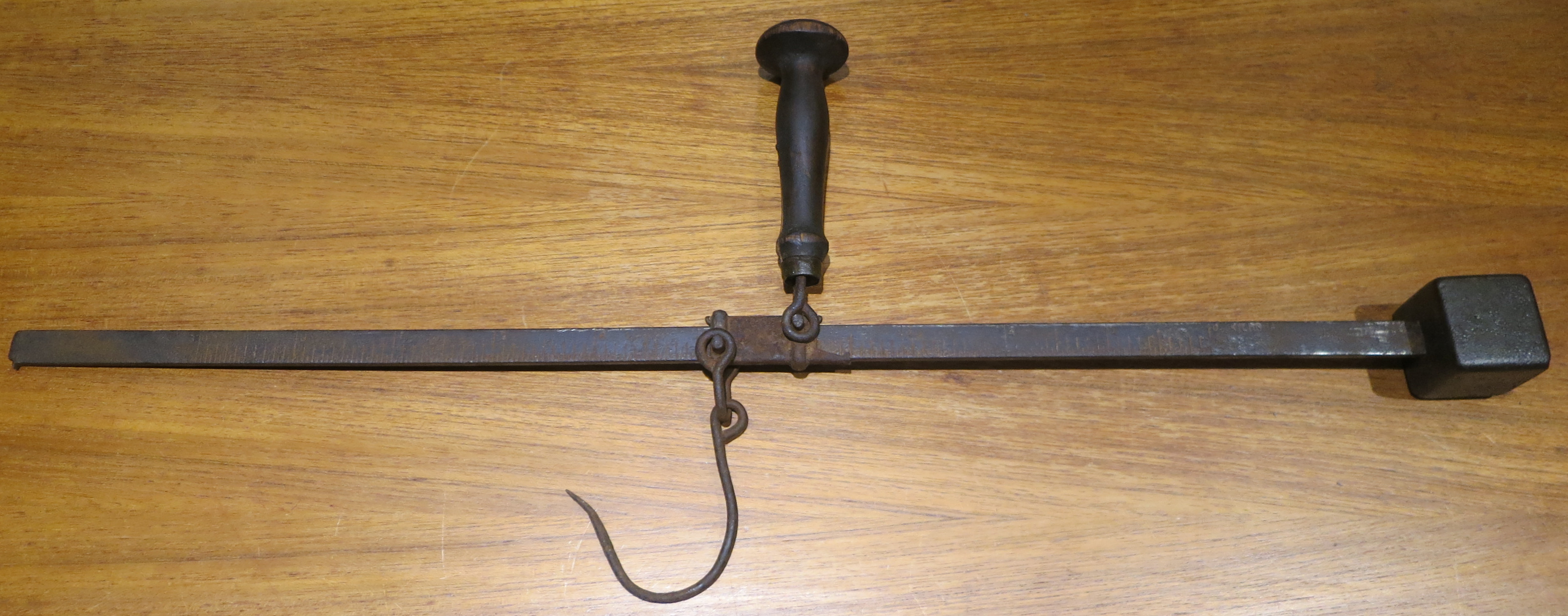
The flogdrake is said to resemble an old Swedish steelyard balance

The flogdrake, as opposed to the treasure-guarding dragon, "is rarely seen in its true form, but more often observed streaking through the air like a flame", wrote Leonhard Fredrik Rääf (1856). (Note: Rääf (1856). quoted in Svenska Akademiens Ordbok, s.v. "flogdrake".)

Thus the flogdrake can be compared to the eastern dragon in that it can fly despite lacking any visible wings. Unlike eastern dragons, however, Germanic dragons are always portrayed as evil. It is said to come flying in the evening sky surrounded by sparks, looking like a golden stripe that sweeps across the sky. It is large and seems to lack limbs, but is said to resemble a steelyard balance in shape, essentially like a long tadpole.

Some interpret the fire streak phenomenon as the dragon "firing over his possessions" or "illuminating his goods", and thus pointing out where the treasure or dragon's nest is to be found. The dictionary "Dictionary of the vernacular languages of upper Dalarna" (Ordbok över folkmålen i övre Dalarna) gives the definition for godsdrake (lit. 'goods dragon') as: "fire ball which appeares above hidden treasure". It also mentions godseld (lit. 'goods fire'): "fire indicating the presence of ore or hidden treasure".

Others interpret the fire streak as the dragon itself. Swedish archivist Carl-Martin Bergstrand wrote in 1947 the following in his book about Bohuslän legends:

The old talk about the dragon. He came like a firebroom, it was as if someone had set fire to a sheaf of straw. He flew high in the air. Most people thought it was the devil, but some said that it couldn't be, because he wouldn't be let loose until the end of time. Then there were some who thought it would be the Last Judgment when they saw a dragon.

=== Connection to mountains ===
The flogdrakes are said to have lived in mountains. They would drill into the rock mass, thus digging large tunnels, so-called drakarör (lit. 'dragon tubes'), where they would dwell and hide their treasures.

In Carl Gustaf Åström's writing "Om bergoljeborrningarne i Dalarne" ("About the oil drilling in Dalarna") from 1869, he tells of the Osmund mountain in Rättvik, Dalarna, Sweden, and that the so-called "flogeld" ("fly-fire") had been seen around the mountain, or "as the common people say, that the dragon flies in the mountains". The bookkeeper Olof Larsson in the 1730s is said to have "several times seen such sweeping over his farm, coming from the northwest, and striking into the Osmund mountain". Åström also mentions that such "fly-fire" still occasionally appeared at Gulleråsen in Dalarna.

=== Connection with wights and gnomes ===
Wights and gnomes (and similar beings) of Nordic folklore have at times been associated with flogdrakes due to sometimes being accompanied by fire phenomena. Wights, who often appear as gnomes with red top hats, are said to have transformed into flogdrakes at times, in addition to ordinary Swedish lindworms. In some beliefs, the dragon brings with it goods that it has stolen.

This mythological pattern also occurs elsewhere, such as in the Baltic states and Northern Germany, where gnomes, such as the German-Slavic Schrat/Puk, and Estonian derivative kratt/puuk (Estonian Swedish: skrat), appear at night as a "fiery dragon" or thereof. The two beliefs are also found merged as a household dragon with the characteristics of a house spirit, called puk (puks, puck, pukis, pukys, pukje, puuk, kaukas, krukis, pisuhand, tulihand, etc).

== See also ==
- Firedrake (folklore)
