= Kratt =

Magical creature from Estonian mythology

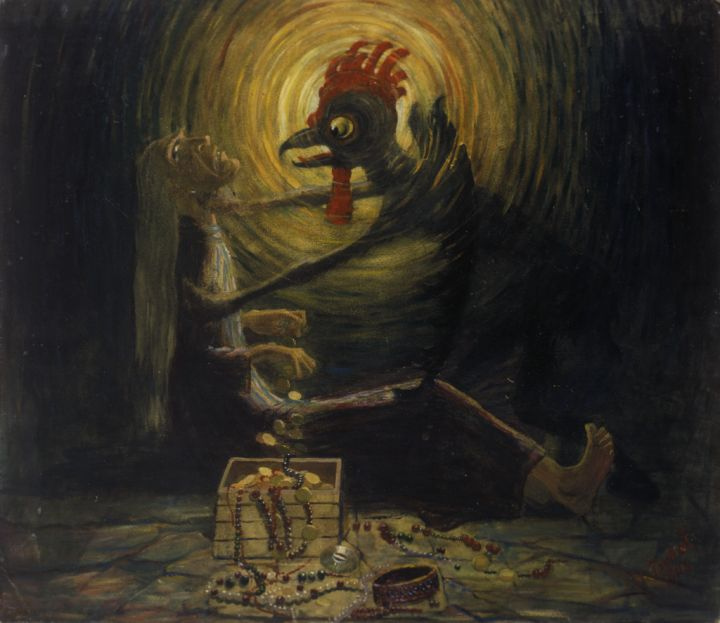
Kratt (Aleksander Promet, ca 1906)

Kratt (Estonian Swedish skrat), also pisuhänd, puuk, tulihänd, vedaja, is a magical creature in Estonian mythology, a treasure-bearer. In Votic, a similar creature is called lemmüz. In Finnish mythology, there is a treasure guardian called Kratti or Aarni.

Kratt is related to the Germanic and Slavic Schrat (cf. Estonian Swedish skrat, Polish: skrzat), also known as Puck (cf. Estonian: puuk, Swedish: puke, Low German: Puk), but also Nordic gnomes and wights, and they likewise sometimes transform into firedrakes (see flogdrake) or thereof dragons to transport and guard their treasures.

== Description ==
=== Estonia ===
A kratt was a creature formed from hay or of old household implements by its master, who then had to give the Devil three drops of blood to bring life to the kratt.

The kratt was notable for doing everything the master ordered it to and was mostly used for stealing and bringing various goods for the kratt's owner. It was said to be able to fly around. An interesting aspect of the kratt is that it was necessary for it to constantly keep working, otherwise it would turn dangerous to its owner. Once the kratt became unnecessary, the master of the kratt would ask the creature to do impossible things such as build a ladder from bread, as portrayed in Andrus Kivirähk's Rehepapp (The Old Barny). Impossible tasks took so long to complete that it caused the kratt, which was made of hay, to catch fire and burn to pieces, thus solving the issue of how to get rid of the problematic creature.

In folk astronomy, a bolide was thought to be a kratt that had been given an impossible job. The enraged kratt was thought to catch on fire and burn away as a fireball.

=== Finland ===
In Finnish context, Kratti was first mentioned in 1551 by Mikael Agricola as a false god worshipped by Tavastians, and who "took care of items" (Cratti murhen piti Tavarast). Christfried Ganander wrote in 1789 that it was a Tavastian god of money, meaning skratt (Swedish 'laughter'). It ruled over buried treasure and would not reveal the location of one without proper offerings and sacrifices of animals. It sometimes showed treasure chests on ground or water, but later hid them again if it wasn't feeling favourable. Aarni is described as a ghost and a haltija of hidden treasure. It could be seen on sunny weather, or during night by a fire, in forests and on hills, drying up and scouring its moldy treasures.

A place where a treasure had been buried is called an aarnihauta 'Aarni pit'. The pit was sometimes burning with aarnituli or aarnivalkea 'Aarni fire', especially on Midsummer night when the haltija of the pit was drying up the treasure and burning fires. An aarnihauta could be found on Midsummer night if one held a piece of steel in their left hand and waved it over the ground while chanting: "Dear haltija, / give me your treasure now, / Aarni open your pit, / light up your fire and light, / so we may have what's in the pit." A fire lights up where the aarnihauta is. If one threw a firestriker into the fire, they got the treasure. If one wanted to hide treasure so no one finds it, while digging the pit they could ask the haltija to not give the treasure to anyone, at least without a specific sacrifice.

A creature which brings its owner treasure, butter, cream etc. from other houses, similar to the Estonian kratt, is called para in Finnish and was often thought to resemble a grey or black cat.

== In popular culture ==
The kratt has notably appeared in the works of Andrus Kivirähk, the Estonian author, whose work often draws upon Estonian mythology and presents it in a humorous and fairy-tale-like way. His book Rehepapp ehk November (Old Barny aka November) offers a description that suggests Estonians might have used blackcurrant berries instead of blood to cheat the Devil and save their souls from going to hell.

Estonian composer and conductor Eduard Tubin (1905–1982) wrote a ballet titled Kratt, which is entirely based on folk tunes. It is the first Estonian ballet and it deals with topics like: Will money bring happiness, How can damnation be born from greed, and Will there be a place for love in a world that puts such a great value on material goods.

The 2017 film November, based on Kivirähk's book, features kratt and other elements of Estonian folklore.

== Modern usage ==
The similarity of kratts to artificial intelligences has resulted that in Estonia this character is used as a metaphor for AI and its complexities. For instance, algorithmic-liability law is also called the Kratt law.
