= Drude =

Malevolent nocturnal spirit in German folklore

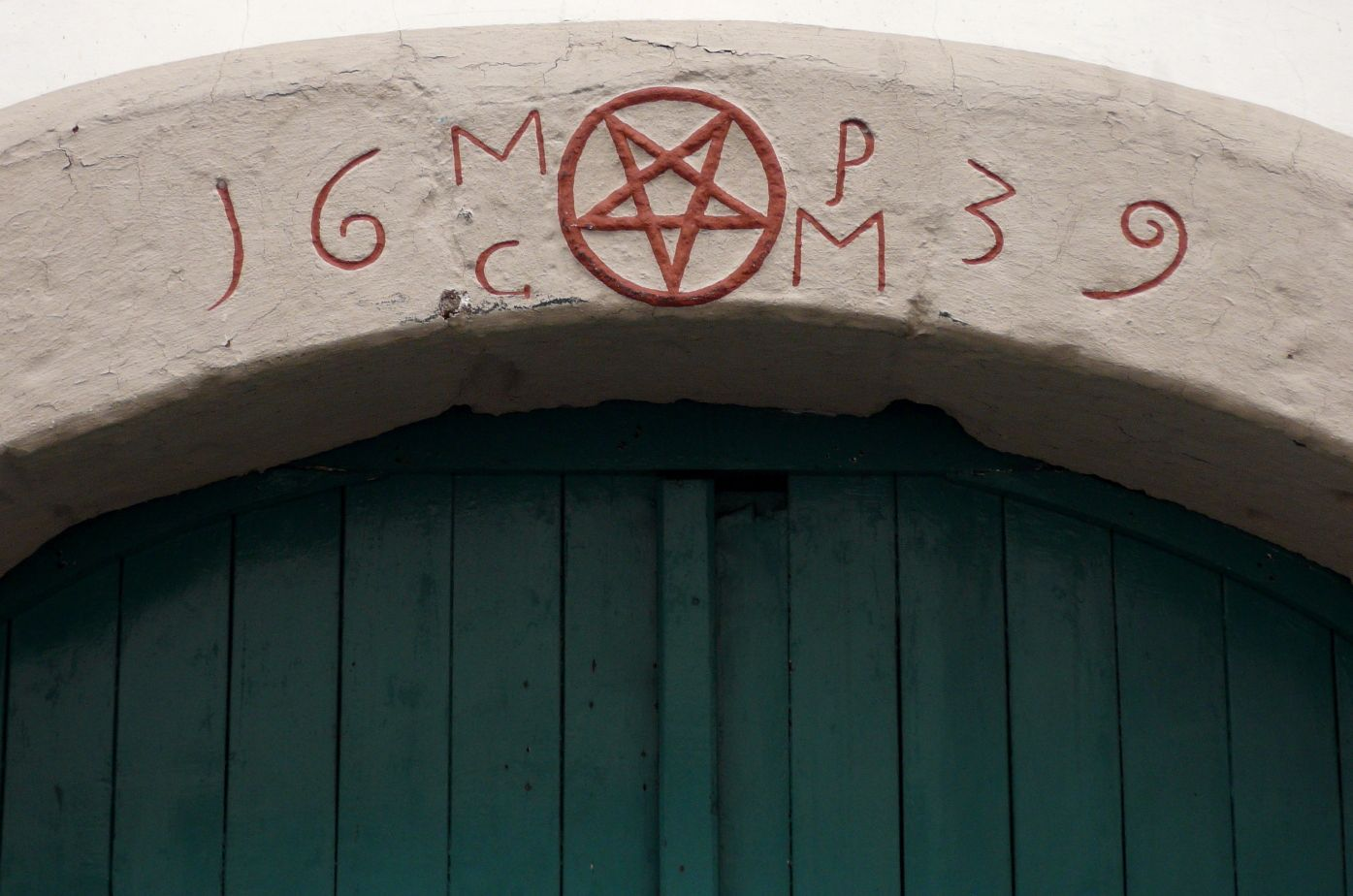
Drudenfuss dated 1639 on a door lintel. —house in Ahrweiler, Rhineland-Palatinate

In German folklore, a drude (German: Drude, German: [ˈdʁuːdə], pl. Druden) is a kind of malevolent female nocturnal spirit in Germanic mythology, a sort of alp or witch-hag associated with nightmares, prevalent especially in Southern Germany.

It also occurs in the form or trude.

== Nomenclature ==
The word is attested as trute in late Middle High German. The D- from t- represents a typical consonant shift as in Donau.

Dialect forms are Thuringian: trūde; Swabian, Bavarian, Austrian, and Rhenish Franconian: trūd. It is also known in neighboring areas as Danish: drude Also cognate with Swedish Gotlandic: druda, but this word has come to be used in the sense of "harlot".

The term drut apparently occurred in female forms drutin/trutin according to a 17th-century lexicon. In later Bavarian folklore tradition, the female Trude had male counterparts called Truder, Trudner, or Truderer that accompanied the females.

The word trute also came to be used as a generic term for "witch" in the 16th century (Hans Sachs).

== Etymology ==
Middle High German trute is etymologically related to Old Norse troða ("to tread, to trample"), i.e., is related to modern German verb treten ("to tread, to step"); this is considered the most plausible etymology in modern philological opinion.

Grimms' dictionary suggests derivation from MHG trût (modern German traut, meaning "dear, beloved; intimate"), (Note: This etymology was intimated earlier by Schottelius, Justus Georg (1663) [1641], whom Grimm cites. Otto Lyon (1897) considered the etymology plausible, given that "mare" does connect with amorous activity,) but Ranke (1937) regarded it as improbable; (Note: After noting that drude was commonly associated with the word druid without any etymological justification, Grimm asserted that Drude was originally regarded as benevolent like Frau Holle, and Tyrolean legend still regards the Drude as beautiful going on to cite Finn Magnussen (1828) Lex. Mythol.: 971 for the alternative suggestion a relation to the valkyrie's name Þrúðr. This etymology is considered improbable by a number of later commentators) nevertheless, it has also been defended as a possible euphemism, analogous to calling the Erinyes Eumenides or "Gracious ones".

== Folklore ==
Drude is held responsible for causing the nightmare Alpdruck ("elf pressure"), thus considered just a subtype of an Alp, as far as its attack behavior is concerned. According to some folklore, the drude is a witch who can assume various sizes, small or large, thus is able to enter houses as a tiny being (or butterfly, cf. § Parallels below) or grow into a giantess, leaving huge footprints on stone (cf. § Drudenstein). It is also said that only the witch's spirit drifts out of body to perform their handiwork tormenting people (in their sleep).

=== Drudenfuss ===
The Drudenfuss (or Drudenfuß), literally "drude's foot" (also Alpfuss), is the pentagram (⛤) symbol or a hexagram (✡). (Note: With hand-sketched symbols in Grimm's dictionary and Meyer (1903).) (Note: Vernaleken refers to a 7-point (siebeneckige) „Drudenfus".) The symbol is also called Drudenkreuz "drude's cross" or Alpkreuz "alp's cross", Alpfuß "alp's foot"

Drutenfuß is attested in the 17th century, being glossed as omnis incolumitatis symbolum ("symbol of safeguard against all[?]") in Georg Henisch Teütsche Sprach und Weißheit (1616), repeated by Justus Georg Schottelius Teutsche Sprachkunst (aka Teutschen Hauptsprache, 1663, first published 1641). (Note: Rephrased as omnis incolumitatis signum in Grimm in citing Schottelius and Henisch, loc. cit.) Its apotropaic use against the Alpendrück (the "pressure" of the alp, or nightmare demon pinning down the victim's body) is well recorded for 18th- to 19th-century folk belief in Bavaria and Tyrol, while opinion has it the practice may have been ongoing since medieval times.

It has been explained that the symbol is meant to represent the drude's footprint, and originally envisioned as a hexagram (two coinciding equilateral triangles), but later it became conflated with the Pythagorean star-symbol (pentagram), (Note: Pythagorean symbol of ὑγίεια "health".) with the stress the star needs be written in a single stroke.

Also styled Trudenfuß, it is found "painted or applied on house walls, cowshed doors, castle gates, church entrances, and objects such as cradles and bedsteads". (Note: Zika (2021) citing The painter and art historian Schouten (1968) Wörterbuch der deutschen Volkskunde (3rd ed.; Stuttgart: Alfred Kröner Verlag, 1981), pp. 837, 639, as well as the HdA "Trude", Band VIII: 1173–1174, also "Lichtmeß" V:1262, "Pilze" VII: 29, "Traubenkirsche" VIII:1129, "Stall" IX: 587.) At village taverns, the Drudenfusz were hung up like a sign.

A woman needs to place a Trudenfuss charm made of fir wood in the cradle, else, the Trude will press down on the infant and prevent it from screaming (Ötztal). Or the cradle was painted with the Drudenfuß (in combination with various amulets) to ward the infant against the alb (elf or alp), witches, and the drude according to the superstitious practices of German-Czechs in Ober Lomna (Horní Lomná). The custom of putting a painted trottenfusz symbol on the cradle to ward off the schlenz from sucking the life out of the child is recorded in other regions. (Note: Grimm citing Rudolf Zacharias Becker (1788), in turn quoting Wilhelm Denker, who opines there is no such thing as a schlenz.)

The sign protected not just humans, but livestock, so that a Drudenfusz (or a horseshoe) was also placed on stable door to drive away witches and the drude. (Note: Panzer (1848), p. 260 cited by Grimm's dictionary.) The aforementioned Trudenfuss charm (fashioned from fir) should be affixed to the stable door to protect horses (Ötztal).

The general myth in Central Germany regarding the Wild Hunt is that the Wild Huntsman makes prey especially of plant-associated female beings, the Moosweibchen ("moss-wives"), Lohjungfern ("grove-maiden") and Holzfräulein ("wood-maiden"). These female beings can only find sanctuary on those tree stumps where the pious (i.e., the woodcutter, etc., who believed in the blessings of these forest-wives) marked a triple cross. Thus it is also told in the Upper Bohemian Forest region, that he Wild Huntsman seeks especially the Holzweibchen ("wood-wives"), but they can be protected by finding a staff carved with three crosses (or three parallel lines crossed by a diagonal slash), or a pentagram (Drudenfuß).

=== Other expelling tactics ===
One being oppressed by the Drude could grab any object he can get hold of, and this will compel the Truden to beg for the release of the object. Throwing a pillow straightaway at the Trude will repel it (Innsbruck), or pronouncing a Holy name immediately will frighten it away (Absam) Placing a hackle (comb for threshing flax) on the chest, with the spikes pointed upwards, will not only deter a Trude, this should keep it from returning again forever, according to another Tyrolean superstition (Absam and Zirl)

=== Drudenstein ===
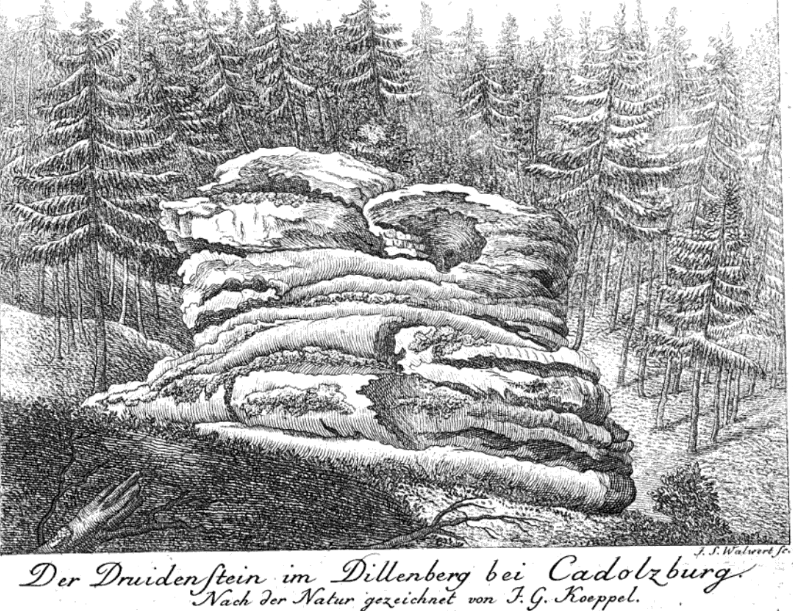
"Druidstein" in Dillenberg near Cadolzburg. —Copperplate by J. G. Koeppel (1816) [1795]

A Drudenstein ("Drude stone") or Trudenstein can have either of two meanings: a landmark, or a stone amulet. In the former sense, folklore in south Germany considers the Trudenstein to be a spot where the female spirits gathered to deliberate upon which human should be selected to be tormented. (Note: Olbrich (1937), n2 citing various sources, incl. Vernaleken (1859) in turn citing Panzer (1848), p. 106 ("129. Der Trudenstein bey Neunburg vorm wald, in der Oberpfalz") and p. 151 ("173.. Dillenberg", vide infra))

One notable example occurs on part of the hill called Dillenberg, at a spot around Stinzendorf (about 3km north of) Langenzenn, Bavaria (cf. image right). Oral tradition insinuates this may have been the site of an old sacrificial altar. (Note: Olbrich (1937), n3 citing Panzer (1855), pp. 151–152 ("173. Der Trutenstein auf dem Dillenberg bey Langenzenn in Mittelfranken").) Local legend asserts the druden attempted to place the stone specifically at the Backenbauer (Beckenbauer) farmstead in Stinzendorf, but had to abandon it short of the goal when the rooster crowed. (Note: A slightly differently told version is given in Reynitzsch (1802) Über truhten, und truhtensteine p. 51 (quoted in Panzer (1855), pp. 151–152): a Truht (or the Devil) attempted to carry the stone to Hesselberg, but dropped it when the inhabitants shouted at it.)

There is also the rock formations in Matscher Tal valley (now part of South Tyrol, Italy) with the supposed drudenfuss footprints impressed upon them.

The other type of Drudenstein used as talismans is a perforated stone, usually a stone smoothened by the riverbed. The mineral composition is not of importance, (Note: Mineral type is dismissed by Olbrich, though Panzer says the Drutensteine is a type of Kalkbildung ("calcareous formation, limestone deposit").) as the holes in the center or the edge of stone identifies the object as magical. (Note: Olbrich (1937), n4 citing Panzer (1855), pp. 428–429) A ribbon or strap is threaded through the hole, and the talisman hung in the living room, by the cradle, or on the window bars of the stable. (Note: Olbrich (1937), n10 citing Panzer (1855), p. 164, No. 268, etc.) as protection against the Trude, witch, nightmare, alp, and schrat. (Note: Olbrich (1937), n7 citing Meyer (1903), pp. 119, 121, etc.)

In Swabia, the stones are otherwise called Schrattensteine or Truttelsteine. (Note: Cf. Meyer (1903), p. 137 on Schratten- or Toggistein.) In the Swiss Jura similar stones are called Krottenstein and Alpfuß. The holed stone is also conceived of as the little people's millstone: the Härdmandli (dwarfs) of the Swiss Jura are supposed to grind corn with it, and in Sweden, the equivalent of the Drudenstein is called Alfquerner ("elf's quern-stone" or "elf-mill").

== Parallels ==
A comparison has been made between the Drudenfuß and Schrattl-Gatterl, described as being "Trudenfuss-like" (trudenfußartige); this Schrattl-Gatterl is an apotropaic "gate" cobbled from wooden slats without using nails (to form a specific symbol, shaped like a combination of "H" and "X"), used for warding against the schrat, or its nightmare-oppression (Schrattdruck, Alpdruck).

The piece of lore that the Trude can assume the guise of a butterfly to sneak into the house (Lower Inn Valley). An unshut window is an open invitation. That a butterfly may be an elf (schrat) in disguise is spoken of elsewhere. (Note: e.g., in parts of Switzerland such as Lucerne, Sette Comuni in Veneto, a Cimbrian-speaking part of Italy, and Swabia.)

Whereas in the Tyrol, women with unusually large eyebrows may be accused of developing into a Trude some day and start pressing on people's chest at night (Inn Valley), Karl Simrock has pointed out that eyebrows grown together is a general shared trait of the schrat, alb, drude, and mare (as well as sorcerers), and people with this shaggy brow trait are stereotyped as being able to send an Alp in the guise of butterflies to afflict people.

== Eponymy and allusion ==
=== In heraldry ===
The Weiler-Rems coat of arms with Drudenfuss device

Drudenfuss is also the German name of the pentagram used as a heraldic device (cf. illustration right). The device may be alternatively referred to as and Alpkreuz "elf-cross" (var. Albenkreuz, Alfenkreuz) or more straightforwardly as Pentalpha or Fünfstern describing its geometry.

=== In literature ===
In Goethe's Faust, Mephistopheles professes to being barred from entry due to a Drudenfuss placed on the threshold.

=== Miscellany ===
Drudenfuss is another name for mistletoe.

== See also ==
- Incubus
- Mare (folklore)
- Succubus
