= Boitatá =

Mythical beast from Brazil

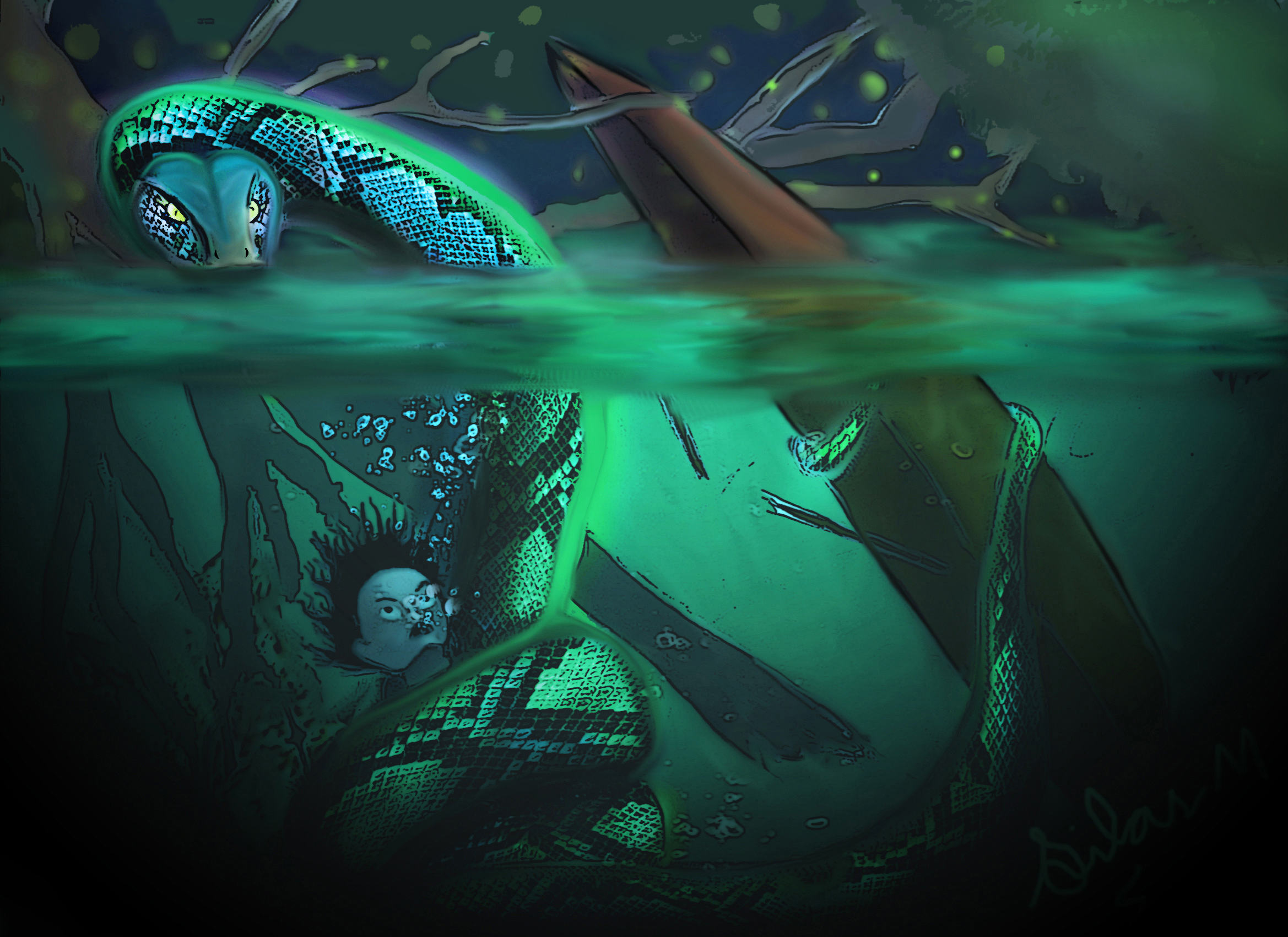
An artistic depiction of Boitatá capturing a hunter

Boitatá (from Tupi language), in Brazilian native folklore, refers to either a will-o'-the-wisp, a mythical fire snake which guards against humans setting fire to the fields or forests, or a bull-like creature.

Snake-like will-o'-the-wisps also appear as "firedrake" in European folklore.

== Nomenclature ==
Boitatá (var. baitatá, batatá) derives from Tupi-Guaraní: mba'e 'thing' or 'agent, cause' + taʼta/tatá 'fire', influenced by mbói 'snake, serpent'.

It is called baitatá or batatá in South-Central Brazil; biatatá in Bahia; batatal in Minas Gerais; and biatatá in São Paulo state and batatão in the Northeast. It is also called Jean de la foice or Jean Delafosse ("John of the sickle") in the states of Sergipe and Alagoas and João Galafuz on Itamaracá.

Thus the term Boitatá, like "João Galafoice" could be a synonym for Fogo-fátuo (will-o'-the-wisp). (Note: Ferreira (1986) Aurélio Dictionary, s.v. "Fogo-fátuo" apud Brandano & Moreira (2003).) However, it could also refer to a mythical fire-serpent, the defender of fields, or forests. Alternatively, it is a mythical bull that shoots fire out of its nostrils.

The term Boitatá is also used as papão, i.e., the Portuguese and Brazilian bogeyman to frighten children into obedience.

== 16th century attestation ==
In a letter dated 31 May 1560, Father José de Anchieta described the apparition as the baetatá (meaning "thing of fire" or "that which is entirely of fire"), dwelling at most times near sea and rivers, encountered especially on beaches. What appears to be a glimmering beam of light coursing towards its victim will attack the Indians, burning and killing them. Such fatality is likened to the handiwork of the curupira. (Note: Father José de Anchieta: "Há também outros (fantasmas), máxime nas praias, que vivem a maior parte do tempo junto do mar e dos rios, e são chamados baetatá, que quer dizer coisa de fogo, o que é o mesmo como se se dissesse o que é todo de fogo. Não se vê outra coisa senão um facho cintilante correndo para ali; acomete rapidamente os índios e mata-os, como os curupiras; o que seja isto, ainda não se sabe com certeza".)

Biologist Hitoshi Nomura comments that: "As that living fire moved while leaving a luminous trail, a sparkling beam came running towards, which the Jesuit noted inspired the image of the serpent's undulating motion".

== General Description ==
The fire snake Boitatá (Mboitatá), according to Magalhães (1876), is one of the being subjected under the moon goddess Jaci, the protectoress of all plants. Mboitátá is the spirit (genio) who guards the fields (campos) against those who sets them on fire (cf. controlled burn, slash-and-burn). The fire-snake sometimes transforms into a fiery log (called méuan) and burns the arsonist to death.

The fire snake Boitatá is similar to the Cobra-Grande, both being terrifying serpents dwelling in or near water.

It has been claimed that the legend of the fire-snake is actually localized in the state of Rio Grande do Sul, with its lore well-documented by writers such as Luiz Carlos Barbosa Lessa and João Simões Lopes Neto. In the Rio Grande do Sul, boitatá is regarded as the protectoress of the fields and forests, with many version introducing her as female a boitatá (where a is the feminine definite article).

Lopes Neto in Lendas do Sul (first published 1913) describes the Boitatá as "sometimes like a black snake, sometimes like a big snake, with bright eyes like two beacons". (Note: "Portuguese: ora como uma cobra preta, ora como uma cobra grande, de olhos luminosos como dois faróis".) (Note: Here for the term faróis (sing. farol), a 19th century gloss of "ship's lantern, beacon-fire" was followed, rather than construing it in the modern sense of an automobile's "headlight" or "traffic light".)

From the Rio Grande do Sul region, an indigenous legend (given by Lopes Neto) tells of a period of endless nights in the forests. Not only did darkness fall, but torrential rains caused great floods. The frightened beasts sought higher elevation for safe haven. A mythological anaconda (boiguaçu) that lived in a dark cave was awakened by the flood, and with the advantage of seeing in the dark, prowled for food. It decided to feast solely on its favorite delicacy: the eyes of other animals. After gorging on the eyes, which lit up inside its body, it turned luminous in its entirety as its body became "clusters of sparkling pupils, a ball of flames, a bright flash, a boitatá, a fire snake". But the meager diet left the anaconda weakened, and it died. But it reincarnated into a snake "with eyes like two beacons, transparent hide, that sparkled in the night when it appears slithering through the fields and along the riverbanks". A human encountering it in the fields were subject to blindness, madness, or death. To ward it off, it was believed a man had to remain still without breathing, keeping his eyes tightly closed. Fleeing was risky, since the snake might suspect the man of being an arson who has set fire to the woods.

=== Santa Catarina bull creature ===
The boitáta of Santa Catarina, described by journalist and writer Crispim Mira, inferred to be in the form of a bull, is "as large as a bull, with paws like those of giants and with an enormous eye right in the middle of his forehead, shining like a firebrand. No one knows its lair, or what it feeds on. In truth, it fares out to sea like a seahorse, or sometimes flies over trees like some fantastic infernal bird". (Note: Mira, Crispim (1920). Terra Catarinense:"grande como um touro, etc..", quoted in Leite, Ligia Chiappini Moraes No entretanto dos tempos: literatura e história em João Simões Lopes Neto, Martins Fontes, 1988, pp. 165, 168, also quoted in Blayer & Anderson (2004), p. 204.) As pointed out by Amadeu Amaral (d. 1929, published 1948), the Tupi stem mbói for "snake" was easily confused with Portuguese boi for "ox", hence the shift in the lore from the indigenous original. (Note: Amaral (1948), quoted by Blayer & Anderson (2004), p. 204) The artwork of local folklorist Franklin Cascaes has created some 30 pieces of iconography on the boitáta theme, with examples featuring a horned bovine head, body of a bull or cow, as well as wings and bipedalism (standing erect on two legs). (Note: As self-evident from fig. 2, 3, 4, 5 on pp. 13–14. The artist's notes on these mainly concern the landscape background, and so does the paper's commentary. The paper discusses physical features of a Tavau cow-goddess derived from boitáta, Fig. 7, p. 18, and the dragon-like Boitatá Franculino, Fig. 11, at p. 30.)

== Modern retellings ==
In Manuel Filho's children's story Quem Tem Medo do Boitatá? ("Who's Afraid of the Boitatá?", 2007) the protagonist's grandfather Sandrinho is blinded by the Boitatá itself.

José Santos's O casamento do Boitatá com a Mula-sem-cabeça ("The Wedding of the Boitatá with the Headless Mule", 2007) combines several beings from Brazilian folklore, like the Headless Mule (Mula sem cabeça).

Marco Haurélio's A lenda do Batatão ("The Legend of Batatão", 2012) written in sextilha strophes, features a "Batatão" which preserves the fiery characteristic of the boitatá, but is similar to the tormented soul.

In Alexandra Pericão's anthology Uaná and other legends (2011), the snake, also an eye-eater, is described in very contemporary fashion, with amusing quotes, such as "no one... has managed to put a photo of it on the internet. Despite its gigantic size, the snake is so discreet that only those it captures can see it".

== See also ==
- Brazilian mythology
- Guarani mythology
- Tupi people
- Animism
- slash-and-burn
- Caipora – Entity in Brazil mythology
- Curupira – Mythological creature in Tupi–Guarani folklore

== Bibliography ==
- Blayer, Irene Maria; Anderson, Mark Cronlund (2004). Latin American Narratives and Cultural Identity: Selected Readings. P. Lang. ISBN 9780820463209.
- Cascudo, Luís da Câmara (1962) [1954]. Dicionário do folclore brasileiro (in Portuguese). Vol. 1 (2 ed.). Rio de Janeiro: Instituto Nacional do Livro.
- Couto de Magalhães, José Vieira (1876). O selvagem. Vol. II: Origens, costumes e Região Selvagem. Rio de Janeiro: Typogr. da reforma.
