= Gulleråsen =

- Location within Dalarna Location within Sweden
- Coordinates: 61°04′N 15°11′E
- Country: Sweden
- Province: Dalarna
- County: Dalarna County
- Municipality: Rättvik Municipality

Area
  - Total: 1.87 km^{2} (0.72 sq mi)

Population (31 December 2010)
  - Total: 333
  - Density: 178/km^{2} (460/sq mi)
- Time zone: UTC+1 (CET)
  - Summer (DST): UTC+2 (CEST)

Gulleråsen is a locality situated in Rättvik Municipality, Dalarna County, Sweden with 333 inhabitants in 2010.
