= Zburător =

Supernatural being in Romanian folklore

Zburător or sburător (Romanian word meaning 'flyer') is a supernatural being in Romanian folklore, described as a "roving spirit who makes love to maidens by night".

== General description ==
The zburător is also likened to an incubus, and described as a malevolent demon active in a "oniric-erotic" manner, i.e., visiting women in their dreams in the guise of a handsome young man. They are otherwise referred to as a zmeu (another dragon-like creature) in some regions, though perhaps perceived to have more human-like aspects than the zmeu.

A zburător may also be a specific form that a zmeu can take. One story tells of a woman married to a man she did not love. Each night a zmeu "in the form of a zburător" visits and the woman disappears with it, reappearing later.

== History of lore ==
Dimitrie Cantemir, writing about the myth concerning it in Descriptio Moldaviae (1714–1716), (Note: Pascu, Giorge tr. (1935), Descrierea Moldovei into Romanian.) stated that the "zburator" meant "flyer" (Latin: volatilis), and according to the beliefs of the Moldavan it was "a ghost, a young, handsome man who comes in the middle of the night at women, especially recently married ones and does indecent things with them, although he cannot be seen by other people, not even by the ones who waylay him".

A literary reworking of the myth later appeared in the romantic poem by Ion Heliade Rădulescu Zburătorul ('The Flyer/Flying Incubus', 1843), and the "incubus" with flowing black hair visiting a young girl and inducing her erotic awakening. (Note: This likely inspired the vampire novel by Bram Stoker, according to Cazacu.) The myth reappears in the late romantic literature, in poems such as Călin (file de poveste) (Călin (story pages)) and Luceafărul (The Evening Star) (1884) by Romanian poet Mihai Eminescu.

The zburător (sburător) myth became one of the four fundamental myths in Romanian folk poetry according to the framework of George Călinescu (1941). (Note: The other three being the Trajan and Dochia myth, the mytho of Miorița (The Ewe Lamb), and the myth of Meşterul Manole.)

== See also ==
- Firedrake (folklore) – Shooting stars and will-o-wisps thought to be fiery dragons in European folklore
