= Franklin Cascaes =

Brazilian researcher, folklorist, ceramist, anthropologist, engraver and writer

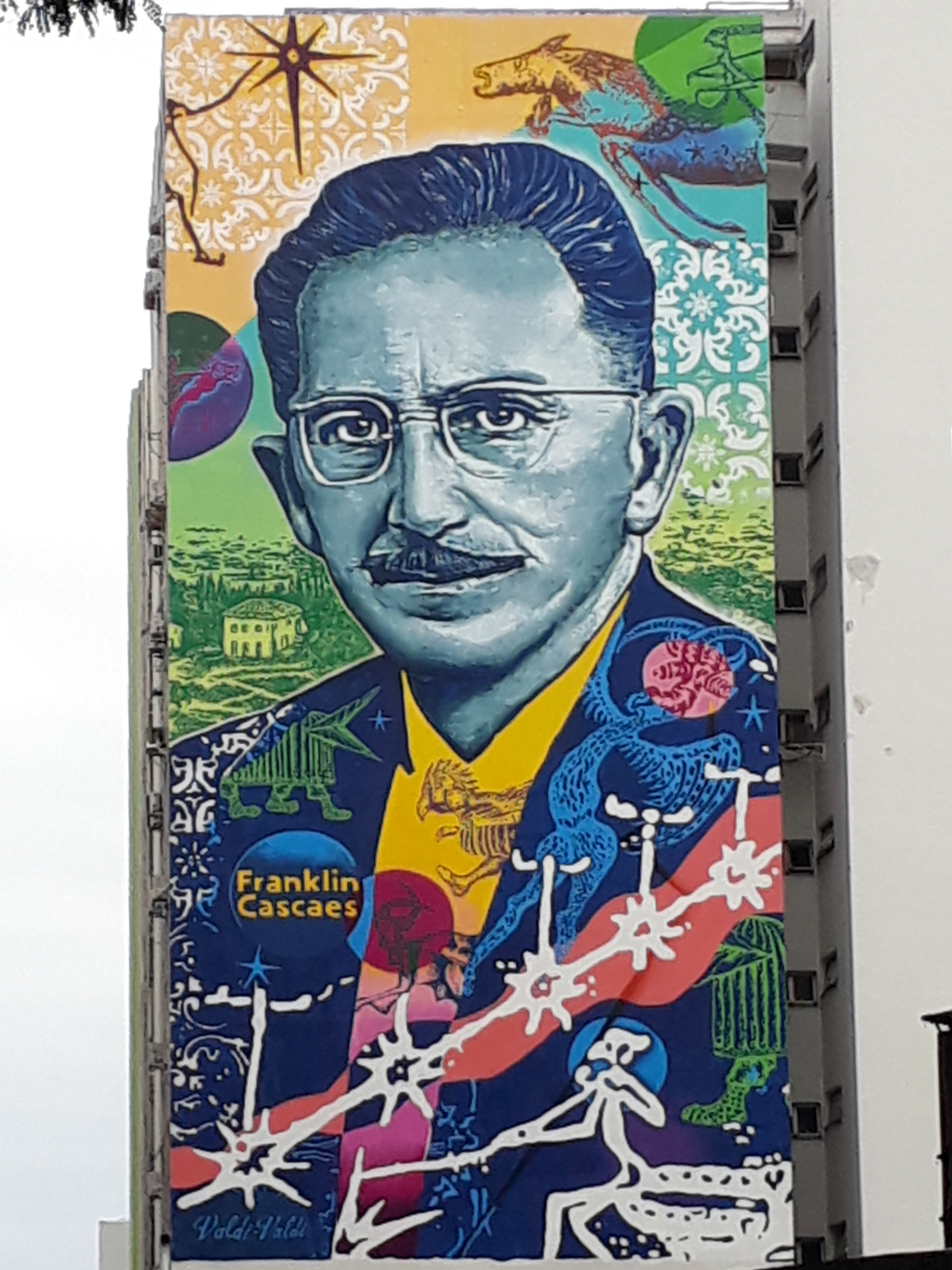
- Street art of Franklin Cascaes in Florianópolis
- Born: October 16, 1908; São José, Brazil
- Died: March 15, 1983 (aged 74); Florianópolis, Brazil

Academic work
- Discipline: Folklorist/anthropologist
- Sub-discipline: Specialist of Azorean culture

Franklin Joaquim Cascaes (October 16, 1908 in São José – March 15, 1983 in Florianópolis) was a Brazilian researcher of the Azorean culture, folklorist, ceramist, anthropologist, engraver and writer. Cascaes was born on the beach of Itaguaçu, São José, today in the mainland of Florianópolis.

== Biography ==
He dedicated his life to the study of the Azorean culture in the Santa Catarina Island and region, including folkloric, cultural aspects, their legends and superstitions. He used a phonetic language to portray the speech of the people in daily life.

His work only became known in 1974, when he was 66 years old.

In the year 1983, a collection called "Elizabeth Pavan Cascaes Teacher Collection", which is still in the documentation phase, was created, with donations by the author himself containing his artistic works. Today, the collection is under the custody of the Federal University of Santa Catarina, which does a good job in preserving the fragile collection of the master. There are approximately 3,000 pieces in ceramics, wood, basketwork and plaster; 400 engravings in ink; 400 pencil drawings and a large set of writings that include legends, short stories, chronicles and letters, all of the results of Franklin Cascaes' 30 years of work with the island population, collecting testimonies, stories and mystical stories about witches, Azorean cultural heritage.

In 2008, on the centenary of his birth, the researcher was honored with the book Thirteen Cascaes, a collection of thirteen short stories by different authors, who recreated a story about the stories of Franklin Cascaes. The book is dedicated to rescuing the Azorean culture of the region of Florianópolis.
