= Firedrake (folklore) =

Shooting stars and will-o-wisps thought to be fiery dragons in European folklore

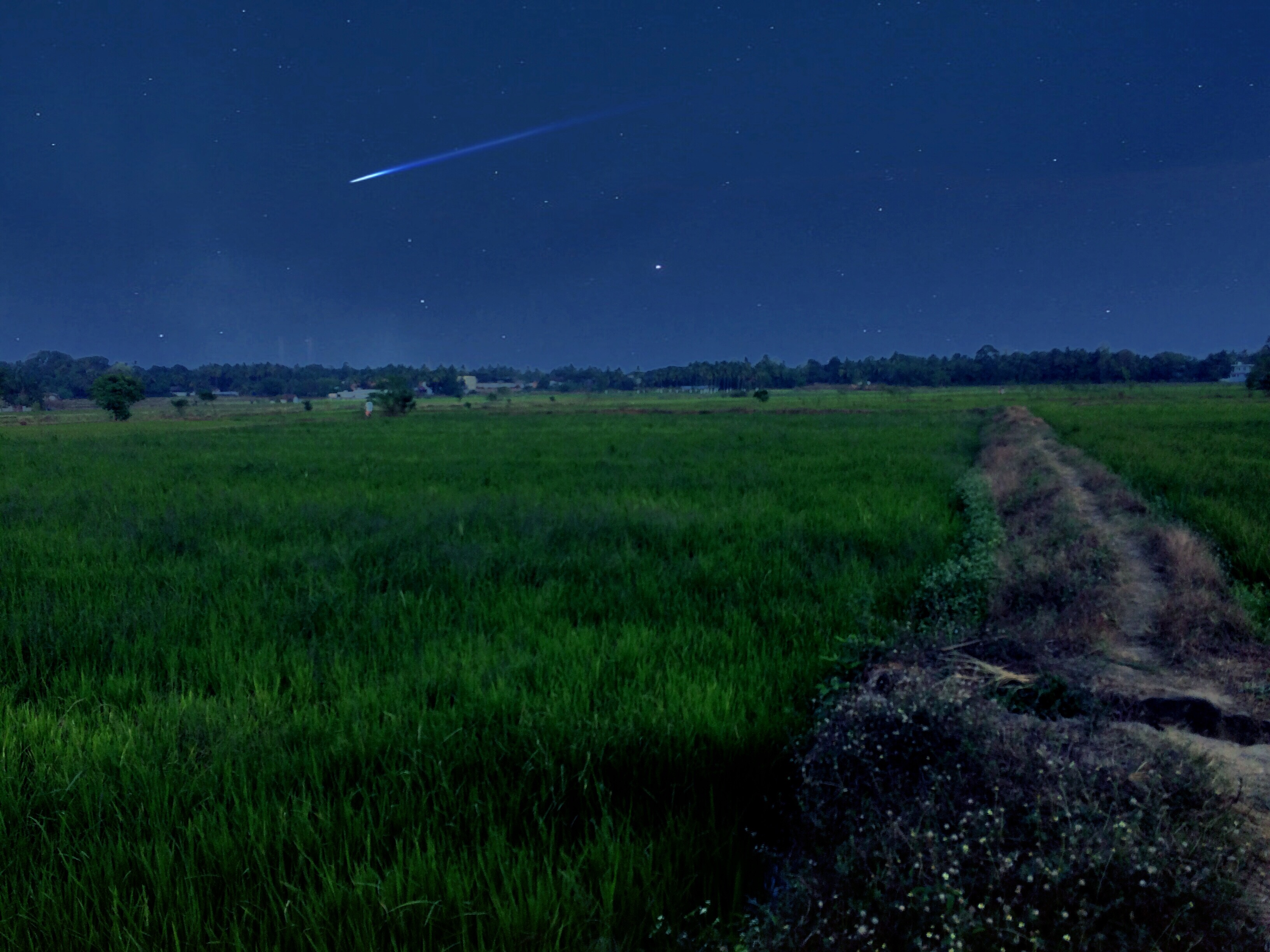
Firedrakess are said to appear as sparking streaks of light flying across the sky akin to shooting stars or will-o'-the-wisps

Firedrakes (also spelled fire-drake; cf. Swedish: eldsdrake, "fiery dragon"; Russian: ognennyi zmei, Ukrainian: vohnyanyy zmiy, "fiery serpent"), among other names, is a European type of dragon stemming from sightings of shooting star and will-o'-the-wisp phenomenons, said to appear as sparking streaks of fire in the sky. Such are primarily evil beings, more than often shapeshifted demons or spirits.

== Appearance ==
In East Slavic tradition, the "fiery serpent" is said to generally resemble a fiery shaft (Russian: коромысло, "fiery carrying pole"), a flaming broom, or a glowing ball of blue fire, releasing sparks during its flight.

In Swedish folklore, the flogdrake ("flying dragon") has been given the analogy of a fiery steelyard balance, firebroom, or flaming sheaf of straw. It lacks any visible limbs to wings, and is said to appear in the evening sky surrounded by sparks, looking like a golden stripe that sweeps across the sky.

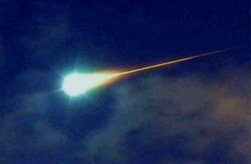
a flying bolide meteor

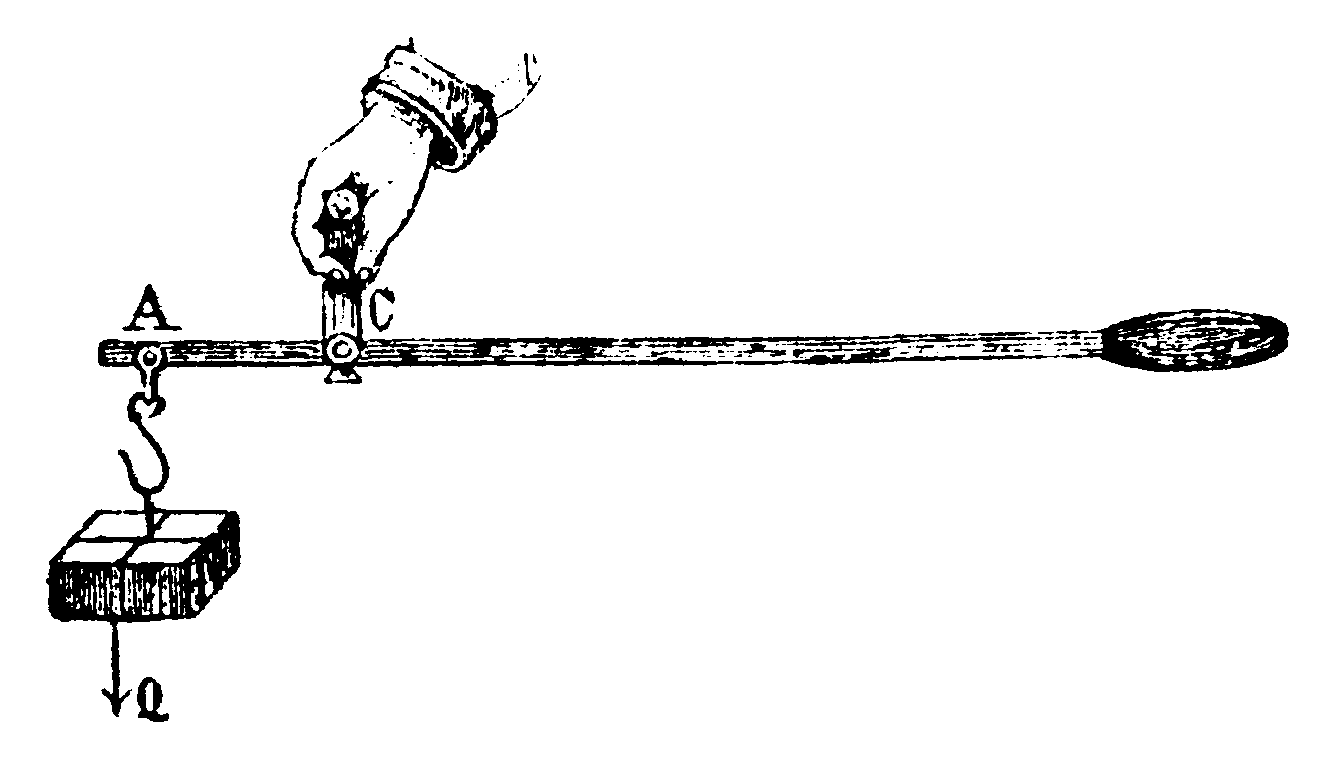
old Swedish steelyard balance

== The origin of the image ==
The firedrake beliefs stems from inexplicable sightings of shooting stars, bolides, and comets, seen as streaks of light flying across the sky, and sometimes crashing and boring into the ground. The association with dragons is not unique to Slavic folklore, and appears variously across Europe to some extent. Similar being also appear in other parts of the world – cf. Boitatá.

=== Eastern myth ===
The origin of the Slavic myth is unknown, and the "fiery serpent" appears across the pan-Slavic world. The folklore mirrors various European folklore regarding demons and spirits (gnomes, wights, etc) shapeshifting into dragons (serpents) in order to protect and gather treasure, a motif seen in famous stories such as the Völsunga saga, and also connecting to the myth of "that which lies under a serpent grows with it", ie, dragons broods treasure to get richer. Other gnome traditions also carry over, such as the egg-lore of the Schrat etc (see § Egg lore).

According to Russian folk belief (around Tula), when the archangel Michael cast down the fallen angels, some of these devils evaded falling down to earth, and remained flying in the atmosphere in the form of fiery serpents. (Note: Kolchin (1899), cited and given in English by Ivanits.)

=== Western myth ===
As opposed to Slavic myth, where the fiery serpent is a unique folklorean entity, in western myth, firedrakes are rather ambiguous with dragons, shooting stars, and will-o'-the-wisps, in general.

Even in Sweden, where the firedrake is more defined (see flogdrake), descriptions are sometimes generic, simply referring to it as "the dragon". Swedish archivist Carl-Martin Bergstrand wrote in 1947 the following in his book about Bohuslän legends:

The old talk about the dragon. He came like a firebroom, it was as if someone had set fire to a sheaf of straw. He flew high in the air. Most people thought it was the devil, but some said that it couldn't be, because he wouldn't be let loose until the end of time. Then there were some who thought it would be the Last Judgment when they saw a dragon.

Per the above, such phenomena have also been associated with the devil etc.

== English folklore ==
In English, the term is firedrake (fire-drake; Old English: fyrdraca), ambiguous with "fiery dragon" and "fiery meteor", as well as will-o'-the-wisp.

English firedrakes are quite obscure; the lexicographer James Murray wrote for the former the following definition in volume 5 of the Oxford English Dictionary (1901), but does not elaborate further:

A 'fiery dragon'; a mythical creature belonging to Germanic superstition.

Such have been thought to be the Devil himself, and have been used as a kenning or noa-name for Satan or other personification of evil and deceit, etc.

== Slavic folklore ==
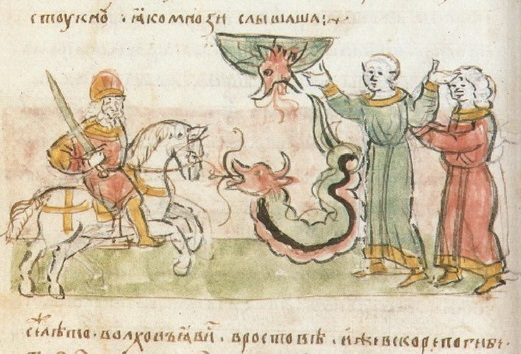
A firedrake (meteorite) that fell from the sky in 1091 during Vsevolod Yaroslavich's hunt near Vyshgorod ― Radziwiłł Chronicle

Demons took on various shapes, and the "fiery serpent" of the East and West Slavs, as well as the "flying serpent" of the Southern Slavs appeared as serpents in air, and as humans on ground. It releases sparks during its flight and enters the (women's) house through the chimney.

The evil spirit reputedly visits the woman at night-time. Women who were widowed, or separated from her husband was particularly vulnerable to having affairs with this certain type of devil, because the devil will assume the shape of the dead or absentee husband. In their grief, and their desperation to be rejoined with their lost love, women do not recognize the serpent and become convinced that their lover has returned. It is told that those who are visited by the serpent experience weight loss, exhibit signs of insanity and eventually commit suicide, or wither and die. In addition, victims of the serpent often experience hallucinations, including visions of supernatural torment, such as suckling on breasts which excrete blood rather than milk.

The serpent may bring gifts, but those gifts turn to horse manure at sunrise (Russian, west-Ukrainian). (Note: e.g. tale from Pereslavl-Zalessky. The woman was eating what she thought were treats brought by her dead husband, but they were nothing but sheep and horse dung to others who saw the "treats" in daylight.)

Mythology also tells that the fiery serpent had a son by a human woman, and she bore a werewolf (оборотень), the "Fiery Serpent Wolf" (Zmei Ognennyi Volk; Змей Огненный Волк). Thus women can have the fiery serpent's children, and illegitimate births are still often explained as such devil spawn. If a woman conceives a child with such a devil, the pregnancy will be exceedingly long, and the child will be born with black skin, with hooves instead of feet, eyes without eyelids and a cold body (Russia), or its body will be cold and jelly-like (East Ukraine). Such births are not viable, and the children die.

== Swedish folklore ==
The Swedish version is historically called flogdrake (Old Swedish: floghdraki, "fly-dragon"), elddrake ("fire dragon") or eldsdrake ("fiery dragon"). Whether mythologically related to the Slavic tradition, it stems from seeing light phenomenons in the sky. It is a wingless worm-dragon that flies across the sky while glowing, looking like a streak of fire or light akin to a shooting star, living in mountain tunnels that it drills, called drakarör ("dragon tubes").

Some interpret the fire streak phenomenon as the dragon "firing over his possessions" or "illuminating his goods", and thus pointing out where the treasure or dragon's nest is to be found. Other interpret the fire streak as the dragon itself.

== Baltic folklore ==
=== Estonian folklore ===
The Estonian kratt (Estonian Swedish: skrat) can manifest itself as a fiery being with a sparking tail, which in some variants is a dragon analog to the firedrake of Swedish folklore: flogdrake, intended as a mean to guard and transport their treasures. The Swedish flogdrake was likewise thought to transport treasure it had stolen. The kratt is also related to the Swedish folklore of Nordic gnomes and wights, which also are said to transform themselves into dragons and thereof to both guard and transport their treasures. The same motif is also found in the related Northern German Schrat (Low German: puk, Estonian: puuk), which likewise can transform into a dragon to handle treasure and thereof.

Some commentators also see some parallel to the Belarusian flying serpent, however, the Estonian version fails to act as an ardent lover to a human woman.

=== Lithuanian folklore ===
Some commentators see some parallel between the Belarus flying serpent, etc., with the Lithuanian aitvaras, which also brings riches, love to be fed egg dishes, and retributes using fire. But similar lore may be widespread simply due to the pan-European mythology of basilisks disseminated during medieval times, or perhaps somewhat later in the 16th century.

== Names ==
| Country | Name | Etymology |
|---|---|---|
| (Belarus) Belarusian | lietučij zmiej (летучий змей) | "flying serpent" |
| (United Kingdom) English | firedrake, fire-drake | from Old English: fyrdraca, "fiery dragon" |
| (United Kingdom) English | flying dragon | rare form; cf. Swedish: flogdrake, Polish: latawiec, Russian: летучий, летун, Ukrainian: літа́вець |
| (Poland) Polish | latawiec | "the flying one", associated with the wind |
| (Russia) Russian | ognennyi zmei (огненный змей) | "fiery serpent" |
| (Russia) Russian | zmei ognennyi (змей огненный) | "serpent of fire" |
| (Russia) Russian | zmei-lyubak (змей-любак) | "serpent-lyubak" |
| (Russia) Russian | chobanets (хованец) | cf. Ukrainian: хованец (khovanets), вихованець (vykhovanets), "pupil, fosterling, nurseling", a Ukrainian house-spirit born from eggs |
| (Russia) Russian | nalotnik (налётник) | "raider", cf. Ukrainian: налі́тник |
| (Russia) Russian | nalot (налёт) | "raid", cf. Ukrainian: налі́т |
| (Russia) Russian | letun (летун) | "flyer", cf. Ukrainian: літу́н |
| (Russia) Russian | letuchiy (летучий) | "flying one" |
| (Russia) Russian | litavets (литавец) | "flying one", same form as Ukrainian: літа́вець, found in southern Russia |
| (Russia) Russian | man'yak (маньяк) | "beckoner", from "манить, manítʹ, "to beckon" |
| (Russia) Russian | prelestnik (прелестник) | "charmer" |
| (Serbia) Serbian | ognyanik (огнаник) | "fiery one", in the Serbian epic ballads |
| (Serbia) Serbian | zmaj ognjeni (змај огњени) | "fiery dragon", in the Serbian epic ballads |
| (Sweden) Swedish | flogdrake | "fly-dragon" (archaic form of flygdrake), from Old Swedish floghdraki, flughdraki, a literary loan from Old West Norse flugdreki ("flying dragon"). |
| (Sweden) Swedish | elddrake | "fire dragon" |
| (Sweden) Swedish | eldsdrake | "fiery dragon" |
| (Ukraine) Ukrainian | perelesnyk (перелесник) | "tempter, seducer" |
| (Ukraine) Ukrainian | perevésnyk (переве́сник) | "tempter, seducer" reconstructed ancestral form *per-lьstьnik'ъ |
| (Ukraine) Ukrainian | pervonach (первонач) | "tempter, seducer" |
| (Ukraine) Ukrainian | litávetsʹ літа́вець) | "flying one", also in southern Russian: литавец |
| (Ukraine) Ukrainian | litún (літу́н) | "flyer", cf. Russian: летун |
| (Ukraine) Ukrainian | nalít (налі́т) | "raid", cf. Russian: налёт |
| (Ukraine) Ukrainian | nalítnyk (налі́тник) | "raider", cf. Russian: налётник |
| (Ukraine) Ukrainian | vohnyanyy zmiy (вогняний змій) | "fire serpent", Ukrainian term for the pan-Slavic "fiery serpent" |

== See also ==
- Aitvaras – Nature spirit in Lithuanian mythology
- Drak (mythology) – Infernal familiar and domestic sprite from German folklore
- Chuvash dragon – Legendary winged fire-breathing and shape-shifting creature in Chuvash legends
- Incubus – Mythological demon that seduces women
- Mavka – Female spirit in Ukrainian mythology
- Wawel Dragon – Creature in Polish folklore
- Zburător – Supernatural being in Romanian folklore
- Zmei (Russian) – Dragon or serpent in Russian mythology
- Flogdrake – similar myth in Sweden
