= Noa-name =

Word used instead of a taboo or dangerous word

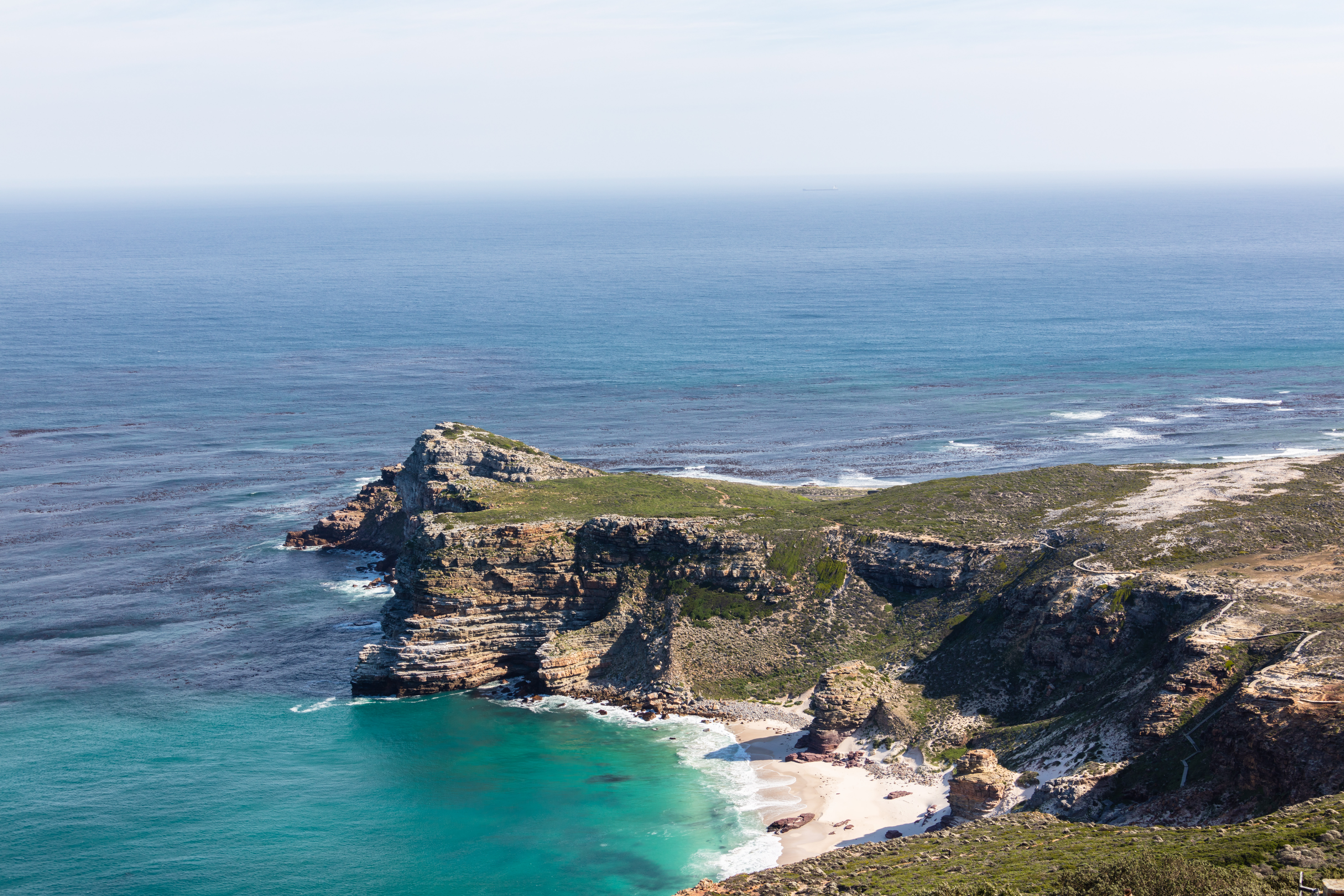
Portuguese mariner Bartolomeu Dias named the Cabo das Tormentas ("cape of the storms") in southern Africa but the king John II of Portugal renamed it Cabo de Boa Esperança ("cape of good hope").

A noa-name is a word that replaces a taboo word, generally out of fear that the true name would anger or summon the force or being in question. The term derives from the Polynesian concept of Noa, which is the antonym of Tapu (from which derives the word taboo) and serves to lift the tapu from a person or object.

A noa-name is sometimes described as a euphemism, though the meaning is more specific; a noa-name is a non-taboo synonym used to avoid bad luck, and replaces a name considered dangerous. The noa-name may be innocuous or flattering, or it may be more accusatory.

== Examples ==
- In the Germanic languages, the word for 'bear' was replaced with a noa-name meaning 'brown', the Proto-Germanic *berô, with descendants including Swedish björn, English bear and bruin, German Bär and Dutch beer.
- In Finnish, there are several noa-names for karhu (bear), used instead of calling the animal by its name and inadvertently attracting its attention. The word karhu itself is a noa-name, to avoid using the original (and now relatively uncommon) words otso or ohto. (See Finnish mythology.)
- In Swedish, the word ulv ('wolf') was replaced by varg ('stranger'). The spirits of the hearth, tomte (corresponding to the Scottish brownie, or the Cornish pixie), were known as nisse, 'dear little relatives'.
- In Irish folklore, fairies more commonly called sidhe are referred to as 'the little people' or 'the good people.'
- The Icelandic word huldufólk translates to 'the hidden people' and refers to supernatural beings otherwise known as álfar (elves).
- In English, the Devil has been referred to by a variety of names (e.g. 'Old Nick', 'Mr. Scratch') to avoid attracting his attention through his name.
- In Greek legend, the Erinyes (the Furies, the spirits of revenge) were commonly known as the Eumenides ('the benevolent ones'). Additionally, Hades, god of the underworld, was usually referred to with euphemisms like Ploútōn ('the wealthy one') in order to avoid attracting his attention.
- In Romanian, the Devil is referred to by such names as necuratul ('the unclean one'), ucigă-l crucea/toaca ('may the cross/church board kill him'), Scaraoţki or Sărsăilă to avoid invoking him by his name of 'dracul'.
- Thou shalt not take the name of the Lord thy God in vain is one of the Ten Commandments in Abrahamic religion.
  - The Lord is therefore used instead by Anglophone Christians, analogous to terms like the Latin Dominus
  - In Jewish culture, it is forbidden to speak the name of God (represented as YHWH) and the noa-name adonai, 'my lord', or HaShem, 'the Name', is used instead.
- To avoid the negative connotations of the left side and left-handedness, most Romance languages borrowed or adopted noa-names to avoid Latin sinister: see French gauche, Spanish izquierdo, Romanian stângă. Also Greek created ἀριστερός (aristeros), a derivation from ἄριστος (aristos, "best") to avoid λαιός (laios).
- In Poland, superstitious people from older generations substitute the word for cancer, "rak" with the euphemism "Ten, co do tyłu chodzi" ("The one who walks backwards").

== See also ==
- Apotropaic names are negative words applied to ward off evil.
- Avoidance speech, a sociolinguistic phenomenon found in some aboriginal languages
- Heiti, synonyms used in Old Norse poetry in place of the normal words
- Kenning, figuratively-phrased compound terms used in place of a simple single-word noun
- The love that dare not speak its name
- Mokita, a Trobriand term that translates as 'the truth we all know but agree not to talk about'
- The evil wizard Lord Voldemort, typically referred to in the Harry Potter series as "He Who Must Not Be Named" or "You-Know-Who"
- The name of the William Shakespeare play Macbeth is, by longstanding theatrical custom, not to be mentioned in order to avoid bad luck; reference is instead made, for instance, to "the Scottish play"
