= Aitvaras =

Nature spirit in Lithuanian mythology

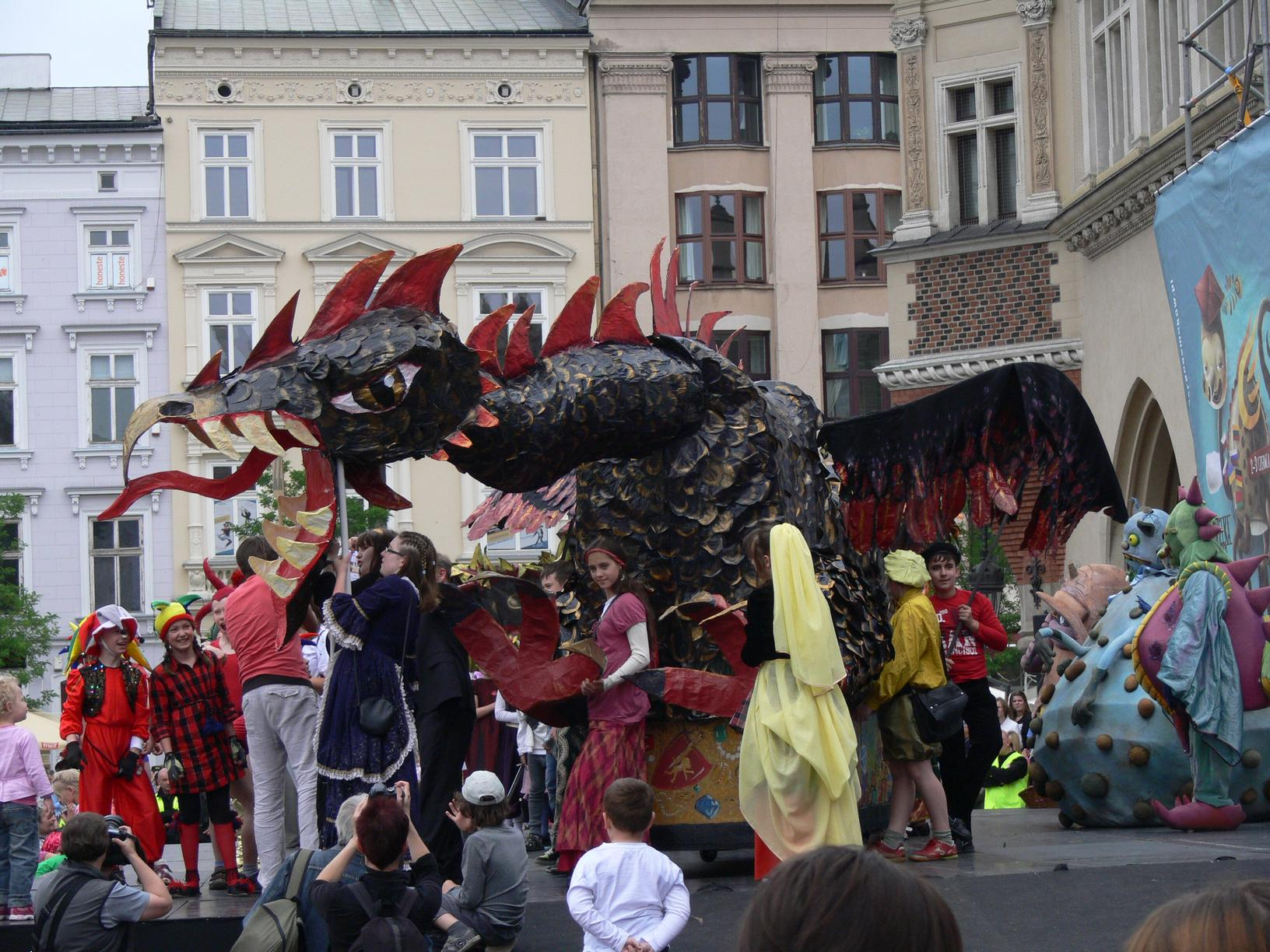
Aitvaras costume in the Parade of Dragons in Kraków in 2012

Aitvaras is a nature spirit in Lithuanian mythology. It is also known by other names, such as Atvaras, Damavykas, Pūkis, Sparyžius, Koklikas, Gausinėlis, Žaltvikšas, and Spirukas, and is identical to the Latvian Pūķis. An Aitvaras looks like a white or black rooster with a fiery tail like a meteor. An Aitvaras is said to hatch from an egg of a 9- to 15-year-old rooster. If an Aitvaras dies, it becomes a spark.

In many cases, this Lithuanian creature is described as a bird with the appearance of a dragon outdoors. An Aitvaras will lodge itself in a house and most often refuse to leave. It brings both good and bad luck to the inhabitants of the house, providing its adopted home with stolen gold and grain, often getting the household into trouble.

== See also ==
- Ajatar
- Cockatrice
