= Schrat =

Sprite from German, Ashkenazi Jewish, Slavic, and Northern European folklore

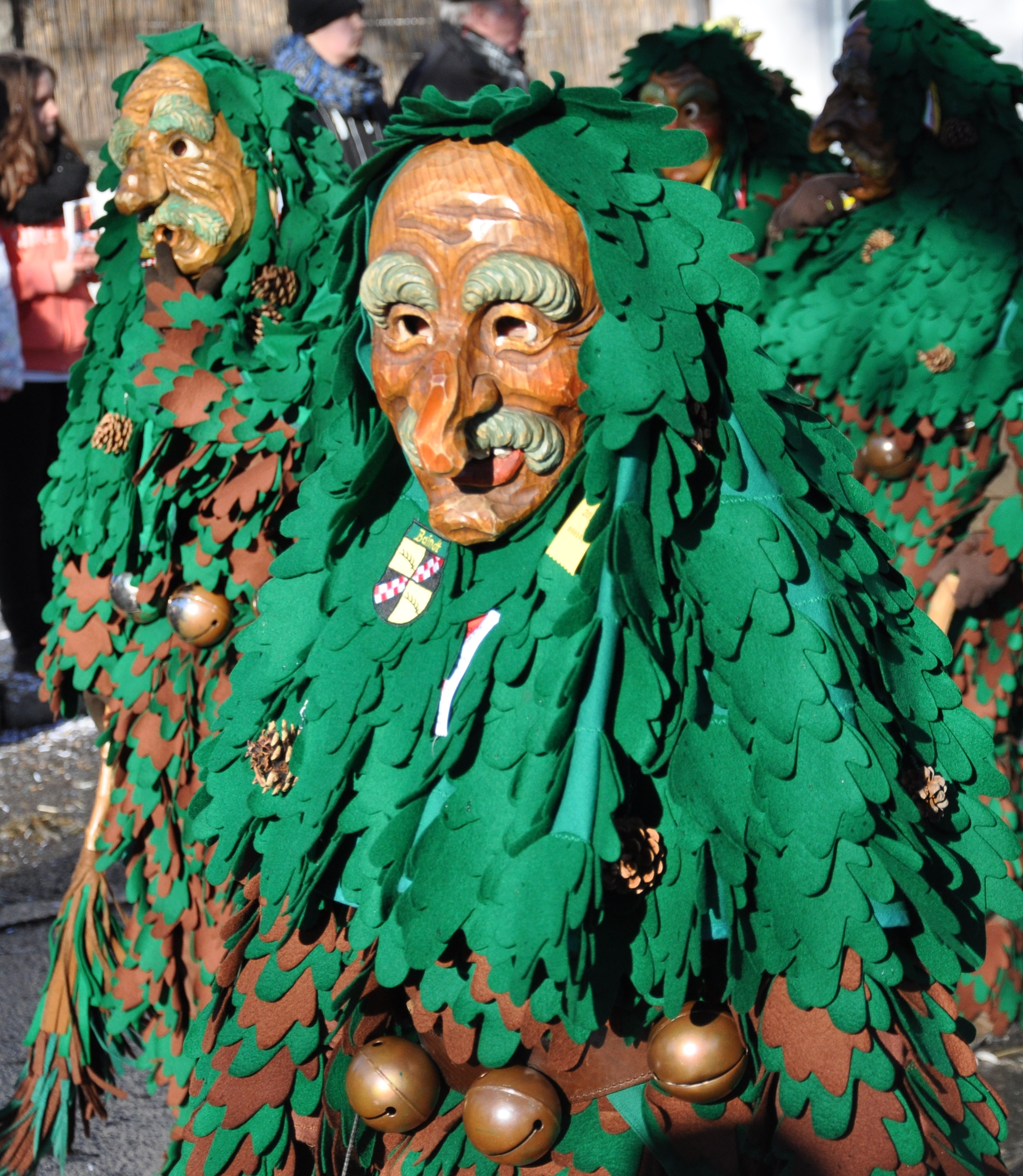
Schrat as Carnival costume.

The Schrat (German: [ʃʁaːt]) or Schratt, also Schraz or Waldschrat (forest Schrat), is a rather diverse German and Slavic legendary creature with aspects of either a wood sprite, domestic sprite and/or a nightmare demon. In other languages it is further known as Skrat.

== Etymology ==
The word Schrat originates in the same word root as Old Norse skrati, skratti (sorcerer, giant), Icelandic skratti (devil) and vatnskratti (water sprite), Swedish skratte (fool, sorcerer, devil), and English scrat (devil).

The German term entered Slavic languages and (via North Germanic languages) Finno-Ugric ones as well. Examples are Polish skrzat, skrzot (domestic sprite, dwarf), (Note: Polish variant krzat is recorded in the 15th century, i.e., an early initial dropped shift (apheresis) form.) Czech škrat, škrátek, škrítek (domestic sprite, gold bringing devil/mining sprite (Note: Ranke in HdA cites two sources: Grimm DM which gives Czech skřet, skřjtek glossed as penas in some lexicon, and Brückner's Polish dictionary.) (Note: Ranke's entry for "Schrat" contends that the Czech forms mean "Gold bringender Teufel", but this is not explicit in the cited two sources. Brückner gives Czech skrátek, szkrzítek as "hag, baba" (jędzy) or "mine spirit" (duchu-górniku).)), Slovene škrat, škratek, škratelj (domestic sprite, mining sprite), and škratec (corn or gold-bringing being, whirlwind, Polish plait) as well as Estonian kratt, krätt, rett, krat, krätt (domestic sprite, "treasure/wealth-bringer", comparable to Schratt).

== Medieval attestations ==
The Schrat is first attested in Medieval sources. Old High German sources have scrato, scrat, scraz, scraaz, skrez,screiz, waltscrate (walt = forest), screzzolscratto, sklezzo, slezzo, and sletto (pl. scrazza, screzza, screza, waltscraze, waltsraze).

Middle High German sources give the forms schrat, schrate, waltschrate, waltschrat, schretel, schretelîn, schretlin, schretlein, schraz, schrawaz, schreczl, schreczlein, schreczlîn or schreczlin, and waltscherekken (forest terror; also the pl. schletzen).

In Old High German sources, the word is used to translate the Latin terms referring to wood sprites and nightmare demons, such as pilosi (hairy sprites), fauni (fauns), satiri, (satyrs), silvestres homines (forest humans), incubus, incubator, and larva (spirit of the dead). Accordingly, the earliest known Schrat was likely a furry or hairy fiend or an anthropomorphic or theriomorphic spirit dwelling in the woods and causing nightmares.

Middle High German sources continued to translate satyrus and incubus as Schrat, indicating it was considered a wood sprite or nightmare demon, but another vocabularium glossed Schrat as penates (domestic sprite).

The Middle High German story "Schrätel und Wasserbär (polar bear)" (13th cent.), where the spirit haunts a peasant's house in Denmark is considered "genuine" house spirit (kobold) material.

The medieval tradition of offering the schretlein or trut (i.e. Trud) pairs of little red shoes was preached as sin by Martin von Amberg (c. 1350–1400). (Note: von der Hagen (1937). The HdA article on "Schuh" cites ZfVK 4:292, n2, which requotes from Rochholz which in turn cites von der Hagen.)

== Diminutive forms ==
The Schrat is known by numerous diminutive forms, many of which take on the sense of Alp, a nightmare demon. That is to say, many of these carry the sense of an Alptraum (oppressive dream, nightmare) demon or sickness demon especially in the south (Cf. § Nightmare demon). But Schrat diminutives may also refer to a house spirit (kobold, cf. § Domestic sprite) or a stable-haunting being (that haunt stables and homes, shearing manes, braiding elflocks, and suckling on livestock and human mothers).

The diminutive form Schrätel, for example, is ambivalent, and is discussed below under both a "dream demon" and "household sprite." (Note: Ranke's form "Schrät(t)ele" ("Schrat" in HdA), citations under note 8) actually begins with instances of "Schrätel" (ZfVk 8, ZfVk23), "Schrättel" (Stoeber, Elsass. Volksbüchl.). The fourth source (Hertz Elsaß) gives "Schrettele" as a Koboldnamen in Swabia, where schrettele is described as a dream demon in Swabian sources. The Alsatian sources attest to "Schrätzmännel".)

To name other such forms, unsorted into specific spirit types: Schrätlein, Schrättlein; Schrättling; Schrötele, Schröttele, Schröttlich, Schreitel; Schrätzlein; and Schlaarzla, Schrähelein.

== Wood sprite ==
The Waldschrat is a solitary wood sprite looking scraggily, shaggily, partially like an animal, with eyebrows grown together, and wolf teeth in its mouth., as summarized by Hans Pehl in the HdA.

But this is a hotchpotch profile put together from disparate sources. (Note: Pehl, n50) cites Grimm 396; Simrock Myth. 439; Lütolf Sagen 60. Lütolf's spelling "Walschraede" is incorrect for the Dutch Voyage of St. Brandan, better Mone whom he cites and quotes for a post-Medieval poem.) Grimm gave attestations of Waldschrat in medieval romances (Barlaam und Josaphat, Ulrich von Zatzikhoven's Lanzelet) and the poem "Waldschrat" which is a retelling of Bonerius Fable No. 91, none of which provide much physical description except being "dwarf" sized. The Schrat as Waldgeist is physically described as hairy in commentary by Karl Joseph Simrock, and is equated with Räzel (described further under § Nightmare demons); in particular, the trait of the single joined eyebrow, is held to be common to the woodland schrat, the Alp, and sorcerers (cf. § Connections with the devil, witches, and deceased souls), some capable of werewolf-transformation. The last bit (wolflike teeth) appears to be clipped from the description of the "Walschrande" encountered in the Middle Dutch version of the story of St. Brendan's Voyage. These Walschrande were described as having swines' heads, wolves' teeth, human hands, and hounds' legs that were shaggy. Celtic origin has been argued in scholarship concerning the schrat in the Arthurian cycle works (e.g. Ulrich's Lanzelet, adaptation of Lancelot) and the legend of St. Brendan who was an Irish monk. (Note: Roger Sherman Loomis (1951) traces the dwarf/schrat to Welsh Beli Mawr. The beings met by St. Brendan were, in the original telling, birdlike "fallen angels/neutral angels": these beings are perhaps not according to strict orthodox Christian doctrine, but influenced by Irish lore that fairies are fallen angels.)

The Austrian Schrat (pl. Schratln) or Waldkobold looks like the creature as described above: it is small and usually solitary. The Schratln love the deep, dark forest and will move away if the forest is logged. The Schrat likes to play malicious pranks and tease evilly. If offended, it breaks the woodcutters' axes in two and lets trees fall in the wrong direction.

In the Swiss valley Muotatal, before 1638 there was an Epiphany procession called Greifflete associated with two female wood sprites, Strudeli and Strätteli, the latter being a derivative of Schrat.

== Mining demon ==
A Schrattel can be a Goldteufel (gold devil) that can be made to serve a human, bringing his master gold or silver found in the Pusterwald region, according to the legend from Styria in Austria; the legend was recorded by Fridolin von Freythall in his novel Das Hochgericht vom Birkachwald.

== Nightmare demon ==
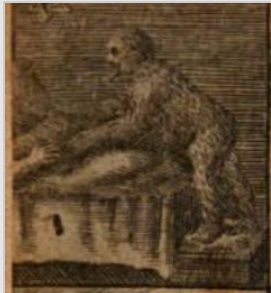
Alp, Schrat (Schröteln), or nightmare ―engraving by Thomas Cross, Sr. (fl. 1632-1682), frontispiece to Praetorius (1668) [1666] Anthropodemus Plutonicus.

The Alp of German folklore, in the strict sense, refers to an Alptraum (nightmare) causing demon, and is associated with pressure like a horse is riding on the sleeper, with stifling against the pillow, and hence respiratory and other sicknesses. (Note: And "Alp" is the common standard and Central Germany name for it, while Mahr or mare (folklore) is used in Northern Germany,) This tends to be known by the name Schrat or its variants in Southern Germany and Switzerland, especially in regions with Alemannic dialect. Such a demon is also considered a sickness demon, as explained above.

=== Forms ===
The Alptraum nightmare was known locally under diminutive names such as Schrättele: Schrättel in Switzerland; (Note: Grimm's footnote 17) to the poem in Altd. Wälder 3. XVIII. (66.)) or Schrättlein; Schrattele, Schrettele in Upper Swabia; Schrecksele around Horb (district), Bühl, Wurmlingen in Swabia, or Schrätzmännel (Note: -männel is dialectal diminutive of Mann, i.e. "manikin".) in "Munster valley" (German: Münstertal, Vallée de Munster) in Alsace. (Note: Münstertal in Elsaß (Alsace) given in Hertz's anthology of tales from Alsace; Stöber more specifically gives Mühlbach (now Muhlbach-sur-Munster).) (Note: Also called Doggele in Illzach, Alsace. The form Doggeli is mentioned by Stoll.)

Other forms are: Strädel, Schrätele, Schrätel, Schrattl, Schrattel, Schratel, Schrättlig, Schrätzel; Schreckle, Schrecksel; (corrupted forms based on German Schreck = fear or fright), Scherzel (a corrupted form reminiscent of German Scherz = jest), Rettele, Rätzel, Ritzel, Letzel, and Letzekäppel (Käppel = little cap).

In the historic state of Baden (and also particularly in Swabia), the Schrättele enters by crawling through the keyhole and sits on the sleeper's chest. (Note: Non Schrat- diminutives in Baden-Württemberg: Drückerle (presser) occurs at the Lenninger Lauter, Neidlinger Valley, and Filsthal; and Nachtmännle (night manikin) at Hohenstaufen.) It can also enter through the window as a black hen. The Swabian schrettele is named as the perpetrator of the "Alp-pressure" (Albdrücken) bearing down upon the human sleeper's chest or throat.

=== Livestock dream spirits ===
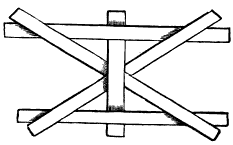
Das Schrattlgatter ("schrat-gate") built by farmers as a charm against the Schrettl or Schrattl to safeguard livestock

In Tirol, it is said the Schrettl or Schrattl (Schrattel) to the livestock is similar to what the dream-demon Trud (drude) is to humans. It supposedly pins down livestock with Schrattldruck ("Schrattl-pressure"), and the affected cattle, pigs, or hens lie down as if paralyzed or dead. Tirolian farmers try to guard against this sprite by crafting the Das Schrattlgatter ("Scrattl-gate") from wooden slats (five pieces of wood interlocked, like a sideways-turned "H" and "X" combined, cf. fig. right), (Note: Cf. also the "Drudenfuss", the pentagram for warding off the drude.) and it is alleged hanging one in the henhouse has saved it.

In Switzerland, the Schrättlig sucks the udders of cows and goats dry and makes horses become schretig, i.e. fall ill. In Swabia, the Schrettele also sucks human breasts and animal udders until they swell, tangles horse manes, and makes Polish plaits. In Austria, The Schrat tangles horse tails and dishevels horse manes.

=== Witches, possessions, ghosts ===
Often, the nightmare demon Schrat is in truth a living human. This Schrättlich or Schrätelhexe (Schrat witch) can easily be identified due to their characteristic eyebrows grown together, the so-called Räzel or Rätzel trait, sometimes applied to the mysterious beings often associated with the Schrat. The appellations Raz, Räzel (Rätzel) was likely an apheresis of Shräzel (Shrätzel), according to Wilhelm Hertz.

In Swabia, the Schratt is a woman suffering from an hereditary ailment known as schrättleweis gehen or Schrattweisgehen (both: going in the manner of a Schrat) which is an affliction usually inherited from one's mother. The afflicted person will have to step out every night at midnight, i.e. the body will lie around as if dead but the soul will have left it in the shape of a white mouse. The Schratt is impelled to "press" (German drücken) something or someone, be it human, cattle, or tree. The nightly Drücken is very exhausting, making the Schratt ill. Only one thing can free the Schratt from her condition. She must be allowed to press the best horse in the stable to death.

According to other Swabian beliefs, the nightmare-bringing Schrat is a child who died unbaptized. In Baden, it is considered a deceased relative of the nightmare victim.

=== Protective amulets ===
The Schrat is further known to cause illnesses by shooting arrows. Its arrow is the belemnite (called Schrattenstein, Schrat stone), but his stone can also be used to ward the spirit off. Beside the Schrattenstein, it also fears the pentagram (called Schrattlesfuß, Schrat foot in Swabia) and stones of the same name with dinosaur footprints. The Schrätteli can be exterminated by burning the bone whose appearance it takes when morning comes. The same is true for burning the straw caught at night, for in the morning it will become a woman covered with burns and never return again. If it is cut with a Schreckselesmesser (Schrat knife), a knife with three crosses on its blade, the Schrettele will also never return again. The Schrat can be kept out of stables by placing the aforementioned wooden Schratlgatter (Schrat fence) above the stable door, or using a convex mirror called Schratspiegel (Schrat mirror) which also works the same way.

== Domestic sprite ==
=== Middle High German literature ===
In the Middle High German story "Schrätel und Wasserbär" (13th cent.), the kobold haunts a peasant's house, but the Danish king lodges there with the polar bear, and after the encounter with the "giant cat" the spirit is frightened away.

A version of this story set in a miller's house in Berneck (Bad Berneck im Fichtelgebirge), Upper Franconia, Bavaria, where a Holzfräulein replaces the Schrätel, and is killed by a "cat".

The Schrätel (schrattel) as a peace-disturber or poltergeist also figures in the Tyrolean poet Hans Vintler's Die Pluemen der Tugent (completed 1411). (Note: The sprite here also bestows the siegstein (stone of victory).)

=== Local lore ===
The term Schrat (or its variants) is thought to have occurred more widely in the sense of "house sprite" in the past. According to belief from the 15th century, every house has a schreczlein which, if honored by the inhabitants of the house, gives its human owners property and honor.

But the sense of Schrat as a Hausgeist or kobold only survived in Southeastern Germany, and West Slavic Regions. More specifically, Schrat as domestic sprite is particularly known in Bavaria (the Upper Palatinate, the Fichtel Mountains extending to Czechia; also Vogtland which spills into Saxony and Thuringia), and the Austrian provinces of Styria and Carinthia. In these parts (Southeastern Germany and Austria), the Schrat remains more akin to a domestic kobold, only occasionally appearing as an incubus. The form Schrezala was current in the Fichtelgebirge (Note: Also Schretselein in Fichtelgebirge, according to Zapf.) and Vogtland.

In Styria, the forms Schrätel, Schratel are glossed as penates (hearth deities) c. 1500. (Note: "Schrätel, Schratel = penates. Vocabularius anno 1506, Graz University in Styria, apud ZfVk8 p. 464, cited by Ranke (1936) n9).) The Schratl of Carinthia is said to manifest itself as sunlight patterns on walls in the Mölltal and Lesachtal valleys, as a small blue flame or a red face popping out the window in Gailtal; he is considered invisible in Drautal, but perceptible by the noises in the walls similar to the cutting-sound of scythes, while the Carinthian Schratelmannel (Schrat manikin) is also reputed to make knocking noises in the bedroom walls at night like a Kobold or poltergeist. The Schratl of Styria is said to be a grunting little man dressed in red or green.

In Styria and Carinthia, the Schratl dwells inside the stove, expecting to be given millet gruel for its services. In Styria, this stove or oven (called Schratlofen; Schrat stove) might also be a solitary rock formation or rock hole rather than a true stove. When summoned, it sits down on the doorstep.

In Carinthia, the Schratl can be intentionally driven away by gifting it clothes. The same motif (Note: Stith-Thompson's motif index F405.11. "House spirit leaves when gift of clothing is left for it". Also occurs in Harry Potter series, Dobby the house elf.) is exhibited in the story of the schretzchen (Kremnitzmühle, Upper Franconia, Bavaria), except the grateful mistress of the house unwittingly gave clothes as reward to the helpful spirit because it was dressed in tatters. The schretzelein that causes mischief in the stables is considered a type of kobold also, as it actually dwells in the house. (Note: A chronicle of Hof, Bavaria, cited by Köhler. Köhler's remark that it is a kobold.) (Note: Köhler also considers as related the narrative concerning the Bilwis: Haupt, Karl ed. (1862) No. 70. "Die Pilweisen zu Lauban", Sagenbuch der Lausitz. 1: 68. Köhler's classification as "kobold" is also consistent with Grimm's DM discussing the "home-sprites" that take up residence in stables, which will care for cattle but also do them grievous harm, even though the only specific sprite named doing stable chores (quoted from Samuel Meiger) is wolterken[s].)

The schratl also is blamed for causing stabbing pains and "elflocks" (polish plaits), which are referred to locally as schratlzopf (standardized as schratelzopf). (Note: Grimm also lists English "elflocks" alongside alpzopf, drutenzopf, mahrenlocke and even conjectures it may be called *bilweichszopf, based on the sprite name Bilwis. Though Grimm lists the forms for the alp, trud, mahr and omits "schratlzopf", extending it here to "elf lock" is sufficiently grounded. Kelemina glosses it as Polish plait (ptico polnico).)

A tale from Wagendorf recounts how a man outwitted a Schratl by demanding he fill his boot with money, actually only the cut-off tube of his boot, attached to his roof-ridge. The sprite brought money day and night that spilled into a big pile without achieving his boot-full, and finally died of exhaustion.

The Polish skrzat (often equated with latawiec, 'the flying one') demands kasha (kasza, porridge) for payment and insists it is not overly hot.

== Animal forms ==
The Schratel reputedly appears often in the guise of a cat or squirrel in Styria. Schratzl in the guise of a black cat was driven out from Kirchberg an der Raab into some ditch. Farmers in Donnersbachwald (in Styria) claimed the Schratl can appear as a chamois, buck-goat, or black dog. (Note: Schlossar (1892), p. 168, informant: Mr. K. Reiterer from Donnersbachwald. The local alias of Boxhidlbua (Boxhörndlbua) for the sprite is also recorded.)

The Schrattel appears as a black raven in a tale of a man who contracted with the demon and loses his soul (Ennstal, Styria). It is also commented that "Schratel" was once a name commonly given to a dog in Styria. In Upper Carinthia, in the vicinity of Radenstein (=Rottenstein, Bad Kleinkirchheim), the caterpillar is called and thus identified as Schratel. (Note: HdA "Raupe", at note 34) citing Dr. Kransmayer (oral). It is noted a similar appellation occurs in Egerland, Czech Republic, citing ZföVk. 2, 329; Natur 2, 88, but was not confirmed in the first of these sources.) The butterfly is sometimes called schrätteli, schrâtl, schràttele or schrèttele and accordingly identified with the nightmare demon Schrätteli. Sorcerers with unibrow (like the Schratel) are reputedly capable of sending an Alp in the guise of a butterfly to people who are asleep (cf. § witches).

The Schretel appears as a butterfly according to the lore in the Tyrol region (Austria) as well as Sarganserland of the Canton of St. Gallen in Switzerland; in St. Gallen, the creature may appear also in the guise of a magpie, fox, or black cat.

Legends from Obermumpf, Aargau, Switzerland say that the Wanzenschneider, a sort of black magician also known widely in the Black Forests in Germany, could transform into a Toggeli or a Schrätteli, or a red mouse, to creep up on people who are asleep, enter through open mouths, reach the heart, and ride people leaving them half-dead or paralyzed until expelled from the mouth. The sorcerer died but still loitered around as a spirit in the form of a black dog and was finally purged by the Capuchin monks of the Franciscan order.

=== Egg-hatched, chicken-shaped ===
There is the motif recorded for kobolds under various names across many regions including Pomerania that the sprite is born from an egg laid by a hen. The Polish skrzat in Posen is reputedly born from a hen's egg of a certain peculiar shape, hatched after being kept in the armpit for a long time, (Note: Knoop (1893) XXXII. Der Skrzat oder Skrzatel XXXII, Der Skrzat oder Skrzatel" p. 111, and Kolberg (1882) cited by Polívka (1918), p. 50.) (Note: Moszyński (1967). Raised from a black hen's egg, kept under the armpit for 9 days.) and likewise in Kolberg (Kołobrzeg). A number of Polish anecdotes relate that the skrzat appears in the guise of a chicken, a black chicken, an emaciated chicken, or a flying bird with sparks flying.

Or else, the škrat could be bred from a black hen, or hired otherwise, but to obtain its services one had to sign away himself and his family sealed in a blood signed contract. Then, it would bring such items as the contractor desired to the window and when carrying money it assumed the form of fire.

== Dwarf ==
The Alsatian Schrätzmännel also appear as dwarves (German Zwerge, sg. Zwerg) dwelling in caves in the woods and mountains.

The same is true for the Razeln or Schrazeln in Upper Palatinate, whose cave dwellings are known as Razellöcher (Schrat holes). Other names for them are Razen, Schrazen, Strazeln, Straseln, and Schraseln. They dwell in the mountains and help the humans with their work, acting as domestic sprites. This they do at night, for they dislike to be seen. They only enter the homes of good people and bring good fortune upon them, expecting the food left over on the dishes as their payment. Any other form of gratitude, especially gifts, will drive them away instead, for they will think their service has been terminated, and they will leave with tears. First they wait, then they eat, and after that they go into the baking oven for dancing and threshing. Ten pairs or at least twelve Razen are said to fit inside an oven for threshing.

== Connections with the devil, witches, and deceased souls ==
A red secretion left behind at trees by butterflies is said to be the blood of the Schrätlein or Schretlein who are wounded and chased by the devil (German Teufel). Conversely, the Schrat can also be identified as the devil itself.

Schrättlig is a synonym for witch (German Hexe). In Tyrol and the Sarganserland, the Schrättlig also is thought to be the soul of a deceased evildoer living among people as an ordinary human, particularly an old woman. It is able to take on animal appearance and often harms humans, animals, and plants. It also causes storms and tempests, but it can also become a luck-bringing domestic sprite identified with lares and penates.

The Schrat might also show behavior similar to the devil or witches. In Carinthia, whenever somebody wants to hang oneself, a Schratt will come and nod in approval. The Schrat travels in the whirlwind as well, hence the whirlwind is known as Schretel or schrádl in Bavaria and the Burgenland respectively.

In Bavaria and Tyrol, the souls of unbaptized children forming the retinue of Stempe (i.e. Perchta) are called Schrätlein. Like Perchta, the schretelen were offered food on Epiphany Day in 15th century Bavaria.

== Yiddish folklore ==
=== Shretele ===
Among the Yiddish-speaking Jews of Eastern Europe, there is belief in the helper or wealth-multiplying spirit called shretele, probably connected to Polish skrzat, (pl. shretelekh) which they might have brought with them when they came from Alsace and Southern Germany.

The shretele is very kind. It is described as a small elflike creature, more specifically a tiny, handsome, raggedly dressed little man. Shretelekh can be found in human homes where they like to help out, e.g. by finishing up the making of shoes overnight at a shoemaker's home. If given tiny suits in gratitude, they will stop working and sing that they look too glorious for work, dancing out of the house and leaving good fortune behind.

The shretele might also stretch out a tiny hand from the chimney corner, asking for food. If given something, e.g. some cracklings (gribenes), it will make the kitchen work successful. For example, if pouring goose fat from a frying pan into containers, one might be able to do so for hours, filling all containers in the house without emptying the pan – until someone cusses about this. Cussing will drive the shretele away.

The shretele might also dwell under the bed. From there it might come out to rock the baby's cradle, give the baby a light slap to make it stop crying, or nip from a brandy bottle. A bottle from which a shretele has sipped will always remain full no matter how much is poured out.

=== Kapelyushnikl ===
In Yiddish folklore, the function of the nightmare demon belongs to another kind of legendary creature, the kapelyushnikl (Polish for hat maker; pl. kapelyushniklekh). It is a hat-wearing little being bent on pestering and teasing horses. It can only be found in Slavic countries and might even be an original East European Jewish creation.

The kapelyushniklekh can appear as a male and female pair of tiny beings wearing little caps; the woman also having braided hair tied with pretty ribbons.

They are said to ride horses all night, with many kapelyushniklekh sitting on one horse, rendering the animal exhausted and sweating. Kapelyushniklekh are said to prefer gray horses in particular. If one manages to snatch a cap from a kapelyushnikl, they will be driven away for good. Only the one who lost its cap will come and ask for its return, in exchange for a great deal of gold, though in daylight the gold will have turned into a pile of rocks.

They can also milk cows dry at night and steal the milk, but if caught and beaten, they promise that, if spared, they will never return and that the amount of milk given by the cows will be double of what it originally used to be which will come true.

== Scandinavian and Baltic folklore ==
In Scandinavian folklore, the skrat is a prankster out in the woods or fields, known for its horse laughs and known particularly to spoil the finds of treasure-hunters, and if the man thinks he spotted a gold ring, the spirit will laugh it away before he has actually gained possession. Commentary classes it as a type of myling. The skrat or skratt is also known among the Estonian Swedes and denotes a devil or ghost. But this is more commonly called kratt (q.v.) (or krätt, rett, rätt) and is a household spirit equivalent of the German Schrat[t]. The kratt more particularly is a "treasure-bearer" (wealth bringer), and the skrat or kratt will enrich his cohabitating farmer by stealing (milk, beer, money) from the neighbor.

This "treasure-bearer" has many aliases (around 30), much of which have different etymologies unrelated to Schrat. In appearance, the kratt (also puuk, nasok) is sometimes an artificial composite creature made of old junk, which is four- or three-legged (cf. the 2017 Estonian movie November); the subtype rahakratt (raha means 'money) is a money-bringer and often takes the form of a human or the composite artificial creature already described. However, the kratt as a group is known by various names and takes on various shapes, including animals such as birds (roosters), dogs (black dogs), or snakes (serpent with a red comb). But even though Charles Dickens as a travel writer reported the skratt as a generous wealth-bringing "fiery dragon", its typical appearance is that of "a huge fiery shape with a long tail", and modern scholarship insists that the kratt has never been described literally as a "flying serpent/dragon" (Note: Slovene: leteče kače; Estonian: lendavad maod[?]) per se in the Estonian folklore record (whereas the Belarusian parallel is the flying serpent летучий змей), even though the alias name pisuhänd ('spark tail') is evocative of a fiery serpent. The Estonian kratt's favourite food is porridge with butter (or "bread-and-butter and two or three types of porridges", which it demands as compensation), in contrast with the Belarusian flying serpent favouring fried eggs. Another point of contrast is that the Estonian kratt (or more generally the Finnish, Swedish, Finnic, Finno-Ugric, Scandinavian, etc. "treasurer-bearer"), does not exhibit the secondary aspect of the "mythological lover", in contrast to the East (and West and South Slavic) "treasure bearer" which also seduces women, the examples of the latter being the aforementioned Polish latawiec ('the flying one) and Belarusian "flying serpent" (cf. Firedrake (folklore)).
