= Gislöv Church =

- Gislövs kyrka
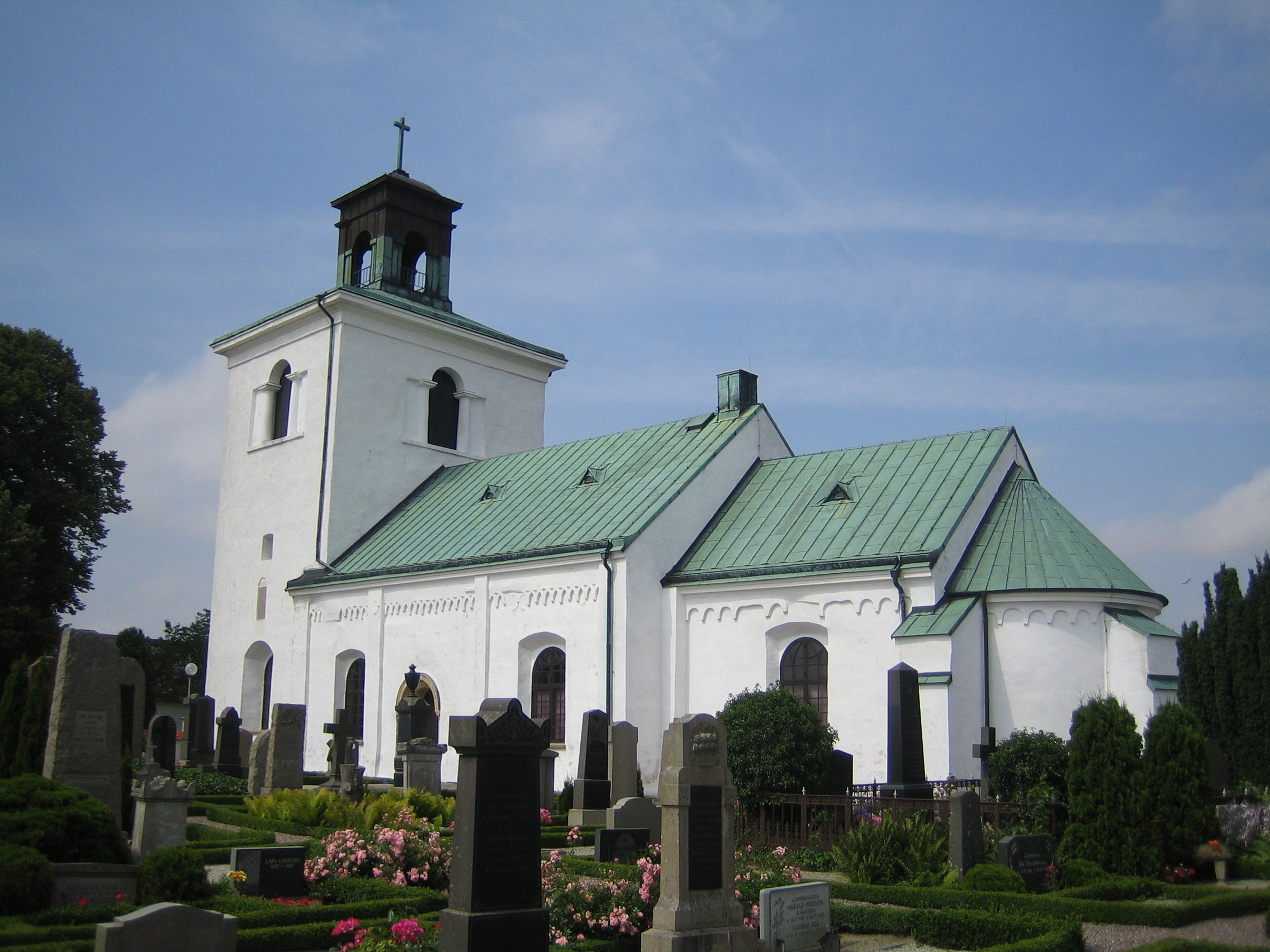
- Gislöv Church, view of the exterior

- 55°22′58″N 13°14′37″E
- Country: Sweden
- Denomination: Church of Sweden

Administration
- Diocese: Lund

Gislöv Church (Swedish: Gislövs kyrka) is a medieval church east of Trelleborg, Sweden. It belongs to the Diocese of Lund.

== History and architecture ==
Gislöv Church is one of the best-preserved medieval churches in Söderslätt in the south of the Swedish province of Skåne. It is also one of the oldest brick churches in Skåne. It probably dates from the late 12th or early 13th century. It can be deduced that the church was built on a private initiative by a local magnate. Some of the details point to artistic influence coming directly from contemporary church architecture in Norway. This has led to the hypothesis that the church was made for a Norwegian archbishop in exile, named Eirik Ivarsson, who is known to have stayed in Skåne between 1190 and 1202. The presently visible church may however have been preceded by an even older, wooden church; north of the church, graves have been discovered that are substantially older than the stone church.

The earliest stone church consisted of a nave, choir and apse. The tower was built during the 15th century. The tower was enlarged in 1824, and as building material stones from ancient dolmens were used. This may in part have been done in an attempt to eradicate vestiges of pagan practices that still survived in the area. Internally, the original, wooden church ceiling was also replaced during the 15th century with the presently visible, richly painted vaults. The murals depict scenes from the Bible and date from the 15th and 16th centuries. Restorative work to preserve the murals was carried out in 1936.

Among the church furnishings, the triumphal cross is from the 13th century while the altarpiece and pulpit are from the 17th century.
