= Jenny Nyström =

Swedish artist (1854–1946)

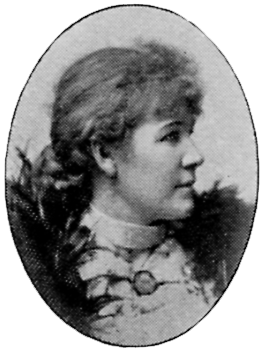
- 1901 portrait of Jenny Nyström
- Born: 13 June 1854; Kalmar
- Died: 17 January 1946 (aged 91); Bromma parish
- Resting place: Norra begravningsplatsen
- Education: Royal Swedish Academy of Fine Arts, Académie Julian
- Occupation: Painter, illustrator, artist, graphic artist

Jenny Eugenia Nyström (13 or 15 June 1854 in Kalmar, Sweden – 17 January 1946 in Stockholm) was a painter and illustrator mainly known as the creator of the Swedish image of the jultomte on Christmas cards and magazine covers, thus linking the Swedish version of Santa Claus to the gnomes and tomtar of Scandinavian folklore.

== Background ==
Her father was a school and piano teacher, and also the cantor of the Kalmar Castle Church. When Jenny Nyström was eight years old, the family moved to Gothenburg, where her father had found a better paying teaching job.

She studied at the Kjellbergska flickskolan. In 1865 she started in the Gothenburg art school Göteborgs Musei-, Rit- och Målarskola, today known as Konsthögskolan Valand, and in 1873 she was admitted to the Royal Swedish Academy of Arts in Stockholm, where she studied for eight years. Thanks to a scholarship, this was followed by studies in Paris 1882–1886, at Académie Colarossi and Académie Julian.

== Career ==
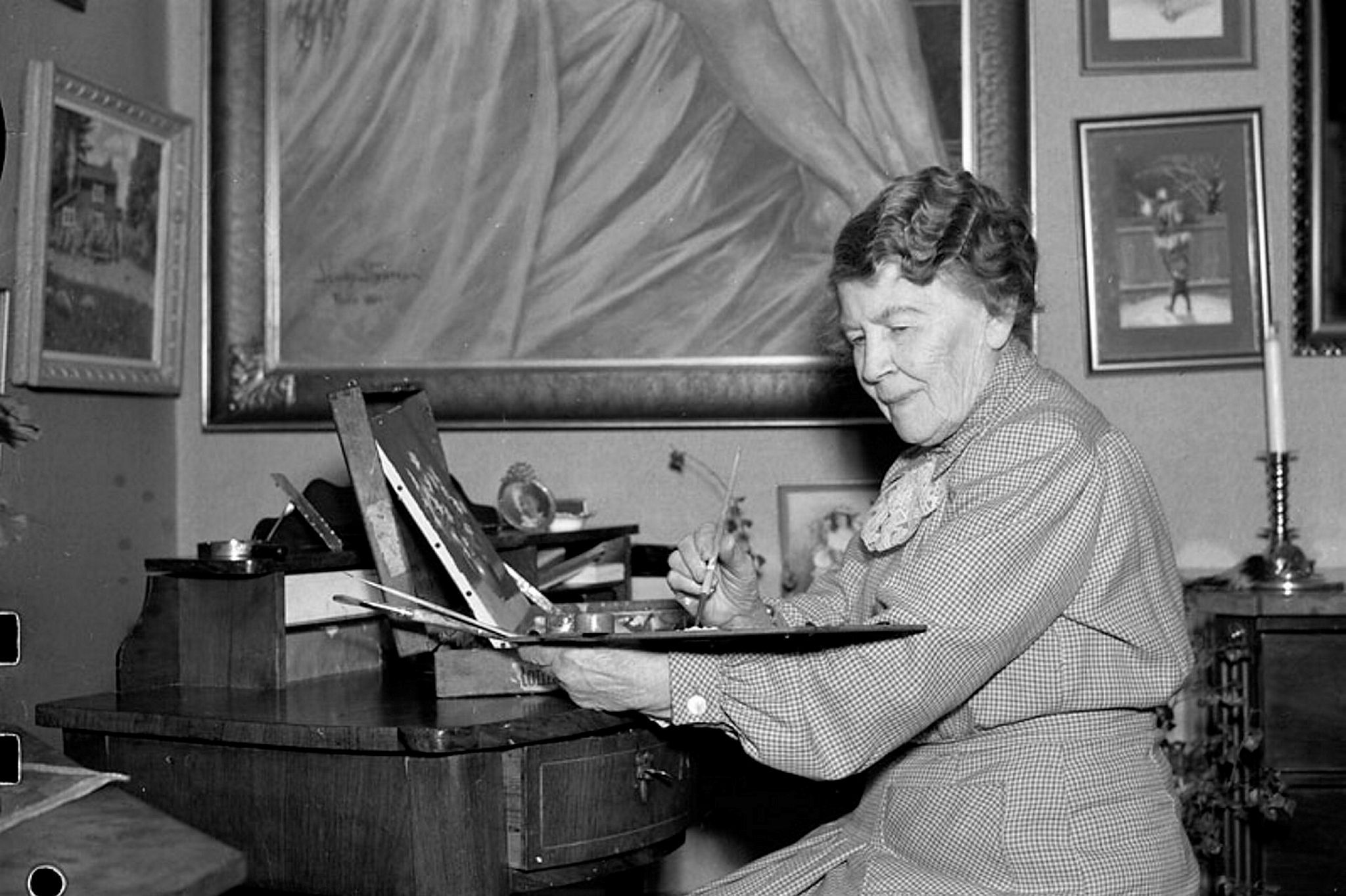
At work, painting at her desk

While in Paris, Nyström discovered the booming postcard market, and tried to persuade the Swedish publishing house Bonnier to start producing postcards, but they declined. Lille Viggs äventyr på julafton ("Little Vigg's Adventures on Christmas Eve"), written by the author Viktor Rydberg inspired Nyström. She made drawings accompanying this tale. Viktor Rydberg saw them and suggested the Bonniers publishing company to release the book. After they declined, publisher S. A. Hedlund released it in 1871. The short Christmas tale for all ages was widely printed and has since become a Christmas classic in Sweden. Jenny Nyström eventually became Sweden's most productive painter and illustrator. For many years, her illustrations were distributed by Strålin & Persson AB in Falun.

In 1887, at the age of 33, she married medical student Daniel Stoopendaal (1853-1927), brother of fellow artists Henrik Wilhelm Johan Stoopendaal (1846 - 1906), Ferdinand Jacob Stoopendaal (1850-), and Georg Vilhelm Stoopendaal (1866-1953). Due to tuberculosis Daniel was never able to finish his studies and take up his intended profession. It was instead up to Jenny to support herself, her husband and their son through her artistry, while Daniel handled her business affairs. He died in 1927.

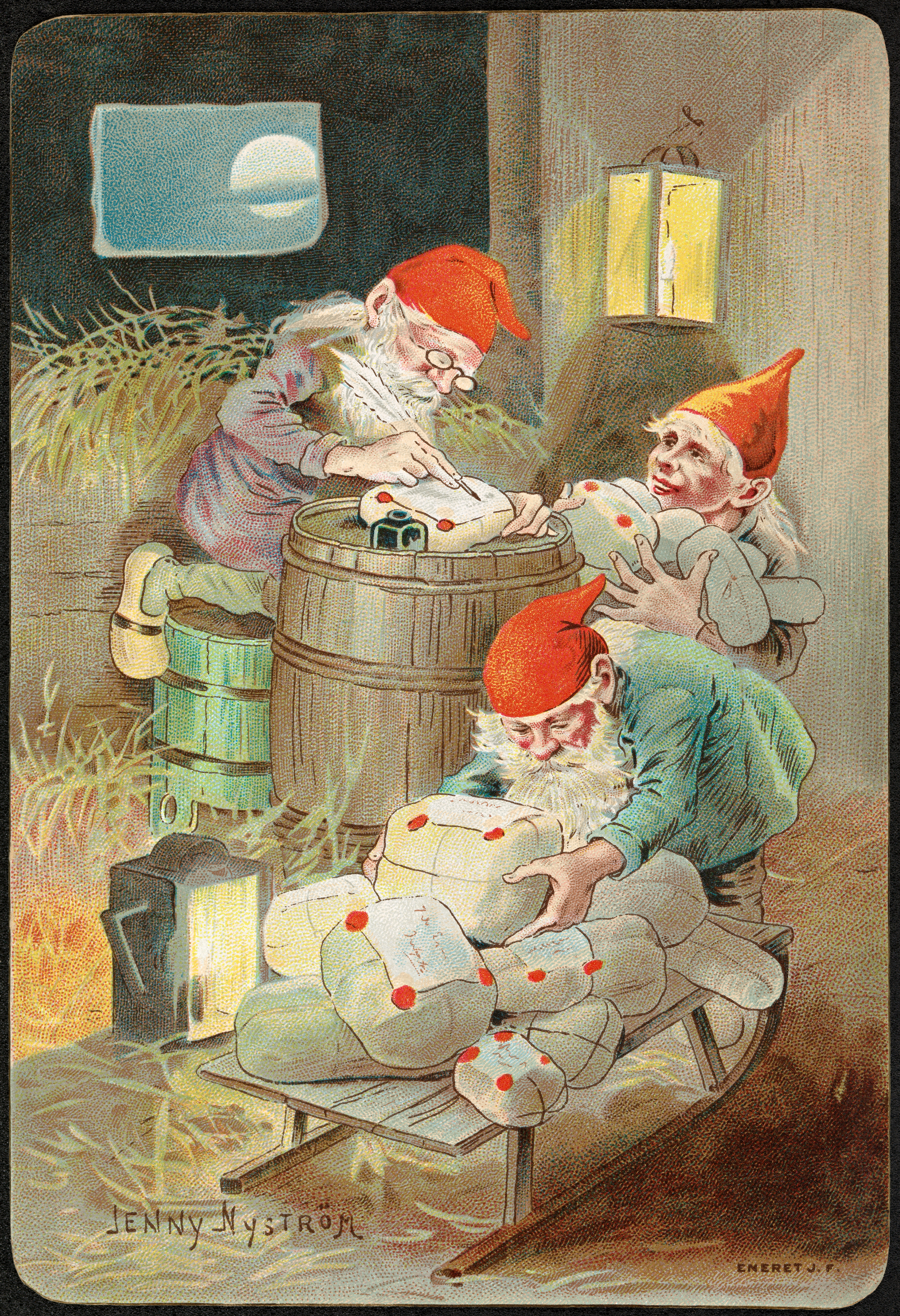
Christmas card with jultomte by Nyström, c. 1899

In 1933 her son, Curt Nyström Stoopendahl (1893-1965), followed in her footsteps and also became a popular postcard and poster artist, staying very close to his mother's artistic style. Even his signature, "Curt Nyström", looked like his mother's. Likewise, her brother-in-law, Georg Stoopendaal, already in the beginning of the 19th century found postcards to be a good source of income, unlike his more serious paintings, and his Christmas cards are also clearly inspired by Jenny Nyström's.

== Santa Claus and Christmas ==
Nyström created the Swedish image of the jultomte on numerous Christmas cards and magazine covers, thus linking the Swedish version of Santa Claus to the gnomes of Scandinavian folklore.

== Selected illustrations ==
- Fornnordiska sagor, Albert Ulrik Bååth, author (1886) (early Norse tales)
- Den poetiska Eddan, Nils Frederick Sander, author (1893) (the poetic Edda)
- Barnkammarens Bok (Stockholm: Fahlcrantz & Co. 1903) (the nursery book)

== See also ==
- Haddon Sundblom

== Gallery ==
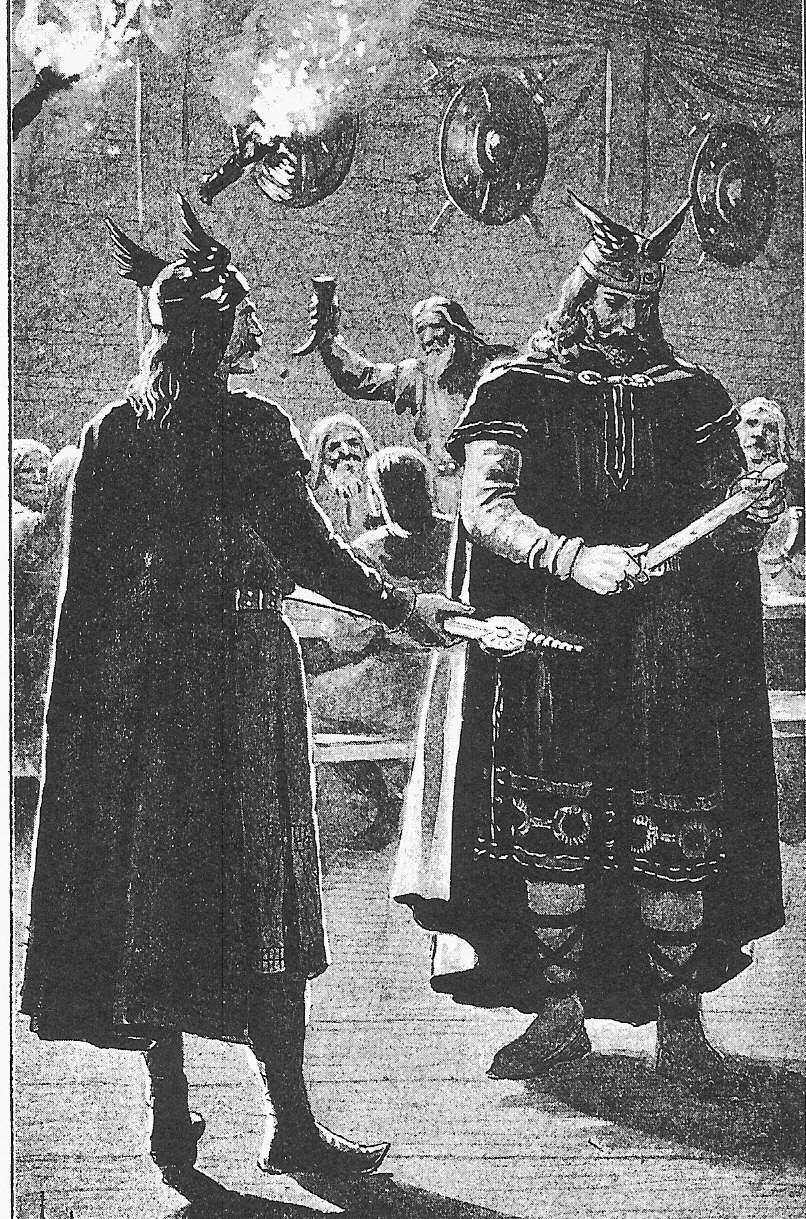
Hjorvard and
Rolf Krake
(1895)

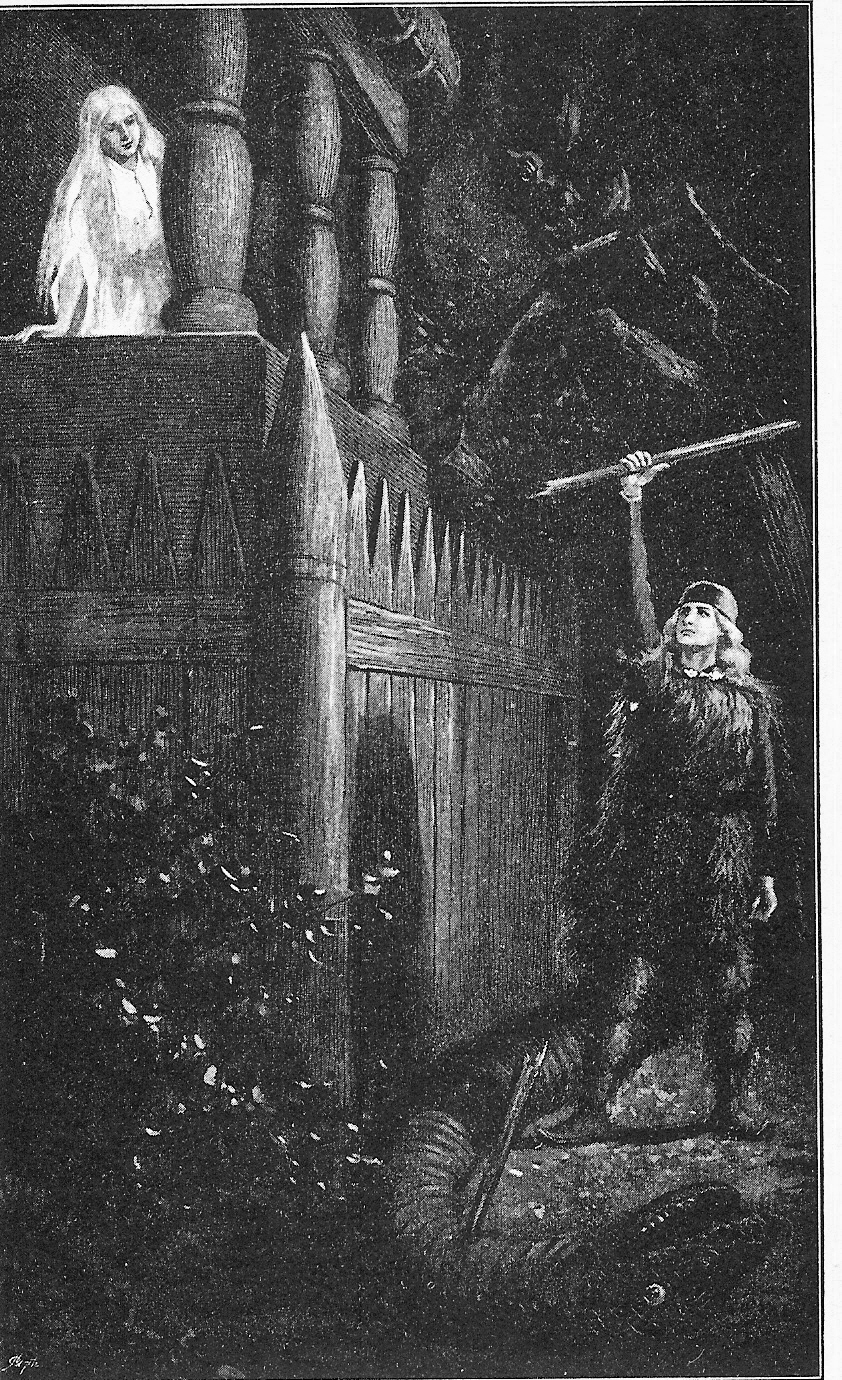
Thora Borgarhjort
(1895)

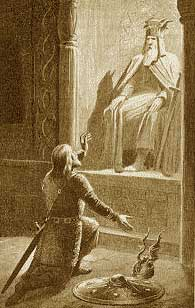
Eric the victorious
(1895)

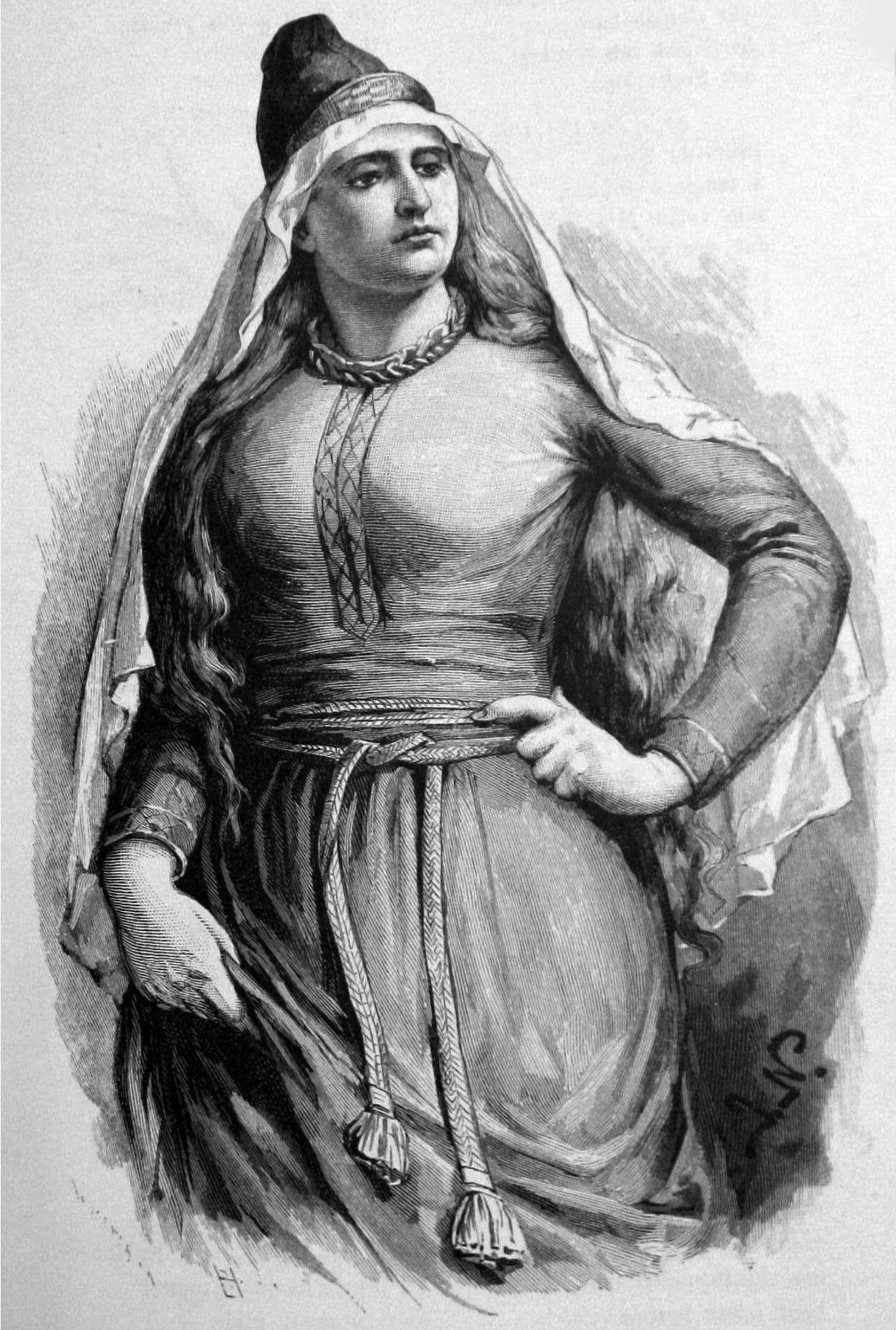
Frigg, wife of Odin
(1893)

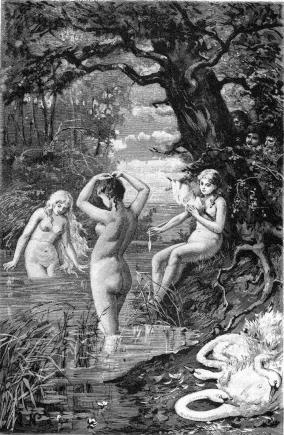
Valkyries with
swan skins
(1893)

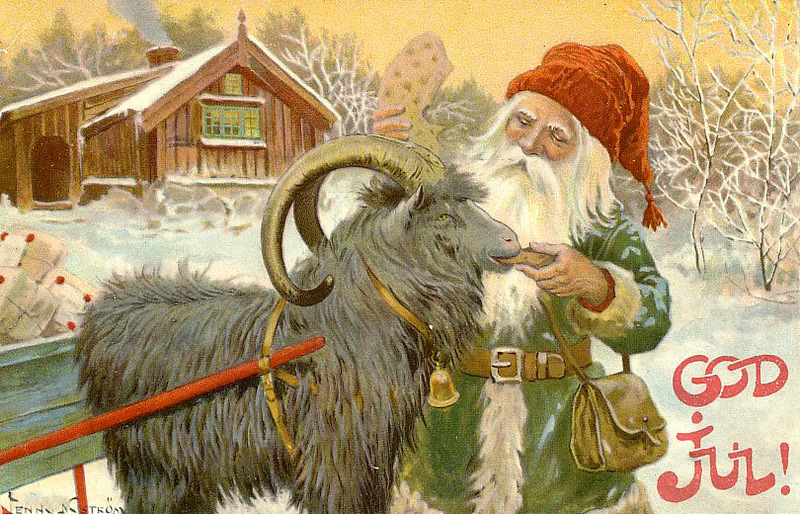
God Jul ("Happy Christmas!")

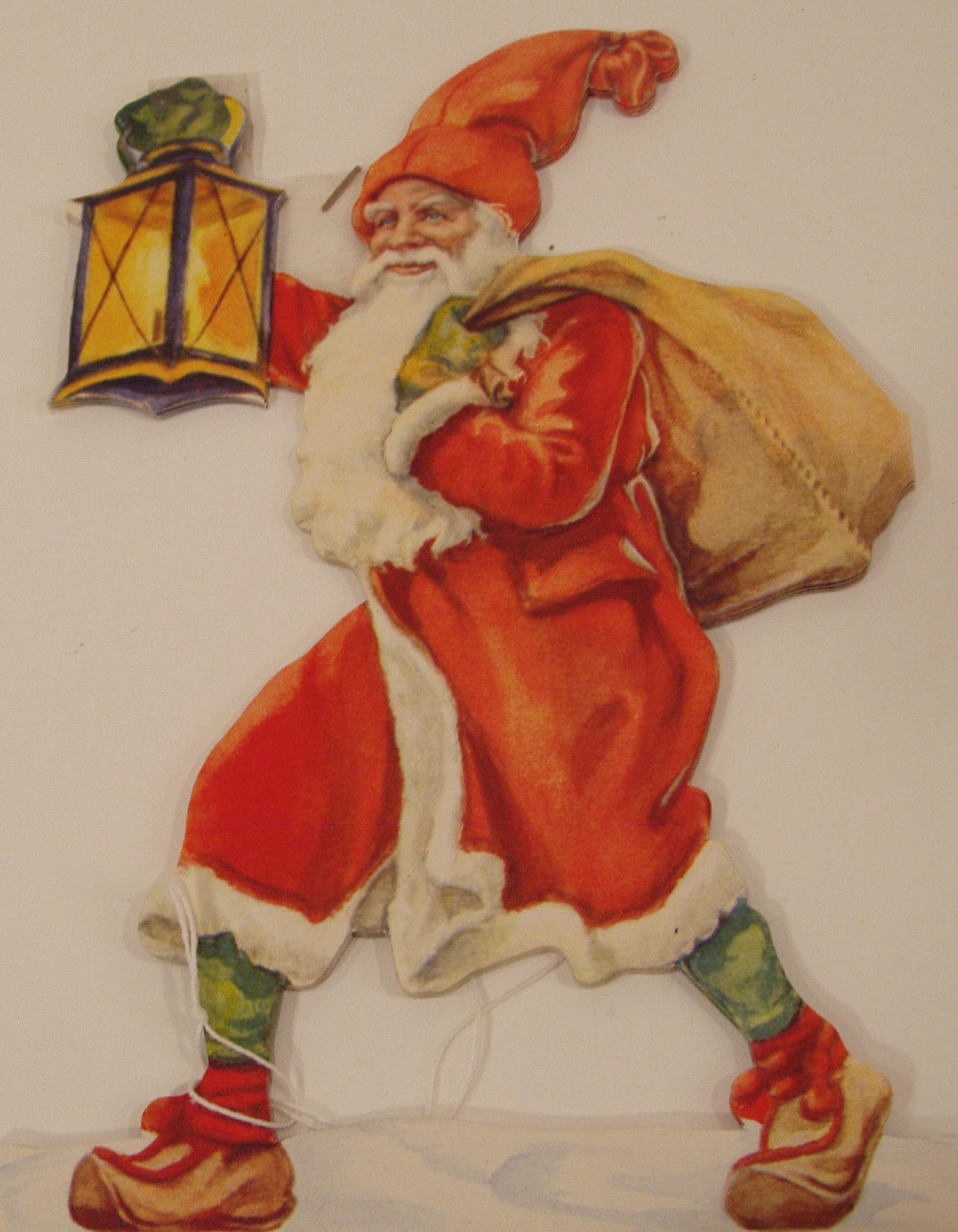
Commercial Christmas card

== Other sources ==
- Forsberg Warringer, Gunnel Jenny Nyström: konstnärinna (1992)
- Forsberg Warringer, Gunnel Jenny Nyström: målaren och illustratören (1996)
