= Albert Ulrik Bååth =

Swedish poet and author

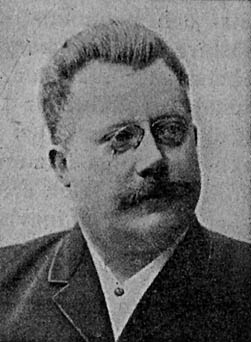
- Bååth, some time between 1880 and 1912.
- Born: July 13, 1853; Malmö
- Died: August 2, 1912 (aged 59); Gothenburg
- Education: Doctor of Philosophy, 1886; Lund University
- Occupation(s): Translator, lecturer, poet and writer
- Movement: Literary realism
- Relatives: Cecilia Bååth-Holmberg (sister)

Signature
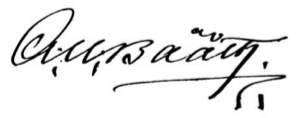

Albert Ulrik Bååth, often mentioned as A.U. Bååth (13 July 1853, in Malmö, Sweden – 2 August 1912, in Gothenburg, Sweden) was a Swedish poet, translator, lecturer and author. He was a senior lecturer in Old Norse literature at Gothenburg University College from 1881 until 1911. He was the brother of Cecilia Bååth-Holmberg.

== Biography ==
Bååth was born the son of Lorentz Andreas Bååth, a Malmö preacher who, four years after his son's birth, would become a reverend in Hammarlöv. Bååth was therefore raised in Söderslätt, while attended a school in Malmö and would in 1871 become a student at Lund University. Early on, he caught an interest for the Icelandic language, particularly when visiting Copenhagen after receiving a stipend, when he was acquainted with lexicographer and author of an Icelandic dictionary, Eirikur Jonsson.

In 1877, he graduated from Lund University with a B.A degree in philosophy and would move on to take his licentiate degree in 1884 and eventually finishing his doctoral thesis Studier öfver kompositionen i några isländska ättsagor in 1886. Between 1875 and 1879, he was a teacher at the higher education academy Hvilan where he would come to meet the principal Leonard Holmström. For some years, Bååth worked as a lecturer in Gothenburg and, in 1891, he would be named Intendent for the Gothenburg Museum's department of ethnography, as well as senior lecturer in Old Nordic literature at what would eventually become University of Gothenburg. Additionally, he was active for some years as a lecturer with Gothenburg's workers institute. His name is written on the balcony of the grand hall of the Academic Society's Castle in Lund.

The Nordic enlightenment of the 1870s made a significant impression on Bååth, and this time had a profound impact on his works. He enthusiastically partook in the folk high school movement. In addition to his poetry, Bååth has also published works on Old Nordic literature and culture, and has also interpreted prominent Icelandic works.

He was named a member of the Royal Society of Arts and Sciences in Gothenburg in 1889.

=== Private life ===
Bååth married Emma Charlotta "Lulli" Ahlberg (1864–1964) in 1894, who would outlive her husband by 52 years. Bååth was the brother of Cecilia Bååth-Holmberg.

== Additional reading ==
- Bendz, Emma. A. U. Bååth och hans krets (in Swedish). Stockholm: Geber. LIBRIS 1317250.
- Bolin, Bengt (1946). A. U. Bååth. Hallsberg. LIBRIS 8072951.
- Böök, Fredrik (1926). "Åttiotalslyrik: 2. A. U. Bååth". Från åttiotalet. Stockholm: Norstedt. pp. 18–35. LIBRIS: 31143.
- Fredlund, Knut (1912). A. U. Bååths diktning: en öfversikt. Stockholm. LIBRIS: 2994589.
- Johnsson, G. Waldemar (1934). "A. U. Bååth: Nialssagans översättare: en banbrytare för den skånska litteraturen". Brage: Organ för SBF:s ungdomsorganisationer: Folkbildnings-, studie- och hembygdsskrift. 1934(9):3: 154–160. LIBRIS: 11174025.
- Larsson, Hans Emil (1918). "Ett och annat ur mina minnen från studenttiden och mitt samliv med Bååth". Under Lundagårds kronor: [Samling 1], en minneskrans vid tvåhundrafemtioårsfesten af gamla studenter minnen upptecknade av gamla studenter. 1918: 349–382. LIBRIS: 11679333.
- Sprengel, David (1902). De nya poeterna: 80-talet: dokument och kåserier. Stockholm: Gernandt. pp. 265–279. LIBRIS: 8072767.
- Österling, Anders (1960). Albert Ulrik Bååth: minnesteckning. Svenska akademiens minnesteckningar, 0346-6361. Stockholm: Norstedts. LIBRIS: 368581.
