= Nis Puk =

Legendary creature in Danish, Frisian and German mythology

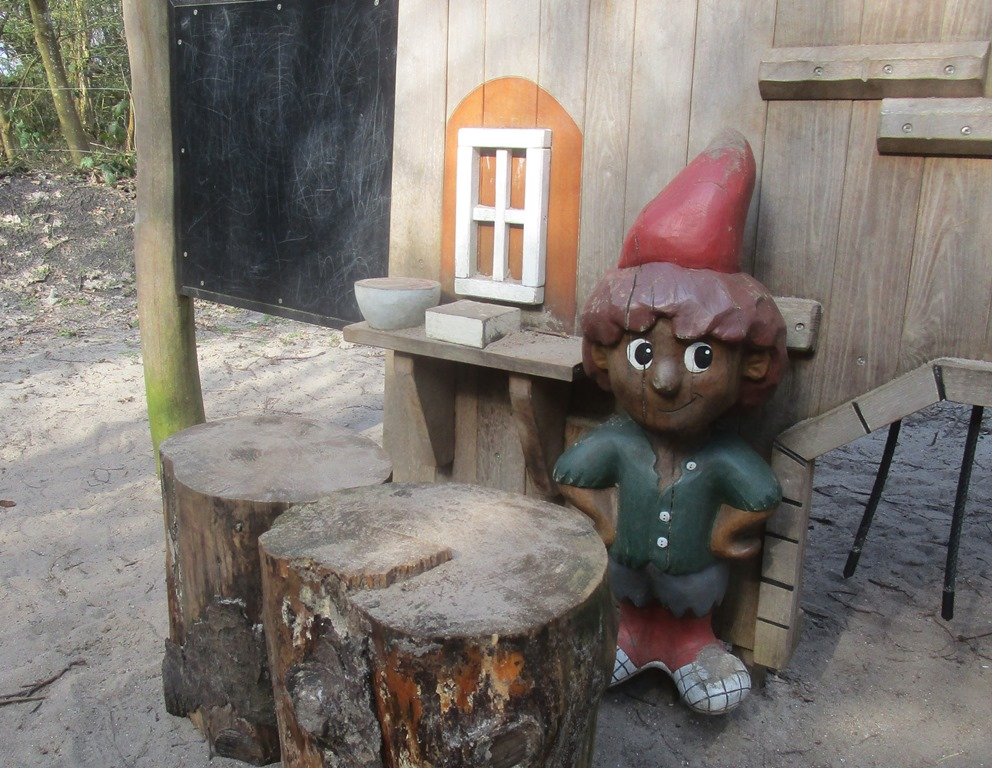
Nis Puk in the "legendary forest" on Sylt

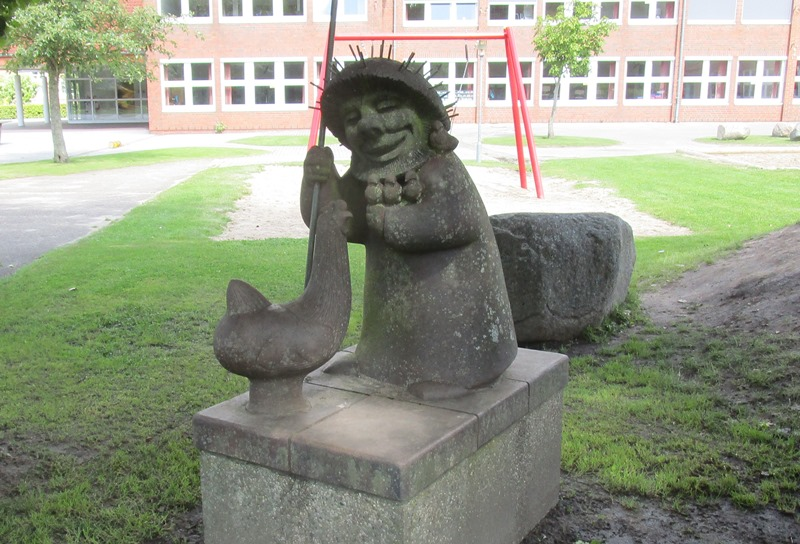
Statue of Nis Puk in Neukirchen/Nykirke

The Nis Puk (sometimes also Niß Puk (German: [ˈnɪs pʊk])) is a legendary creature, a kind of Kobold, from Danish-, Low German- and North Frisian-speaking areas of Northern Germany and Southern Denmark, among them Schleswig, today divided into the German Southern Schleswig and Danish Northern Schleswig. It is also known in Denmark itself as nis pug, as a variant of nisse.

An earlier saying says Nissen does not want to go over the Eideren, i.e. not to Holstein to the South of Schleswig. Depending on the place, it can either appear as a domestic spirit or take on the role of a being generally called Drak or Kobold in Danish and German mythology, an infernal spirit making its owner wealthy by bringing them stolen goods.

The term combines the terms Nisse and Puck. The Nis Puk or Niß Puk can also be referred to as just Niß, Nis or Puk. The figure of the Nisse is widespread in Denmark, Norway, Scania, Halland and Blekinge (here as Goanisse or Godnisse≈the good Nisse), the figure of the Puk can further be found in the (formerly) German-speaking regions of Pomerania and Neumark, belonging partially or completely to Poland today.

== Name variations ==
Variations of its name are Nißpuk, Niß-Puck, Nis Puck, Nis Puk, Nispuk, Niß Pug, Nisse Pok, Neß Puk, Nißkuk or Neßkuk, Nisebok, Nisebuk, Niskepuk or Nische Puk.

Also there are Niß, Niss, Nis, Neß or Nisch. The Danish Nisse (q.v.) appears in earlier times to have been called puge, with medieval attestations, and the Danish form nis pug is also known as variant to nisse in some local folklore (var. nis puge (Note: "Nis Pug" is employed in a 1053 illustrated children's book by Gerda Nystad)).

Further there are Puk, Puck, Pug, Pûks or Hauspuk (“house Puk”).

Plural forms are Niskepuks, Nisken, Husniskens, Hausnischen (both “little house Nißs”), Husknechtkens (“little house servants”), Puke, Puken, Puge, Pûkse, Pücken or Hauspuken (“house Puks”). and in Danish Nis Pukker

One Pug is known to have had the proper name Bartel.

== Etymology ==
The form Nis Puk is described as a "tautological juxtaposition" of two words meaning the same thing.

The name Niß said to be derived from the proper name Nikolaus, i.e., Nicholas (see also Nisse for other etymology of this stem). The name Puk is attested in the Old Danish form puge, (Note: It is for example attested in the 1510 Danish edition in of the Lucidarius (printed by Gotfred af Ghemen), where the disciple asks where the puagæ come from, and the master replies they are nothing but devils (fallen angels) in the murky air. (Given in English by Eichberg, citing Lebech 1968, p. 5 for noting this attestation.).) descended from Old Norse puki púke, meaning kobold (cf. Indo-European beu- → swelling) or from Low German pogge, meaning “toad”. Similarly, in Northern Schleswig (part of Denmark), Pug or Pog means “toad” or “frog”., also in the Danish language of Anglia, where it can mean Danish Skrubtudse (→Common toad) Another possibility is Danish pusling, meaning “fat, swollen”, thus giving rise to the meaning “something swollen, hunchbacked”. Puk is also said to mean “small, not grown up”.

The variant form nissebuk has encouraged the derivation of puk from buk ("buck goat or ram"), but this has been dismissed as folk etymology, though a commentator was tempted to comment it could echo a hint that the puk could shapeshift into a billy goat or ram. (Cf. also gaardbuk, husbuk as synonyms for nisse.)

It is possible that German Puk and English Puck have the same origin in continental Europe.

== Appearance and abilities ==
According to belief in Schleswig, Niß Puk is as tall as a child, either a one-year-old, one-and-a-half-year old but never taller than a three-year-old. It has a big head and long arms. Its eyes are said to be small, bright, and smart. It wears red stockings, a long ticking jacket, either grey or green, and a pointed red cap on its head. It also likes soft slippers with which it can be heard shuffling rapidly at night. Niß Puck is able to cover huge distances in the shortest time with the help of its slippers.

The Puken or Pücken on the Frisian island of Föhr are said to be small but broad, stout, and incredibly strong. They have big eyes with which they look around sharply. The Puken are dressed in red trousers, a grey waistcoat, and a red pointed cap as well as big, soft slippers. The Puk is said to have very large eyes on the island of Sylt, too.

The Nispuk is a little boy with a red cap and the Niskepuk is only three inches tall whereas the Neß Puk is a little man as tall as a span is long, wearing a pointed red cap. The cap of the Niß, when worn, makes its wearer invisible.

On the island of Rügen and in the Neumark, the Puck is dressed in red. The Pûks from Pomerania is a little manikin wearing a big hat brimmed upwards and a red coat with seven shiny buttons on each side. Otherwise, it is also described wearing a red jacket and a red cap.

On the island of Rügen, the Puk can have diverse appearances. At home it appears as a little boy with red jacket and red cap. Outside it takes the shape of a cat or a fiery dragon (i.e. Drak) but preferably as a cat, for cats can get in and out everywhere, even fitting through the smallest of openings.

The Niß Pug is very strong. It is further said that one Pûks can work as much as seven men.

In Pomerania, the Puk might be inseparable from its owner. If its owner is riding out, it is sitting on the horse next to the saddled horse, riding the horse in such a manner that it ends up completely gaunt. It works together with its owner and in the case it is given no work it will torment its owner by beating him, pulling his hair or ears and riding on his back until he ends up completely pale. During mealtime, too, the Puk is with its owner, sitting behind him on the chair and eating from the same bowl. It will eat faster than even the fastest human eater and soil its owner's food if it is sated, thus forcing him to stop eating.

== How to get one ==
When a Nis Puk wishes to dwell somewhere, it then gathers a heap of chippings and fills the milk barrels with milk, soiling them with cattle dirt. This is a test. When the people of the house take care to leave the heap of chippings as is and drink the milk despite its barrel being dirtied, then the Nis Puk will stay.

If a possible dwelling place for the Niskepuks, as they are known in North Frisia, is prepared, they are invited with the words “Nu quad jem, glad Niskepuks” (“Now come, dear Niskepuks” in North Frisian language). The Niskepuks will come to the house, dance through it for inspection and one of them will stay.

A Niß mistreated by the previous house owners can be won over by new owners through placing a bowl with sweet porridge with butter on the hayloft every evening for eight days (and every day afterwards) and giving it soft slippers on the ninth day. Afterwards, one can move in.

The Nispuk can be bought but it demands for its owner's soul after his death. It can be sold twice. Its first and second owners thus will not go to hell but its third owner will have to, for he cannot get rid of it.

In Pomerania, a Puk can be won from a small egg laid by seven-year-old cock by carrying it in one's armpit until it hatches. It must be observed that in this span of time one mustn’t talk nor laugh. Similarly, on the island of Rügen, an evil Puk will hatch from a black hen's egg laid at midnight when bred by man.

== Dwelling ==
Nispuk dwells in the loft, entering and exiting through a room forbidden for all where there is a window without glass.

The Puken or Pücken of the island of Föhr preferably dwell in the cellar and the loft, especially in small space between roof and straw, or in a small room with a doorknob shaped like a Puk-head.

The Nisken dwell in dark hidden corners of the house or barn, often also in the wood pile. They vanish if somebody comes near.

Niskepuk likes to dwell in a wooden pillar's hole if a board is fastened next to it where a bowl with porridge containing plenty of butter can be placed every day.

The Pûkse of Pomerania preferably dwell in beams, frames and other woodwork inside the house, which is the reason why the woodwork should be reused when renovating or building anew. The Pûks will move with its beams wherever they are built in, and with the Pûks the good luck will move, too.

Nisebuk dwells in a hole in the wall, as big as a brick, while Neß Puk dwells in a little box which is kept in a locked cupboard.

The Pûks in Bossin in Pomerania dwelt in the reeds of a waterbody for many years. Then, one night, it left this place, built a fence around a farmer's farmstead and moved to a chamber on the same farm where the windows were always shuttered. The farmer became richer and richer due to the Pûks.

== Work ==
The chores done by a Niß Puk are often very similar. With a Niß Puk working, caring, feeding and sweeping, the cattle is already fed in the morning, the threshing floor is swept, and the corn to be threshed the same day gets thrown on the threshing floor and made ready the preceding night. Thus, where there is prosperity, Niß Puk is said to dwell or reign. In Schleswig, Nis Puck also guards the chicken against the polecat's thievery.

The North Frisian Niskepuk grooms the horses and cows, cleans the fodder cribs, sweeps the barn, and places straw for threshing, all before morning breaks. Thus the cattle will prosper, the cows will give plenty of milk, and the sheep will regularly drop three or four lambs.

It is good for the farmhands to be on the Niskepuk's good side. Then it might guard the stable door so the farmhand can go visit his sweetheart, beating anybody trying to open the stable door with a club save for the farmhand for whom it opens and closes by itself. The farmhand might also find his early work done when coming home or having slept in. The Niskepuk might even move to its favorite farmhand's place after the farmer's death. Disbelieving farmhands or those taunting the Niskepuk will never have success in life.

At night, the Nisebuk fills the cribs with oat, feeding horses and other cattle, slapping left and right the farmhand daring to go to the horses at night. It also fetches water and makes brooms for the maidservants, and when they rake the ash from the hearth in the morning, they will find a speciesthaler.

The infernal Nispuk will throw down a speciesthaler from the loft every morning. It also feeds the horses at night, them making a crunching sound as if biting on iron, and will slap left and right whoever dares to find out whatever the horses are actually eating.

In Pomerania, the Pûkse dwell in houses, particularly in mills, where they milk the cows, groom the horses, and work in the kitchen. The helpful Pûks can be heard clattering and hammering at night.

In Schleswig-Holstein, the Husniskens, Hausnischen, Husknechtkens or Hauspuken are known to feed well the cattle and horses on the farm where they dwell so that the animals prosper and grow fat. The necessary fodder they steal from their host's neighbors.

In North Frisia, Nische Puk or Nisch helps bringing home 500 to 600 loads of hay. In fact, the Puk is able to carry a full barn's worth of hay on its broad back, stealing it from the neighbors at night.

The Nisebok brings grain so that during threshing between every layer of rye straw there is a layer of pure rye grains.

According to lore from the island of Rügen, a Puk travelling outside is usually on its way to rob as much money as its owner might want and need. Rarely, it might bring its owner disgusting dirt instead.

The Pûks also steals linen forgotten at the washing place. It flies there shaped as a long fiery boom with a broad head. When found in the act of stealing, the Pûks can be driven away by exclaiming: “en schwînsdreck! en schwînsdreck!” (“a pig dirt! a pig dirt!” in Low German) but it will leave behind a terrible stench and the linen has to be washed very long to be free from it.

In Dunsum in North Frisia, the Puken are known to grind coffee or cradle the children, both done invisibly, but they might sing: “Wenn du mir nicht willst stricken das Wams, So will ich auch nicht mehr mahlen und wiegen.” (“If you don’t want to knit me a waistcoat, then I don’t want to grind or cradle anymore.”), thus hinting at a desired reward.

The Niß is also said to have served Faust in his endeavor to create the world's first nautical maps by steering him through the sea in a box of glass.

== Rewards ==
As reward for its services, the Niß Puk requests a bowl filled with sweet porridge, butter or milk placed at its spot. The Pomeranian Pûkse expect a bowl of milk, too.

In Schleswig, Nische Puk is always expecting to be rewarded with porridge containing butter in the evening as is the Nispuk, the latter additionally expecting to get its owner's soul after his death.

Besides the obligatory porridge with butter, the Puken or Pücken of the island of Föhr also like to be gifted soft woolen footwear and thick woolen waistcoats

Again in Schleswig, the mistress of the house places milk and bread inside the cupboard for the Nisebok. This happens during evening when there is no maidservant observing her. When going to town, the mistress of the house takes care to buy raisin bread for the Nisebok.

On the island of Rügen, the Puk receives a cake every New Year's Day. If it receives baked goods from New Year's Day, the Puk doesn't need any food the rest of the year. Otherwise it has to be fed during the whole year.

In the evening, the Nisken expect the open hearth to be cleaned and a small cauldron with clear water being placed there for their convenience.

== Enjoyment, mischief, and revenge ==
Nis Puk also likes to appear with a horrid look, endeavoring to scare the household staff which, if successful, makes it laugh out joyously.

The Pûks might be seen reading a book in the evening but it will vanish if somebody approaches. Further, the Puk can be heard rustling in the straw, piping and singing.

The Puk very much likes sunbathing while sitting in the gables' hatch. It might also grimace curiously for fun while stitting there. When people are outside while it is sitting in the hatch, it teases them by lifting soon one leg, soon the other leg and calling out: “Hier Puke een Been, hier Puke ander Been!” (“Here Puk's one leg, here Puk's other leg!” in Low German). Should a farmhand take the chance to get close to it from behind and bush it so it falls down, the Puk will take revenge. On the ground beneath, people will only find pot shards where it fell, though. This revenge usually takes place at night. The sleeping farmhand might be placed across an open well in jeopardy of falling inside in case of movement. In another case, the farmhand, sleeping in the same bed as a comrade taller than himself, was tortured by the Puk exclaiming “Nich liek!” (“Not alike!” in Low German) and pulling on the farmhand's hair and big toe in turns the whole night.

If the Puk is pushed down from the hatch and murder is attempted with threshing flails, it will plan to take revenge as well. Again, only pot shards can be found on the ground at the spot of the attempt.

Similarly, the Niß likes to sit in the loft's hatch in the sunshine, swinging its legs and propping up its head with its hands. It might also tease the poodle by lifting its legs in turn. A farmhand who then dares to throw the Niß to the barking poodle with a pitchfork will feel the Niß's revenge. Either the Niß might take the farmhand's brand-new boots and walk in them all night until heels and soles re worn down or it might fold the ladder just when the farmhand is carrying grain to the loft, making him fall and break his legs.

In Schleswig, once the butter was hidden deep inside Nische Puk's porridge. Believing that there was no butter, Nisch flew in a rage and wrung the neck of the grey cow. Later it found the butter in the porridge and was angry at its own rashness. Knowing that there was a cow looking the same on another farm, Nische Puk took the dead cow by its horns, carrying it on its back over there to switch it for the live one. The same is said for Puk, only that it specifically wrings the neck of the best cow in the stable.

When mistreated, the Puken or Pücken of the island of Föhr might invisibly steal the butter out of the porridge eaten by the inhabitants of the house.

The Husniskens go away never to return when they are ridiculed, and they take the farm's good luck with them. When they are angry, the Hausnischen make a terrible racket at night thus keeping people from sleeping, breaking household goods, and throwing stones.

When being chased, the Niß might take revenge by making the henhouse crow and making a racket before sunrise, pinching the sleeping master of the house at his nose or big toe, and by making wild the cattle in the stable at night so that they hang themselves in their chains.

In Husum in North Frisia, sometimes whole crowds and families of Puke dwell in houses, throwing everything around at night, making a racket in the loft, running up and down the stairs and through all rooms or cellars, and stealing both flour and beer. When chased, they hide in the smallest cracks, they themselves being as tiny as spiders and worms, crying relentlessly from there. Those Puke do not take revenge. They are malicious in the first place.

== How to get rid of one ==
When a Nis becomes unbearable, moving away is a possible option but it might travel to the new place while hidden in the broom. Similarly, the Puk might be sitting behind on the last wagon travelling to the humans’ new domicile.

A different outcome is given when moving houses is thought of as the last possible solution to escape the awful Puke of Husum. They also might sit in the broom shouting with fine voices: “Wir ziehen um!” (“We are moving!”). To get rid of the Puke, the brooms must be left stuck deep in a pond. There they will stay and kill off the fish, exclaiming in the evening with fine voices: “Wir sind ausgezogen! Wir sind ausgewandert!” (“We have moved! We have emigrated!”).

It is further possible to get rid of the Puk the following way: In Pomerania, the owner should not give her true name to the Puk but call herself Sülstdan (“Self-done” in Low German). Then she can cook a cauldron of gruel to throw the Puk inside. The lamenting Puk, when asked who did this, will answer Sülstdan, i.e. self-done, and thus will be left to die in the hot gruel by its prospective rescuers.

== Interactions with its own kind ==
The Niß Puk is usually solitary and only one can be found per farm.

Once, there was a lack of fodder at the end of winter in Schleswig. A Pug had the idea to steal hay from a neighboring farm and thus went out at night, carrying heaps of hay on its back. On its way back, this Pug met the Pug belonging to the farm it had stolen from, finding out that that Pug had stolen hay in its, the first Pug's farm. Seeing that they had stolen from each other, the Pugs became enraged and beat each other all night long until dawn, leaving behind huge heaps of hay at daybreak.

In Sundeved in Northern Schleswig (today part of Denmark), many people are said to have a Pug. Those Puge bring their owners grain, fodder, and other things at night. When meeting each other, they might repeatedly into each other until daybreak, once leaving behind four bushels worth of threshed oat.

In Northern Schleswig, the Puge are dwarves. Similar to dwarves, the Puke or Puks might also hold a bridal procession right through a farmer's rooms and kitchen leading to the Hauspuk's usual dwelling. The bridal procession is described as follows: Up front there is the bride and bridegroom, both of them well-dressed, followed by pairs of little Puks, the elderly Hauspuk alone at the procession's end, giving out wood shavings turning to gold to people able to see their kind.
