= Nisse (folklore) =

Nordic mythological creature

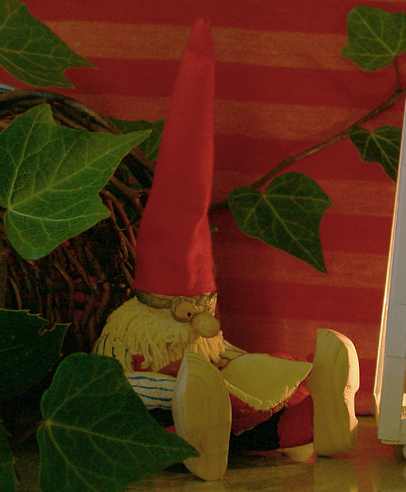
A tomtenisse made of salt dough. A common Scandinavian Christmas decoration, 2004.

A nisse (Danish: [ˈne̝sə], Norwegian: [ˈnɪ̂sːə]), tomte (Swedish: [ˈtɔ̂mːtɛ]), tomtenisse, or tonttu (Finnish: [ˈtontːu]) is a household spirit from Nordic folklore which has always been described as a small human-like creature wearing a red cap and gray clothing, doing house and stable chores, and expecting to be rewarded at least once a year around winter solstice (yuletide), with the gift of its favorite food, porridge.

Although there are several suggested etymologies, nisse may derive from the given name Niels or Nicholas, introduced 15–17th century (or earlier in medieval times according to some), hence nisse is cognate to Saint Nicholas and related to the Saint Nicholas Day gift giver to children. In the 19th century the Scandinavian nisse became increasingly associated with the Christmas season and Christmas gift giving, its pictorial depiction strongly influenced by American Santa Claus in some opinion, evolving into the Julenisse.

The nisse is one of the most familiar creatures of Scandinavian folklore, and he has appeared in many works of Scandinavian literature.

The nisse is frequently introduced to English readership as an "elf" or "gnome"; the Christmas nisse often bears resemblance to the garden gnome.

== Nomenclature ==
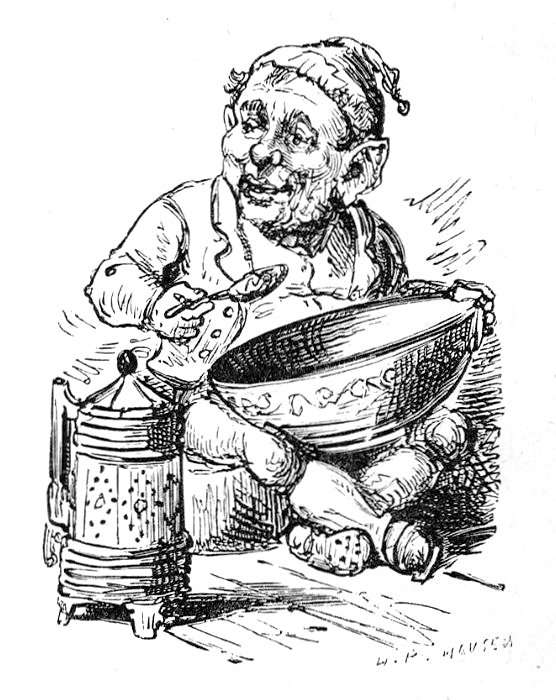
A nisse eating Christmas porridge.
A beer stein beside it.
―Illustration by Vincent Stoltenberg Lerche.

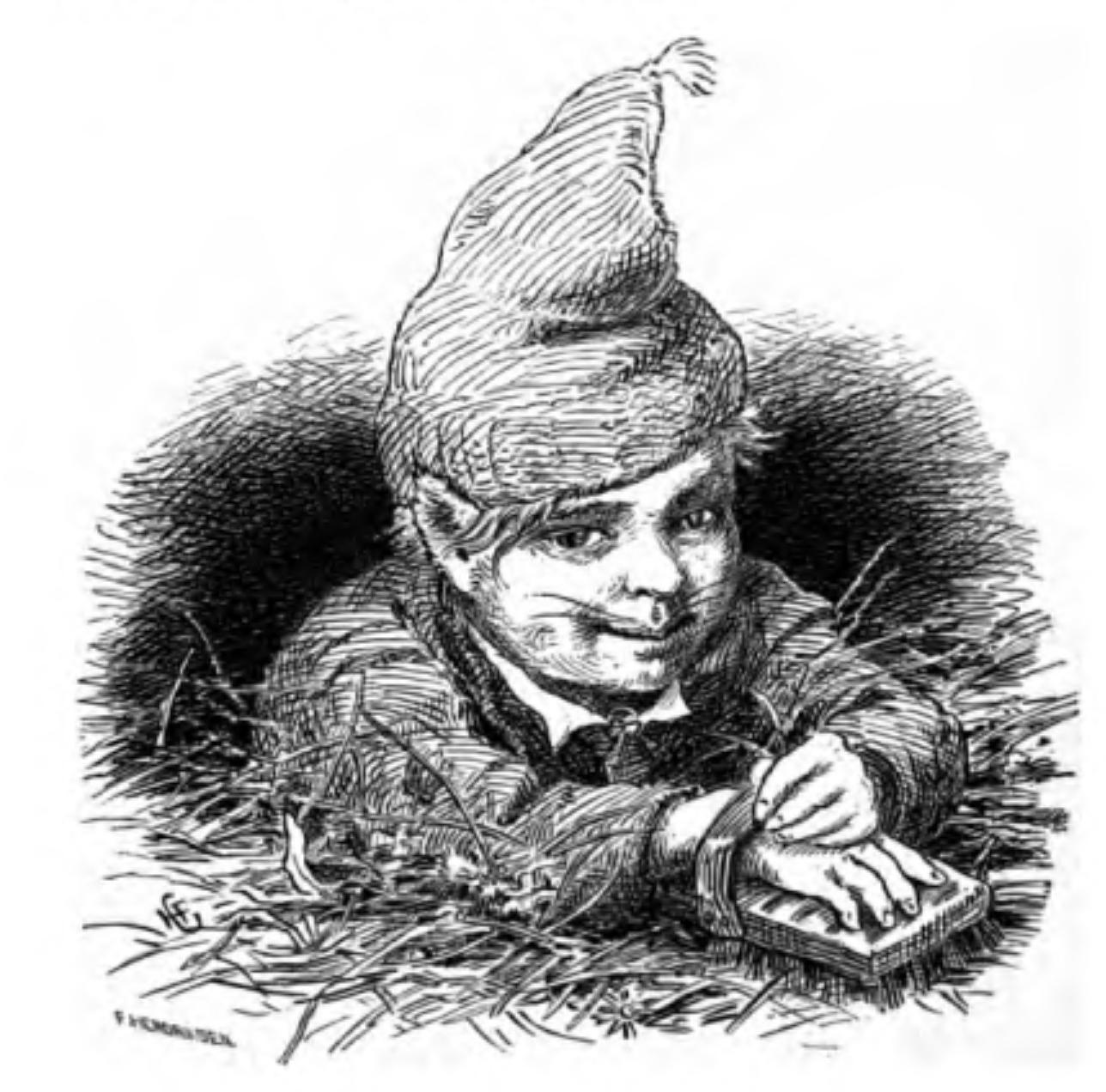
A nisse as stable-boy.
―Illustration by Hans Gude. Asbjørnsen (1896) Norske Folke- og Huldre-Eventyr

The word nisse (plural nisser) is a pan-Scandinavian term. Its modern usage in Norway into the 19th century is evidenced in Asbjørnsen's collection. The Norwegian tufte is also equated to nisse or tomte. In Danish the form husnisse ("house nisse") also occurs.

Other synonyms include the Swedish names tomtenisse and tomtekarl (cf. § Additional synonyms). The names tomtegubbe and tomtebonde ("tomte farmer") have occurred in Sweden and parts of Norway close to Sweden. The Finnish tonttu is borrowed from Swedish (cf. § Etymology), but the Finnish spirit has gained a distinct identity and is no longer synonymous. There is also the tonttu-ukko (lit. "house lot man") but this is a literary Christmas elf.

There are also localized appellations, in and tuftekall in Gudbrandsdalen and Nordland regions of Norway (cf. § Dialects).

Other variants include the Swedish names tomtenisse and tomtekarl; also in Sweden (and Norwegian regions proximate to Sweden) tomtegubbe and tomtebonde ("tomte farmer"), (cf. § Additional synonyms) and § Near synonyms (haugkall. "mound man", etc.).

=== English translations ===
The term nisse in the native Norwegian is retained in Pat Shaw Iversen's English translation (1960), appended with the parenthetical remark that it is a household spirit.

Various English language publications also introduce the nisse as an "elf" or "gnome". (Note: e.g., Crump's Christmas Encyclopedia (2022).) (Note: As a point of reference, the 19th century Norwegian linguist Knud Knudsen glosses the "gnome" in the vaguest sense has been glossed variously as nisse or vaette (wight), tus (giant).)

In the past, H. L. Braekstad (1881) chose to substitute nisse with "brownie". Brynildsen's dictionary (1927) glossed nisse as 'goblin' or 'hobgoblin'.

In the English editions of the Hans Christian Andersen's fairy tales the Danish word nisse has been translated as 'goblin', for example, in the tale "The Goblin at the Grocer's".

=== Dialects ===
Forms such as tufte have been seen as dialect. Aasen noted the variant form tuftekall to be prevalent in the Nordland and Trondheim areas of Norway, and the tale "Tuftefolket på Sandflesa" published by Asbjørnsen is localized in Træna Municipality in Nordland. (Note: The tale "Tuftefolket på Sandflesa" describes its setting as Trena, and Sandflesa is explained as a shifting bank off its shore.) Another synonym is tunkall ("yard fellow") also found in the north and west.

Thus ostensibly tomte prevails in eastern Norway (and adjoining Sweden), although there are caveats attached to such over-generalizations by linguist Oddrun Grønvik. (Note: Grønvik, Oddrun (1997), p. 154, summarized in English in Linguistics and Language Behavior Abstracts (1998).) (Note: She specifically addresses the generalization "tufte (-kall) har utbreeinga si noko nord- og vestafor tomte (-gubbe)," i.e., tufte(-kall) being in use to the north and west of regions where tomte(-gubbe) is prevalent, and states there is too scanty a material ("lite tilfang") to build on. Her study concludes that in general, current literature "does not give an accurate picture of their distribution [i.e., of the geographical distribution of the usage of varying terms for nisse] in the 19th century".) It might also be conceded that tomte is more a Swedish term than Norwegian. In Scania, Halland and Blekinge within Sweden, the tomte or nisse is also known as goanisse (i.e godnisse, goenisse 'good nisse'). (Note: The tomte (tomtar) is also called the nisse (plural: nissar) [in Blekinge].)

Reidar Thoralf Christiansen remarked that the "belief in the nisse is confined to the south and east" of Norway, and theorized the nisse was introduced to Norway (from Denmark) in the 17th century, but there is already mention of "Nisse pugen" in a Norwegian legal tract c. 1600 or earlier, (Note: Not inconsistent with Falk and Torp's etymological dictionary dating the introduction into Scandinavia (from Germany) to have occurred in the post-Reformation era.) and Emil Birkeli (1938) believed the introduction to be as early as 13 to 14c. The Norsk Allkunnebok encyclopedia states less precisely that nisse was introduced from Denmark relatively late, whereas native names found in Norway such as tomte, tomtegubbe, tufte, tuftekall, gardvord, etc., date much earlier.

=== Etymology ===
It has repeatedly been conjectured that nisse might be a variant of "nixie" or nix but detractors including Jacob Grimm note that a nixie is a water sprite and its proper Dano-Norwegian cognate would be nøkk, not nisse.

According to Grimm nisse was a form of Niels (or German: Niklas (Note: The name related to the etymology of nisse has several German forms besides Niklas, namely Nickel, Klaus, and in Austria Niklo.)), like various house sprites (Note: Chim (Joachim) and Has (Hans), German sprite names derived from human names, are given as synonymous to nisse by Falk&Torp.) that adopted human given names, (Note: With the period of "Nisse/Niels" type spirit name being introduced into Scandinavia falling in either c. 13/14th century, or the 16th, 17th century, as discussed above.) and was therefore cognate to St. Nicholas, and related to the Christmas gift-giver. (Note: Compare also English "Old Nick" for the name of the devil. The name Nickel is of course related to the etymology of the metal or element nickel.) Indeed, the common explanation in Denmark is that nisse is the diminutive form of Niels, as Danes in the 19th century used to refer to a nisse as "Lille Niels" or Niels Gårdbo (gårdbo, literally "yard/farmstead dweller" is also name for a sprite).

An alternate etymology derives nisse from Old Norse niðsi, meaning "dear little relative".

The tomte ("homestead man"), gardvord ("farm guardian"), and tunkall ("yard fellow") bear names that associated them with the farmstead. The Finnish tonttu is also borrowed from Swedish tomte, but "later tradition no longer consider these identical".

=== Additional synonyms ===
Faye also gives Dano-Norwegian forms toft-vætte or tomte-vætte. These are echoed by the Swedish vätte, Norwegian Nynorsk vette.

Norwegian gardvord (cf. vörðr) is a synonym for nisse, (Note: Or synonymous with tunkall, as Christiansen comments, but this concerns the tale "The Gardvord Beats up the Troll" collected by Ivar Aasen, and Aasen's dictionary glosses gardvord as 'nisse, vætte', as a thing believed to reside on the farm (Danish: gård).) or has become conflated with it. Likewise tunvord, "courtyard/farmstead guardian" is a synonym. Also the gårdbo ("farmyard-dweller"), (Note: Faye gives gardbo)

Other synonyms are Norwegian god bonde ("good farmer"), Danish god dreng ("good lad"). Also Danish gårdbuk ("farm buck") and husbuk ("housebuck") where buck could mean billygoat or ram. (Note: Mannhardt citing Grundtvig (1854), 1: 155, 126, 142.)

Regionally in Uppland Sweden is gårdsrå ("yard-spirit"), which being a rå often takes on a female form, which might relate to Western Norwegian garvor (gardvord).

In the confines of Klepsland in Evje og Hornnes Municipality in Setesdal, Norway, they spoke of fjøsnisse ("barn gnome").

==== Near synonyms ====
Some commentators have equated or closely connected the tomte/nisse to the haugbonde (<Old Norse: haubúi "mound dweller"). (Note: Kveldúlf Gundarsson (Stephan Grundy) citing Feilberg) (Note: Simpson (1994), p. 173 citing Andreas Faye (1833) Norske Sagn, pp. 42–45, though this seems wanting, except for "Haug børnene (mound children)" on p. 37).) However there is caution expressed by linguist Oddrun Grønvik against completely equating the tomte/nissse with the mound dwellers of lore, called the haugkall or haugebonde (from the Old Norse haugr 'mound'), although the latter has become indistinguishable with tuss, as evident from the form haugtuss. (Note: A different opinion comes from SF writer and academic Tor Åge Bringsværd who includes tusse among the synonyms for nisse.)

The haugbonde is said to be the ghost of the first inhabitant of the farmstead, he who cleared the tomt (house lot), who subsequently becomes its guardian. This haugbonde has also connected with the Danish/Norwegian tuntræt (modern spelling: tuntre, "farm tree") or in Swedish vårdträd ("ward tree") cult (Cf. § Origin theories).

Another near synonym is the drage-dukke, where dukke denotes a "dragger" or "drawer, puller" (of luck or goods delivered to the beneficiary human), which is distinguishable from a nisse since it is considered not to haunt a specific household.

== Origin theories ==
The story of propitiating a household deity for boons in Iceland occurs in the "Story of Þorvaldr Koðránsson the Far-Travelled" (Þorvalds þættur víðförla) and the Kristni saga where the 10th century figure attended to his father Koðrán giving up worship of the heathen idol (called ármaðr or 'year-man' in the saga: spámaðr or 'prophet' in the Þáttr) embodied in stone; this has been suggested as a precursor to the nisse in the monograph study by Henning Frederik Feilberg, though there are different opinions on what label or category should be applied to this spirit (e.g., alternatively as Old Norse landvættr "land spirit").

Feilberg argued that in Christianized medieval Denmark the puge (cog. Old Norse puki, German puk cf. Nis Puk; English puck) was the common name for the ancient pagan deities, regarded as devils or fallen angels. Whereas Feilberg here only drew a vague parallel between puge and nisse as nocturnally active, this puge or puk in medieval writings may be counted as the oldest documentation of nisse, by another name, according to Henning Eichberg. (Note: Eichberg takes an example from the medieval Lucidarius, Danish translated version, printed 1510. See Nis Puk.) But Claude Lecouteux handles puk or puge as distinct from niss[e].

Feilberg made the fine point of distinction that tomte actually meant a planned building site (where as tun was the plot with a house already built on it), so that the Swedish tomtegubbe, Norwegian tuftekall, tomtevætte, etc. originally denoted the jordvætten ("earth wights"). The thrust of Feilberg's argument considering the origins of the nisse was a combination of a nature spirit and an ancestral ghost (of the pioneer who cleared the land) guarding the family or particular plot. The nature spirits―i.e., tomtevætte ("site wights"), haugbue ("howe/mound dwellers"), "underground wights" (undervætte, underjordiske vætte), or dwarves, or vætte of the forests―originally freely moved around Nature, occasionally staying for short or long periods at people's homes, and these transitioned into house-wights (husvætte) that took up permanent residence at homes. In one tale, the sprite is called nisse but is encountered but by a tree stump (not in the house like a bona fide nisse), and this is given as an example of the folk-belief at its transitional stage. (Note: Tale localized at Rønnebæksholm outside Næstved. The nisse wore green clothes and a red hat.) (Note: However, the nisse living in the woods was not necessarily replaced or superseded. According to one source the Danes today still remember there is a separate wood nisse that wears green or brown, much smaller than the house nisse which wears gray.) But there is also the aspect of the ghost of the pioneer who first cleared the land, generally abiding in the woods or heaths he cleared, or seeking a place at the family hearth, eventually thought to outright dwelling in the home, taking interest in the welfare of the homestead, its crops, and the family members.

There are two 14th century Old Swedish attestations to the tomta gudhane "the gods of the building site". In the "Själinna thröst" ("Comfort of the Soul"), a woman sets the table after her meal for the deities, and if the offering is consumed, she is certain her livestock will be taken care of. In the Revelations of Saint Birgitta (Birgittas uppenbarelser), it is recorded that the priests forbade their congregation from providing offerings to the tompta gudhi or "tomte gods", apparently perceiving this to be competition to their entitlement to the tithe (Revelationes, book VI, ch. 78). (Note: Lecouteux, citing Liungman, Waldemar (1961) Das Rå und der Herr der Tiere.) (Note: In medieval Germany the household spirit schretlein or trut (Trud) was offered pairs of little red shoes, against Christian teachings, according to Martin von Amberg (c. 1350–1400).) There is not enough here to precisely narrow down the nature of the deity, whether it was land spirit (tomta rå) or a household spirit (gårdsrå).

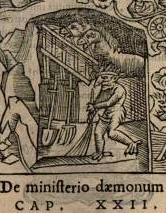
Dæmon or a tomte/nisse sweeping the stable with broom (Note: Detail of woodcut:. See this file for full view.)
—Olaus Magnus (1555)

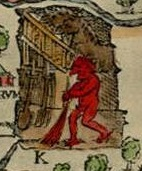
The dæmon on the colored map
—Olaus Magnus (1539) Carta Marina.

Several helper-demons were illustrated in the Swedish writer Olaus Magnus's 1555 work, including the center figure of a spiritual being laboring at a stable by night (cf. fig. right). It reprints the same stable-worker picture found on the map Carta Marina, B, k. The prose annotation to the map, Ain kurze Auslegung und Verklerung (1539) writes that these unnamed beings in the stables and mine-works were more prevalent in the pre-Christian period than the current time. The sector "B" of this map where the drawing occurs spanned Finnmark (under Norway) and West Lappland (under Sweden). While Olaus does not explicitly give the local vernacular (Scandinavian) names, the woodcuts probably represent the tomte or nisse according to modern commentators.

Later folklore says that a tomte is the soul of a slave during heathen times, placed in charge of the maintenance of the household's farmland and fields while the master was away on viking raids, and was duty-bound to continue until doomsday.

== Appearance ==
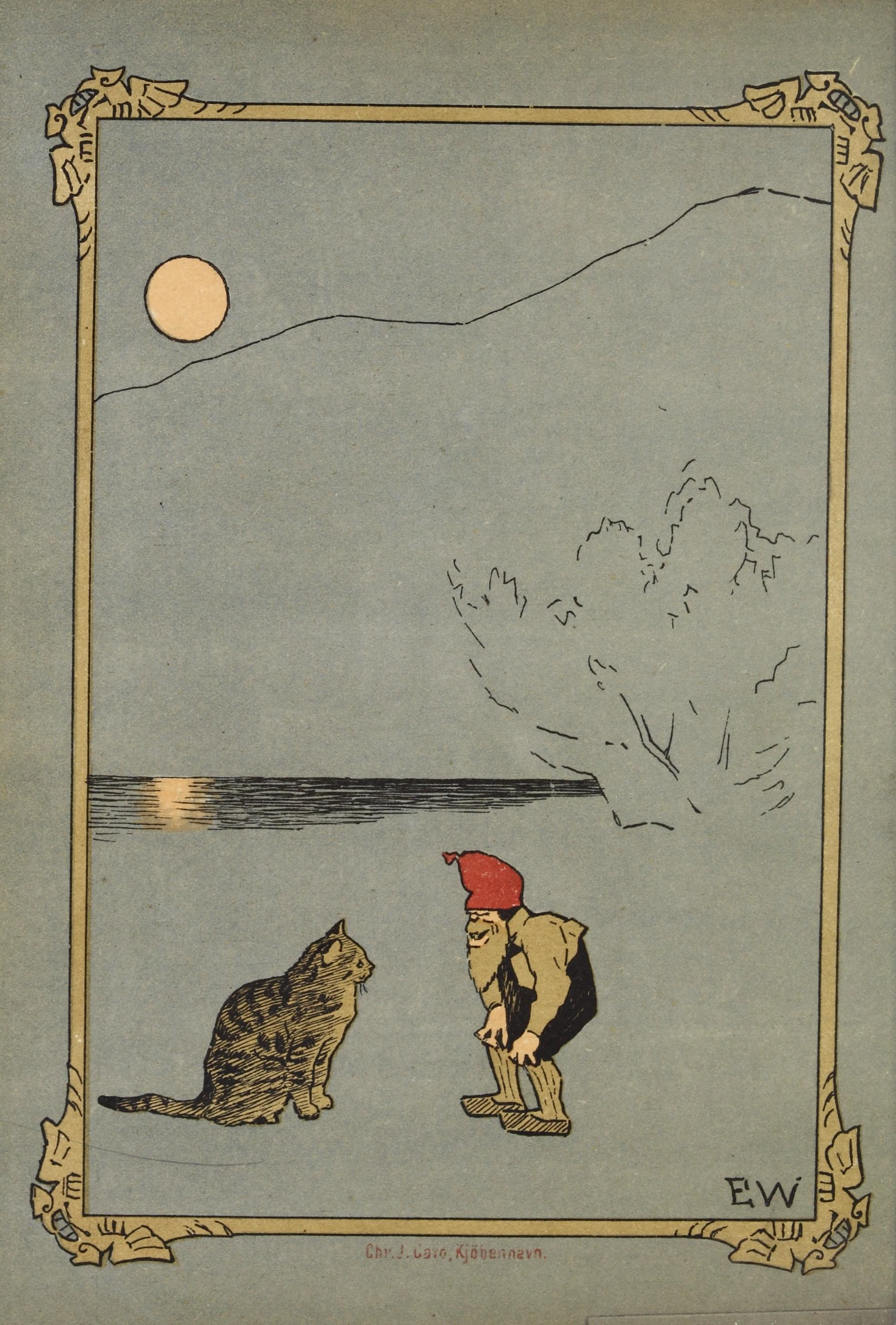
Nisse and cat. ―Erik Werenskiold, back cover of Asbjørnsen (1884) Eventyrbog for Børn

The Norwegian nisse was no bigger than a child, dressed in gray, wearing a red, pointy hat (pikhue = pikkelhue; a hue is a soft brimless hat) according to Faye.

In Denmark also, nisser are often seen as long bearded, wearing gray and a red brimless cap (hue). But the nisse turned bearded is an alteration, and the traditional purist nisse is beardless as a child, according to the book by Axel Olrik and Hans Ellekilde.

The tomte, according to Afzelius's description, was about the size of a one year-old child, but with an elderly wizened face, wearing a little red cap on his head and a gray (Note: Cf. Lecouteux's dictionary under "Niss": "In Sweden, an old bearded man wearing a red cap and gray clothing".) wadmal (coarse woolen) (Note: Original text: "Walmarsjackan", variant of "vadmal") jacket, short breeches, and ordinary shoes such as a peasant would wear. (Note: It is remarked that the tomte is outfitted in little gray jackets (not the blue-yellow national colors of Sweden), and the troll (trålen) sings: "Surn skall jag inför Ronungen gå /Som inte år klädd, utan bara i walmaret grå? [Sorely do I go forth to Ranungen / Who am clad in mere wadmal of gray]".) (Note: The knee breeches with stockings were still the common male dress in rural Scandinavia in the 17th, 18th, or 19th century.)

The tonttu of Finland was said to be one-eyed, (Note: Castrén (German tr.), translated into English by Macc da Cherda Whitley Stokes signeed Macc da Cherna.) and likewise in Swedish-speaking areas of Finland, hence the stock phrase "Enögd som tomten" (one-eyed like the tomten).

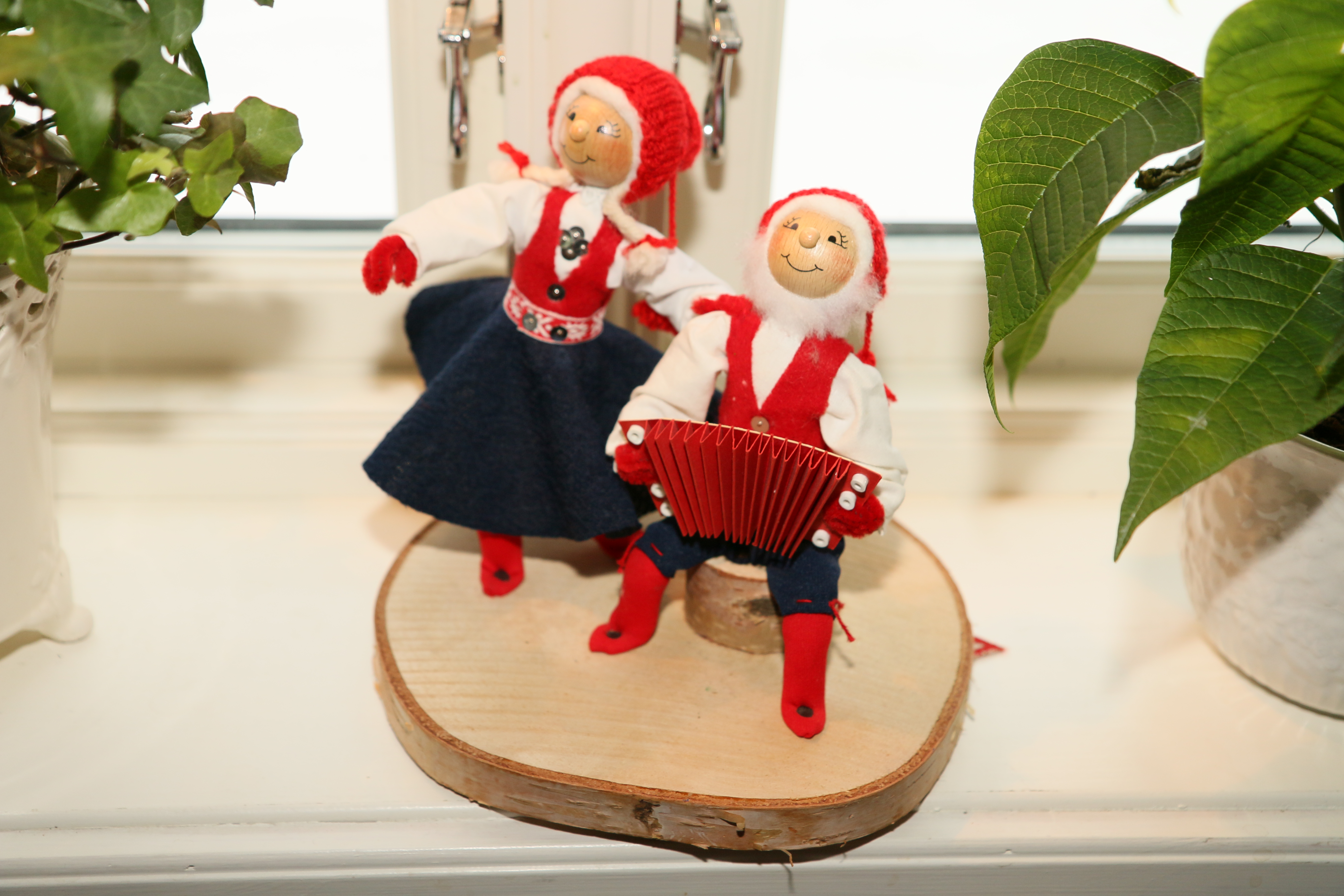
Nisser on a windowsill

The Tomte's height is anywhere from 60 cm (2 ft) to no taller than 90 cm (3 ft) according to one Swedish-American source, whereas the tomte (pl. tomtarna) were just 1 aln tall (an aln or Swedish ell being just shy of 60 cm or 2 ft), according to one local Swedish tradition. (Note: While a gaste was 2 alnar tall.)

=== Shapeshifter ===
The nisse may be held to have the ability to transform into animals such as the buck-goat. horse, or a goose.

In one tale localized at Oxholm, the nisse (here called the gaardbuk) falsely announces a cow birthing to the girl assigned to care for it, then tricks her by changing into the shape of a calf. She stuck him with a pitchfork which the sprite counted as three blows (per each prong), and avenged the girl by making her lie precarious on a plank on the barn's ridge while she was sleeping. (Note: Craigie, note, p. 434 writes that a cognate tale involving a lad occurs in Thiele, (II, 270) and translated by Keightley (1828): "The Nis and the Mare",1: 233–232, but is lacking the cause (the nis performing a prank such as transforming), and only the general motif of the lad hitting with a "dung fork" and getting revenge is paralleled.)

== Offerings ==
For the various benefits the nisse provided for his host family (which will be elaborated below under § As helpers), the family was expected to reward the sprite usually with porridge (subsection § Porridge-lover below). Even in the mid-19th century, there were still Christian men who made offerings to the tomtar spirit on Christmas day. The offering (called gifwa dem lön or "give them a reward") used to be pieces of wadmal (coarse wool), tobacco, and a shovelful of dirt.

=== Porridge-lover ===
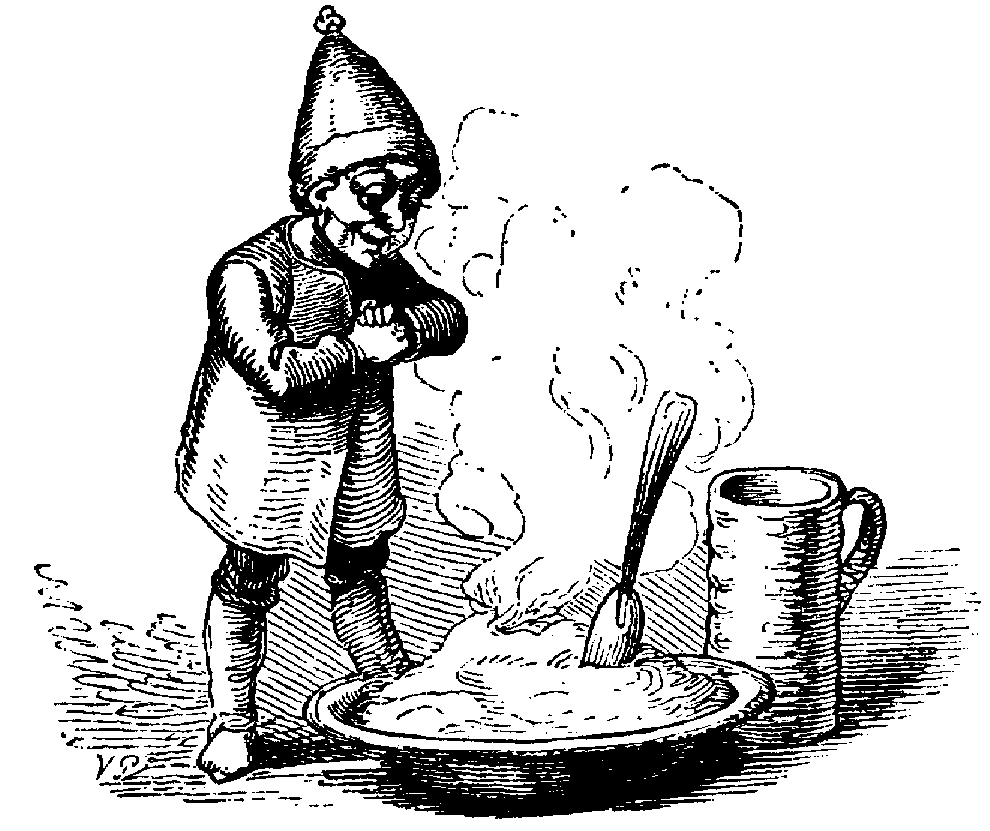
A nisse receiving his porridge. ―Vilhelm Pedersen, illustration for Andersen (1853) Nissen hos Spækhøkeren [The Goblin at the Grocer's]

One is also expected to please nisse with gifts (cf. Blót). A traditional gift is a bowl of porridge on Christmas Eve. The nisse was easily angered over the porridge offering. It was not only a servant who ate up the porridge meant for the sprite that incurred its wrath, but the nisse was so fastidious that if it was not prepared or presented correctly using butter, he still got angry enough to retaliate. Cf. also § Wrath and retribution.

The Norwegian household, in order to gain favor of the nisse, sets out the Christmas Eve and Thursday evenings meal for it under a sort of catwalks (of the barn) (Note: The original text reads "under Lovebroen", where løbebro is defined as the "narrow, temporary footbridge or passage, e.g. in the form of a ladder that forms a connection in a scaffold", though Thrope (and Craigie) do not translated this out and merely give "in many places". It is implicit this is part of a barn; the girl who mockingly brought food was found dead in the barn.) (Note: According to Faye, the Norwegian girl brought the Christmas porridge mockingly, and after he danced with her, she was found lying dead in the barn (the original "sprængt" appears to mean "exploded, blown to bits").) The meal consisted of sweet porridge, cake, beer, etc. But the sprite was very picky about the taste. Some (later) authorities specified that it is the rømmegrøt (var. rømmegraut, "sour cream porridge", using wheat flour and/or semolina) should be the treat to serve the Norwegian nisse. While the rommegrøt still remained the traditional Christmas treat for Norwegian-Americans as of year 2000, Norwegian taste has shifted to preferring rice pudding (Norwegian: risengrynsgrøt, risgrøt) for Christmas, and has taken to serving it to the supposed julenisse.

The nisse likes his porridge with a pat of butter on the top. In a tale that is often retold, a farmer put the butter underneath the porridge. When the nisse of his farmstead found that the butter was missing, he was filled with rage and killed the cow resting in the barn. But, as he thus became hungry, he went back to his porridge and ate it, and so found the butter at the bottom of the bowl. Full of grief, he then hurried to search the lands to find another farmer with an identical cow, and replaced the former with the latter. (Note: Also Danish versions recorded as #181 and #182 in Kristensen (1893), p. 88, with #182 quoted in English translation by Tangherlini (2015) [1994]: here, after the killed cow, stones and sticks start banging against the wall because the nisse wished the newly replaced cow to behave like the old.)

In a Norwegian tale, (Note: localized in Hallingdal, Norway.) a maid decided to eat the porridge herself, and ended up severely beaten by the nisse. It sang the words: "Since you have eaten up the porridge for the tomte (nisse), you shall with the tomte have to dance!" (Note: Reads "tomten" instead of "nissen" in the original Norwegian, and the two lines are repeated again in a refrain.) The farmer found her nearly lifeless the morning after. In a Northern Danish variant, the girl behaves more appallingly, not only devouring the beer and porridge, but peeing in the mug and doing her business (i.e., defecating) in the bowl. The nisse leaves her lying on a slab above the well. The motif occurs in Swedish-speaking Finland with certain twists. In one version, the servant eats the tomte's porridge and milk to bring his master to grief, who winds up having to sell the homestead when the sprite leaves. And in the legend from Nyland (Uusimaa) (Note: Rankila in Nyland is named) it decides the rivalry between neighbor the Bäckars and the Smeds, the boy from the first family regains the tomte lost to the other family by intercepting the offering of milk and porridge, eating it, and defiled it in "shameful manner". The tomte returning from the labor of carrying seven bales of rye exclaimed some words and reverted to the old family.

In Sweden, the Christmas porridge or gruel (julgröt) was traditionally placed on the corner of the cottage-house, or the grain-barn (lode), the barn, or stable; and in Finland the porridge was also put out on the grain-kiln (rin) or sauna. This gruel is preferably offered with butter or honey. This is basically the annual salary to the spirit who is being hired as "the broom for the whole year". If the household neglects the gift, the contract is broken, and the tomte may very well leave the farm or house.

According to one anecdote, a peasant used to put out food on the stove for the tomtar or nissar. When the priest inquired as to the fate of the food, the peasant replied that Satan collects it all in a kettle in hell, used to boil the souls for all eternity. The practice was halted. The bribe could also be bread, cheese, leftovers from the Christmas meal, or even clothing (cf. below). A piece of bread or cheese, placed under the turf, may suffice as the bribe to the tomtar/nissar ("good nisse") according to the folklore of Blekinge.

In Denmark, it is said that the nisse or nis puge (nis pug) particularly favors sweet buckwheat porridge (boghvedegrød), though in some telling it is just ordinary porridge or flour porridge that is requested. (Note: In Kristensen (1893), the Part "B. Nisser" is divided into sections, where "§11. Nissens grød (the nisse's porrdige)" collects legends No. 144– 150 pp. 78-60. No. 145, localized in Puggaard, Gørding Hundred tells of a nis pug wanting buckwheat porridge. No. 150 says the nisse favored buckwheat porridge but used the butter to fry souls (taken down from A. L., perhaps A. Ludvigsen?). No. 182 gives "buckwheat-groat-porridge" (bogetgrynsgrød, probably something like kasha-groat.)

=== Gift clothing ===
In certain areas of Sweden and Finland, the Christmas gift consisted of a set of clothing, a pair of mittens or a pair of shoes at a minimum. In Uppland (Skokloster parish), the folk generously offered a fur coat and a red cap such as was suitable for winter attire.

Conversely, the commonplace motif where the "House spirit leaves when gift of clothing is left for it" (Note: Stith-Thompson's motif index F405.11. "House spirit leaves when gift of clothing is left for it".) might be exhibited: According to one Swedish tale, a certain Danish woman (danneqwinna) noticed that her supply of meal she sifted seemed to last unusually long, although she kept consuming large amounts of it. But once when she happened to go to the shed, she spied through the keyhole or narrow crack in the door and saw the tomte in a shabby gray outfit sifting over the meal-tub (mjölkaret). So she made a new gray kirtle (kjortel) for him and left it hanging on the tub. The tomte wore it and was delighted, but then sang a ditty proclaiming he will do no more sifting as it may dirty his new clothes. (Note: In Amy Friedman's adaptation "The tomte's new suit", the family is worried about offending the tomte and causing it to leave, but ironically the gift of new clothing makes it go away.) A similar tale about a nisse grinding grain at the mill is localized at the farmstead of Vaker in Ringerike, Norway. It is widespread and has been assigned Migratory Legend index ML 7015.

== As helpers ==
According to tradition, the Norwegian (Note: Craigie (1896). "The Nisse [first part", pp. 189–190 (from Faye; cf. p. 434). Already discussed above on Faye and Thorpe tr., that it is implicit the Norwegian nisse lives in barn since food is brought to him there.) and Danish nisse lives in the barns of the farmstead; in Denmark, it is said the spirit starts out living in the church at first, but can be coaxed into moving to one's barn. A house-tomte dwelled in every home according to Swedish tradition, and it is emphasized the tomte is attached to the farmstead rather than the family. The tomte is regarded as dwelling under the floorboards of houses, stables, or barns. (Note: Though the household protective deity living under the floorboards" belief is claimed to go back to the pagan Viking Age, and in those former times presumably pan-Scandinavian.)

The nisse will beneficially serve those he likes or those he regards as friend, doing farm-work or stable chores such as stealing hay from the neighbor (Norwegian) or stealing grain (Danish). The Norwegian tusse (i.e. nisse) in a tale had stolen both fodder and food for its beneficiary. (Note: Christiansen (1964). "63. The Heavy Load", pp. 139–140; Kvideland & Sehmsdorf (1988) "48.3 The Heavy Burden", pp. 240–241. Bad Lavrans who dwelled at Meås, Seljord who didn't appreciate that a tusse had been stealing fodder and food from Bakken, and all the goods went back. Bakken does not appear as an actual place names, at leas where it is called bakken (i. e. "the hill") named "Bøkkerdalen" and the name of the principal human figure is spelt "Lafrantz", and the tusse (nisse) was carrying a large sack of corn when he was derided.) Similarly, the tomte, if treated well, will protect the family and animals from evil and misfortune, and may also aid the chores and farm work. But it has a short temper, especially when offended, (Note: "vindictive when any one slights or makes game of them.. Ridicule and contempt he cannot endure" (Faye, Thorpe tr.), "Scorn and contempt he cannot stand" (Craigie tr.)) and can cause life to be miserable. Once insulted, the tomte will resort to mischief, braiding up the tails of cattle, etc. or even kill the cow.

=== Harvesting ===
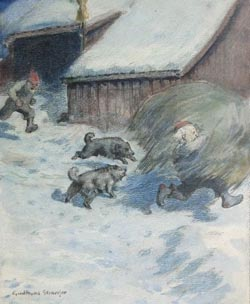
A nisse stealing hay from a farmer. ―Nisser med høy. Watercolor by Gudmund Stenersen (1863–1934)

In one anecdote, two Swedish neighboring farmers owned similar plots of land, the same quality of meadow and woodland, but one living in a red-colored, tarred house with well-kept walls and sturdy turf roof grew richer by the year, while the other living in a moss-covered house, whose bare walls rotted, and the roof leaked, grew poorer each year. Many would give opinion that the successful man had a tomte in his house. (Note: There is also anecdote localized at Brastad two farmers harvesting from the same field but the disparity in wealth develops due to one having a tomte.) The tomte may be seen heaving just a single straw or ear of corn with great effort, but a man who scoffed at the modest gain lost his tomte and his fortune foundered; a poor novice farmer valued each ear tomte brought, and prospered. A tusse in a Norwegian tale also reverses all the goods (both fodder and food) he had carried from elsewhere after being laughed at for huffing and heaving just a ear of barley.

=== Animal husbandry ===
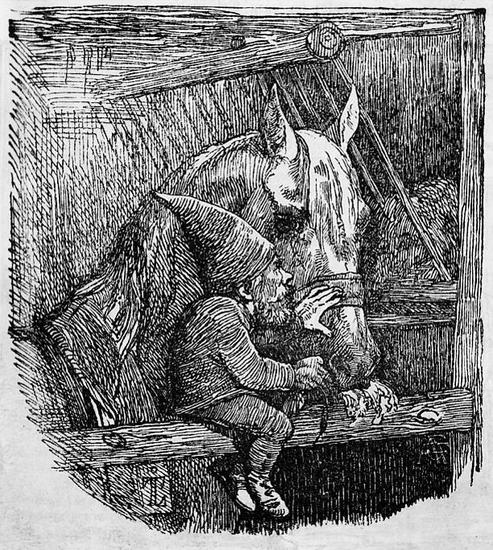
A nisse in the stable. ―Johan Thomas Lundbye, in Flinchs Almanak (1842)

The Norwegian nisse will gather hay, even stealing from neighbors to benefit the farmer he favors, often causing quarrels. He will also take the hay from the manger (Danish: krybbe) of other horses to feed his favorite. One of his pranks played on the milkmaid is to hold down the hay so firmly the girl is not able to extract it, and abruptly let go so she falls flat on her back; the pleased nisse then explodes into laughter. Another prank is to set the cows loose. There is also a Danish tale of the nisse stealing fodder for the livestock.

As the protector of the farm and caretaker of livestock, the tomte's retributions for bad practices range from small pranks like a hard strike to the ear to more severe punishment like killing of livestock.

The stable hand needed to remain punctual and feed the horse (or cattle) both at 4 in the morning and 10 at night, or risk being thrashed by the tomte upon entering the stable. Belief has it that one could see which horse was the tomte's favourite as it will be especially healthy and well taken care of. (Note: Cf. Simpson (1994) "The Tomte Hates the New Horse", p. 174, "The Tomte's Favourite Cow", p. 173)

The phenomenon of various "elves" (by various names) braiding "elflocks" on the manes of horses is widespread across Europe, but is also attributed to the Norwegian nisse, where it is called the "nisse-plaits" (nisseflette) or "tusse-plaits" (tusseflette), and taken as a good sign of the sprite's presence. Similar superstition regarding tomte (or nisse) is known to have been held in the Swedish-American community, with the taboo that the braid must be unraveled with fingers and never cut with scissors.

=== Carpentry ===
The tomte is also closely associated with carpentry. It is said that when the carpenters have taken their break from their work for a meal, the tomte could be seen working on the house with their little axes. It was also customary in Swedish weddings to have not just the priest but also a carpenter present, and he will work on the newlyweds' abode. Everyone then listens for the noises that the tomtegubbe helping out with the construction, which is a sign that the new household has been blessed with its presence.

== Wrath and retribution ==
The nisse's irritability and vindictiveness especially at being insulted has already been discussed. And its wrath cannot be taken lightly due to the nissen's immense strength despite their size. They are also easily offended by carelessness, lack of proper respect, and lazy farmers.

If displeased, the nisse may resort to mischiefs such as overturning buckets of milk (Note: Spilling milk is something a tomte might do also.), causing cream to sour, or causing the harness straps on horses to break.

If he is angered, he may leave the home, and take the good luck and fortune of the family with him, or be more vindictive, even as to kill someone. (Note: The example of the girl who mockingly served the porridge meal was killed or left looking "lifeless" ("exploded, broken to bits").)

Observance of traditions is thought to be important to the nisse, as they do not like changes in the way things are done at their farms. They are also easily offended by rudeness; farm workers swearing, urinating in the barns, or not treating the creatures well can frequently lead to a sound thrashing by the tomte/nisse. If anyone spills something on the floor in the nisse's house, it is considered proper to shout a warning to the tomte below.

=== Exorcism ===
Although the tomte (def. pl. tomtarna) were generally regarded as benevolent (compared to the rå or troll), some of the tales show church influence in likening the tomte to devils. Consequently, the stories about their expulsions are recounted as "exorcisms".

== Parallels ==
Any of the various household spirits across the world can be brought to comparison as a comparison to the nisse (cf. § See also). In English folklore, there are several beings similar to the nisse, such as the Scots and English brownie, Robin Goodfellow, and Northumbrian hob. (Note: Motif-Index F482. Brownie (nisse).) These plus the Scottish redcap, Irish clurichaun, various German household spirits such as Hödeken (Hütchen), Napfhans, Puk (cog. English puck), and so on and so forth are grouped together with the Scandinavian nisse or nisse-god-dreng ("good-lad") in similar lists compiled by T. Crofton Croker (1828) and William John Thoms (1828). Both name Spain's "duende", the latter claiming an exact match with the "Tomte Gubbe", explaining duende to be a contraction of "dueño de casa" meaning "master of the house" in Spanish (The duende lore has reached Latin America. cf. Little people (mythology) § Native American folklore).

As for subtypes, the nisse could also take a ship for his home, and be called skibsnisse, equivalent to German klabautermann, and Swedish skeppstomte. Also related is the Nis Puk, which is widespread in the area of Southern Jutland/Schleswig, in the Danish-German border area.

In Finland, the sauna has a saunatonttu.

== Modern Julenisse ==
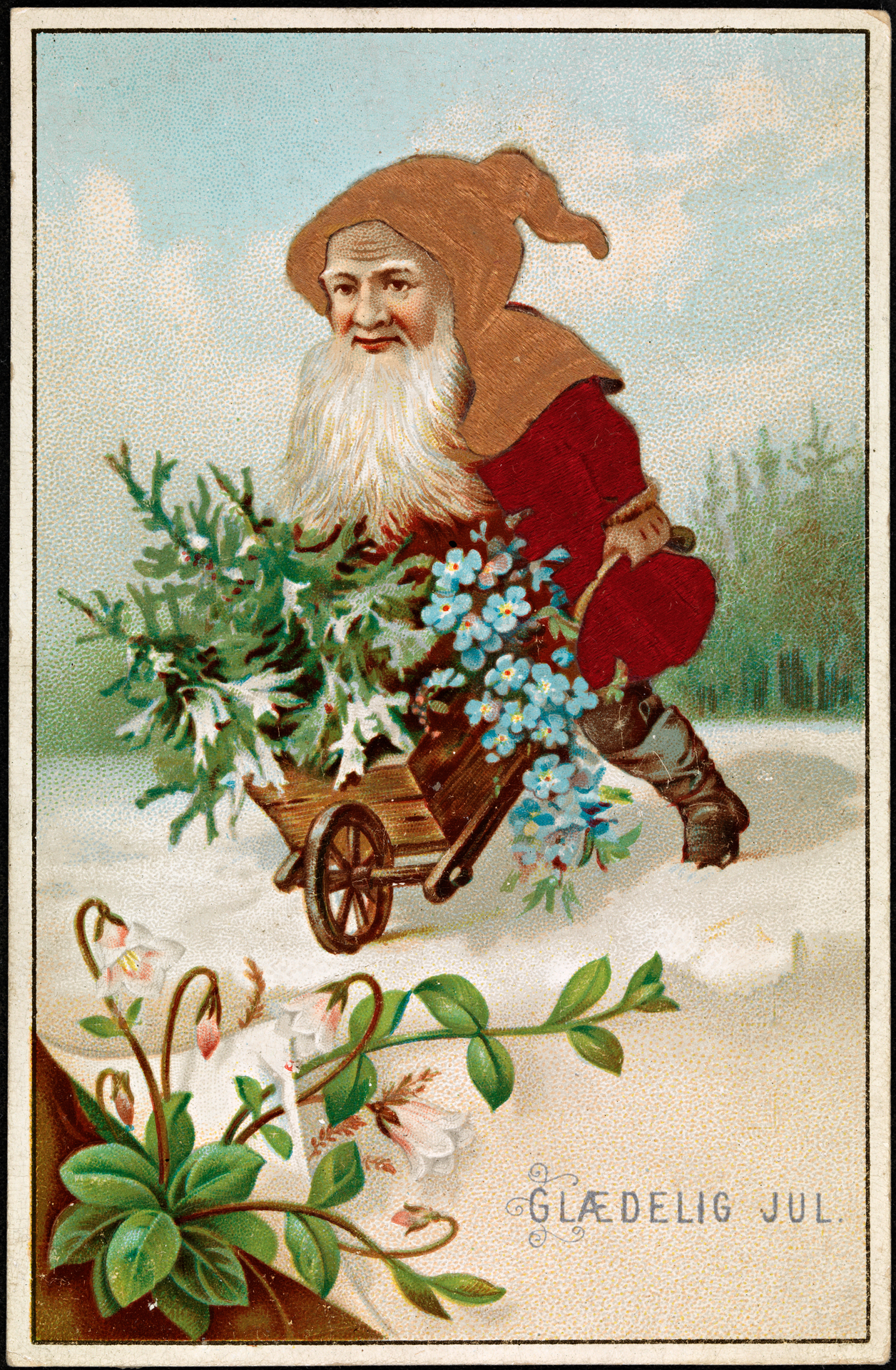
Nisse on Christmas Card (1885)

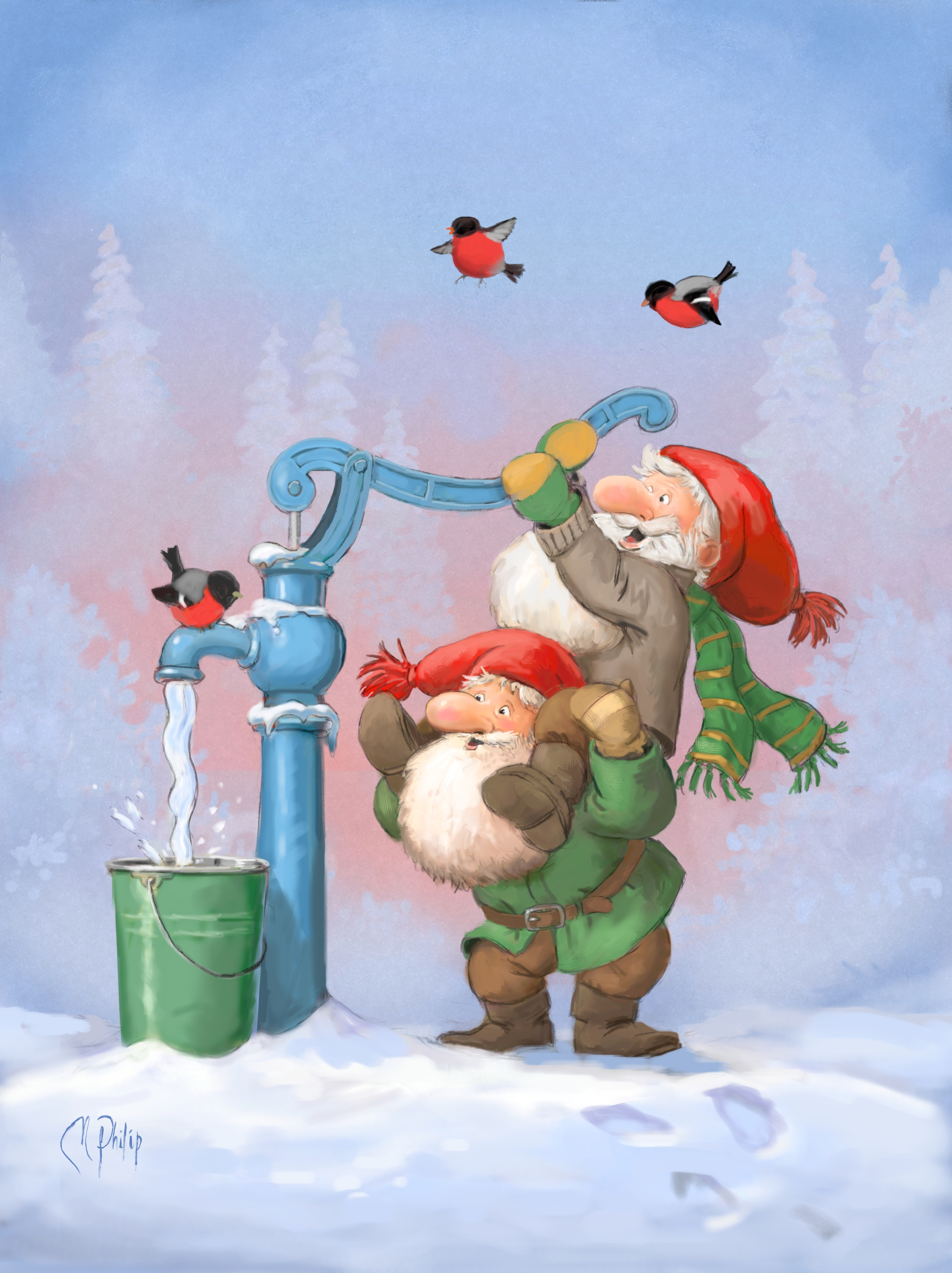
Swedish Christmas card featuring tomte

The household nisse/tomte later evolved into the Christmas Jultomte of Sweden and Julenisse of Denmark/Norway (Danish: Julenisserne, Norwegian: Julenissen). Likewise in Finland, where the joulutonttu of Christmas-tide developed rather late, based on the tonttu which had been introduced much earlier from Scandinavian (Swedish etc.) myth, and already attested in Finland in the writings of Mikael Agricola (16 cent.).

While the original "household spirit" was no "guest" and rather a house-haunter, the modern itinerant jultomte was a reinvention of the spirit as an annual visitor bearing gifts. He has also been transformed from a diminutive creature into an adult-size being. In Denmark, it was during the 1840s the farm's nisse became julenisser, the multiple-numbered bearers of Yuletide presents, through the artistic depictions of Lorenz Frølich (1840), Johan Thomas Lundbye (1845), and H. C. Ley (1849). Lundbye was one artist who frequently inserted his own cameo portraiture into his depictions of the nisse over the years (cf. fig. above).

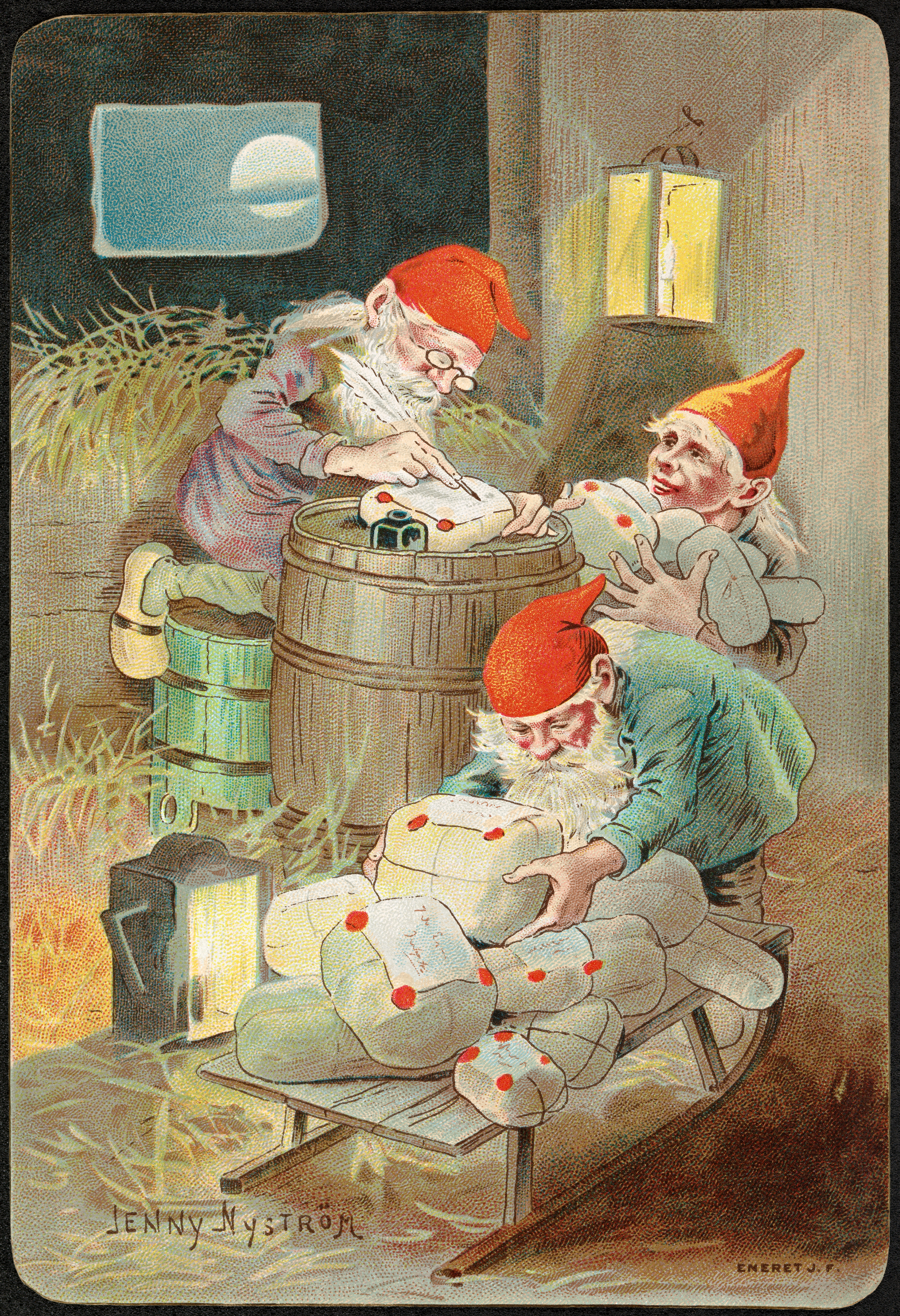
Swedish Christmas card by Jenny Nyström, circa 1899

The image shift in Sweden (to the white-bearded and red-capped) is generally credited to illustrator Jenny Nyström's 1881 depiction of the tomte accompanying Viktor Rydberg's poem "Tomten", (Note: In the poem, the tomte is alone awake in the cold Christmas night, pondering the mysteries of life and death.) first published in the Ny Illustrerad Tidning magazine She crafted the (facial) appearance of her tomte using her own father as her model, though she also extracted features from elderly Lappish men.

Carl Wilhelm von Sydow (1935?) charged that the make-over of the tomte came about through a misconception or confusion with English Christmas cards featuring a red-capped and bearded Santa Claus (Father Christmas) wearing a fur coat. Nyström squarely denied her depiction of the tomte had introduced adulterated foreign material, but she or others could have emulated Danish precursors like the aforementioned Hans Christian Ley in the 1850s, and it is said she did construct her image based on Swedish and Danish illustrations.

Herman Hofberg's anthology of Swedish folklore (1882), illustrated by Nyström and other artists, writes in the text that the tomte wears a "pointy red hat" ("spetsig röd mössa"). Nyström in 1884 began illustrating the tomte handing out Christmas presents.

Gradually, the commercialized version has made the Norwegian julenisse look more and more like the "roly-poly" American Santa Claus, compared with the thin and gaunt traditional version which has not entirely disappeared. The Danish julemand impersonated by the fake-bearded father of the family wearing gray kofte (glossed as a cardigan (sweater) or peasant's frock), red hat, black belt, and wooden shoes full of straw was relatively a new affair as of the early 20th century, and deviates from the traditional nisse in many ways, for instance, the nisse of old lore is beardless like a youth or child.

=== Julebock ===
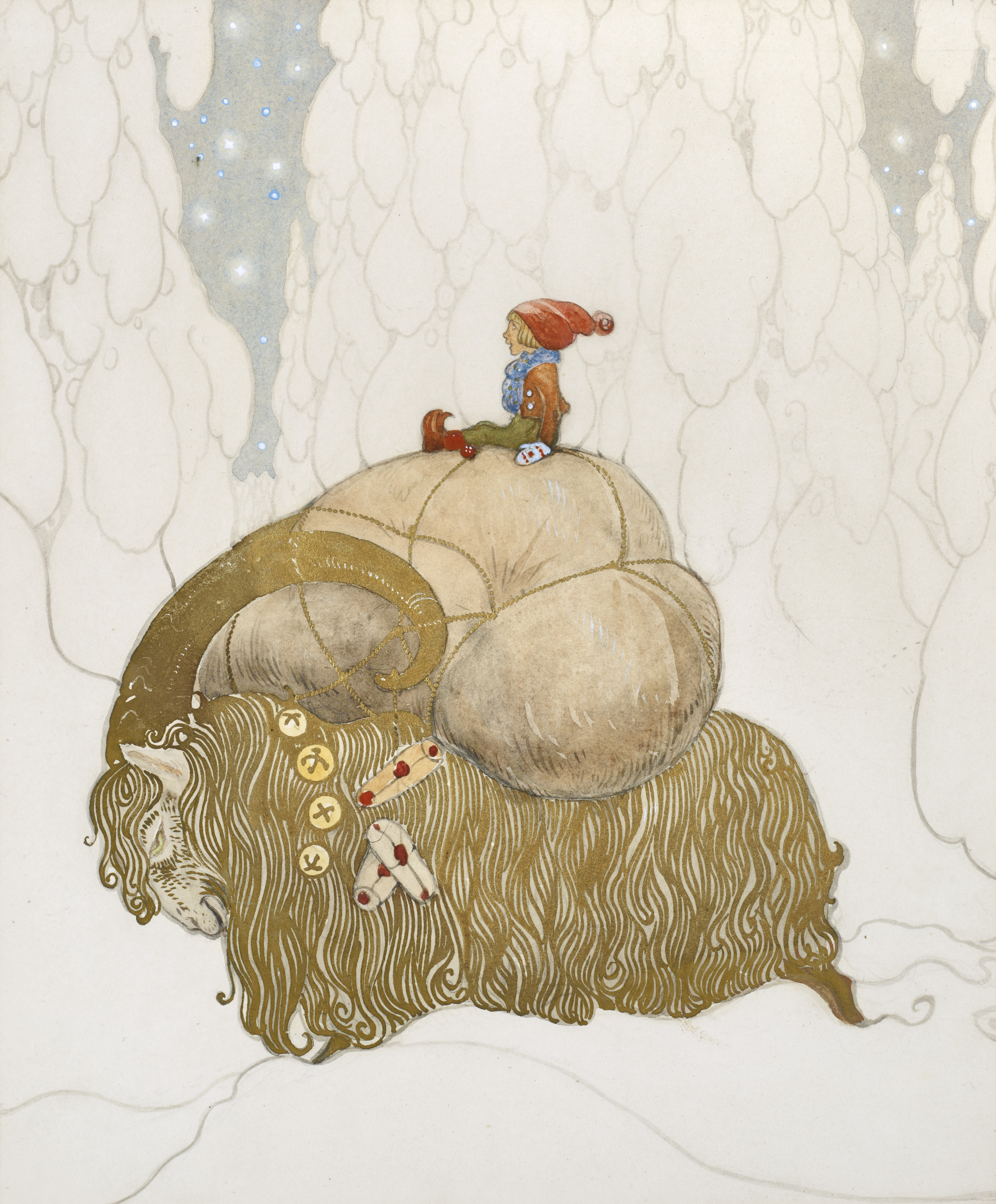
Julbocken by John Bauer (1912)

Also in Sweden, the forerunner Christmas gift-giver was the mythical Yule goat (Julbocken, cf. Julebukking) starting around the early 19th century, (Note: It is pointed out by Nilsson that there was no such Christmas gift giving custom in Sweden until the 18th century (or 19th century in many parts), and it had till then always been the New Year's Day gift-giving.) before the advent of the Jultomte. The julbock was either a prop (straw figure) or a person dressed as goat, equipped with horns, beard, etc. (Note: It had once gone out of style but the straw Yule goat made a revival around ca. 1920s.) The modern version of juletomte is a mixture of the traditional tomte combined with this Yule goat and Santa Claus.

In later celebrations of Christmas (cf. § Present-day), the julbock no longer took on the role as thus described, but as a sumpter beast, or rather, the animal or animals drawing the gift-loaded sleigh of the jultomte. (Note: Authentically in Sweden the juletomten's "sleigh loaded with gifts to reward all the good little children [was drawn by] no reindeer [but] hitched to it is a prancing team of goats".) Meanwhile some commentators have tried to link this Christmas goat with the pair of goats hitched to the god Þórr's chariot, which flies over the sky.

As for other animals, period Christmas cards also depict the julenisse in the company of a cat (mis) The juletomte of the Christmas card artist's imagination, is often paired with a horse or cat, or riding on a goat or in a sled pulled by a goat. The jultomte is also commonly depicted with a pig on Christmas cards.

=== Present-day ===
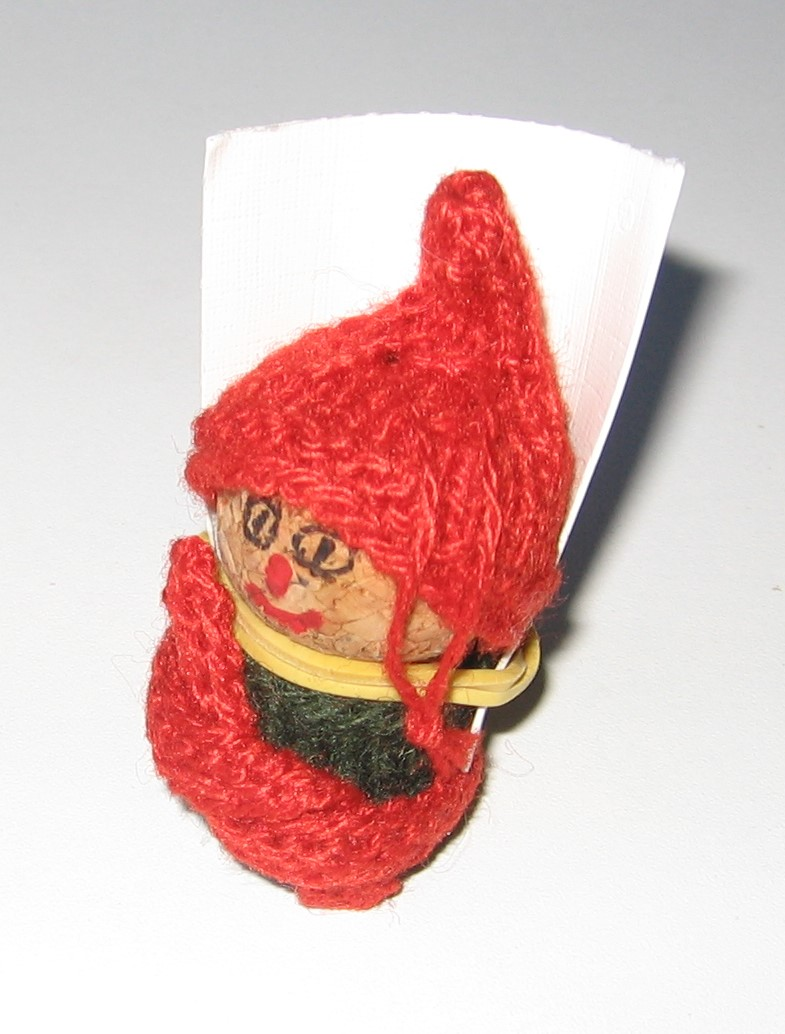
Little Swedish tomte homemade of cork and wool with a Christmas wish, December 2023

In the modern conception, the jultomte, Julenisse or Santa Claus, enacted by the father or uncle, etc., in disguise, will show up and deliver as Christmas gift-bringer. In Finland too, the Suomi version of Father Christmas will show up at the door bringing gifts to the children. After dinner, the children await the Jultomten or Julenisse to arrive (on a julbok-drawn sleigh), then ask them "Are there any good children here?" before passing out his gifts.

There are still a number of differences from the American Santa Claus myth. The Scandinavian Christmas nisse does not live at the North Pole, but perhaps in a forest nearby; the Danish julemand lives on Greenland, and the Finnish joulupukki (in Finland he is still called the Yule Goat, although his animal features have disappeared) lives in Lapland; he does not come down the chimney at night, but through the front door, delivering the presents directly to the children, just like the Yule Goat did.

== Modern adaptations ==
In Hans Christian Andersen's collection of fairy tales, the nisse appears in "The Goblin at the Grocer's" (Note: Nissen hos Spækhøkeren.) as aforementioned, as well as "The Goblin and the Woman" (Nissen og Madammen) and "Ole Lukøje"; the church nisse also appears in his short fantasy The Travelling Companion.

An angry tomte is featured in the popular children's book by Swedish author Selma Lagerlöf, Nils Holgerssons underbara resa genom Sverige (The Wonderful Adventures of Nils). The tomte turns the naughty boy Nils into a tomte at the beginning of the book, and Nils then travels across Sweden on the back of a goose.

A tomte stars in one of author Jan Brett's children's stories, Hedgie's Surprise. When adapting the mainly English-language concept of tomten having helpers (sometimes in a workshop), tomtenisse can also correspond to the Christmas elf, either replacing it completely, or simply lending its name to the elf-like depictions in the case of translations.

Nisser/tomte often appear in Christmas calendar TV series and other modern fiction. In some versions the tomte are portrayed as very small; in others they are human-sized. The nisse usually exist hidden from humans and are often able to use magic.

The 2018 animated series Hilda, as well as the graphic novel series it is based on, features nisse as a species. One nisse named Tontu is a recurring character, portrayed as a small, hairy humanoid who lives unseen in the main character's home.

The LIGO detectors suffer from regular glitches in their data which, when studied with certain time-frequency transformations, resemble tomte hats. Glitches with this particular morphology are classified as tomtes by scientists working to improve detector data quality.

== Garden gnome ==
The appearance traditionally ascribed to a nisse or tomte resembles that of the garden gnome figurine for outdoors, which are in turn, also called trädgårdstomte in Swedish, havenisse in Danish, hagenisse in Norwegian and puutarhatonttu in Finnish.

== See also ==
- Brownie (Scotland and England)
- Domovoi (Slavic)
- Duende (Spain, Hispanic America)
- Dwarf
- Elf
- Christmas elf
- Gnome
- Heinzelmännchen (Germany)
- Kabouter (The Netherlands)
- Hob (Northern England)
- Household deity
  - Lares (Roman)
  - List of Lithuanian household gods
- Kobold (Germany)
- Legendary creature
- Leprechaun (Ireland)
- Nis Puk (in Schleswig/Southern Jutland, now divided between Denmark (Northern Schleswig) and Germany (Southern Schleswig)
- Santa Claus
- Sprite
- Spiriduș (Romania)
- Tonttu or Haltija (Finland)
- Tudigong
- Vættir
- Yule Lads (Iceland)
