= Cecilia Bååth-Holmberg =

Swedish writer, translator, educator, and activist

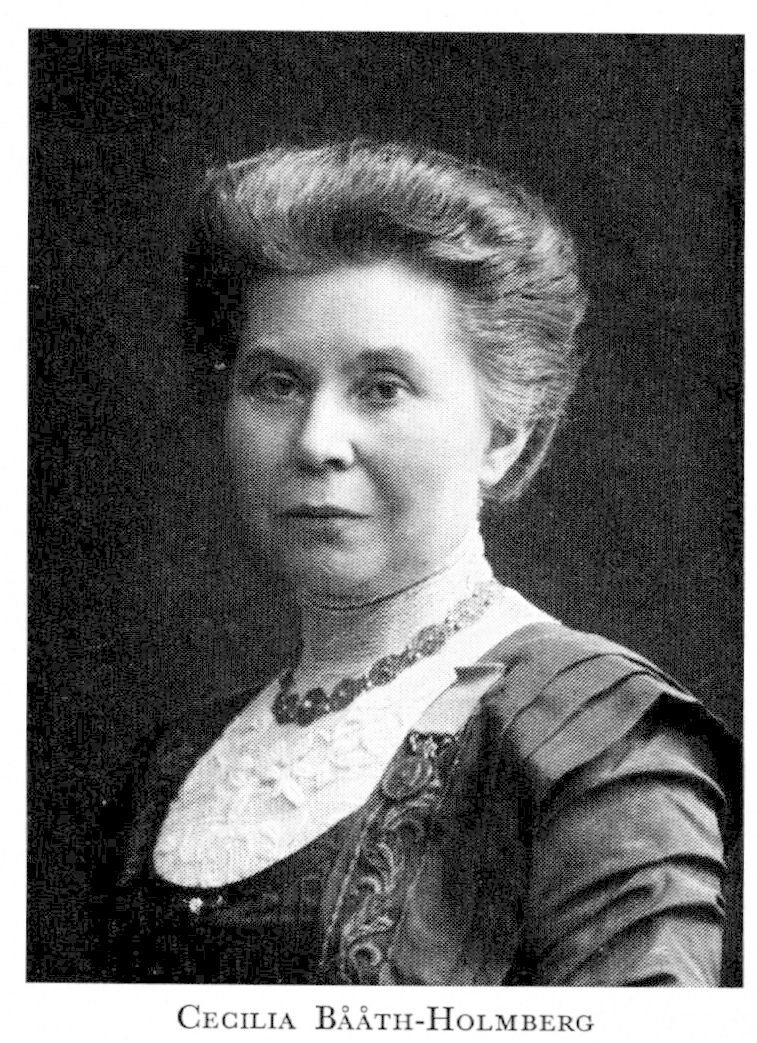
- Cecilia Bååth-Holmberg around 1910
- Born: Cecilia Ulrika Laura Lovisa Bååth-Holmberg; 1 March 1857; Malmö, Sweden
- Died: 30 July 1920 (aged 63); Stockholm, Sweden
- Occupations: Writer; translator; educator; activist
- Spouse: Teodor Holmberg
- Parents: Laurentius Andreas Bååth; Alfhilda Bååth

Cecilia Ulrika Laura Lovisa Bååth-Holmberg (1 March 1857 – 30 July 1920) was a Swedish writer, translator, educator, and activist. Best known for her Swedish translation of the hymn "Härlig är jorden", she was awarded the Swedish royal medal Litteris et Artibus for her significant contributions. As an active proponent of public morality, Bååth-Holmberg established the Swedish National Association for Moral Culture in 1909. At her suggestion, Mother's Day was celebrated for the first time in Sweden in 1919.

== Life ==
Cecilia Bååth-Holmberg was born on 1 March 1857 in Malmö, Sweden. Her father Laurentius Andreas Bååth was a vicar, and her mother Alfhilda Bååth came from a German family. Bååth-Holmberg's father died when she was very young. She grew up in a religious family, which helped develop in her a strong social conscience and firmly held conservative ideas.

In 1877, Bååth-Holmberg married Teodor Holmberg. They moved to Västmanland where her husband became the first principal of the newly formed Tärna Folk High School. Bååth-Holmberg was responsible for supervising the school's domestic science education, and she started teaching courses that were intended for female students. As lecturers and debaters, the couple became prominent figures in the field of popular education, and were actively engaged in discussions on educational, social and cultural issues. They ran the school for 36 years.

Bååth-Holmberg had a productive writing career. She authored several works of fiction including, the anthology of short stories entitled Pepita och andra berättelser (1899), and I häfdernas hall: Verklighetssagor för de unga (1900). Her works of nonfiction included travel books on Nordic places, and historical biographies of eminent figures such as those of Giuseppe Garibaldi and Charles XV. Commentators have described her writings to be reproduced by Bååth-Holmberg's stereotyping of national romanticism.

Bååth-Holmberg was widely recognised as a translator and she translated a large number of works from Norwegian, Danish, and German to Swedish. She is arguably best known for her Swedish translation of the hymn "Härlig är jorden".

Bååth-Holmberg actively championed against the negative impact of literature and press on public morality, publishing an article in Stockholms Dagblad in 1908. The following year, she co-founded the Swedish National Association for Moral Culture with her husband. Since its inception, the association was influential in the social scene, releasing publications, lectures, and a programme called Förädlande folknöjen. Bååth-Holmberg became an imperative figure of the organisation, serving as its chairperson, and later its secretary. During this time, she also wrote for its magazine På Vakt, contributing reviews that criticised the modernity of literature. At her suggestion, Mother's Day was celebrated for the first time in Sweden in 1919.
