= Söderslätt =

Coordinates: 55.4158°N 13.0367°E

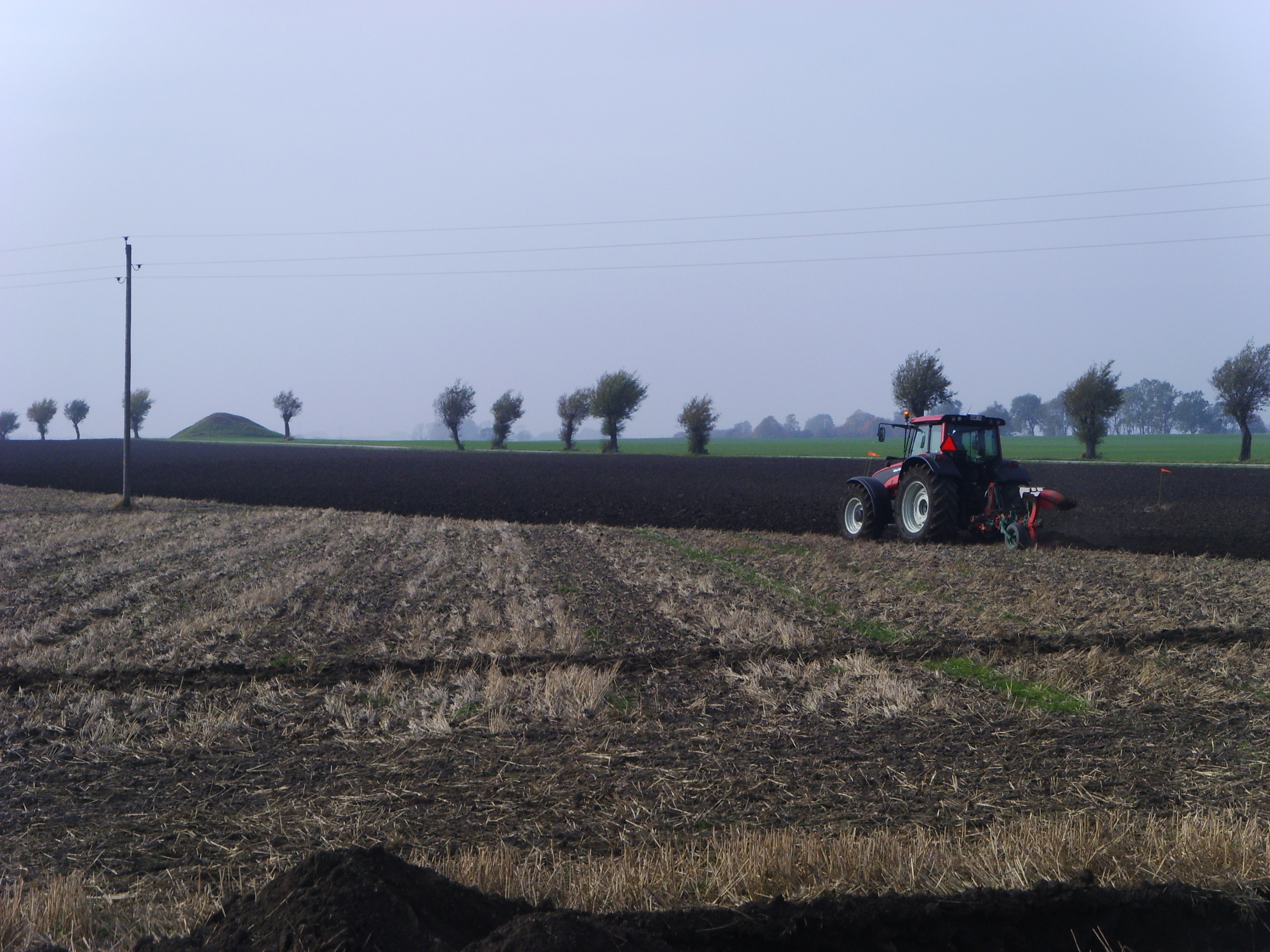
Typical view from the rich fields of Söderslätt

Söderslätt ("South Plain") is a Swedish agricultural district, known for its very high quality soil. It is located in the south-west of Scania, at the southernmost peak of the Scandinavian Peninsula. It isn't an administrative area but is usually considered to comprise four municipalities: Skurup, Svedala, Trelleborg and Vellinge (of which the latter includes the Falsterbo Peninsula). Malmö, Scania's largest city, is not really associated with this agricultural area. But that city's eastern end equals Söderslätt's western boundary. Whilst the smaller town Trelleborg sooner is a part of the area. It's the southernmost town at the entire Scandinavian Peninsula and has extensive car ferry traffic with the European continent.

== Climate and nature ==
A fairly mild winter climate in combination with stone-free boulder clay gives the area very good yield It is located east of Malmö, south-east of Lund and down to the southernmost peak of Sweden Smygehuk (latitude N 55°20′).

Söderslätt has only a few tiny beech forests, and on sandy soil the typical combination of pine and birch instead. The landscape almost lacks lakes and rivers. A few ponds and minor streams. The Falsterbo Peninsula is connected to Söderslätt, though physically separated by the canal known as Falsterbokanalen. Falsterbo Horse Show is organized annually in Falsterbo, where also several links golf courses are located. They are typically opened all year, but may close (or use special "winter greens") in case of snow. Falsterbo is most well known as an important ornithological station.

Migratory birds are flying toward the south-west during the autumn, many of them attempt to follow land as long as they can (especially such birds that cannot land on water), and as Falsterbo is located as south-west as possible at the Scandinavian Peninsula. The migratory birds tend to gather around Falsterbo for a rest or until the weather conditions are good in order to fly across the Baltic Sea to the European continent. The high number of migratory birds during September, October and November also attract birds of prey to the area.

== Malmö-Sturup Airport ==
Malmö airport Sturup (ICAO: ESMS, IATA: MMX) is located at Söderslätt, some 35 km east of its city. It's an airport of rather low importance. Domestic flights to Stockholm departure around every hour. To this only a few daily international departures can be added. The main reason for Sweden's third-largest city to have such a small airport is that Kastrup Airport (ICAO:EKCH, IATA: CPH) in Copenhagen, Denmark is located closer (to Malmö), have train connections and Kastrup has worldwide connections, it is the largest airport in Scandinavia.
