= Listed buildings in East Sussex =

There are around 6,400 Listed buildings in East Sussex, which are buildings of architectural or historic interest.

- Grade I buildings are of exceptional interest.
- Grade II* buildings are particularly important buildings of more than special interest.
- Grade II buildings are of special interest.

The lists follow Historic England’s geographical organisation, with entries grouped by ceremonial county, local authority, and parish (civil and non-civil). Listed buildings in the city of Brighton are predominantly recorded under the ceremonial county of West Sussex, with a smaller number recorded under the ceremonial county of East Sussex.

Local authority	Listed buildings list	Grade I	Grade II*	Grade II	Total	Map
The City of Brighton and Hove	Grade I listed buildings in Brighton and Hove; Grade II* listed buildings in Brighton and Hove; Grade II listed buildings in Brighton and Hove: A–B; Grade II listed buildings in Brighton and Hove: C–D; Grade II listed buildings in Brighton and Hove: E–H; Grade II listed buildings in Brighton and Hove: I–L; Grade II listed buildings in Brighton and Hove: M Grade II listed buildings in Brighton and Hove: N–O; Grade II listed buildings in Brighton and Hove: P–R; Grade II listed buildings in Brighton and Hove: S Grade II listed buildings in Brighton and Hove: T–V; Grade II listed buildings in Brighton and Hove: W–Z	1	3	23	27	
Eastbourne (non-civil parish)	Listed buildings in Eastbourne	3	12	119	173	
Hastings (non-civil parish)	Listed buildings in Hastings (Old Town); Listed buildings in Hastings (outside Old Town)	1	24	547	579	
Lewes District	Listed buildings in Lewes district, East Sussex	29	63	1,183	1,396	
Rother District	Listed buildings in Rother district, East Sussex	42	81	2,026	2,197	
Wealden District	Listed buildings in Wealden district, East Sussex	53	120	2,104	2,383	
Total (East Sussex)	—	129	303	6,002	6,434	—

== See also ==
- Grade I listed buildings in East Sussex
- Grade II* listed buildings in East Sussex
