= Listed buildings in Wealden district, East Sussex =

== Wealden District ==
There are around 2,250 Listed buildings in Wealden District, East Sussex, which are buildings of architectural or historic interest.

- Grade I buildings are of exceptional interest.
- Grade II* buildings are particularly important buildings of more than special interest.
- Grade II buildings are of special interest.

The lists follow Historic England's geographical organisation, with entries grouped by county, local authority, and parish (civil and non-civil). The following lists are arranged by parish.

Parish	Listed buildings list	Grade I	Grade II*	Grade II	Total
Alciston	Listed buildings in Alciston				
Alfriston	Listed buildings in Alfriston				
Arlington	Listed buildings in Arlington, East Sussex				
Berwick	Listed buildings in Berwick, East Sussex				
Buxted	Listed buildings in Buxted				
Chalvington with Ripe	Listed buildings in Chalvington with Ripe				
Chiddingly	Listed buildings in Chiddingly				
Crowborough	Listed buildings in Crowborough				
Cuckmere Valley	Listed buildings in Cuckmere Valley				
Danehill	Listed buildings in Danehill				
East Dean and Friston	Listed buildings in East Dean and Friston				
East Hoathly with Halland	Listed buildings in East Hoathly with Halland				
Fletching	Listed buildings in Fletching				
Forest Row	Listed buildings in Forest Row				
Framfield	Listed buildings in Framfield				
Frant	Listed buildings in Frant	1	2	80	83
Hadlow Down	Listed buildings in Hadlow Down				
Hailsham	Listed buildings in Hailsham				
Hartfield	Listed buildings in Hartfield				
Heathfield and Waldron	Listed buildings in Heathfield and Waldron				
Hellingly	Listed buildings in Hellingly				
Herstmonceux	Listed buildings in Herstmonceux				
Hooe	Listed buildings in Hooe, East Sussex				
Horam	Listed buildings in Horam				
Isfield	Listed buildings in Isfield				
Laughton	Listed buildings in Laughton, East Sussex				
Little Horsted	Listed buildings in Little Horsted				
Long Man	Listed buildings in Long Man				
Maresfield	Listed buildings in Maresfield				
Mayfield and Five Ashes	Listed buildings in Mayfield and Five Ashes				
Ninfield	Listed buildings in Ninfield				
Pevensey	Listed buildings in Pevensey				
Polegate	Listed buildings in Polegate				
Rotherfield	Listed buildings in Rotherfield				
Selmeston	Listed buildings in Selmeston				
Uckfield	Listed buildings in Uckfield				
Wadhurst	Listed buildings in Wadhurst				
Warbleton	Listed buildings in Warbleton				
Wartling	Listed buildings in Wartling				
Westham	Listed buildings in Westham, East Sussex				
Willingdon and Jevington	Listed buildings in Willingdon and Jevington				
Withyham	Listed buildings in Withyham				
Total (Wealden district)	—	52	110	2,097	2,259
