= Black Annis =

English folklore bogeyman

Black Annis (also known as Black Agnes or Black Anna) is a bogeywoman figure in English folklore. She is imagined as a blue-faced hag or witch with iron claws and a taste for human flesh (especially children). She is said to haunt the countryside of Leicestershire, living in a cave in the Dane Hills with a great oak tree at the entrance.

She is said to venture out at night looking for unsuspecting children and lambs to eat, then tanning their skins by hanging them on a tree before wearing them around her waist. She would reach inside houses to snatch people. Legend has it that she used her iron claws to dig her cave out of the side of a sandstone cliff, making herself a home there which is known as Black Annis' Bower Close. The legend led to parents warning their children that Black Annis would get them if they did not behave. She was also known to hide in the branches of her oak tree waiting to leap upon unsuspecting prey.

Other traditions stated that when she ground her teeth people could hear her, giving them time to bolt their doors and to keep away from the window. It is said that cottages in Leicestershire were purposely built with small windows so that Black Annis could only get a single arm inside. When she howled, she could be heard 5 mi (8.0 km) away, then the cottagers would fasten skins across the window and place protective herbs above it to keep themselves safe. (Note: Briggs here quotes Ruth Tongue who records these traditions in Forgotten Folk-Tales of the English Counties (1970).)

== Origins ==
The earliest known written reference to Black Annis was from an eighteenth century title deed that referred to a parcel of land (or "close") as "Black Anny's Bower Close". The first volume of County Folklore (1895), published by The Folklore Society, mentions two such title deeds dated May 13th and 14th, 1764.

The Black Annis figure has several possible origins. Some have claimed, as T. C. Lethbridge did, that the origin can be found in Celtic mythology based on Danu (or Anu) or it may derive from Germanic mythology (see Hel). Donald Alexander Mackenzie in his 1917 book Myths of Crete and Pre-Hellenic Europe suggested the origin of the legend may go back to the mother goddess of ancient Europe which he contends was thought of as a devourer of children. He identified Black Annis as being similar to the Indic Kali, Gaelic Muilearteach and Cailleach Bheare, the Greek Demeter, the Mesopotamian Labartu and the Egyptian Isis-Hathor and Neith. It has been suggested that the legend may derive from a popular memory of sacrifice to an ancient goddess. It is thought that offerings of children may have been made to the goddess that inspired the legend in the archaeological Hunting Period, the oak tree at the cave's entrance also a common site of local meetings.

Ronald Hutton however disagrees with such theories in his book The Triumph of the Moon: A History of Modern Pagan Witchcraft. He suggests that the Black Annis of Leicestershire legend was based on a real person named Agnes Scott, a late medieval anchoress (or by some accounts a Dominican nun who cared for a local leper colony), born in Little Antrum, who lived a life of prayer in a cave in the Dane Hills and was buried in the churchyard in Swithland. Hutton suggests that the memory of Scott was distorted into the image of Black Annis either to frighten local children or due to the anti-anchorite sentiment that arose from the Protestant Reformation. In the Victorian era the story of Agnes Scott, or Annis, became confused with the similarly named goddess Anu. Lethbridge made this connection and went on to claim that Annis was the personification of the Great Goddess in crone form, leading to interest from Wiccan groups.

The connection between Black Annis and Agnes Scott was made previous to Hutton, including the gravesite and cave, in an issue of the Leicester Chronicle dated Feb. 26th, 1842 and reprinted in the first volume of County Folklore (1895).

Many of the modern conceptions of Black Annis were popularised in a poem by John Heyrick, given in full in County Folklore but excerpted here:

'Tis said the soul of mortal man recoiled
To view Black Annis' eye, so fierce and wild
Vast talons, foul with human flesh, there grew
In place of hands, and features livid blue
Glared in her visage, whilst her obscene waist
Warm skins of human victims close embraced

Not without terror they the cave survey
Where hung the monstrous trophies of her sway
'Tis said that in the rock large rooms were found
Scooped with her claws beneath the flinty ground

== Customs and traces ==
Black Annis was also represented in monstrous cat form, and the legend led to a local ritual in early spring when a dead cat would be dragged before a pack of hounds in front of her bower to celebrate the end of winter. According to Katharine Briggs, this drag hunt was held on Easter Monday (also known as Black Monday) and led from Annis' Bower to the mayor of Leicester's house. The bait dragged was a dead cat drenched in aniseed. This custom died out at the end of the 18th century.

Another tradition stated that Black Annis (in the form of Cat Anna) lived in the cellars beneath Leicester Castle and that there was an underground passage extending from the cellars to the Dane Hills along which she ran.

In 1837, a play called Black Anna's Bower, or the Maniac of the Dane Hills was performed at the Leicester Theatre. The plot involved the murder of a landlady of the Blue Boar Inn, in which Black Anna played a part similar to that of the witches in Macbeth.

== See also ==
- Allison Gross
- Baba Yaga
- Black Lady of Bradley Woods
- Grindylow
- Jenny Greenteeth
- Nelly Longarms
- Peg Powler
