= Danehill =

Danehill may refer to:

- Danehill (horse)
- Danehill, East Sussex

== See also ==
- Dane Hills, Leicester, England
