= Listed buildings in Hastings (Old Town) =

Historic structures in East Sussex, England

Hastings is a town and borough in East Sussex, England. It contains one grade I, 23 grade II* and 546 grade II listed buildings that are recorded in the National Heritage List for England.

This list is based on the information retrieved online from Historic England.

The number of listed buildings in Hastings requires subdivision into geographically defined lists. This list comprises all listed buildings in the Old Town located within the line of the historic town walls. This area is designated as the Old Town Conservation Area.

== Key ==
Grade	Criteria
I	Buildings that are of exceptional interest
II*	Particularly important buildings of more than special interest
II	Buildings that are of special interest

== Listing ==
Name	Grade	Location	Type	Completed (Note: The date given is the date used by Historic England as significant for the initial building or that of an important part in the structure's description.)	Date designated	Grid ref. (Note: The grid reference is based on the British national grid reference system, sometimes known as OSGB36, used by the Ordnance Survey.) Geo-coordinates	Notes	Entry number (Note: The "List Entry Number" is a unique number assigned to each listed building and scheduled monument by Historic England.)	Image	Wikidata
Raised Pavement Retaining Walls on East Side of All Saints' Street	II	All Saints Street			14 September 1976	TQ8270109736; 50°51′30″N 0°35′40″E		1043593	Upload Photo	Q26295582
Churchyard Wall to West of All Saints Church	II	All Saints Street			14 September 1976	TQ8278909880; 50°51′34″N 0°35′45″E		1043625	Upload Photo	Q26295616
Church of All Saints	II*	All Saints Street			19 January 1951	TQ8282609860; 50°51′34″N 0°35′47″E		1353127	Church of All Saints More images	Q17555554
9-11, All Saints Street	II	9-11, All Saints Street			14 September 1976	TQ8276609822; 50°51′32″N 0°35′44″E		1353128	Upload Photo	Q26636077
The Stag Inn	II	14, All Saints Street			19 January 1951	TQ8274909794; 50°51′32″N 0°35′43″E		1043626	Upload Photo	Q7596744
Conster Manse	II	27, All Saints Street			14 September 1976	TQ8272009749; 50°51′30″N 0°35′41″E		1043627	Upload Photo	Q26295619
28, All Saints Street	II	28, All Saints Street			14 September 1976	TQ8271709746; 50°51′30″N 0°35′41″E		1353129	Upload Photo	Q26636078
29 and 30, All Saints Street	II	29 and 30, All Saints Street			19 January 1951	TQ8271109742; 50°51′30″N 0°35′41″E		1043628	Upload Photo	Q26295620
30a and 31, All Saints Street	II	30a and 31, All Saints Street			14 September 1976	TQ8270809734; 50°51′30″N 0°35′41″E		1353130	Upload Photo	Q26636079
32-34, All Saints Street	II	32-34, All Saints Street			14 September 1976	TQ8270609729; 50°51′30″N 0°35′41″E		1043629	Upload Photo	Q26295621
35, All Saints Street	II	35, All Saints Street			14 September 1976	TQ8270109718; 50°51′29″N 0°35′40″E		1043630	Upload Photo	Q26295622
36 and 38, All Saints Street	II	36 and 38, All Saints Street			14 September 1976	TQ8270009712; 50°51′29″N 0°35′40″E		1353131	Upload Photo	Q26636080
Hawarden House	II	42a, All Saints Street			14 September 1976	TQ8268309690; 50°51′28″N 0°35′39″E		1293855	Upload Photo	Q26581755
49, All Saints Street	II	49, All Saints Street			14 September 1976	TQ8267009658; 50°51′27″N 0°35′39″E		1043631	Upload Photo	Q26295623
50, All Saints Street	II	50, All Saints Street			14 September 1976	TQ8266909655; 50°51′27″N 0°35′39″E		1190393	Upload Photo	Q26493996
Greensleeves	II	51, All Saints Street			14 September 1976	TQ8266509648; 50°51′27″N 0°35′38″E		1353132	Upload Photo	Q26636081
52, All Saints Street	II	52, All Saints Street			14 September 1976	TQ8266409644; 50°51′27″N 0°35′38″E		1043632	Upload Photo	Q26295624
53 and 53 1/2, All Saints Street	II	53 and 53 1/2, All Saints Street			14 September 1976	TQ8265609641; 50°51′27″N 0°35′38″E		1190394	Upload Photo	Q26493997
Victoria Cottage	II	53b, All Saints Street			14 September 1976	TQ8268609625; 50°51′26″N 0°35′39″E		1353133	Upload Photo	Q26636082
54, All Saints Street	II	54, All Saints Street			14 September 1976	TQ8265709634; 50°51′27″N 0°35′38″E		1293832	Upload Photo	Q26581734
57, All Saints Street	II	57, All Saints Street			14 September 1976	TQ8264909620; 50°51′26″N 0°35′37″E		1043633	Upload Photo	Q26295625
Tudor Cottage	II	58, All Saints Street			19 January 1951	TQ8264509614; 50°51′26″N 0°35′37″E		1043634	Upload Photo	Q26295626
59, All Saints Street	II	59, All Saints Street			19 January 1951	TQ8264309610; 50°51′26″N 0°35′37″E		1293833	Upload Photo	Q26581735
60, All Saints Street	II	60, All Saints Street			19 January 1951	TQ8263709607; 50°51′26″N 0°35′37″E		1353134	Upload Photo	Q26636083
61, All Saints Street	II	61, All Saints Street			14 September 1976	TQ8262909594; 50°51′25″N 0°35′36″E		1043635	Upload Photo	Q26295627
62, All Saints Street	II	62, All Saints Street			14 September 1976	TQ8262609588; 50°51′25″N 0°35′36″E		1190404	Upload Photo	Q26494007
63, All Saints Street	II	63, All Saints Street			14 September 1976	TQ8262509584; 50°51′25″N 0°35′36″E		1353135	Upload Photo	Q26636084
70-72, All Saints Street	II	70-72, All Saints Street			14 September 1976	TQ8260409545; 50°51′24″N 0°35′35″E		1190409	Upload Photo	Q26494011
73, All Saints Street	II	73, All Saints Street			14 September 1976	TQ8260009534; 50°51′23″N 0°35′35″E		1043636	Upload Photo	Q26295629
74a, All Saints Street	II	74a, All Saints Street			14 September 1976	TQ8259309532; 50°51′23″N 0°35′34″E		1043592	Upload Photo	Q26295580
East Cliff House	II	74, All Saints Street			14 September 1976	TQ8259309518; 50°51′23″N 0°35′34″E		1353154	Upload Photo	Q26636102
80, 81 and 81a, All Saints Street	II	80, 81 and 81a, All Saints Street			14 September 1976	TQ8258809556; 50°51′24″N 0°35′34″E		1043594	Upload Photo	Q26295583
83, All Saints Street	II	83, All Saints Street			14 September 1976	TQ8259009565; 50°51′24″N 0°35′34″E		1043595	Upload Photo	Q26295584
84 and 85, All Saints Street	II	84 and 85, All Saints Street			14 September 1976	TQ8259609574; 50°51′25″N 0°35′35″E		1043596	Upload Photo	Q26295585
87, All Saints Street	II	87, All Saints Street			14 September 1976	TQ8260109588; 50°51′25″N 0°35′35″E		1043597	Upload Photo	Q26295586
88, All Saints Street	II	88, All Saints Street			14 September 1976	TQ8260409591; 50°51′25″N 0°35′35″E		1043598	Upload Photo	Q26295587
89 and 89a, All Saints Street	II	89 and 89a, All Saints Street			14 September 1976	TQ8260909594; 50°51′25″N 0°35′35″E		1043599	Upload Photo	Q26295588
90, All Saints Street	II	90, All Saints Street			14 September 1976	TQ8261209600; 50°51′25″N 0°35′36″E		1043600	Upload Photo	Q26295589
91 and 92, All Saints Street	II	91 and 92, All Saints Street			14 September 1976	TQ8261609604; 50°51′26″N 0°35′36″E		1043601	Upload Photo	Q26295590
The Fishermen's Institute and Society	II	97 and 97a, All Saints Street			14 September 1976	TQ8262909641; 50°51′27″N 0°35′36″E		1353155	Upload Photo	Q26636103
101, All Saints Street	II	101, All Saints Street			14 September 1976	TQ8264509656; 50°51′27″N 0°35′37″E		1043602	Upload Photo	Q26295592
102 and 103, All Saints Street	II	102 and 103, All Saints Street			14 September 1976	TQ8264709664; 50°51′28″N 0°35′37″E		1353156	Upload Photo	Q26636104
104, All Saints Street	II	104, All Saints Street			14 September 1976	TQ8265009666; 50°51′28″N 0°35′38″E		1190441	Upload Photo	Q26494039
106, All Saints Street	II	106, All Saints Street			14 September 1976	TQ8265609676; 50°51′28″N 0°35′38″E		1043603	Upload Photo	Q26295593
107, All Saints Street	II	107, All Saints Street			14 September 1976	TQ8265509683; 50°51′28″N 0°35′38″E		1190451	Upload Photo	Q26494049
108, All Saints Street	II	108, All Saints Street			14 September 1976	TQ8265709689; 50°51′28″N 0°35′38″E		1353157	Upload Photo	Q26636105
113, All Saints Street	II	113, All Saints Street			14 September 1976	TQ8267109708; 50°51′29″N 0°35′39″E		1043604	Upload Photo	Q26295594
116 and 117, All Saints Street	II	116 and 117, All Saints Street			14 September 1976	TQ8267109719; 50°51′29″N 0°35′39″E		1190470	Upload Photo	Q26494066
118, All Saints Street	II	118, All Saints Street			14 September 1976	TQ8267709722; 50°51′29″N 0°35′39″E		1043605	Upload Photo	Q26295595
Captain's Cabin	II	120, All Saints Street			14 September 1976	TQ8268209732; 50°51′30″N 0°35′39″E		1353158	Upload Photo	Q26636106
121, All Saints Street	II	121, All Saints Street			19 January 1951	TQ8268809737; 50°51′30″N 0°35′40″E		1190494	Upload Photo	Q26494088
122 and 122a, All Saints Street	II	122 and 122a, All Saints Street			14 September 1976	TQ8268909744; 50°51′30″N 0°35′40″E		1190495	Upload Photo	Q26494090
123, All Saints Street	II	123, All Saints Street			14 September 1976	TQ8269309750; 50°51′30″N 0°35′40″E		1353159	Upload Photo	Q26636107
125, All Saints Street	II	125, All Saints Street			19 January 1951	TQ8269609760; 50°51′31″N 0°35′40″E		1043607	Upload Photo	Q26295597
126 and 127, All Saints Street	II	126 and 127, All Saints Street			14 September 1976	TQ8270409769; 50°51′31″N 0°35′41″E		1190585	Upload Photo	Q26485337
128, All Saints Street	II	128, All Saints Street			14 September 1976	TQ8270709773; 50°51′31″N 0°35′41″E		1043608	Upload Photo	Q26295598
129 and 130, All Saints Street	II	129 and 130, All Saints Street			14 September 1976	TQ8271209779; 50°51′31″N 0°35′41″E		1190630	Upload Photo	Q26485379
131, All Saints Street	II	131, All Saints Street			14 September 1976	TQ8271809791; 50°51′32″N 0°35′41″E		1353160	Upload Photo	Q26636108
132, All Saints Street	II	132, All Saints Street			14 September 1976	TQ8271909798; 50°51′32″N 0°35′41″E		1043609	Upload Photo	Q26295599
133, All Saints Street	II	133, All Saints Street			14 September 1976	TQ8272409804; 50°51′32″N 0°35′42″E		1190638	Upload Photo	Q26485387
Elm House	II	134, All Saints Street			14 September 1976	TQ8272709807; 50°51′32″N 0°35′42″E		1353161	Upload Photo	Q26636109
135, 135a, 136 and 137, All Saints Street	II	135, 135a, 136 and 137, All Saints Street			19 January 1951	TQ8273109813; 50°51′32″N 0°35′42″E		1043610	Upload Photo	Q26295601
Vine Cottage	II	135b, All Saints Street			14 September 1976	TQ8271909822; 50°51′33″N 0°35′41″E		1190650	Upload Photo	Q26485399
138, All Saints Street	II	138, All Saints Street			14 September 1976	TQ8273809823; 50°51′33″N 0°35′42″E		1353122	Upload Photo	Q26636073
139-141, All Saints Street	II	139-141, All Saints Street			14 September 1976	TQ8274809835; 50°51′33″N 0°35′43″E		1293717	Upload Photo	Q26581628
Hastings Castle	I	Castle Hill			19 January 1951	TQ8202709482; 50°51′22″N 0°35′05″E		1043579	Hastings Castle More images	Q5680295
4 and 6, Courthouse Street	II	4 and 6, Courthouse Street			14 September 1976	TQ8251009621; 50°51′26″N 0°35′30″E		1190827	Upload Photo	Q26485577
1, Church Passage	II	1, Church Passage			14 September 1976	TQ8246809639; 50°51′27″N 0°35′28″E		1043583	Upload Photo	Q26295570
2 and 3, Church Passage	II	2 and 3, Church Passage			14 September 1976	TQ8246209640; 50°51′27″N 0°35′28″E		1043584	Upload Photo	Q26295571
7, Church Passage	II	7, Church Passage			14 September 1976	TQ8237909688; 50°51′29″N 0°35′24″E		1190778	Upload Photo	Q26485529
West Hill Villa	II	Cobourg Place			14 September 1976	TQ8233909634; 50°51′27″N 0°35′22″E		1190791	Upload Photo	Q26485541
Harpsichord House	II	Cobourg Place			14 September 1976	TQ8234609652; 50°51′27″N 0°35′22″E		1353149	Upload Photo	Q26636097
8, Cobourg Place	II	8, Cobourg Place			14 September 1976	TQ8236709674; 50°51′28″N 0°35′23″E		1190783	Upload Photo	Q26485534
Albion House	II	11, Cobourg Place			19 January 1951	TQ8235109661; 50°51′28″N 0°35′22″E		1043585	Upload Photo	Q26295573
8, 8a and 8b, Courthouse Street	II	8, 8a and 8b, Courthouse Street			14 September 1976	TQ8252509611; 50°51′26″N 0°35′31″E		1043588	Upload Photo	Q26295576
9, Courthouse Street	II	9, Courthouse Street			14 September 1976	TQ8254009637; 50°51′27″N 0°35′32″E		1043586	Upload Photo	Q26295574
11 and 13, Courthouse Street	II	11 and 13, Courthouse Street			14 September 1976	TQ8253509627; 50°51′26″N 0°35′32″E		1043587	Upload Photo	Q26295575
17, Courthouse Street	II	17, Courthouse Street			14 September 1976	TQ8254509624; 50°51′26″N 0°35′32″E		1190822	Upload Photo	Q26485572
18, Courthouse Street	II	18, Courthouse Street			14 September 1976	TQ8258909575; 50°51′25″N 0°35′34″E		1353151	Upload Photo	Q26636099
The King's Head Public House	II	25, Courthouse Street			14 September 1976	TQ8256609615; 50°51′26″N 0°35′33″E		1353150	Upload Photo	Q26636098
Garden Cottage	II	Croft Road			14 September 1976	TQ8247009718; 50°51′29″N 0°35′29″E		1293594	Upload Photo	Q26683889
4, 4 and a Half and 6, Croft Road	II	4, 4 And A Half And 6, Croft Road			14 September 1976	TQ8245309668; 50°51′28″N 0°35′28″E		1043559	Upload Photo	Q26295539
5 and 7, Croft Road	II	5 and 7, Croft Road			14 September 1976	TQ8241009629; 50°51′27″N 0°35′25″E		1353173	Upload Photo	Q26636121
9-13, Croft Road	II	9-13, Croft Road			19 January 1951	TQ8241409634; 50°51′27″N 0°35′25″E		1043549	Upload Photo	Q26295528
Sinnock House	II	14a, Croft Road			14 September 1976	TQ8246909699; 50°51′29″N 0°35′28″E		1353175	Upload Photo	Q26636123
15, Croft Road	II	15, Croft Road			19 January 1951	TQ8242409642; 50°51′27″N 0°35′26″E		1043550	Upload Photo	Q26295529
17, Croft Road	II	17, Croft Road			14 September 1976	TQ8242809649; 50°51′27″N 0°35′26″E		1043551	Upload Photo	Q26295530
19, Croft Road	II	19, Croft Road			14 September 1976	TQ8243009653; 50°51′27″N 0°35′26″E		1043552	Upload Photo	Q26295531
Stanhope House	II	21, Croft Road			14 September 1976	TQ8243309657; 50°51′28″N 0°35′27″E		1043553	Upload Photo	Q26295532
23, Croft Road	II	23, Croft Road			14 September 1976	TQ8243709662; 50°51′28″N 0°35′27″E		1043554	Upload Photo	Q26295534
25, Croft Road	II	25, Croft Road			14 September 1976	TQ8243909666; 50°51′28″N 0°35′27″E		1043555	Upload Photo	Q26295535
27, Croft Road	II	27, Croft Road			14 September 1976	TQ8243909672; 50°51′28″N 0°35′27″E		1043556	Upload Photo	Q26295536
St Clement's House	II	29, Croft Road			19 January 1951	TQ8244209680; 50°51′28″N 0°35′27″E		1043557	Upload Photo	Q26295537
Dunroamin	II	33, Croft Road			19 January 1951	TQ8244609690; 50°51′29″N 0°35′27″E		1190893	Upload Photo	Q26485641
35, Croft Road	II	35, Croft Road			14 September 1976	TQ8244209693; 50°51′29″N 0°35′27″E		1043558	Upload Photo	Q26295538
Isabella Cottages	II	39 and 41, Croft Road			14 September 1976	TQ8243509701; 50°51′29″N 0°35′27″E		1353174	Upload Photo	Q26636122
42, Croft Road	II	42, Croft Road			14 September 1976	TQ8243409775; 50°51′31″N 0°35′27″E		1043560	Upload Photo	Q26295542
44, Croft Road	II	44, Croft Road			14 September 1976	TQ8243509782; 50°51′32″N 0°35′27″E		1293596	Upload Photo	Q26581519
57 and 59, Croft Road	II	57 and 59, Croft Road			19 January 1951	TQ8240409739; 50°51′30″N 0°35′25″E		1293591	Upload Photo	Q26581514
The Royal Standard Public House	II	19, East Street			14 September 1976	TQ8251909515; 50°51′23″N 0°35′31″E		1043525	Upload Photo	Q26295501
Ebenezer Particular Baptist Chapel	II	Ebenezer Road			19 January 1951	TQ8281309765; 50°51′31″N 0°35′46″E		1043527	Upload Photo	Q2658039
1 and 3, Ebenezer Road	II	1 and 3, Ebenezer Road			14 September 1976	TQ8276809811; 50°51′32″N 0°35′44″E		1353162	Upload Photo	Q26636110
9-13, Ebenezer Road	II	9-13, Ebenezer Road			14 September 1976	TQ8279109794; 50°51′32″N 0°35′45″E		1043526	Upload Photo	Q26295503
Royal Hill House	II	15, Ebenezer Road			14 September 1976	TQ8279709789; 50°51′31″N 0°35′45″E		1353163	Upload Photo	Q26636111
Rock House	II	Exmouth Place			14 September 1976	TQ8233809546; 50°51′24″N 0°35′21″E		1293537	Upload Photo	Q26581467
West Hill Cottage	II	Exmouth Place			14 September 1976	TQ8238509574; 50°51′25″N 0°35′24″E		1043534	Upload Photo	Q26295510
West Hill House	II	Exmouth Place			14 September 1976	TQ8235809594; 50°51′26″N 0°35′23″E		1043533	Upload Photo	Q26295509
Gas Lighting Column at the Top of Steps to the Nw of No. 6 Exmouth Place	II	Exmouth Place			11 November 2002	TQ8232809601; 50°51′26″N 0°35′21″E		1096114	Upload Photo	Q26388408
1 and 1a, Exmouth Place	II	1 and 1a, Exmouth Place			14 September 1976	TQ8231709556; 50°51′24″N 0°35′20″E		1043530	Upload Photo	Q26295506
Exmouth Cottage	II	5, Exmouth Place			14 September 1976	TQ8233109578; 50°51′25″N 0°35′21″E		1043531	Upload Photo	Q26295507
Exmouth House	II	6, Exmouth Place			19 January 1951	TQ8233509585; 50°51′25″N 0°35′21″E		1043532	Upload Photo	Q26295508
Hill Cottage	II	9, Exmouth Place			14 September 1976	TQ8237109560; 50°51′24″N 0°35′23″E		1191035	Upload Photo	Q26485781
Garden Cottage	II	10, Exmouth Place			14 September 1976	TQ8236509562; 50°51′25″N 0°35′23″E		1043535	Upload Photo	Q26295511
1 and 2, Garden Cottages	II	1 and 2, Garden Cottages, All Saints Street			14 September 1976	TQ8271009812; 50°51′32″N 0°35′41″E		1353143	Upload Photo	Q26636092
K6 Telephone Kiosk Adjacent to the Old Rectory	II	Harold Road			27 July 1988	TQ8283509995; 50°51′38″N 0°35′48″E		1353251	Upload Photo	Q26636196
No 2 (the Old Rectory) Including Garden Wall in Front	II	2, Harold Road			14 September 1976	TQ8281409900; 50°51′35″N 0°35′46″E		1043513	Upload Photo	Q26295489
Garden Wall, Gates And Gate Piers In Front And South East Of Old Hastings House	II	High Street			14 September 1976	TQ8275109951; 50°51′37″N 0°35′43″E		1043464	Upload Photo	Q26295437
The Old Brewery	II	High Street, TN34 3ER			14 September 1976	TQ8256409695; 50°51′29″N 0°35′33″E		1293392	Upload Photo	Q26581330
Old Hastings House	II*	High Street			19 January 1951	TQ8274609970; 50°51′37″N 0°35′43″E		1043462	Upload Photo	Q17555472
Raised Pavement Retaining Wall Along North West Side of High Street	II	High Street			14 September 1976	TQ8263109859; 50°51′34″N 0°35′37″E		1043466	Upload Photo	Q26295439
Torfield House	II	High Street			19 January 1951	TQ8276609973; 50°51′37″N 0°35′44″E		1043465	Upload Photo	Q26295438
Garden Wall North West of Old Hastings House	II	High Street			14 September 1976	TQ8272510010; 50°51′39″N 0°35′42″E		1043463	Upload Photo	Q26295436
Old Town Hall	II	High Street			19 January 1951	TQ8247009612; 50°51′26″N 0°35′28″E		1043489	Upload Photo	Q26295461
Roman Catholic Church of St Mary Star of the Sea	II	High Street			14 September 1976	TQ8268209871; 50°51′34″N 0°35′40″E		1191229	Upload Photo	Q23302363
1, High Street	II	1, High Street			14 September 1976	TQ8268409890; 50°51′35″N 0°35′40″E		1043514	Upload Photo	Q26295490
Kent House	II	4, High Street			14 September 1976	TQ8265209861; 50°51′34″N 0°35′38″E		1043515	Upload Photo	Q26295491
5, High Street	II	5, High Street			14 September 1976	TQ8264809854; 50°51′34″N 0°35′38″E		1353195	Upload Photo	Q26636142
6, High Street	II	6, High Street			19 January 1951	TQ8264909846; 50°51′33″N 0°35′38″E		1191254	Upload Photo	Q26485993
Holmdene	II	8, High Street			19 January 1951	TQ8262809827; 50°51′33″N 0°35′37″E		1043516	Upload Photo	Q26295492
9, High Street	II	9, High Street			14 September 1976	TQ8262309821; 50°51′33″N 0°35′37″E		1293408	Upload Photo	Q26581346
10, High Street	II	10, High Street			14 September 1976	TQ8261909816; 50°51′32″N 0°35′36″E		1353196	Upload Photo	Q26636143
11, High Street	II	11, High Street			14 September 1976	TQ8261509811; 50°51′32″N 0°35′36″E		1043517	Upload Photo	Q26295493
12 and 12a, High Street	II	12 and 12a, High Street			14 September 1976	TQ8261309804; 50°51′32″N 0°35′36″E		1293419	Upload Photo	Q26581357
13, High Street	II	13, High Street			14 September 1976	TQ8260909799; 50°51′32″N 0°35′36″E		1043518	Upload Photo	Q26295494
16, High Street	II	16, High Street			14 September 1976	TQ8259809788; 50°51′32″N 0°35′35″E		1353197	Upload Photo	Q26636144
17-19, High Street	II	17-19, High Street			14 September 1976	TQ8259509783; 50°51′31″N 0°35′35″E		1191289	Upload Photo	Q26486029
22 and 22a, High Street	II	22 and 22a, High Street			14 September 1976	TQ8258409768; 50°51′31″N 0°35′34″E		1043519	Upload Photo	Q26295495
The Laindons	II	23, High Street			19 January 1951	TQ8258009754; 50°51′31″N 0°35′34″E		1191295	Upload Photo	Q26486035
24 and 25, High Street	II	24 and 25, High Street			14 September 1976	TQ8257609751; 50°51′30″N 0°35′34″E		1353198	Upload Photo	Q26636145
Duke of Wellington Public House	II	29, High Street			14 September 1976	TQ8255809726; 50°51′30″N 0°35′33″E		1043520	Upload Photo	Q26295496
30, High Street	II	30, High Street			14 September 1976	TQ8255609722; 50°51′29″N 0°35′33″E		1191301	Upload Photo	Q26486040
31, High Street	II	31, High Street			19 March 2009	TQ8255409718; 50°51′29″N 0°35′33″E		1392918	Upload Photo	Q26672118
32, High Street	II	32, High Street			14 September 1976	TQ8255309712; 50°51′29″N 0°35′33″E		1043521	Upload Photo	Q26295497
33, High Street	II	33, High Street			14 September 1976	TQ8254609705; 50°51′29″N 0°35′32″E		1353199	Upload Photo	Q26636146
34 and 34a, High Street	II	34 and 34a, High Street			14 September 1976	TQ8254309697; 50°51′29″N 0°35′32″E		1043522	Upload Photo	Q26295498
35, High Street	II	35, High Street			14 September 1976	TQ8253909692; 50°51′29″N 0°35′32″E		1293396	Upload Photo	Q26581334
36 and 36a, High Street	II	36 and 36a, High Street			14 September 1976	TQ8253009689; 50°51′28″N 0°35′32″E		1353200	Upload Photo	Q26636147
38, High Street	II	38, High Street			19 January 1951	TQ8252909675; 50°51′28″N 0°35′31″E		1043523	Upload Photo	Q26295499
39, High Street	II	39, High Street			14 September 1976	TQ8252409669; 50°51′28″N 0°35′31″E		1293399	Upload Photo	Q26581337
Old Hastings Club	II	39a, High Street			19 January 1951	TQ8252109661; 50°51′28″N 0°35′31″E		1353220	Upload Photo	Q26636166
Nos 40 and 40a Including Area Railings	II	40 and 40a, High Street			14 September 1976	TQ8251709657; 50°51′27″N 0°35′31″E		1043480	Upload Photo	Q26295451
Bourneside	II	41, High Street			14 September 1976	TQ8251209648; 50°51′27″N 0°35′31″E		1353221	Upload Photo	Q26636167
42 and 42b, High Street	II	42 and 42b, High Street			14 September 1976	TQ8250009638; 50°51′27″N 0°35′30″E		1043481	Upload Photo	Q26295452
50, High Street	II	50, High Street			14 September 1976	TQ8248409590; 50°51′25″N 0°35′29″E		1043482	Upload Photo	Q26295454
51, High Street	II	51, High Street			14 September 1976	TQ8247709586; 50°51′25″N 0°35′29″E		1353182	Upload Photo	Q26636130
52 and 52a, High Street	II	52 and 52a, High Street			14 September 1976	TQ8247209579; 50°51′25″N 0°35′28″E		1043483	Upload Photo	Q26295455
53, High Street	II	53, High Street			14 September 1976	TQ8247409575; 50°51′25″N 0°35′28″E		1353183	Upload Photo	Q26636131
54, High Street	II	54, High Street			14 September 1976	TQ8246509572; 50°51′25″N 0°35′28″E		1043484	Upload Photo	Q26295456
56, High Street	II	56, High Street			14 September 1976	TQ8246409556; 50°51′24″N 0°35′28″E		1043485	Upload Photo	Q26295457
57, High Street	II	57, High Street			14 September 1976	TQ8245509550; 50°51′24″N 0°35′27″E		1043486	Upload Photo	Q26295458
60, 61 and 61a, High Street	II	60, 61 and 61a, High Street			14 September 1976	TQ8244409522; 50°51′23″N 0°35′27″E		1043487	Upload Photo	Q26295459
62a, High Street	II	62a, High Street			14 September 1976	TQ8242509537; 50°51′24″N 0°35′26″E		1191412	Upload Photo	Q26486143
Midland Bank	II	66, High Street			14 September 1976	TQ8245609593; 50°51′25″N 0°35′28″E		1043488	Upload Photo	Q26295460
67 and 68, High Street	II	67 and 68, High Street			14 September 1976	TQ8246009598; 50°51′26″N 0°35′28″E		1191423	Upload Photo	Q26486152
72, 72a, 72b and 73a, High Street	II	72, 72a, 72b and 73a, High Street			14 September 1976	TQ8248609648; 50°51′27″N 0°35′29″E		1043490	Upload Photo	Q26295462
73, High Street	II	73, High Street			14 September 1976	TQ8248809652; 50°51′27″N 0°35′29″E		1191427	Upload Photo	Q26486156
74 and 75, High Street	II	74 and 75, High Street			14 September 1976	TQ8249209659; 50°51′28″N 0°35′30″E		1043491	Upload Photo	Q26295463
76, 77 and 77a, High Street	II	76, 77 and 77a, High Street			14 September 1976	TQ8249409661; 50°51′28″N 0°35′30″E		1353184	Upload Photo	Q26636132
Nelson Buildings	II	78-81, High Street			19 January 1951	TQ8250909682; 50°51′28″N 0°35′30″E		1191432	Upload Photo	Q26486160
86 and 87, High Street	II	86 and 87, High Street			19 January 1951	TQ8253509721; 50°51′29″N 0°35′32″E		1043492	Upload Photo	Q26295464
88 and 89, High Street	II	88 and 89, High Street			14 September 1976	TQ8253409726; 50°51′30″N 0°35′32″E		1043493	Upload Photo	Q26295466
90, 90a and 90b, High Street	II	90, 90a and 90b, High Street			14 September 1976	TQ8254009737; 50°51′30″N 0°35′32″E		1191463	Upload Photo	Q26486189
91, High Street	II	91, High Street			19 January 1951	TQ8254309752; 50°51′30″N 0°35′32″E		1353185	Upload Photo	Q26636133
92, High Street	II	92, High Street			14 September 1976	TQ8254609755; 50°51′31″N 0°35′32″E		1191472	Upload Photo	Q26486198
93, High Street	II	93, High Street			14 September 1976	TQ8255109756; 50°51′31″N 0°35′33″E		1043494	Upload Photo	Q26295467
94, High Street	II	94, High Street			14 September 1976	TQ8254809764; 50°51′31″N 0°35′33″E		1353186	Upload Photo	Q26636134
95, High Street	II	95, High Street			14 September 1976	TQ8255109768; 50°51′31″N 0°35′33″E		1287048	Upload Photo	Q26575578
96, High Street	II	96, High Street			14 September 1976	TQ8255809766; 50°51′31″N 0°35′33″E		1043495	Upload Photo	Q26295468
97, High Street	II	97, High Street			19 January 1951	TQ8256109772; 50°51′31″N 0°35′33″E		1353187	Upload Photo	Q26636135
98, High Street	II	98, High Street			14 September 1976	TQ8256509777; 50°51′31″N 0°35′33″E		1191490	Upload Photo	Q26486216
99, High Street	II	99, High Street			14 September 1976	TQ8256409782; 50°51′31″N 0°35′33″E		1043496	Upload Photo	Q26295469
100, High Street	II	100, High Street			14 September 1976	TQ8256909783; 50°51′31″N 0°35′34″E		1287056	Upload Photo	Q26575586
100a, High Street	II	100a, High Street			14 September 1976	TQ8256409790; 50°51′32″N 0°35′33″E		1043497	Upload Photo	Q26295470
101, High Street	II	101, High Street			14 September 1976	TQ8256909788; 50°51′32″N 0°35′34″E		1353188	Upload Photo	Q26636136
102 and 103, High Street	II	102 and 103, High Street			19 January 1951	TQ8257909789; 50°51′32″N 0°35′34″E		1287059	Upload Photo	Q26575589
104a and 104b, High Street	II	104a and 104b, High Street			14 September 1976	TQ8257809807; 50°51′32″N 0°35′34″E		1353189	Upload Photo	Q26636137
104c, High Street	II	104c, High Street			14 September 1976	TQ8257209811; 50°51′32″N 0°35′34″E		1287025	Upload Photo	Q26575556
104, High Street	II	104, High Street			19 January 1951	TQ8258609798; 50°51′32″N 0°35′35″E		1043498	Upload Photo	Q26295471
St Annes Cottage	II	104d, High Street			14 September 1976	TQ8254909826; 50°51′33″N 0°35′33″E		1043499	Upload Photo	Q26295472
105, High Street	II	105, High Street			19 January 1951	TQ8259009806; 50°51′32″N 0°35′35″E		1287031	Upload Photo	Q26575562
St Clement's Rectory	II	106, High Street			19 January 1951	TQ8259409820; 50°51′33″N 0°35′35″E		1043500	Upload Photo	Q26295473
107, High Street	II	107, High Street			14 September 1976	TQ8260409836; 50°51′33″N 0°35′36″E		1353190	Upload Photo	Q26636138
108 and 109, High Street	II	108 and 109, High Street			19 January 1951	TQ8260809842; 50°51′33″N 0°35′36″E		1191532	Upload Photo	Q26486254
110a, High Street	II	110a, High Street			14 September 1976	TQ8261009846; 50°51′33″N 0°35′36″E		1353210	Upload Photo	Q26636156
110, High Street	II	110, High Street			14 September 1976	TQ8261109843; 50°51′33″N 0°35′36″E		1043457	Upload Photo	Q26295429
111a, High Street	II	111a, High Street			14 September 1976	TQ8257909860; 50°51′34″N 0°35′34″E		1353211	Upload Photo	Q26636157
111, High Street	II	111, High Street			14 September 1976	TQ8261509846; 50°51′33″N 0°35′36″E		1043458	Upload Photo	Q26295431
111 1/2, High Street	II	111 1/2, High Street			14 September 1976	TQ8258909870; 50°51′34″N 0°35′35″E		1043459	Upload Photo	Q26295433
Dickens Cottage	II	112, High Street			19 January 1951	TQ8262009854; 50°51′34″N 0°35′36″E		1043460	Upload Photo	Q26295434
Lionsdown House	II	116, High Street			19 January 1951	TQ8263709881; 50°51′35″N 0°35′37″E		1353212	Upload Photo	Q26636158
117 and 117a, High Street	II	117 and 117a, High Street			19 January 1951	TQ8264609888; 50°51′35″N 0°35′38″E		1043461	Upload Photo	Q26295435
118, High Street	II	118, High Street			19 January 1951	TQ8265609902; 50°51′35″N 0°35′38″E		1353213	Upload Photo	Q26636159
Norton Villa	II	Hill Street			14 September 1976	TQ8234109527; 50°51′23″N 0°35′22″E		1043474	Upload Photo	Q26295446
1-3, Hill Street	II	1-3, Hill Street			19 January 1951	TQ8241309588; 50°51′25″N 0°35′25″E		1353215	Upload Photo	Q26636161
Sea Gulls	II	8, Hill Street			14 September 1976	TQ8239309548; 50°51′24″N 0°35′24″E		1286995	Upload Photo	Q26575531
9, Hill Street	II	9, Hill Street			14 September 1976	TQ8239109546; 50°51′24″N 0°35′24″E		1043473	Upload Photo	Q26295445
10 and 11, Hill Street	II	10 and 11, Hill Street			14 September 1976	TQ8238809542; 50°51′24″N 0°35′24″E		1353216	Upload Photo	Q26636162
12 and 12a, Hill Street	II	12 and 12a, Hill Street			14 September 1976	TQ8238309533; 50°51′24″N 0°35′24″E		1191612	Upload Photo	Q26486326
Hill House	II	13, Hill Street			19 January 1951	TQ8236709534; 50°51′24″N 0°35′23″E		1286997	Upload Photo	Q26575533
Sycamores	II	14, Hill Street			14 September 1976	TQ8235709556; 50°51′24″N 0°35′22″E		1043475	Upload Photo	Q26295447
15-17, Hill Street	II	15-17, Hill Street			14 September 1976	TQ8237609548; 50°51′24″N 0°35′23″E		1353217	Upload Photo	Q26636163
22, Hill Street	II	22, Hill Street			14 September 1976	TQ8240009596; 50°51′26″N 0°35′25″E		1286998	Upload Photo	Q26575534
23, Hill Street	II	23, Hill Street			14 September 1976	TQ8240409600; 50°51′26″N 0°35′25″E		1043476	Upload Photo	Q26295448
Torfield Cottage	II	Old London Road			14 September 1976	TQ8280710024; 50°51′39″N 0°35′46″E		1353207	Upload Photo	Q26636154
Stables Immediately South West of Torfield Cottage	II	Old London Road			14 September 1976	TQ8279510011; 50°51′39″N 0°35′46″E		1286860	Upload Photo	Q26575411
1, Pleasant Row	II	1, Pleasant Row			14 September 1976	TQ8257309521; 50°51′23″N 0°35′33″E		1043414	Upload Photo	Q26295388
2 and 3, Pleasant Row	II	2 and 3, Pleasant Row			14 September 1976	TQ8256609522; 50°51′23″N 0°35′33″E		1353229	Upload Photo	Q26636175
4-6, Pleasant Row	II	4-6, Pleasant Row			14 September 1976	TQ8255609522; 50°51′23″N 0°35′33″E		1043415	Upload Photo	Q26295389
Sinnock Cottage	II	Sinnock Passage			14 September 1976	TQ8248109721; 50°51′30″N 0°35′29″E		1043431	Upload Photo	Q26295404
2, Sinnock Square	II	2, Sinnock Square			14 September 1976	TQ8250309694; 50°51′29″N 0°35′30″E		1286729	Upload Photo	Q26575293
3, Sinnock Square	II	3, Sinnock Square			14 September 1976	TQ8250309702; 50°51′29″N 0°35′30″E		1043432	Upload Photo	Q26295405
4, Sinnock Square	II	4, Sinnock Square			14 September 1976	TQ8250609701; 50°51′29″N 0°35′30″E		1353236	Upload Photo	Q26636181
6, Sinnock Square	II	6, Sinnock Square			14 September 1976	TQ8249609696; 50°51′29″N 0°35′30″E		1192155	Upload Photo	Q26486838
Churchyard Wall to South of St Clement's Church	II	Swan Terrace			14 September 1976	TQ8242509602; 50°51′26″N 0°35′26″E		1353237	Upload Photo	Q26636182
Church of St Clement	II*	Swan Terrace			19 January 1951	TQ8244409626; 50°51′27″N 0°35′27″E		1286732	Upload Photo	Q17555524
Silchester House	II	6, Swan Terrace			14 September 1976	TQ8242009592; 50°51′25″N 0°35′26″E		1043434	Upload Photo	Q26295407
Rosemary Cottage	II	Tackleway			14 September 1976	TQ8270509628; 50°51′26″N 0°35′40″E		1353252	Upload Photo	Q26636197
1-6 Trafalgar Cottages, Tackleway	II	1-6 Trafalgar Cottages, Tackleway			14 September 1976	TQ8270309618; 50°51′26″N 0°35′40″E		1043391	Upload Photo	Q26295362
7 and 8, Tackleway	II	7 and 8, Tackleway			14 September 1976	TQ8266509552; 50°51′24″N 0°35′38″E		1192174	Upload Photo	Q26486858
East Hill House	II	13, Tackleway			19 January 1951	TQ8267809578; 50°51′25″N 0°35′39″E		1043435	Upload Photo	Q26295408
20, Tackleway	II	20, Tackleway			14 September 1976	TQ8269709607; 50°51′26″N 0°35′40″E		1192195	Upload Photo	Q26486876
27, Tackleway	II	27, Tackleway			14 September 1976	TQ8274109665; 50°51′27″N 0°35′42″E		1043392	Upload Photo	Q26295364
Bentinck House	II	28, Tackleway			14 September 1976	TQ8274709668; 50°51′28″N 0°35′43″E		1353253	Upload Photo	Q26636198
32, Tackleway	II	32, Tackleway			14 September 1976	TQ8276209686; 50°51′28″N 0°35′43″E		1043393	Upload Photo	Q26295365
36, Tackleway	II	36, Tackleway			14 September 1976	TQ8277209711; 50°51′29″N 0°35′44″E		1353254	Upload Photo	Q26636199
Wellington	II	40, Tackleway			14 September 1976	TQ8278809731; 50°51′30″N 0°35′45″E		1043395	Upload Photo	Q26295367
45, Tackleway	II	45, Tackleway			14 September 1976	TQ8280809756; 50°51′30″N 0°35′46″E		1043396	Upload Photo	Q26295368
The Stables Theatre	II*	The Bourne, TN34 3BD			19 January 1951	TQ8271709894; 50°51′35″N 0°35′41″E		1353194	Upload Photo	Q17555559
Lord Nelson Public House	II	The Bourne			14 September 1976	TQ8257009527; 50°51′23″N 0°35′33″E		1043570	Upload Photo	Q26295555
Old Harbour Cottage	II	11, The Bourne			14 September 1976	TQ8253409542; 50°51′24″N 0°35′31″E		1043571	Upload Photo	Q26295556
17 and 19, The Bourne	II	17 and 19, The Bourne			14 September 1976	TQ8253809555; 50°51′24″N 0°35′32″E		1043572	Upload Photo	Q26295557
27-31, The Bourne	II	27-31, The Bourne			19 January 1951	TQ8254909584; 50°51′25″N 0°35′32″E		1043573	Upload Photo	Q26295558
Gilbert Cottages	II	75 and 77, The Bourne			14 September 1976	TQ8261909756; 50°51′31″N 0°35′36″E		1043574	Upload Photo	Q26295559
Croft House	II	The Croft			19 January 1951	TQ8251309859; 50°51′34″N 0°35′31″E		1190848	Upload Photo	Q26485596
Crofthaven	II	1, The Croft			19 January 1951	TQ8243309746; 50°51′30″N 0°35′27″E		1190833	Upload Photo	Q26485582
3, The Croft	II	3, The Croft			14 September 1976	TQ8243209751; 50°51′31″N 0°35′27″E		1043589	Upload Photo	Q26295577
Ravenswood	II	5 and 7, The Croft			19 January 1951	TQ8243409755; 50°51′31″N 0°35′27″E		1353152	Upload Photo	Q26636100
11, The Croft	II	11, The Croft			19 January 1951	TQ8244409767; 50°51′31″N 0°35′27″E		1190842	Upload Photo	Q26485590
12, The Croft	II	12, The Croft			14 September 1976	TQ8246309732; 50°51′30″N 0°35′28″E		1353153	Upload Photo	Q26636101
Abbotsford	II	17, The Croft			14 September 1976	TQ8245409783; 50°51′32″N 0°35′28″E		1043590	Upload Photo	Q26295578
19-23, The Croft	II	19-23, The Croft			14 September 1976	TQ8246609798; 50°51′32″N 0°35′28″E		1043591	Upload Photo	Q26295579
Keppel	II	48, The Croft			14 September 1976	TQ8252009805; 50°51′32″N 0°35′31″E		1043547	Upload Photo	Q26295526
50, The Croft	II	50, The Croft			14 September 1976	TQ8252909810; 50°51′32″N 0°35′32″E		1353172	Upload Photo	Q26636120
Croft Cottage	II	52, The Croft			14 September 1976	TQ8252909817; 50°51′33″N 0°35′32″E		1043548	Upload Photo	Q26295527
1, Waterloo Place	II	1, Waterloo Place, TN34 3AZ			14 September 1976	TQ8268409740; 50°51′30″N 0°35′39″E		1043606	Upload Photo	Q26295596
Light House	II	West Hill Recreation Ground			14 September 1976	TQ8236709716; 50°51′30″N 0°35′23″E		1043368	Upload Photo	Q67219604
Part of Town Wall in Winding Street and rear of flats known as Hastings Wall, East Street	II	Winding Street			19 January 1951	TQ8248209532; 50°51′23″N 0°35′29″E		1043382	Upload Photo	Q26295353
16, Winding Street	II	16, Winding Street			14 September 1976	TQ8253509536; 50°51′24″N 0°35′32″E		1286619	Upload Photo	Q26575200
2 and 4, Wood's Passage	II	2 and 4, Wood's Passage			14 September 1976	TQ8273409714; 50°51′29″N 0°35′42″E		1043383	Upload Photo	Q26295354
8, Wood's Passage	II	8, Wood's Passage			14 September 1976	TQ8274809704; 50°51′29″N 0°35′43″E		1286624	Upload Photo	Q26575205
10, Wood's Passage	II	10, Wood's Passage			14 September 1976	TQ8273309706; 50°51′29″N 0°35′42″E		1043394	Upload Photo	Q26295366
13, Wood's Passage	II	13, Wood's Passage			14 September 1976	TQ8274609718; 50°51′29″N 0°35′43″E		1043384	Upload Photo	Q26295356
Ebenezer House	II	21, Wood's Passage			14 September 1976	TQ8276509705; 50°51′29″N 0°35′44″E		1353247	Upload Photo	Q26636192
Ebenezer Cottage	II	23, Wood's Passage			14 September 1976	TQ8277009699; 50°51′29″N 0°35′44″E		1192435	Upload Photo	Q26487105

== See also ==
- Grade I listed buildings in East Sussex
- Grade II* listed buildings in East Sussex

== Sources ==
- Antram, Nicholas; Pevsner, Nikolaus (2012) [1965], Sussex: East, The Buildings of England, New Haven and London: Yale University Press, ISBN 978-0-300-18473-0
