= Listed buildings in Hastings (outside Old Town) =

Historic structures in East Sussex, England

Hastings is a town and borough in East Sussex, England. It contains one grade I, 23 grade II* and 546 grade II listed buildings that are recorded in the National Heritage List for England.

This list is based on the information retrieved online from Historic England.

The number of listed buildings in Hastings requires subdivision into geographically defined lists. This list includes all listed buildings outside Old Town.

== Key ==
| Grade | Criteria |
|---|---|
| I | Buildings that are of exceptional interest |
| II* | Particularly important buildings of more than special interest |
| II | Buildings that are of special interest |

== Listing ==
| Name | Grade | Location | Type | Completed (Note: The date given is the date used by Historic England as significant for the initial building or that of an important part in the structure's description.) | Date designated | Grid ref. (Note: The grid reference is based on the British national grid reference system, sometimes known as OSGB36, used by the Ordnance Survey.) Geo-coordinates | Notes | Entry number (Note: The "List Entry Number" is a unique number assigned to each listed building and scheduled monument by Historic England.) | Image | Wikidata |
|---|---|---|---|---|---|---|---|---|---|---|
| 5 and 6, Albert Road | II | 5 and 6, Albert Road | | | 14 September 1976 | TQ8180509470; 50°51′22″N 0°34′54″E | | 1353126 | Upload Photo | Q26636076 |
| 22-25, Alfred Street | II | 22-25, Alfred Street, St Leonards On Sea, TN38 0HD | | | 19 August 1974 | TQ8023409089; 50°51′12″N 0°33′33″E | | 1043624 | Upload Photo | Q26295615 |
| Archery Villas | II | Archery Road, St Leonards-on-sea | | | 14 September 1976 | TQ7975208954; 50°51′08″N 0°33′08″E | | 1043612 | Upload Photo | Q26295602 |
| Church of All Souls | II* | Athelstan Road, Clive Vale | | | 14 September 1976 | TQ8353710768; 50°52′02″N 0°36′25″E | | 1293681 | Upload Photo | Q4729650 |
| Number 1 | II | Bank Buildings, TN34 1GW | | | 19 April 2023 | TQ8167509437; 50°51′21″N 0°34′47″E | | 1484035 | Upload Photo | Q126688902 |
| Fishponds Farmhouse | II | Barley Lane | | | 14 September 1976 | TQ8440210884; 50°52′05″N 0°37′09″E | | 1353123 | Upload Photo | Q26636074 |
| Fairlight Place | II | Barley Lane, TN35 5DT, Fairlight | | | 19 January 1951 | TQ8491611315; 50°52′18″N 0°37′36″E | | 1293540 | Upload Photo | Q26581469 |
| Dairy at Beauport Home Farm (approximately 20 Metres to North East of Nos 2, 3 and 4) | II | Battle Road, St Leonards | | | 10 July 1981 | TQ7914312907; 50°53′16″N 0°32′44″E | | 1043387 | Upload Photo | Q26295359 |
| 9-23, Beauport Home Farm Close | II | 9-23, Beauport Home Farm Close, St Leonards On Sea, TN37 7BW | | | 10 July 1981 | TQ7907812874; 50°53′15″N 0°32′41″E | | 1353249 | Upload Photo | Q26636194 |
| Belmont House | II | Belmont Road, Belmont | | | 14 September 1976 | TQ8301510187; 50°51′44″N 0°35′57″E | | 1293687 | Upload Photo | Q26581601 |
| The Cupola | II* | Belmont Road, Belmont | | | 14 September 1976 | TQ8302910213; 50°51′45″N 0°35′58″E | | 1353124 | Upload Photo | Q17555548 |
| War Memorial in Alexandra Park | II | Bethune Way | | | 10 January 2002 | TQ8172710141; 50°51′44″N 0°34′51″E | | 1389636 | Upload Photo | Q26669069 |
| The Bull Inn | II | 530-534, Bexhill Road, Glyne Gap | | | 14 September 1976 | TQ7683008193; 50°50′46″N 0°30′38″E | | 1293690 | Upload Photo | Q26581604 |
| The Ice House | II | Bohemia Road, Hontye Park | | | 25 May 1999 | TQ8066209856; 50°51′36″N 0°33′56″E | | 1356865 | Upload Photo | Q26639484 |
| Roman Bath at the Summerfield Estate | II | Bohemia Road | | | 9 November 1999 | TQ8095209659; 50°51′29″N 0°34′11″E | | 1379434 | Upload Photo | Q26659684 |
| Bohemia Cottage | II | 1 and 2, Bohemia Road, Bohemia | | | 14 September 1976 | TQ8063109692; 50°51′31″N 0°33′54″E | | 1043614 | Upload Photo | Q26295604 |
| 77, 77a, 79 and 79a, Bohemia Road | II | 77, 77a, 79 and 79a, Bohemia Road, St Leonards On Sea | | | 22 April 2004 | TQ8023410128; 50°51′45″N 0°33′35″E | | 1390745 | Upload Photo | Q26670125 |
| 1-3, Burdett Place | II | 1-3, Burdett Place | | | 14 September 1976 | TQ8229609471; 50°51′22″N 0°35′19″E | | 1043575 | Upload Photo | Q26295561 |
| Burdett House | II | 4, Burdett Place | | | 14 September 1976 | TQ8229009480; 50°51′22″N 0°35′19″E | | 1043576 | Upload Photo | Q26295562 |
| Zion Cottage | II | 5, Burdett Place | | | 14 September 1976 | TQ8227909487; 50°51′22″N 0°35′18″E | | 1043577 | Upload Photo | Q26295563 |
| 6, Burdett Place | II | 6, Burdett Place | | | 19 December 1980 | TQ8228909461; 50°51′21″N 0°35′19″E | | 1043386 | Upload Photo | Q26295358 |
| United Reformed Church Formerly Congregational Church | II | Cambridge Road | | | 29 January 2010 | TQ8151709383; 50°51′20″N 0°34′39″E | | 1393646 | Upload Photo | Q26672796 |
| Croft Lodge | II | Campkin Gardens, St Leonards-on-sea, TN37 7FD | | | 19 January 1951 | TQ7910113153; 50°53′24″N 0°32′42″E | | 1043613 | Upload Photo | Q26295603 |
| Carlisle Parade Car Park Including the Subway, Entrance Ramps, Sunken Garden And Three Shelters | II | Carlisle Parade | | | 20 October 2011 | TQ8158409277; 50°51′16″N 0°34′42″E | | 1400579 | Upload Photo | Q26675430 |
| 6 and 7, Castle Cliff | II | 6 and 7, Castle Cliff | | | 14 September 1976 | TQ8201009513; 50°51′23″N 0°35′05″E | | 1043578 | Upload Photo | Q26295564 |
| 18a and 18b, Castle Hill Road | II | 18a and 18b, Castle Hill Road | | | 14 September 1976 | TQ8188809379; 50°51′19″N 0°34′58″E | | 1043582 | Upload Photo | Q26295567 |
| 46 and 48, Castle Hill Road | II | 46 and 48, Castle Hill Road | | | 14 September 1976 | TQ8197209480; 50°51′22″N 0°35′03″E | | 1293680 | Upload Photo | Q26581596 |
| 50 and 52, Castle Hill Road | II | 50 and 52, Castle Hill Road | | | 14 September 1976 | TQ8198109488; 50°51′23″N 0°35′03″E | | 1043580 | Upload Photo | Q26295565 |
| 54, Castle Hill Road | II | 54, Castle Hill Road | | | 19 January 1951 | TQ8198709496; 50°51′23″N 0°35′03″E | | 1293641 | Upload Photo | Q26581560 |
| 56, Castle Hill Road | II | 56, Castle Hill Road | | | 14 September 1976 | TQ8199309503; 50°51′23″N 0°35′04″E | | 1353145 | Upload Photo | Q26636093 |
| 58, Castle Hill Road | II | 58, Castle Hill Road | | | 19 January 1951 | TQ8199609509; 50°51′23″N 0°35′04″E | | 1043581 | Upload Photo | Q26295566 |
| 60, Castle Hill Road | II | 60, Castle Hill Road | | | 14 September 1976 | TQ8199809515; 50°51′23″N 0°35′04″E | | 1293643 | Upload Photo | Q26581562 |
| 62, Castle Hill Road | II | 62, Castle Hill Road | | | 14 September 1976 | TQ8200109519; 50°51′24″N 0°35′04″E | | 1353146 | Upload Photo | Q26636094 |
| 3, Castle Street | II | 3, Castle Street | | | 14 September 1976 | TQ8189009374; 50°51′19″N 0°34′58″E | | 1190764 | Upload Photo | Q26485514 |
| 5, Castle Street | II | 5, Castle Street | | | 14 September 1976 | TQ8188109378; 50°51′19″N 0°34′58″E | | 1353147 | Upload Photo | Q26636095 |
| 8, Castle Street | II | 8, Castle Street | | | 14 September 1976 | TQ8186509378; 50°51′19″N 0°34′57″E | | 1190768 | Upload Photo | Q26485519 |
| Church of St Leonard (baptist) | II | Chapel Park Road | | | 10 January 1991 | TQ8038809469; 50°51′24″N 0°33′42″E | | 1043367 | Upload Photo | Q7593976 |
| Church of St Leonard in the Wood | II | Church In The Wood Lane, Hollington | | | 19 January 1951 | TQ7866311375; 50°52′27″N 0°32′17″E | | 1353148 | Upload Photo | Q5116771 |
| Hastings Central Library | II | 13, Claremont, TN34 1HE | | | 15 April 1987 | TQ8142109354; 50°51′19″N 0°34′34″E | | 1043388 | Upload Photo | Q26295360 |
| 14 Claremont, Hastings | II | 14, Claremont, TN34 1HA | | | 15 April 1987 | TQ8142809365; 50°51′19″N 0°34′35″E | | 1353250 | Upload Photo | Q26636195 |
| Whitefriars | II | Collier Road | | | 14 September 1976 | TQ8241010161; 50°51′44″N 0°35′26″E | | 1043416 | Upload Photo | Q26295390 |
| The Former Priory Road School Buildings | II | Croft Road | | | 16 April 2002 | TQ8243110197; 50°51′45″N 0°35′27″E | | 1389521 | Upload Photo | Q26668954 |
| Mayfield Farmhouse | II | Crowhurst Road, Hollington | | | 2 August 1973 | TQ7771310993; 50°52′16″N 0°31′28″E | | 1353176 | Upload Photo | Q26636124 |
| Masonic Hall | II | East Ascent, St Leonards-on-sea, TN38 0DR | | | 19 January 1951 | TQ7989408871; 50°51′05″N 0°33′15″E | | 1043412 | Upload Photo | Q26295386 |
| 1 and 2, East Ascent | II | 1 and 2, East Ascent, St Leonards | | | 19 January 1951 | TQ7992608872; 50°51′05″N 0°33′17″E | | 1190918 | Upload Photo | Q26485673 |
| 3-5, East Ascent | II | 3-5, East Ascent, St Leonards | | | 14 September 1976 | TQ7994408867; 50°51′05″N 0°33′18″E | | 1043562 | Upload Photo | Q26295543 |
| 13-24, East Ascent | II | 13-24, East Ascent, St Leonards | | | 14 September 1976 | TQ8007008883; 50°51′05″N 0°33′24″E | | 1293565 | Upload Photo | Q26581491 |
| 3, East Beach Street | II | 3, East Beach Street | | | 14 September 1976 | TQ8248309491; 50°51′22″N 0°35′29″E | | 1353177 | Upload Photo | Q26636125 |
| 4, East Beach Street | II | 4, East Beach Street | | | 14 September 1976 | TQ8248909491; 50°51′22″N 0°35′29″E | | 1043563 | Upload Photo | Q26295545 |
| London Trader Public House | II | 5-7, East Beach Street | | | 14 September 1976 | TQ8249809498; 50°51′22″N 0°35′30″E | | 1293568 | Upload Photo | Q26581494 |
| 8-16, East Beach Street | II | 8-16, East Beach Street | | | 14 September 1976 | TQ8251609501; 50°51′22″N 0°35′30″E | | 1353178 | Upload Photo | Q26636126 |
| Bus Shelter | II | East Parade | | | 16 September 1999 | TQ8241409441; 50°51′21″N 0°35′25″E | | 1112998 | Upload Photo | Q26406909 |
| 1, East Parade | II | 1, East Parade | | | 14 September 1976 | TQ8230309414; 50°51′20″N 0°35′19″E | | 1043564 | Upload Photo | Q26295546 |
| 2, East Parade | II | 2, East Parade | | | 14 September 1976 | TQ8230909413; 50°51′20″N 0°35′20″E | | 1293577 | Upload Photo | Q26581502 |
| 4, East Parade | II | 4, East Parade | | | 14 September 1976 | TQ8231909417; 50°51′20″N 0°35′20″E | | 1043565 | Upload Photo | Q26295548 |
| 5, East Parade | II | 5, East Parade | | | 14 September 1976 | TQ8232109423; 50°51′20″N 0°35′20″E | | 1353179 | Upload Photo | Q26636127 |
| 6, East Parade | II | 6, East Parade | | | 14 September 1976 | TQ8232709427; 50°51′20″N 0°35′21″E | | 1190959 | Upload Photo | Q26485712 |
| 7, East Parade | II | 7, East Parade | | | 14 September 1976 | TQ8232909433; 50°51′20″N 0°35′21″E | | 1043566 | Upload Photo | Q26295549 |
| 8, East Parade | II | 8, East Parade | | | 14 September 1976 | TQ8233509434; 50°51′20″N 0°35′21″E | | 1190965 | Upload Photo | Q26485719 |
| 9, East Parade | II | 9, East Parade | | | 14 September 1976 | TQ8234109435; 50°51′20″N 0°35′21″E | | 1353180 | Upload Photo | Q26636128 |
| 10, East Parade | II | 10, East Parade | | | 14 September 1976 | TQ8234409441; 50°51′21″N 0°35′22″E | | 1043567 | Upload Photo | Q26295551 |
| 11, East Parade | II | 11, East Parade | | | 14 September 1976 | TQ8234909445; 50°51′21″N 0°35′22″E | | 1293547 | Upload Photo | Q26581476 |
| 14, East Parade | II | 14, East Parade, TN34 3AL | | | 14 September 1976 | TQ8236309461; 50°51′21″N 0°35′23″E | | 1353181 | Upload Photo | Q26636129 |
| 15 and 15a, East Parade | II | 15 and 15a, East Parade, TN34 3AL | | | 14 September 1976 | TQ8237509467; 50°51′21″N 0°35′23″E | | 1043568 | Upload Photo | Q26295553 |
| 16, East Parade | II | 16, East Parade, TN34 3AL | | | 14 September 1976 | TQ8238109469; 50°51′22″N 0°35′24″E | | 1190986 | Upload Photo | Q26485738 |
| 18, East Parade | II | 18, East Parade, TN34 3AL | | | 14 September 1976 | TQ8238709470; 50°51′22″N 0°35′24″E | | 1043569 | Upload Photo | Q26295554 |
| 18a, East Parade | II | 18a, East Parade, TN34 3AL | | | 14 September 1976 | TQ8239209472; 50°51′22″N 0°35′24″E | | 1191004 | Upload Photo | Q26485756 |
| 19, East Parade | II | 19, East Parade, TN34 3AL | | | 14 September 1976 | TQ8240409477; 50°51′22″N 0°35′25″E | | 1353201 | Upload Photo | Q26636148 |
| 20, East Parade | II | 20, East Parade, TN34 3AL | | | 14 September 1976 | TQ8241409479; 50°51′22″N 0°35′25″E | | 1043524 | Upload Photo | Q26295500 |
| The Towers | II | 11, Edward Road, St Leonards | | | 12 May 1978 | TQ8061409306; 50°51′18″N 0°33′53″E | | 1353248 | Upload Photo | Q26636193 |
| Oakdene | II | Elphinstone Road, Blacklands | | | 14 September 1976 | TQ8173810934; 50°52′10″N 0°34′53″E | | 1043528 | Upload Photo | Q26295504 |
| Church of St Helen | II | Elphinstone Road, St Helens | | | 19 January 1951 | TQ8205312093; 50°52′47″N 0°35′11″E | | 1043529 | Upload Photo | Q17674518 |
| Fairlight Lodge Hotel | II | Fairlight Road, Ore | | | 14 September 1976 | TQ8511011790; 50°52′33″N 0°37′47″E | | 1293508 | Upload Photo | Q26581439 |
| Sundial Cottage | II | 91, Fairlight Road, Ore | | | 14 September 1976 | TQ8401711535; 50°52′26″N 0°36′51″E | | 1043537 | Upload Photo | Q26295514 |
| 94 and 96, Fairlight Road | II | 94 and 96, Fairlight Road, Ore | | | 14 September 1976 | TQ8392811451; 50°52′24″N 0°36′46″E | | 1043536 | Upload Photo | Q26295513 |
| Including Attached Garden Walls and Steps and Railings and Gatepiers | II | 183, Frederick Road | | | 8 May 2002 | TQ8315711489; 50°52′26″N 0°36′07″E | | 1376637 | Upload Photo | Q26657171 |
| Hastings Arms Public House | II | George Street | | | 14 September 1976 | TQ8241509502; 50°51′23″N 0°35′25″E | | 1043538 | Upload Photo | Q26295515 |
| West Hill Lift | II | George Street | | | 14 September 1976 | TQ8223009429; 50°51′20″N 0°35′16″E | | 1043546 | Upload Photo | Q4109562 |
| 4, George Street | II | 4, George Street | | | 14 September 1976 | TQ8240409504; 50°51′23″N 0°35′25″E | | 1191067 | Upload Photo | Q26485810 |
| 5-7, George Street | II | 5-7, George Street | | | 14 September 1976 | TQ8239209500; 50°51′23″N 0°35′24″E | | 1353166 | Upload Photo | Q26636114 |
| 8, George Street | II | 8, George Street | | | 14 September 1976 | TQ8238309498; 50°51′22″N 0°35′24″E | | 1043539 | Upload Photo | Q26295516 |
| 9, George Street | II | 9, George Street | | | 14 September 1976 | TQ8237709497; 50°51′22″N 0°35′23″E | | 1293519 | Upload Photo | Q26581449 |
| 10-12, George Street | II | 10-12, George Street | | | 14 September 1976 | TQ8236909492; 50°51′22″N 0°35′23″E | | 1043540 | Upload Photo | Q26295518 |
| The Anchor Inn | II | 13, George Street | | | 14 September 1976 | TQ8235509482; 50°51′22″N 0°35′22″E | | 1353167 | Upload Photo | Q26636115 |
| 15, 16 and 16a, George Street | II | 15, 16 and 16a, George Street | | | 14 September 1976 | TQ8234609475; 50°51′22″N 0°35′22″E | | 1293484 | Upload Photo | Q26581418 |
| 21 and 22, George Street | II | 21 and 22, George Street | | | 14 September 1976 | TQ8232509452; 50°51′21″N 0°35′21″E | | 1043541 | Upload Photo | Q26295519 |
| 23, George Street | II | 23, George Street | | | 14 September 1976 | TQ8231809448; 50°51′21″N 0°35′20″E | | 1191096 | Upload Photo | Q26485837 |
| 24a, 25 and 25a, George Street | II | 24a, 25 and 25a, George Street | | | 14 September 1976 | TQ8230409439; 50°51′21″N 0°35′20″E | | 1353168 | Upload Photo | Q26636116 |
| 26, George Street | II | 26, George Street | | | 14 September 1976 | TQ8229509432; 50°51′20″N 0°35′19″E | | 1043542 | Upload Photo | Q26295520 |
| 27, George Street | II | 27, George Street | | | 14 September 1976 | TQ8228909426; 50°51′20″N 0°35′19″E | | 1293488 | Upload Photo | Q26581421 |
| 28, George Street | II | 28, George Street | | | 14 September 1976 | TQ8228509424; 50°51′20″N 0°35′19″E | | 1043543 | Upload Photo | Q26295521 |
| 29, George Street | II | 29, George Street | | | 14 September 1976 | TQ8227709421; 50°51′20″N 0°35′18″E | | 1353169 | Upload Photo | Q26636117 |
| 30, George Street | II | 30, George Street | | | 14 September 1976 | TQ8227109420; 50°51′20″N 0°35′18″E | | 1191109 | Upload Photo | Q26485850 |
| 31, George Street | II | 31, George Street | | | 14 September 1976 | TQ8226709418; 50°51′20″N 0°35′18″E | | 1043544 | Upload Photo | Q26295522 |
| 32, George Street | II | 32, George Street | | | 14 September 1976 | TQ8226209414; 50°51′20″N 0°35′17″E | | 1191116 | Upload Photo | Q26485857 |
| 36 and 37, George Street | II | 36 and 37, George Street | | | 14 September 1976 | TQ8221909405; 50°51′20″N 0°35′15″E | | 1353170 | Upload Photo | Q26636118 |
| 41, George Street | II | 41, George Street | | | 14 September 1976 | TQ8220809421; 50°51′20″N 0°35′15″E | | 1043545 | Upload Photo | Q26295524 |
| 42, George Street | II | 42, George Street | | | 14 September 1976 | TQ8221809422; 50°51′20″N 0°35′15″E | | 1191124 | Upload Photo | Q26485866 |
| 43a 44 45, George Street | II | 43a 44 45, George Street | | | 14 September 1976 | TQ8224509426; 50°51′20″N 0°35′16″E | | 1043501 | Upload Photo | Q26295474 |
| 43, George Street | II | 43, George Street | | | 14 September 1976 | TQ8222509428; 50°51′20″N 0°35′15″E | | 1353171 | Upload Photo | Q26636119 |
| 45a, George Street | II | 45a, George Street | | | 14 September 1976 | TQ8225809430; 50°51′20″N 0°35′17″E | | 1353191 | Upload Photo | Q26636139 |
| 46, George Street | II | 46, George Street | | | 14 September 1976 | TQ8226309436; 50°51′21″N 0°35′17″E | | 1043502 | Upload Photo | Q26295476 |
| 50, George Street | II | 50, George Street | | | 14 September 1976 | TQ8228009451; 50°51′21″N 0°35′18″E | | 1043503 | Upload Photo | Q26295477 |
| 51, George Street | II | 51, George Street | | | 31 October 2008 | TQ8228509458; 50°51′21″N 0°35′19″E | | 1392970 | Upload Photo | Q26672166 |
| 52-55, George Street | II | 52-55, George Street | | | 14 September 1976 | TQ8230209464; 50°51′21″N 0°35′19″E | | 1353192 | Upload Photo | Q26636140 |
| 56, 56a, 57 and 57a, George Street | II | 56, 56a, 57 and 57a, George Street, TN34 3EE | | | 14 September 1976 | TQ8230109481; 50°51′22″N 0°35′19″E | | 1043504 | Upload Photo | Q26295479 |
| 58, George Street | II | 58, George Street | | | 14 September 1976 | TQ8231609480; 50°51′22″N 0°35′20″E | | 1353193 | Upload Photo | Q26636141 |
| 59, George Street | II | 59, George Street | | | 14 September 1976 | TQ8232009484; 50°51′22″N 0°35′20″E | | 1043505 | Upload Photo | Q26295480 |
| Mount House | II | 59a, George Street | | | 14 September 1976 | TQ8230209506; 50°51′23″N 0°35′20″E | | 1043506 | Upload Photo | Q26295481 |
| 62 and 63, George Street | II | 62 and 63, George Street | | | 14 September 1976 | TQ8234109494; 50°51′22″N 0°35′22″E | | 1043507 | Upload Photo | Q26295482 |
| Old Pump House Public House | II | 64, George Street | | | 19 January 1951 | TQ8234809504; 50°51′23″N 0°35′22″E | | 1043508 | Upload Photo | Q26295483 |
| 68, George Street | II | 68, George Street | | | 14 September 1976 | TQ8237209514; 50°51′23″N 0°35′23″E | | 1043509 | Upload Photo | Q26295484 |
| Drinking Fountain to North of 'Ronaldsway' | II | Gillsman's Hill, St Leonards On Sea | | | 10 January 2002 | TQ7916210305; 50°51′52″N 0°32′41″E | | 1389635 | Upload Photo | Q26669068 |
| Rose Cottage | II | Gillsman's Hill, Hollington | | | 14 September 1976 | TQ7958410208; 50°51′49″N 0°33′02″E | | 1043510 | Upload Photo | Q26295485 |
| Chievely Cottages | II | 5 and 6, Gillsman's Hill, Hollington | | | 14 September 1976 | TQ7955910194; 50°51′48″N 0°33′01″E | | 1191169 | Upload Photo | Q26485909 |
| James Burton Monument | II | Gloucester Lodge, Quarry Hill, St Leonards On Sea, TN38 0HG, St Leonards | | | 19 January 1951 | TQ7985209086; 50°51′12″N 0°33′14″E | | 1286757 | Upload Photo | Q26575320 |
| Burton Memorial Stone | II | Grand Parade, St Leonards | | | 14 September 1976 | TQ8024008872; 50°51′05″N 0°33′33″E | | 1043512 | Upload Photo | Q26295487 |
| Adelaide House | II | 23, Grand Parade, St Leonards | | | 14 September 1976 | TQ8040208944; 50°51′07″N 0°33′41″E | | 1043511 | Upload Photo | Q26295486 |
| Filsham Farmhouse | II | Harley Shute Road, Harley Shute | | | 19 January 1951 | TQ7834809576; 50°51′29″N 0°31′58″E | | 1191207 | Upload Photo | Q26485946 |
| The Havelock Public House | II | 27, Havelock Road | | | 9 August 1996 | TQ8163909414; 50°51′21″N 0°34′46″E | | 1268280 | Upload Photo | Q26558603 |
| Windycroft | II* | High Wickham | | | 14 September 1976 | TQ8299810001; 50°51′38″N 0°35′56″E | | 1043472 | Upload Photo | Q17555478 |
| Minnis Rock | II | 1, High Wickham | | | 19 January 1951 | TQ8301110152; 50°51′43″N 0°35′57″E | | 1043467 | Upload Photo | Q87346012 |
| Villa Julia | II | 3, High Wickham | | | 14 September 1976 | TQ8300010126; 50°51′42″N 0°35′56″E | | 1191587 | Upload Photo | Q26486302 |
| 6, High Wickham | II | 6, High Wickham | | | 14 September 1976 | TQ8299810108; 50°51′41″N 0°35′56″E | | 1043468 | Upload Photo | Q26295440 |
| 7, High Wickham | II | 7, High Wickham | | | 14 September 1976 | TQ8299810102; 50°51′41″N 0°35′56″E | | 1043469 | Upload Photo | Q26295442 |
| 9, High Wickham | II | 9, High Wickham | | | 14 September 1976 | TQ8299710090; 50°51′41″N 0°35′56″E | | 1191592 | Upload Photo | Q26486307 |
| 10, High Wickham | II | 10, High Wickham | | | 14 September 1976 | TQ8299710078; 50°51′41″N 0°35′56″E | | 1043470 | Upload Photo | Q26295443 |
| 11, High Wickham | II | 11, High Wickham | | | 14 September 1976 | TQ8299610069; 50°51′40″N 0°35′56″E | | 1353214 | Upload Photo | Q26636160 |
| 12, High Wickham | II | 12, High Wickham | | | 14 September 1976 | TQ8299410050; 50°51′40″N 0°35′56″E | | 1286986 | Upload Photo | Q26575523 |
| 13, High Wickham | II | 13, High Wickham | | | 14 September 1976 | TQ8299310041; 50°51′39″N 0°35′56″E | | 1043471 | Upload Photo | Q26295444 |
| 14, High Wickham | II | 14, High Wickham | | | 14 September 1976 | TQ8299210035; 50°51′39″N 0°35′56″E | | 1191597 | Upload Photo | Q26486312 |
| Nos 3 to 6 (consecutive) Including Garden Retaining Wall to East | II | 3-6, Highlands Gardens, St Leonards | | | 14 September 1976 | TQ7957409116; 50°51′13″N 0°32′59″E | | 1191214 | Upload Photo | Q26485953 |
| 1-10, Highlands Mews | II | 1-10, Highlands Mews, St Leonards | | | 14 September 1976 | TQ7954008936; 50°51′07″N 0°32′57″E | | 1353142 | Upload Photo | Q26636091 |
| Ruin of St Mary's Chapel | II | Hythe Avenue, Bulverhythe | | | 19 January 1951 | TQ7680908266; 50°50′49″N 0°30′37″E | | 1353218 | Upload Photo | Q17647147 |
| Christ Church | II* | Laton Road, Blacklands | | | 14 September 1976 | TQ8148610651; 50°52′01″N 0°34′40″E | | 1286964 | Upload Photo | Q17555534 |
| Congregational Church of St Leonard,Including Attached Walls And Piers | II | London Road, St Leonards On Sea | | | 10 September 2003 | TQ8022009245; 50°51′17″N 0°33′33″E | | 1390718 | Upload Photo | Q7594015 |
| Renaissance House | II | London Road, St Leonards-on-sea, TN37 6AN | | | 10 October 1990 | TQ8026009116; 50°51′12″N 0°33′35″E | | 1043390 | Upload Photo | Q26295361 |
| Training College, Former Convent Of The Holy Child Jesus | II | Magdalen Road, St Leonards-on-sea | | | 14 August 2006 | TQ8072109171; 50°51′14″N 0°33′58″E | | 1391734 | Upload Photo | Q26671087 |
| Gate Lodge and Gateway to the Former Convent of the Holy Child Jesus | II | Magdalen Road, St Leonards | | | 14 August 2006 | TQ8071109197; 50°51′15″N 0°33′58″E | | 1391736 | Upload Photo | Q26671089 |
| Former Convent Building to the North West of Chapel at the Former Convent of the Holy Child Jesus | II | Magdalen Road, St Leonards-on-sea | | | 14 September 1976 | TQ8071609301; 50°51′18″N 0°33′58″E | | 1191639 | Upload Photo | Q26486351 |
| Chapel to the Former Convent of the Holy Child Jesus | II* | Magdalen Road, St Leonards-on-sea | | | 14 September 1976 | TQ8076109226; 50°51′15″N 0°34′00″E | | 1043478 | Upload Photo | Q95217042 |
| Church of St Thomas of Canterbury and the English Martyrs | II | Magdalen Road | | | 13 December 2006 | TQ8060909467; 50°51′23″N 0°33′53″E | | 1391831 | Upload Photo | Q5117736 |
| 31 Old Penny School House, 31a and 31b, 31, 31a and 31b, Magdalen Road | II | 31 Old Penny School House, 31a and 31b, 31, Magdalen Road | | | 14 September 1976 | TQ8062209428; 50°51′22″N 0°33′54″E | | 1353219 | Upload Photo | Q26636165 |
| Royal Victoria Hotel | II | Marina, St Leonards On Sea, TN38 0BD, St Leonards | | | 14 September 1976 | TQ7989908831; 50°51′04″N 0°33′16″E | | 1286976 | Upload Photo | Q26575513 |
| Marine Court | II | Marina, St Leonards On Sea, TN38 0DX | | | 9 November 1999 | TQ8007608843; 50°51′04″N 0°33′25″E | | 1379435 | Upload Photo | Q26659685 |
| Eastern Colonnade | II | 40a and 36-44, Marina, St Leonards On Sea, TN38 0BU, St Leonards | | | 19 January 1951 | TQ7997608831; 50°51′04″N 0°33′20″E | | 1043479 | Upload Photo | Q26295450 |
| Western Colonnade | II | 48-53, Marina, St Leonards On Sea, TN38 0BG, St Leonards | | | 19 January 1951 | TQ7983208823; 50°51′03″N 0°33′12″E | | 1353238 | Upload Photo | Q26636183 |
| Crown House | II* | 57, Marina, St Leonards On Sea, TN38 0BE, St Leonards | | | 19 January 1951 | TQ7976908817; 50°51′03″N 0°33′09″E | | 1043436 | Upload Photo | Q17555459 |
| 111-114, Marina | II | 111-114, Marina, St Leonards On Sea, TN38 0BN, St Leonards | | | 14 September 1976 | TQ7933008782; 50°51′03″N 0°32′46″E | | 1353239 | Upload Photo | Q26636184 |
| 115 and 116, Marina | II | 115 and 116, Marina, St Leonards On Sea, TN38 0BN, St Leonards | | | 14 September 1976 | TQ7930708779; 50°51′03″N 0°32′45″E | | 1043437 | Upload Photo | Q26295409 |
| 117-118, Marina | II | 117-118, Marina, St Leonards On Sea, TN38 0BN, St Leonards | | | 14 September 1976 | TQ7928608778; 50°51′03″N 0°32′44″E | | 1353240 | Upload Photo | Q26636185 |
| 119 and 120, Marina | II | 119 and 120, Marina, St Leonards-on-sea, TN38 0BN, St Leonards | | | 14 September 1976 | TQ7927408776; 50°51′03″N 0°32′44″E | | 1043438 | Upload Photo | Q26295411 |
| 121-127, Marina | II | 121-127, Marina, St Leonards-on-sea, TN38 0BN, St Leonards | | | 14 September 1976 | TQ7926808775; 50°51′03″N 0°32′43″E | | 1043439 | Upload Photo | Q26295412 |
| 10 and 11, Marine Parade | II | 10 and 11, Marine Parade | | | 14 September 1976 | TQ8222909402; 50°51′20″N 0°35′16″E | | 1353202 | Upload Photo | Q26636149 |
| Cast iron boundary post in Market Passage | II | Market Passage | | | 28 November 2013 | TQ8021308922; 50°51′06″N 0°33′32″E | | 1416724 | Upload Photo | Q26676538 |
| 1, Market Passage | II | 1, Market Passage | | | 14 September 1976 | TQ8235309470; 50°51′22″N 0°35′22″E | | 1043440 | Upload Photo | Q26295413 |
| 1-20, Markwick Terrace | II | 1-20, Markwick Terrace, St Leonards | | | 14 September 1976 | TQ7975909720; 50°51′33″N 0°33′10″E | | 1353203 | Upload Photo | Q26636150 |
| Guestling Lodge | II | 7, Martineau Lane, Bachelor's Bump | | | 14 September 1976 | TQ8424512473; 50°52′57″N 0°37′04″E | | 1043441 | Upload Photo | Q26295414 |
| The Clock House | II* | Maze Hill, St Leonards | | | 19 January 1951 | TQ7992409053; 50°51′11″N 0°33′17″E | | 1043443 | Upload Photo | Q17555462 |
| St Leonard's Lodge | II | Maze Hill, St Leonards | | | 14 September 1976 | TQ7989809207; 50°51′16″N 0°33′16″E | | 1043449 | Upload Photo | Q26295422 |
| South Lodge (comprising East and West Lodges) | II | Maze Hill, St Leonards | | | 19 January 1951 | TQ7989408899; 50°51′06″N 0°33′15″E | | 1043442 | Upload Photo | Q26295415 |
| The Uplands | II | 1-6, Maze Hill, St Leonards | | | 14 September 1976 | TQ7993409137; 50°51′14″N 0°33′18″E | | 1191850 | Upload Photo | Q26486553 |
| 2, Maze Hill | II | 2, Maze Hill, St Leonards | | | 14 September 1976 | TQ7995108879; 50°51′05″N 0°33′18″E | | 1043444 | Upload Photo | Q26295416 |
| 3, Maze Hill | II | 3, Maze Hill, St Leonards | | | 14 September 1976 | TQ7994708889; 50°51′05″N 0°33′18″E | | 1043445 | Upload Photo | Q26295417 |
| 4, Maze Hill | II | 4, Maze Hill, St Leonards | | | 14 September 1976 | TQ7994308897; 50°51′06″N 0°33′18″E | | 1191811 | Upload Photo | Q26486515 |
| 5, Maze Hill | II | 5, Maze Hill, St Leonards | | | 14 September 1976 | TQ7994208910; 50°51′06″N 0°33′18″E | | 1043446 | Upload Photo | Q26295418 |
| 6, Maze Hill | II | 6, Maze Hill, St Leonards | | | 14 September 1976 | TQ7994108921; 50°51′07″N 0°33′18″E | | 1043447 | Upload Photo | Q26295419 |
| 9-12, Maze Hill | II | 9-12, Maze Hill, St Leonards | | | 14 September 1976 | TQ7994308954; 50°51′08″N 0°33′18″E | | 1286864 | Upload Photo | Q26575414 |
| 13, Maze Hill | II | 13, Maze Hill, St Leonards | | | 14 September 1976 | TQ7994409004; 50°51′09″N 0°33′18″E | | 1043448 | Upload Photo | Q26295421 |
| North Lodge | II | 16, Maze Hill, St Leonards | | | 19 January 1951 | TQ7981309225; 50°51′17″N 0°33′12″E | | 1353204 | Upload Photo | Q26636151 |
| Winterbourne | II | 18, Maze Hill, St Leonards | | | 14 September 1976 | TQ7979909196; 50°51′16″N 0°33′11″E | | 1191767 | Upload Photo | Q26486471 |
| Cast iron boundary post on Maze Hill Terrace | II | Maze Hill Terrace | | | 28 November 2013 | TQ7994709033; 50°51′10″N 0°33′18″E | | 1416730 | Upload Photo | Q26676542 |
| 1-4, Maze Hill Terrace | II | 1-4, Maze Hill Terrace | | | 23 July 1992 | TQ7997909008; 50°51′09″N 0°33′20″E | | 1353256 | Upload Photo | Q26636201 |
| Horse and Groom Public House | II | 4, Mercatoria | | | 14 September 1976 | TQ8008508929; 50°51′07″N 0°33′25″E | | 1286877 | Upload Photo | Q26575426 |
| Cast iron boundary post on Mount Pleasan | II | Mount Pleasan | | | 28 November 2013 | TQ8017408909; 50°51′06″N 0°33′30″E | | 1416733 | Upload Photo | Q26676543 |
| 66 and 68, Norman Road | II | 66 and 68, Norman Road, St Leonards | | | 14 September 1976 | TQ8020308932; 50°51′07″N 0°33′31″E | | 1353205 | Upload Photo | Q26636152 |
| 74, Norman Road | II | 74, Norman Road, St Leonards | | | 14 September 1976 | TQ8018108926; 50°51′06″N 0°33′30″E | | 1191887 | Upload Photo | Q26486586 |
| 16-23, North Street | II | 16-23, North Street, St Leonards On Sea, TN38 0EY, St Leonards | | | 19 August 1974 | TQ8016609022; 50°51′10″N 0°33′30″E | | 1043452 | Upload Photo | Q26295425 |
| 25 and 26, North Street | II | 25 and 26, North Street, St Leonards On Sea, TN38 0EY, St Leonards | | | 19 August 1974 | TQ8016909043; 50°51′10″N 0°33′30″E | | 1353206 | Upload Photo | Q26636153 |
| 27 and 28, North Street | II | 27 and 28, North Street, St Leonards On Sea, TN38 0EY, St Leonards | | | 19 August 1974 | TQ8017709053; 50°51′11″N 0°33′30″E | | 1191893 | Upload Photo | Q26486593 |
| 33 and 34, North Street | II | 33 and 34, North Street, St Leonards On Sea, TN38 0EX, St Leonards | | | 19 August 1974 | TQ8021509061; 50°51′11″N 0°33′32″E | | 1043453 | Upload Photo | Q26295426 |
| 25, Offa Road | II | 25, Offa Road, TN35 5HR, Ore | | | 14 September 1976 | TQ8366911309; 50°52′20″N 0°36′33″E | | 1353164 | Upload Photo | Q26636112 |
| 1-12, 12a and 12b, Pelham Arcade | II* | 1-12, 12a and 12b, Pelham Arcade, Pelham Place | | | 3 May 1988 | TQ8201609386; 50°51′19″N 0°35′05″E | | 1043389 | Upload Photo | Q17555452 |
| Church of St Mary in the Castle | II* | Pelham Crescent | | | 19 January 1951 | TQ8201309415; 50°51′20″N 0°35′05″E | | 1353209 | Upload Photo | Q17555564 |
| 1-8, Pelham Crescent | II* | 1-8, Pelham Crescent | | | 19 January 1951 | TQ8204009398; 50°51′20″N 0°35′06″E | | 1191926 | Upload Photo | Q17555491 |
| 7 and 8, Pelham Place | II* | 7 and 8, Pelham Place | | | 19 January 1951 | TQ8207509386; 50°51′19″N 0°35′08″E | | 1191986 | Upload Photo | Q17555496 |
| 9a, Pelham Place | II | 9a, Pelham Place | | | 14 September 1976 | TQ8205809388; 50°51′19″N 0°35′07″E | | 1353228 | Upload Photo | Q26636174 |
| Marianne House | II | Old London Road | | | 9 November 1990 | TQ8292510336; 50°51′49″N 0°35′53″E | | 1353255 | Upload Photo | Q26636200 |
| Christ Church | II | Old London Road, Ore | | | 14 September 1976 | TQ8361211315; 50°52′20″N 0°36′30″E | | 1043454 | Upload Photo | Q5108706 |
| 41, Old London Road | II | 41, Old London Road, Ore | | | 14 September 1976 | TQ8289510218; 50°51′45″N 0°35′51″E | | 1353208 | Upload Photo | Q26636155 |
| The Briars | II | 47, Old London Road, Ore | | | 14 September 1976 | TQ8291810201; 50°51′45″N 0°35′52″E | | 1191917 | Upload Photo | Q26486618 |
| The Brooklands | II | 61, Old London Road, Ore | | | 14 September 1976 | TQ8301410282; 50°51′47″N 0°35′57″E | | 1043455 | Upload Photo | Q26295427 |
| Old Holloway House | II | 65, Old London Road, Ore | | | 14 September 1976 | TQ8290910233; 50°51′46″N 0°35′52″E | | 1043456 | Upload Photo | Q26295428 |
| Outside Christ Church | II | 458 Old London Rd, Ore, TN35 5BG | | | 9 October 2018 | TQ8360311291; 50°52′19″N 0°36′29″E | | 1460004 | Upload Photo | Q57581706 |
| Wellington Terrace | II | 1-11, Portland Place | | | 14 September 1976 | TQ8192509617; 50°51′27″N 0°35′00″E | | 1353230 | Upload Photo | Q26636176 |
| Bannow | II | Quarry Hill, St Leonards | | | 14 September 1976 | TQ7976309030; 50°51′10″N 0°33′09″E | | 1353232 | Upload Photo | Q26636178 |
| Allegria Court | II | Quarry Hill, St Leonards | | | 23 June 1975 | TQ7984809028; 50°51′10″N 0°33′13″E | | 1353231 | Upload Photo | Q26636177 |
| Gloucester Lodge | II | Quarry Hill, St Leonards On Sea, TN38 0HG | | | 14 September 1976 | TQ7981209139; 50°51′14″N 0°33′12″E | | 1043417 | Upload Photo | Q26295391 |
| Archway over Carriage Drive to North West of Allegria Court Including Retaining Walls Along Drive | II | Quarry Hill, St Leonards | | | 14 September 1976 | TQ7981609059; 50°51′11″N 0°33′12″E | | 1043418 | Upload Photo | Q26295392 |
| Cast iron boundary post on Quarry Hill | II | Quarry Hill | | | 28 November 2013 | TQ7981808919; 50°51′07″N 0°33′12″E | | 1416728 | Upload Photo | Q26676541 |
| The Town Hall | II | Queen Street, TN34 1QR | | | 13 January 1999 | TQ8173609489; 50°51′23″N 0°34′51″E | | 1245060 | Upload Photo | Q26537633 |
| Railway Bridge | II | Queens Road | | | 14 September 1976 | TQ8191110146; 50°51′44″N 0°35′01″E | | 1043419 | Upload Photo | Q26295394 |
| Queens Arcade | II | Queens Road, TN34 1PA | | | 28 November 2022 | TQ8175609442; 50°51′21″N 0°34′52″E | | 1476965 | Upload Photo | Q122214020 |
| Holy Trinity Parish Church | II* | Robertson Street, TN34 1HT | | | 14 September 1976 | TQ8146109340; 50°51′18″N 0°34′36″E | | 1043423 | Upload Photo | Q5886505 |
| 21 Robertson Street, Hastings | II | 21, Robertson Street, TN34 1HL | | | 24 October 1996 | TQ8154209353; 50°51′19″N 0°34′40″E | | 1268148 | Upload Photo | Q26558491 |
| Former Memorial Photographic Studios | II | 52 and 52b, Robertson Street And 7 Cambridge Road | | | 18 February 2010 | TQ8160609392; 50°51′20″N 0°34′44″E | | 1393677 | Upload Photo | Q26672825 |
| East Well (at Base of East Hill Lift) | II | Rock-a-nore Road | | | 14 September 1976 | TQ8271309511; 50°51′22″N 0°35′41″E | | 1286777 | Upload Photo | Q26575338 |
| Net and Tackle Stores on Beach Including Groups L to W (consecutive) | II* | Rock-a-nore Road | | | 14 September 1976 | TQ8267109488; 50°51′22″N 0°35′38″E | | 1192092 | Upload Photo | Q17555513 |
| Fishing Net and Tackle Store (immediately West of the Net Shop Jellied Eel Bar) | II | Rock-a-nore Road | | | 14 September 1976 | TQ8261409506; 50°51′22″N 0°35′35″E | | 1192072 | Upload Photo | Q26486761 |
| Bus Shelter | II | Rock-a-nore Road | | | 16 September 1999 | TQ8258109482; 50°51′22″N 0°35′34″E | | 1112999 | Upload Photo | Q26406910 |
| East Hill Lift | II | Rock-a-nore Road | | | 14 September 1976 | TQ8272209520; 50°51′23″N 0°35′41″E | | 1043427 | Upload Photo | Q4204299 |
| Lavender House | II | Rock-a-nore Road | | | 19 January 1951 | TQ8260809517; 50°51′23″N 0°35′35″E | | 1043424 | Upload Photo | Q26295398 |
| Aylesbury Cottage | II | 10, Rock-a-nore Road | | | 14 September 1976 | TQ8263309509; 50°51′23″N 0°35′36″E | | 1043425 | Upload Photo | Q26295399 |
| 21 and 22, Rock-a-nore Road | II | 21 and 22, Rock-a-nore Road | | | 14 September 1976 | TQ8267809513; 50°51′23″N 0°35′39″E | | 1043426 | Upload Photo | Q26295401 |
| Hastings Fishermen's Museum | II | 21, Rock-a-nore Road, TH34 3DW | | | 14 September 1976 | TQ8276409501; 50°51′22″N 0°35′43″E | | 1043428 | Upload Photo | Q15223257 |
| 4 and 6, Russell Street | II | 4 and 6, Russell Street | | | 14 September 1976 | TQ8181609488; 50°51′23″N 0°34′55″E | | 1353233 | Upload Photo | Q26636179 |
| 8, Russell Street | II | 8, Russell Street | | | 14 September 1976 | TQ8181909492; 50°51′23″N 0°34′55″E | | 1286752 | Upload Photo | Q26575315 |
| 10, Russell Street | II | 10, Russell Street | | | 14 September 1976 | TQ8182209495; 50°51′23″N 0°34′55″E | | 1043429 | Upload Photo | Q26295403 |
| 12, Russell Street | II | 12, Russell Street | | | 14 September 1976 | TQ8182409499; 50°51′23″N 0°34′55″E | | 1353234 | Upload Photo | Q26636180 |
| Christ Church | II* | Silchester Road, St Leonards On Sea, TN38 0JB | | | 14 September 1976 | TQ8024309148; 50°51′14″N 0°33′34″E | | 1286965 | Upload Photo | Q5108715 |
| 1-9, Speckled Wood | II | 1-9, Speckled Wood, Ore | | | 14 September 1976 | TQ8324211316; 50°52′20″N 0°36′11″E | | 1353165 | Upload Photo | Q26636113 |
| Undercliff | II | St Leonards On Sea, TN38 0NA | | | 25 September 1998 | TQ7969508848; 50°51′04″N 0°33′05″E | | 1376621 | Upload Photo | Q7593989 |
| Priory at the Former Convent of the Holy Child Jesus | II | St Margaret's Road, St Leonards-on-sea | | | 14 August 2006 | TQ8085009148; 50°51′13″N 0°34′05″E | | 1391735 | Upload Photo | Q26671088 |
| Church of St Mary Magdalene | II | St Margaret's Road, St Leonards | | | 14 September 1976 | TQ8064009102; 50°51′12″N 0°33′54″E | | 1043430 | Upload Photo | Q7594582 |
| Original Lighting Column Opposite 3 St Mary's Terrace | II | St Mary's Terrace | | | 11 November 2002 | TQ8219109873; 50°51′35″N 0°35′15″E | | 1096113 | Upload Photo | Q26388407 |
| Original Lighting Column Opposite 12 St Mary's Terrace | II | St Mary's Terrace | | | 11 November 2002 | TQ8218209922; 50°51′36″N 0°35′14″E | | 1096112 | Upload Photo | Q26388406 |
| Original Lighting Column Opposite 22 St Mary's Terrace | II | St Mary's Terrace | | | 11 November 2002 | TQ8217709985; 50°51′38″N 0°35′14″E | | 1096111 | Upload Photo | Q26388405 |
| Church of St Matthew | II* | St Matthews Road, Silverhill | | | 14 September 1976 | TQ7992110459; 50°51′56″N 0°33′20″E | | 1192138 | Upload Photo | Q7594703 |
| Church of St Peter | II* | St Peter's Road, Bohemia | | | 14 September 1976 | TQ8035809934; 50°51′39″N 0°33′41″E | | 1353235 | Upload Photo | Q7595289 |
| 2 Albany Road, St. Leonards-on-sea | II | 2 Albany Road, St. Leonards-on-sea, TN38 0LN | | | 13 July 2012 | TQ7965309327; 50°51′20″N 0°33′04″E | | 1409493 | Upload Photo | Q26676099 |
| Lift shaft and winding mechanism to the rear of 40 to 41 White Rock | II | St. Michaels Place TN34 1JT | | | 20 September 1996 | TQ8137009277; 50°51′16″N 0°34′32″E | | 1268253 | Upload Photo | Q26558577 |
| 1-14 (consecutive), Stanhope Place | II | 1-14 (consecutive), Stanhope Place, St Leonards-on-sea | | | 14 September 1976 | TQ8000308948; 50°51′07″N 0°33′21″E | | 1043433 | Upload Photo | Q26295406 |
| 1-10, The Lawn | II | 1-10, The Lawn, St Leonards | | | 14 September 1976 | TQ8004409023; 50°51′10″N 0°33′23″E | | 1043477 | Upload Photo | Q26295449 |
| Mount Lodge | II | The Mount, St Leonards | | | 14 September 1976 | TQ7964909083; 50°51′12″N 0°33′03″E | | 1043450 | Upload Photo | Q26295423 |
| 1-6, The Mount | II | 1-6, The Mount, St Leonards | | | 14 September 1976 | TQ7968809093; 50°51′12″N 0°33′05″E | | 1043451 | Upload Photo | Q26295424 |
| 7, The Mount | II | 7, The Mount, St Leonards | | | 14 September 1976 | TQ7972509096; 50°51′12″N 0°33′07″E | | 1286881 | Upload Photo | Q26575429 |
| Beauport Lodge (east and West) Gate Including Gatepiers and Gates to East of Beauport Lodge | II | The Ridge, Baldslow | | | 14 September 1976 | TQ7952713353; 50°53′30″N 0°33′05″E | | 1043421 | Upload Photo | Q26295396 |
| Great Ridge | II | The Ridge, Baldslow | | | 14 September 1976 | TQ8172712538; 50°53′02″N 0°34′56″E | | 1192017 | Upload Photo | Q26486710 |
| Holmhurst St Mary's School | II | The Ridge, Baldslow | | | 14 September 1976 | TQ8030412918; 50°53′15″N 0°33′44″E | | 1043422 | Upload Photo | Q26295397 |
| Statue of Queen Anne South East of Holmhurst St Mary's School | II* | The Ridge, Baldslow | | | 14 September 1976 | TQ8039912891; 50°53′14″N 0°33′48″E | | 1192060 | Upload Photo | Q17555502 |
| Little Ridge Farmhouse | II | 551, The Ridge, Baldslow | | | 14 September 1976 | TQ8085512756; 50°53′10″N 0°34′11″E | | 1192034 | Upload Photo | Q26486727 |
| Baldslow Windmill | II | 784, The Ridge, Baldslow | | | 14 September 1976 | TQ8002913108; 50°53′22″N 0°33′30″E | | 1043420 | Upload Photo | Q26295395 |
| 36, Tilekiln Lane | II | 36, Tilekiln Lane, Ore | | | 14 September 1976 | TQ8441711436; 50°52′23″N 0°37′11″E | | 1353222 | Upload Photo | Q26636168 |
| | II | Trinity Street, TN34 1HG | | | 14 September 1976 | TQ8149409349; 50°51′19″N 0°34′38″E | | 1043397 | Upload Photo | Q26295369 |
| 1-8, Undercliff Terrace | II | 1-8, Undercliff Terrace, St Leonards | | | 14 September 1976 | TQ8018408898; 50°51′06″N 0°33′30″E | | 1043398 | Upload Photo | Q26295370 |
| 1-3, Union Street | II | 1-3, Union Street, St Leonards On Sea, TN38 0HA, St Leonards | | | 19 August 1974 | TQ8021409072; 50°51′11″N 0°33′32″E | | 1043399 | Upload Photo | Q26295372 |
| Church of St John the Evangelist | II* | Upper Maze Hill, St Leonards | | | 14 September 1976 | TQ7978509369; 50°51′21″N 0°33′11″E | | 1043400 | Upload Photo | Q7593795 |
| Cast iron boundary post on Upper Maze Hill | II | Upper Maze Hill | | | 28 November 2013 | TQ7979909243; 50°51′17″N 0°33′11″E | | 1416727 | Upload Photo | Q26676540 |
| Baston Lodge | II | 1, Upper Maze Hill, St Leonards | | | 14 March 1973 | TQ7979909292; 50°51′19″N 0°33′11″E | | 1192209 | Upload Photo | Q26486888 |
| Queen Victoria Memorial Statue | II | Warrior Square, St Leonards | | | 14 September 1976 | TQ8053008978; 50°51′08″N 0°33′48″E | | 1192217 | Upload Photo | Q26486896 |
| Baptist Church | II* | Wellington Square | | | 19 January 1951 | TQ8181709457; 50°51′22″N 0°34′55″E | | 1286663 | Upload Photo | Q94999777 |
| 1 and 2, Wellington Square | II | 1 and 2, Wellington Square | | | 19 January 1951 | TQ8187009417; 50°51′20″N 0°34′57″E | | 1286690 | Upload Photo | Q26575262 |
| Mornington Mansions | II | 1a, Wellington Square | | | 14 September 1976 | TQ8185909408; 50°51′20″N 0°34′57″E | | 1043401 | Upload Photo | Q26295373 |
| 3 and 4, Wellington Square | II | 3 and 4, Wellington Square | | | 19 January 1951 | TQ8188209426; 50°51′21″N 0°34′58″E | | 1043402 | Upload Photo | Q26295374 |
| 5, Wellington Square | II | 5, Wellington Square | | | 19 January 1951 | TQ8188409434; 50°51′21″N 0°34′58″E | | 1043403 | Upload Photo | Q26295375 |
| 6-9, Wellington Square | II | 6-9, Wellington Square | | | 19 January 1951 | TQ8188609439; 50°51′21″N 0°34′58″E | | 1192253 | Upload Photo | Q26486928 |
| 10-13, Wellington Square | II | 10-13, Wellington Square | | | 19 January 1951 | TQ8190009455; 50°51′22″N 0°34′59″E | | 1043404 | Upload Photo | Q26295376 |
| 14-17, Wellington Square | II | 14-17, Wellington Square | | | 19 January 1951 | TQ8192409481; 50°51′22″N 0°35′00″E | | 1192257 | Upload Photo | Q26486932 |
| 18, Wellington Square | II | 18, Wellington Square | | | 19 January 1951 | TQ8192809486; 50°51′23″N 0°35′00″E | | 1043405 | Upload Photo | Q26295377 |
| 19, Wellington Square | II | 19, Wellington Square | | | 19 January 1951 | TQ8193309489; 50°51′23″N 0°35′01″E | | 1353223 | Upload Photo | Q26636169 |
| 20, Wellington Square | II | 20, Wellington Square | | | 19 January 1951 | TQ8193709494; 50°51′23″N 0°35′01″E | | 1192262 | Upload Photo | Q26486937 |
| 22, Wellington Square | II | 22, Wellington Square | | | 19 January 1951 | TQ8193609514; 50°51′23″N 0°35′01″E | | 1043406 | Upload Photo | Q26295378 |
| 23, Wellington Square | II | 23, Wellington Square | | | 19 January 1951 | TQ8193109518; 50°51′24″N 0°35′01″E | | 1043407 | Upload Photo | Q26295379 |
| 24, Wellington Square | II | 24, Wellington Square | | | 19 January 1951 | TQ8192609522; 50°51′24″N 0°35′00″E | | 1192271 | Upload Photo | Q26486945 |
| 25, Wellington Square | II | 25, Wellington Square | | | 19 January 1951 | TQ8192109526; 50°51′24″N 0°35′00″E | | 1353224 | Upload Photo | Q26636170 |
| 26 and 27, Wellington Square | II | 26 and 27, Wellington Square | | | 19 January 1951 | TQ8191709529; 50°51′24″N 0°35′00″E | | 1286704 | Upload Photo | Q26575274 |
| 28, Wellington Square | II | 28, Wellington Square | | | 19 January 1951 | TQ8190609536; 50°51′24″N 0°34′59″E | | 1043408 | Upload Photo | Q26295380 |
| 29, Wellington Square | II | 29, Wellington Square | | | 19 January 1951 | TQ8190209539; 50°51′24″N 0°34′59″E | | 1353225 | Upload Photo | Q26636171 |
| 30 and 31, Wellington Square | II | 30 and 31, Wellington Square | | | 19 January 1951 | TQ8189509546; 50°51′25″N 0°34′59″E | | 1192277 | Upload Photo | Q26486951 |
| 32 and 33, Wellington Square | II | 32 and 33, Wellington Square | | | 19 January 1951 | TQ8186709538; 50°51′24″N 0°34′57″E | | 1043409 | Upload Photo | Q26295381 |
| 36-40, Wellington Square | II | 36-40, Wellington Square | | | 19 January 1951 | TQ8185509517; 50°51′24″N 0°34′57″E | | 1043410 | Upload Photo | Q26295382 |
| 41-43, Wellington Square | II | 41-43, Wellington Square | | | 19 January 1951 | TQ8184409497; 50°51′23″N 0°34′56″E | | 1192281 | Upload Photo | Q26486955 |
| 44, Wellington Square | II | 44, Wellington Square | | | 19 January 1951 | TQ8183709487; 50°51′23″N 0°34′56″E | | 1353226 | Upload Photo | Q26636172 |
| 45, Wellington Square | II | 45, Wellington Square | | | 19 January 1951 | TQ8183209481; 50°51′23″N 0°34′55″E | | 1286660 | Upload Photo | Q26575238 |
| 46, Wellington Square | II | 46, Wellington Square | | | 19 January 1951 | TQ8183009477; 50°51′22″N 0°34′55″E | | 1043411 | Upload Photo | Q26295383 |
| 47, Wellington Square | II | 47, Wellington Square | | | 19 January 1951 | TQ8182609473; 50°51′22″N 0°34′55″E | | 1353227 | Upload Photo | Q26636173 |
| 4, West Ascent | II | 4, West Ascent, St Leonards | | | 14 September 1976 | TQ7984108861; 50°51′05″N 0°33′13″E | | 1043413 | Upload Photo | Q26295387 |
| 5 and 6, West Ascent | II | 5 and 6, West Ascent, St Leonards | | | 14 September 1976 | TQ7983008861; 50°51′05″N 0°33′12″E | | 1353241 | Upload Photo | Q26636186 |
| Burton Tomb | II | West Hill Road, St Leonards | | | 14 September 1976 | TQ7973708871; 50°51′05″N 0°33′07″E | | 1353244 | Upload Photo | Q26636189 |
| The Bath House | II | West Hill Road, St Leonards On Sea, TN38 0NA | | | 27 November 2006 | TQ7984308886; 50°51′06″N 0°33′13″E | | 1392240 | Upload Photo | Q26671473 |
| 14, West Hill Road | II | 14, West Hill Road, St Leonards | | | 14 September 1976 | TQ7973408911; 50°51′06″N 0°33′07″E | | 1043369 | Upload Photo | Q26295338 |
| 16, West Hill Road | II | 16, West Hill Road, St Leonards | | | 14 September 1976 | TQ7971208916; 50°51′07″N 0°33′06″E | | 1353242 | Upload Photo | Q26636187 |
| No 18 Including Garden Boundary Wall to South and West | II | 18, West Hill Road, St Leonards | | | 14 September 1976 | TQ7969808916; 50°51′07″N 0°33′05″E | | 1043370 | Upload Photo | Q26295340 |
| No 20 (west Hill Lodge) Including Gate Piers to South West | II | 20, West Hill Road, St Leonards | | | 14 September 1976 | TQ7965708912; 50°51′07″N 0°33′03″E | | 1353243 | Upload Photo | Q26636188 |
| No 22 Including Garden Boundary Wall to South | II | 22, West Hill Road, St Leonards | | | 14 September 1976 | TQ7963208914; 50°51′07″N 0°33′02″E | | 1043371 | Upload Photo | Q26295341 |
| West Hill Court | II | 24, West Hill Road, St Leonards | | | 14 September 1976 | TQ7960108914; 50°51′07″N 0°33′00″E | | 1043372 | Upload Photo | Q26295342 |
| 1, West Street | II | 1, West Street | | | 14 September 1976 | TQ8229109419; 50°51′20″N 0°35′19″E | | 1043373 | Upload Photo | Q26295343 |
| 2, West Street | II | 2, West Street | | | 14 September 1976 | TQ8229409421; 50°51′20″N 0°35′19″E | | 1353245 | Upload Photo | Q26636190 |
| 6, West Street | II | 6, West Street | | | 14 September 1976 | TQ8230909435; 50°51′20″N 0°35′20″E | | 1043374 | Upload Photo | Q26295344 |
| 7, West Street | II | 7, West Street | | | 14 September 1976 | TQ8231309439; 50°51′21″N 0°35′20″E | | 1286607 | Upload Photo | Q26575189 |
| 15, West Street | II | 15, West Street | | | 14 September 1976 | TQ8234809464; 50°51′21″N 0°35′22″E | | 1043375 | Upload Photo | Q26295345 |
| The Little House | II | 19a, West Street | | | 14 September 1976 | TQ8239309486; 50°51′22″N 0°35′24″E | | 1353246 | Upload Photo | Q26636191 |
| The Queen Adelaide Public House | II | 20, West Street | | | 14 September 1976 | TQ8240409490; 50°51′22″N 0°35′25″E | | 1192406 | Upload Photo | Q26487076 |
| 21, West Street | II | 21, West Street | | | 14 September 1976 | TQ8241109487; 50°51′22″N 0°35′25″E | | 1043376 | Upload Photo | Q26295346 |
| 30, West Street | II | 30, West Street | | | 14 September 1976 | TQ8234009445; 50°51′21″N 0°35′21″E | | 1043377 | Upload Photo | Q26295348 |
| 33, West Street | II | 33, West Street | | | 14 September 1976 | TQ8231809427; 50°51′20″N 0°35′20″E | | 1043378 | Upload Photo | Q26295349 |
| Boer War Memorial | II | White Rock | | | 11 November 2009 | TQ8123009155; 50°51′13″N 0°34′24″E | | 1393520 | Upload Photo | Q26672677 |
| Hastings Pier | II | White Rock | | | 14 September 1976 | TQ8115909061; 50°51′10″N 0°34′20″E | | 1192411 | Upload Photo | Q5680420 |
| 16-20, White Rock | II | 16-20, White Rock | | | 14 September 1976 | TQ8126609206; 50°51′14″N 0°34′26″E | | 1043379 | Upload Photo | Q26295350 |
| 21 and 22, White Rock | II | 21 and 22, White Rock | | | 19 January 1951 | TQ8129209217; 50°51′15″N 0°34′27″E | | 1043380 | Upload Photo | Q26295351 |
| 23 and 24, White Rock | II | 23 and 24, White Rock | | | 19 January 1951 | TQ8130209221; 50°51′15″N 0°34′28″E | | 1286616 | Upload Photo | Q26575197 |
| Palace Court Including Former Arthur Green | II | 34 White Rock, White Rock | | | 23 April 2010 | TQ8136109250; 50°51′16″N 0°34′31″E | | 1393761 | Upload Photo | Q26672905 |
| 40 and 41, White Rock | II | 40 and 41, White Rock | | | 14 September 1976 | TQ8140009273; 50°51′16″N 0°34′33″E | | 1043381 | Upload Photo | Q26295352 |
| 3, York Buildings | II | 3, York Buildings | | | 14 September 1976 | TQ8178409402; 50°51′20″N 0°34′53″E | | 1043385 | Upload Photo | Q26295357 |
| 12 and 13, York Buildings | II | 12 and 13, York Buildings | | | 14 September 1976 | TQ8173509415; 50°51′20″N 0°34′50″E | | 1286590 | Upload Photo | Q26575172 |

== See also ==
- Grade I listed buildings in East Sussex
- Grade II* listed buildings in East Sussex

== Sources ==
- Antram, Nicholas; Pevsner, Nikolaus (2012) [1965], Sussex: East, The Buildings of England, New Haven and London: Yale University Press, ISBN 978-0-300-18473-0
