= Listed buildings in Wadhurst =

Civil Parish in East Sussex, England

Wadhurst is a village and civil parish in the Wealden District, East Sussex, England. It contains two grade I, six grade II* and 148 grade II listed buildings that are recorded in the National Heritage List for England.

This list is based on the information retrieved online from Historic England.

== Key ==
Grade	Criteria
I	Buildings that are of exceptional interest
II*	Particularly important buildings of more than special interest
II	Buildings that are of special interest

== Listing ==
Name	Grade	Location	Type	Completed (Note: The date given is the date used by Historic England as significant for the initial building or that of an important part in the structure's description.)	Date designated	Grid ref. (Note: The grid reference is based on the British national grid reference system, sometimes known as OSGB36, used by the Ordnance Survey.) Geo-coordinates	Notes	Entry number (Note: The "List Entry Number" is a unique number assigned to each listed building and scheduled monument by Historic England.)	Image	Wikidata
Bartley Mill Oast House	II	Bayham Road			11 June 1986	TQ6327935627; 51°05′48″N 0°19′50″E		1027985	Upload Photo	Q26278958
Bartley Mill Stables	II	Bayham Road			11 June 1986	TQ6328235604; 51°05′47″N 0°19′50″E		1252484	Upload Photo	Q26544342
Bartley Mill	II	Bayham Road			31 December 1982	TQ6324835574; 51°05′46″N 0°19′48″E		1353525	Upload Photo	Q26636444
Two Barns to the South East of Skinner's House	II	Best Beech Hill			31 December 1982	TQ6078331256; 51°03′29″N 0°17′34″E		1028094	Upload Photo	Q26279100
Skinner's House	II	Best Beech Hill			26 November 1953	TQ6076531282; 51°03′30″N 0°17′34″E		1194533	Upload Photo	Q26489155
Walland	II*	Brinker's Lane			26 November 1953	TQ6414430171; 51°02′51″N 0°20′25″E		1194538	Upload Photo	Q17556909
Former Stables at Wadhurst College	II	Bruce Manor Close, TN5 6FH			7 October 2009	TQ6226631540; 51°03′37″N 0°18′51″E		1393466	Upload Photo	Q26672624
Former Wadhurst College	II	Bruce Manor Close, TN5 6FH			7 October 2009	TQ6234431551; 51°03′37″N 0°18′55″E		1393467	Upload Photo	Q26672625
Buckhurst Manor	II	Buckhurst Lane			31 December 1982	TQ6108932519; 51°04′10″N 0°17′52″E		1028095	Upload Photo	Q26279101
Wessons	II	Buckhurst Lane			31 December 1982	TQ6076131675; 51°03′43″N 0°17′34″E		1194542	Upload Photo	Q26489163
Stowage and Roundels about 30 Yards North West of Buckhurst Manor	II	Buckhurst Lane			7 August 1986	TQ6107132550; 51°04′11″N 0°17′51″E		1252490	Upload Photo	Q26544346
Bucklandhill Farmhouse	II	Buckland Hill			31 December 1982	TQ6432534080; 51°04′57″N 0°20′41″E		1028096	Upload Photo	Q26279103
The Parish Church of St Peter and St Paul	I	Church Street			26 November 1953	TQ6407131871; 51°03′46″N 0°20′24″E		1028097	The Parish Church of St Peter and St Paul More images	Q17535303
The White House	II	Church Street			18 April 1973	TQ6406031819; 51°03′44″N 0°20′24″E		1028099	The White House More images	Q26279105
Twitten Cottage	II	Church Street			31 December 1982	TQ6408331797; 51°03′43″N 0°20′25″E		1028100	Upload Photo	Q26279106
Little Warren Cottage	II	Church Street, TN5 6FQ			31 December 1982	TQ6411431763; 51°03′42″N 0°20′26″E		1194565	Little Warren Cottage More images	Q26489186
Church Gate House	II	Church Street			26 November 1953	TQ6408131826; 51°03′44″N 0°20′25″E		1285641	Church Gate House More images	Q26574316
Church House	II	Church Street			31 December 1982	TQ6407531816; 51°03′44″N 0°20′24″E		1285646	Upload Photo	Q26574321
1-5, Church Street	II	1-5, Church Street			31 December 1982	TQ6403331829; 51°03′45″N 0°20′22″E		1028098	1-5, Church Street More images	Q26279104
Crouch Cottage	II	Churchsettle Lane			31 December 1982	TQ6400828965; 51°02′12″N 0°20′16″E		1194548	Upload Photo	Q26489169
Oast 15 Metres East of Hunters Hall	II	Cousley Wood, TN5 6QX			7 October 1986	TQ6560434089; 51°04′56″N 0°21′47″E		1027987	Upload Photo	Q26278960
Quarry Cottages	II	Cousley Wood			31 December 1982	TQ6510533309; 51°04′31″N 0°21′20″E		1028101	Upload Photo	Q26279107
Owlers	II	Cousley Wood			31 December 1982	TQ6522633466; 51°04′36″N 0°21′26″E		1028102	Upload Photo	Q26279108
Langham Farmhouse	II	Cousley Wood			31 December 1982	TQ6562633701; 51°04′43″N 0°21′47″E		1028103	Upload Photo	Q26279109
Upper Verds and Croft Cottage	II	Cousley Wood, TN5 6EY			31 December 1982	TQ6519833399; 51°04′34″N 0°21′25″E		1194581	Upload Photo	Q26489201
Hunters Hall	II	Cousley Wood			26 November 1953	TQ6558234098; 51°04′56″N 0°21′45″E		1194600	Upload Photo	Q26489218
Beaver Cottage	II	Cousley Wood			31 December 1982	TQ6514833367; 51°04′33″N 0°21′22″E		1285613	Upload Photo	Q26574291
Corner Cottage	II	Cousley Wood			31 December 1982	TQ6513233432; 51°04′35″N 0°21′21″E		1285621	Upload Photo	Q26574299
The Old Vine Public House	II	Cousley Wood			31 December 1982	TQ6510233374; 51°04′33″N 0°21′20″E		1353633	Upload Photo	Q26636544
Lucks Farmhouse	II	Cousley Wood			31 December 1982	TQ6524733378; 51°04′33″N 0°21′27″E		1353634	Upload Photo	Q26636545
Pell Green Cottage	II	Cousley Wood Road, Pell Green, TN5 6EF			31 December 1982	TQ6451433076; 51°04′24″N 0°20′49″E		1028081	Upload Photo	Q26279083
Premises Occupied by E R Hickmott and Son Funeral Directors,Dirgate Mowers, And J Bassett, Wheelwrights	II	Durgates			31 December 1982	TQ6327032193; 51°03′57″N 0°19′44″E		1028104	Upload Photo	Q26279111
Pear Tree Cottage	II	Durgates			31 December 1982	TQ6328732213; 51°03′58″N 0°19′45″E		1194608	Upload Photo	Q26489226
Lantern Cottage	II	Durgates			31 December 1982	TQ6326232230; 51°03′58″N 0°19′43″E		1353635	Upload Photo	Q26636546
Faircrouch	II	Faircrouch Lane			31 December 1982	TQ6193232960; 51°04′23″N 0°18′36″E		1194621	Upload Photo	Q26489239
Barn to the North West of Faircrouch	II	Faircrough Lane			31 December 1982	TQ6186632986; 51°04′24″N 0°18′33″E		1353636	Upload Photo	Q26636547
Cherry Tree Cottage	II	Fairglen Road			31 December 1982	TQ6195531726; 51°03′43″N 0°18′35″E		1285601	Upload Photo	Q26574280
Foxhole	II	Foxhole Lane			31 December 1982	TQ6525631797; 51°03′42″N 0°21′25″E		1028105	Upload Photo	Q26279112
Oasthouses and Granary to the North of the Foxhole	II	Foxhole Lane			31 December 1982	TQ6528531844; 51°03′44″N 0°21′26″E		1353637	Upload Photo	Q26636548
The Garden Wall of Hill House to the South West of the House	II	High Street			31 December 1982	TQ6380831965; 51°03′49″N 0°20′11″E		1028067	Upload Photo	Q26279066
Braidwood	II	High Street			31 December 1982	TQ6374631975; 51°03′50″N 0°20′08″E		1028068	Upload Photo	Q26279067
The Cottage,Pump Cottage, Hillview, Oak Cottage And Novam	II	High Street, TN5 6AA			31 December 1982	TQ6390231886; 51°03′47″N 0°20′16″E		1028069	Upload Photo	Q26279068
Spring Cottage and the Mallows	II	High Street, TN5 6AP			31 December 1982	TQ6409531744; 51°03′42″N 0°20′25″E		1028070	Spring Cottage and the Mallows More images	Q26279070
Wing Art Galley and Carillion Cottage	II	High Street, TN5 6AA			31 December 1982	TQ6399631849; 51°03′45″N 0°20′20″E		1028106	Wing Art Galley and Carillion Cottage More images	Q26279113
Osborne House (t S Burkinshaw and Company Limited Anthony Reece-jones, Solicitor And The Flat Over),	II	High Street			31 December 1982	TQ6397731868; 51°03′46″N 0°20′19″E		1028107	Osborne House (t S Burkinshaw and Company Limited Anthony Reece-jones, Solicitor And The Flat Over), More images	Q26279114
The Garden Wall of the Vicarage to the South of the House	II	High Street			31 December 1982	TQ6393231888; 51°03′47″N 0°20′17″E		1028108	Upload Photo	Q26279115
Peter Nash. Wallpaper And Paints, And The Old Bakery	II	High Street			31 December 1982	TQ6398531859; 51°03′46″N 0°20′20″E		1194642	Peter Nash. Wallpaper And Paints, And The Old Bakery More images	Q26489258
Gordon House and Newington Stores	II	High Street, TN5 6AA			31 December 1982	TQ6395531876; 51°03′46″N 0°20′18″E		1194650	Gordon House and Newington Stores More images	Q26489266
The Vicarage	II*	High Street			26 November 1953	TQ6394231906; 51°03′47″N 0°20′18″E		1194656	The Vicarage More images	Q17556917
The Post House	II	High Street			31 December 1982	TQ6400831839; 51°03′45″N 0°20′21″E		1285602	The Post House More images	Q26574281
Clock House	II	High Street			31 December 1982	TQ6394831886; 51°03′46″N 0°20′18″E		1353638	Clock House More images	Q26636549
Hill House	II	High Street			31 December 1982	TQ6381131985; 51°03′50″N 0°20′11″E		1353639	Upload Photo	Q26636550
The Stables of Hill House to the North West of the House	II	High Street			31 December 1982	TQ6379631991; 51°03′50″N 0°20′10″E		1353657	Upload Photo	Q26636566
Magpie, Delicatus Fine Foods And The Institute	II	High Street, TN5 6AP			31 December 1982	TQ6405731774; 51°03′43″N 0°20′23″E		1353659	Magpie, Delicatus Fine Foods And The Institute More images	Q26636568
Hillside Cottages	II	1 and 2, High Street			31 December 1982	TQ6385831912; 51°03′47″N 0°20′13″E		1353658	Upload Photo	Q26636567
Wadhurst War Memorial	II	Memorial Gardens, High Street			12 February 2015	TQ6363532082; 51°03′53″N 0°20′02″E		1424131	Wadhurst War Memorial More images	Q26677084
Ladymeads	II	Lower Cousley Wood			26 July 1973	TQ6651033859; 51°04′48″N 0°22′33″E		1028071	Upload Photo	Q26279071
Cousleywood Farmhouse	II	Lower Cousley Wood			31 December 1982	TQ6606533810; 51°04′46″N 0°22′10″E		1353660	Upload Photo	Q26636570
Sunnyside	II	Lower High Street			31 December 1982	TQ6419031710; 51°03′41″N 0°20′30″E		1028073	Sunnyside More images	Q26279073
Wadhurst Youth Centre (the South East Portion)	II	Lower High Street			31 December 1982	TQ6425731627; 51°03′38″N 0°20′33″E		1028074	Upload Photo	Q26279074
Kemps	II	Lower High Street			31 December 1982	TQ6427231609; 51°03′37″N 0°20′34″E		1194696	Upload Photo	Q26489309
April Cottage	II	Lower High Street			31 December 1982	TQ6423831648; 51°03′38″N 0°20′32″E		1285590	Upload Photo	Q26574272
Mount Pleasant	II	1-4, Lower High Street			31 December 1982	TQ6428531586; 51°03′36″N 0°20′35″E		1028075	Upload Photo	Q26279075
Laurel Bank Terrace	II	2-5, Lower High Street			7 December 1992	TQ6426431559; 51°03′36″N 0°20′34″E		1353746	Upload Photo	Q26636650
Earl's Farmhouse	II	Mark Cross			26 November 1953	TQ5969530814; 51°03′16″N 0°16′38″E		1028076	Upload Photo	Q26279076
Oasthouses and Granary at Earl's Farm to the North East of the Farmhouse	II	Mark Cross			31 December 1982	TQ5968230886; 51°03′18″N 0°16′37″E		1028077	Upload Photo	Q26279077
Corner Cottage	II	Mark Cross			31 December 1982	TQ5894431373; 51°03′35″N 0°16′00″E		1194701	Upload Photo	Q26489315
Earl's Farm Barn	II	Mark Cross			10 January 1984	TQ5956230743; 51°03′14″N 0°16′31″E		1353707	Upload Photo	Q26636616
Horsegrove	II	Osmers Hill, Woods Green			31 December 1982	TQ6395733128; 51°04′27″N 0°20′20″E		1285558	Upload Photo	Q26574243
Partridges	II	Partridges Lane			31 December 1982	TQ6024832184; 51°04′00″N 0°17′08″E		1028078	Upload Photo	Q26279078
Copstone Cottage	II	Pell Green			31 December 1982	TQ6465633179; 51°04′28″N 0°20′56″E		1028082	Upload Photo	Q26279085
Barcaldine	II	Pell Green			31 December 1982	TQ6449433082; 51°04′25″N 0°20′48″E		1194724	Upload Photo	Q26489338
Chapel Cottage	II	Pell Green			12 April 1978	TQ6454433125; 51°04′26″N 0°20′51″E		1194725	Upload Photo	Q26489339
Days Cottage	II	Pell Green			31 December 1982	TQ6441232975; 51°04′21″N 0°20′44″E		1285565	Upload Photo	Q26574248
Pell House	II	Pell Green			26 November 1953	TQ6442233029; 51°04′23″N 0°20′44″E		1353662	Upload Photo	Q26636572
Rehoboth Chapel	II	Pell Green			12 April 1978	TQ6453133120; 51°04′26″N 0°20′50″E		1353663	Upload Photo	Q2167440
Pell Bridge	II	Pell Lane			31 December 1982	TQ6409632354; 51°04′01″N 0°20′26″E		1028079	Upload Photo	Q26279079
Oasthouses and Granary to the North East of Great Pell Farmhouse	II	Pell Lane			31 December 1982	TQ6437932832; 51°04′17″N 0°20′42″E		1028080	Upload Photo	Q26279082
Little Pell Farmhouse	II	Pell Lane			31 December 1982	TQ6450332070; 51°03′52″N 0°20′47″E		1194709	Upload Photo	Q26489323
Kelly Cottage	II	Pell Lane			31 December 1982	TQ6426032039; 51°03′51″N 0°20′34″E		1194711	Upload Photo	Q26489325
Great Pell Farmhouse	II	Pell Lane			31 December 1982	TQ6434832818; 51°04′16″N 0°20′40″E		1194718	Upload Photo	Q26489332
Barn to the North East of Little Pell Farmhouse	II	Pell Lane			9 June 1982	TQ6453832100; 51°03′53″N 0°20′49″E		1353661	Upload Photo	Q26636571
Little Primmers	II	Primmers Green, TN5 6DU			31 May 2023	TQ6389832619; 51°04′10″N 0°20′17″E		1485748	Upload Photo	Q126191264
Barn at the Mill House Riverhall, to the South East of the House	II	Riverhall			31 December 1982	TQ6065733564; 51°04′44″N 0°17′32″E		1285572	Upload Photo	Q26574254
The Mill House	II	Riverhall			26 November 1953	TQ6070033591; 51°04′45″N 0°17′34″E		1353632	Upload Photo	Q26636543
Springdale Cottages	II	1 and 2, Riverhall			31 December 1982	TQ6048433419; 51°04′40″N 0°17′23″E		1353664	Upload Photo	Q26636573
Stream Farmhouse	II	Scrag Oak			31 December 1982	TQ6349029978; 51°02′45″N 0°19′51″E		1028085	Upload Photo	Q26279088
Boundary Wall to the South East of Scrag Oak	II	Scrag Oak			31 December 1982	TQ6378029766; 51°02′38″N 0°20′06″E		1028086	Upload Photo	Q26279089
Weir Cottage	II	Scrag Oak			31 December 1982	TQ6399828656; 51°02′02″N 0°20′15″E		1028087	Upload Photo	Q26279091
Scrag Oak	II	Scrag Oak			26 November 1953	TQ6377629788; 51°02′39″N 0°20′06″E		1194791	Upload Photo	Q26489407
Stables or Barn to the North West of Scrag Oak	II	Scrag Oak			31 December 1982	TQ6375329805; 51°02′39″N 0°20′05″E		1194793	Upload Photo	Q26489409
Combe Manor	II	Scrag Oak			26 November 1953	TQ6224128488; 51°01′58″N 0°18′45″E		1194795	Upload Photo	Q26489412
Stream Cottage	II	Scrag Oak			31 December 1982	TQ6351629989; 51°02′46″N 0°19′53″E		1285552	Upload Photo	Q26574239
Wenbans	II*	Scrag Oak			26 November 1953	TQ6336929780; 51°02′39″N 0°19′45″E		1285557	Upload Photo	Q17556940
Oasthouses and Granary to the South West of Wenbans	II	Scrag Oak			31 December 1982	TQ6336029736; 51°02′38″N 0°19′44″E		1353666	Upload Photo	Q26636575
Lodgehill Farmhouse	II	Scrag Oak			31 December 1982	TQ6225629098; 51°02′18″N 0°18′47″E		1353667	Upload Photo	Q26636576
Oasthouses and Granary Opposite Normanswood	II	Shover's Green			31 December 1982	TQ6534230111; 51°02′48″N 0°21′27″E		1353685	Upload Photo	Q26636593
Snape Barn Garden Walls with Railings	II	Snape Lane			23 May 2001	TQ6262130250; 51°02′55″N 0°19′07″E		1246105	Upload Photo	Q26538545
Snape Barn	II	Snape Lane			14 June 1999	TQ6262730235; 51°02′54″N 0°19′07″E		1387304	Upload Photo	Q26666963
Snape House	II	Snape Lane, TN5 6NS			21 January 2022	TQ6263930262; 51°02′55″N 0°19′08″E		1479467	Upload Photo	Q111853376
Curtain Walls to the North and East of Snape House and to the East of Clock House	II	Snape Lane, TN5 6NS			21 January 2022	TQ6267430182; 51°02′53″N 0°19′10″E		1479486	Upload Photo	Q111853377
Forge House	II	Sparrow's Green			31 December 1982	TQ6358132318; 51°04′01″N 0°20′00″E		1028047	Upload Photo	Q26279037
Robin Cottage	II	Sparrow's Green			31 December 1982	TQ6361432255; 51°03′59″N 0°20′01″E		1028050	Upload Photo	Q26279041
Wadhurst Castle	II	TN5 6DA, Sparrow's Green			31 December 1982	TQ6348631986; 51°03′50″N 0°19′54″E		1028052	Wadhurst Castle More images	Q23305144
Home Cote	II	Sparrow's Green, TN5 6SH			31 December 1982	TQ6356032132; 51°03′55″N 0°19′58″E		1194815	Upload Photo	Q26489432
Manor Cottage	II	Sparrow's Green			31 December 1982	TQ6361332445; 51°04′05″N 0°20′02″E		1353686	Upload Photo	Q26636594
Holmfield	II	Sparrow's Green			31 December 1982	TQ6356132287; 51°04′00″N 0°19′59″E		1353687	Upload Photo	Q26636595
Gloucester Place Cottages	II	1-4, Sparrow's Green			31 December 1982	TQ6364132552; 51°04′08″N 0°20′03″E		1028046	Upload Photo	Q26279036
Halls Cottage	II	1-4, Sparrow's Green			31 December 1982	TQ6359532247; 51°03′58″N 0°20′00″E		1028051	Upload Photo	Q26279043
Tilehurst Cottages	II	1 and 2, Sparrow's Green			31 December 1982	TQ6361432276; 51°03′59″N 0°20′01″E		1353649	Upload Photo	Q26636559
Pembroke Place	II	4, Sparrow's Green			31 December 1982	TQ6362832355; 51°04′02″N 0°20′02″E		1028048	Upload Photo	Q26279038
Hill House Cottage	II	5 and 6, Sparrow's Green			31 December 1982	TQ6360432267; 51°03′59″N 0°20′01″E		1028049	Upload Photo	Q26279039
St James Cottage	II	St James's Square			31 December 1982	TQ6414831758; 51°03′42″N 0°20′28″E		1028083	St James Cottage More images	Q26279086
Forge Cottage	II	St James's Square			31 December 1982	TQ6416231746; 51°03′42″N 0°20′29″E		1028084	Forge Cottage More images	Q26279087
The Greyhound Inn	II	St James's Square			31 December 1982	TQ6412431712; 51°03′41″N 0°20′27″E		1194738	The Greyhound Inn More images	Q26489351
Stables to the North East of the Greyhound	II	St James's Square			31 December 1982	TQ6414031720; 51°03′41″N 0°20′27″E		1353665	Upload Photo	Q26636574
1, St James's Square	II	1, St James's Square			31 December 1982	TQ6413631770; 51°03′43″N 0°20′27″E		1194734	1, St James's Square More images	Q26489347
Wadhurst Station and Footbridge	II	Station Road			6 December 2000	TQ6215432996; 51°04′24″N 0°18′48″E		1246217	Upload Photo	Q26538645
Savage Pit Cottages	II	1-4, Station Road			31 December 1982	TQ6280732624; 51°04′11″N 0°19′21″E		1285536	Upload Photo	Q26574223
Tapsells	II	Tapsells Lane			16 May 1990	TQ6237832245; 51°04′00″N 0°18′58″E		1252627	Upload Photo	Q26544468
Tappington Grange	II	Three Oaks Lane			26 November 1953	TQ6213933274; 51°04′33″N 0°18′47″E		1028053	Upload Photo	Q26279045
Three Oaks House	II	Three Oaks Lane, TN5 6PX			21 October 2015	TQ6263033068; 51°04′26″N 0°19′12″E		1429634	Upload Photo	Q26677543
Baptist Chapel	II	Ticehurst Road, Shover's Green			12 April 1978	TQ6527130495; 51°03′00″N 0°21′24″E		1028045	Upload Photo	Q7502882
Old Darby's	II	Ticehurst Road			31 December 1982	TQ6473730854; 51°03′12″N 0°20′57″E		1028054	Upload Photo	Q26279047
Moseham	II	Ticehurst Road			31 December 1982	TQ6455731170; 51°03′23″N 0°20′48″E		1194822	Upload Photo	Q26489439
Barn about 50 Metres North of Chittinghurst	II*	Tidebrook			12 October 1989	TQ6154229088; 51°02′18″N 0°18′10″E		1027956	Upload Photo	Q17556221
Tidebrook Manor	II	Tidebrook			31 December 1982	TQ6147229475; 51°02′31″N 0°18′07″E		1028055	Upload Photo	Q26279048
Chittinghurst	II	Tidebrook			31 December 1982	TQ6151929035; 51°02′17″N 0°18′09″E		1028056	Upload Photo	Q26279050
Oasthouses and Granary to the East of Tidebrook Manor	II	Tidebrook			31 December 1982	TQ6150329469; 51°02′31″N 0°18′09″E		1285499	Upload Photo	Q26574189
The Cottage	II	Tidebrook			31 December 1982	TQ6154130085; 51°02′51″N 0°18′11″E		1285502	Upload Photo	Q26574192
Oasthouses and Stables to the South East of Newhouse Riseden Farmhouse	II	Tidebrook			31 December 1982	TQ6184730463; 51°03′03″N 0°18′28″E		1285505	Upload Photo	Q26574195
The Parish Church of St John the Baptist	II	Tidebrook			11 November 2002	TQ6141530012; 51°02′48″N 0°18′05″E		1350328	The Parish Church of St John the Baptist More images	Q26633541
Newhouse Farmhouse	II	Tidebrook, Riseden			31 December 1982	TQ6182330485; 51°03′03″N 0°18′27″E		1353650	Upload Photo	Q26636560
Mayhurst	II	Wadhurst Park			31 December 1982	TQ6328428894; 51°02′10″N 0°19′39″E		1028057	Upload Photo	Q26279051
The New House, including orangery, Millennium Pavilion, terraces and all hard landscaping by John Outram Associates	I	Wadhurst Park, TN5 6NT			2 July 2020	TQ6322228813; 51°02′08″N 0°19′36″E		1457638	Upload Photo	Q97399420
Whitegates Farm Cottage	II	Whitegates Lane, TN5 6QG			31 December 1982	TQ6281333748; 51°04′48″N 0°19′23″E		1028058	Upload Photo	Q26279052
Whitegates Farm	II	Whitegates Lane, TN5 6QG			31 December 1982	TQ6284433748; 51°04′48″N 0°19′24″E		1285513	Upload Photo	Q26574201
Moons	II	Whitegates Lane			31 December 1982	TQ6240234112; 51°05′00″N 0°19′02″E		1285514	Upload Photo	Q26574202
Great Shoesmiths Farmhouse	II*	Whitegates Lane			26 November 1953	TQ6280934593; 51°05′15″N 0°19′24″E		1353651	Upload Photo	Q17557017
Main Barn	II	Wickhurst Farm, Cousley Wood			24 June 1987	TQ6382935350; 51°05′39″N 0°20′17″E		1027990	Upload Photo	Q26278964
Cartshed	II	Wickhurst Farm, Cousley Wood			24 June 1987	TQ6384335340; 51°05′38″N 0°20′18″E		1027991	Upload Photo	Q26278965
Dairy and Cattle Byre	II	Wickhurst Farm, Cousley Wood			24 June 1987	TQ6381535373; 51°05′39″N 0°20′17″E		1252501	Upload Photo	Q26544356
Oast House	II	Wickhurst Farm, Cousley Wood			24 June 1987	TQ6387835337; 51°05′38″N 0°20′20″E		1252626	Upload Photo	Q26544467
Gate House	II	Woods Green			26 November 1953	TQ6404933400; 51°04′35″N 0°20′26″E		1028059	Upload Photo	Q26279054
Oasthouses and Cartshed to the North West of Perrins Farmhouse	II	Woods Green			31 December 1982	TQ6384733745; 51°04′47″N 0°20′16″E		1028060	Upload Photo	Q26279055
Wyck Cottage	II	Woods Green			31 December 1982	TQ6393833637; 51°04′43″N 0°20′20″E		1180365	Upload Photo	Q26475583
Barn to the South East of Perrins Farmhouse	II	Woods Green			31 December 1982	TQ6389533681; 51°04′45″N 0°20′18″E		1180375	Upload Photo	Q26475595
Perrins Farmhouse	II	Woods Green			31 December 1982	TQ6386433701; 51°04′45″N 0°20′17″E		1353652	Upload Photo	Q26636561
Wyck Cottage	II	Woods Green, TN5 6QS			13 January 2016	TQ6396233618; 51°04′42″N 0°20′21″E		1432295	Upload Photo	Q26677811
Markwicks, The House And Barn Adjoining	II				31 December 1982	TQ6684834232; 51°04′59″N 0°22′51″E		1028072	Upload Photo	Q26279072
Riverhall	II*				26 November 1953	TQ6054333324; 51°04′36″N 0°17′25″E		1028091	Upload Photo	Q17556225
Early Farmhouse	II				31 December 1982	TQ5980532904; 51°04′24″N 0°16′47″E		1028092	Upload Photo	Q26279098
Dens Farmhouse	II				31 December 1982	TQ6469428187; 51°01′46″N 0°20′50″E		1028093	Upload Photo	Q26279099
Wall and Gatepiers and Gates Adjoining Snape Barn to South East	II				23 May 2001	TQ6262930222; 51°02′54″N 0°19′08″E		1271524	Upload Photo	Q26561467
Gates and Gatepiers and Wall with Railings to the West of South Lodge	II				23 May 2001	TQ6221730336; 51°02′58″N 0°18′47″E		1271525	Upload Photo	Q26561468
Greenman Farmhouse	II				31 December 1982	TQ6112133523; 51°04′42″N 0°17′55″E		1353631	Upload Photo	Q26636542

== See also ==
- Grade I listed buildings in East Sussex
- Grade II* listed buildings in East Sussex

== Sources ==
- Antram, Nicholas; Pevsner, Nikolaus (2012) [1965], Sussex: East, The Buildings of England, New Haven and London: Yale University Press, ISBN 978-0-300-18473-0
