= Dane Hills =

Area of Leicester in Leicestershire, England

Coordinates: 52.640°N 1.168°W

Dane Hills is a large area on the western side of the English city of Leicester. It consists of the smaller areas of Western Park, which is bounded by Glenfield to the west. The area is understood to be named because it was the site of a Danelaw encampment around 877AD. A cave in this area was known as Black Annis's Bower; the cave was reputed to be the lair of a witch or hag of that name.
