= Listed buildings in Lewes district, East Sussex =

== Lewes District ==
There are around 1,400 Listed buildings in Lewes District, East Sussex, which are buildings of architectural or historic interest.

- Grade I buildings are of exceptional interest.
- Grade II* buildings are particularly important buildings of more than special interest.
- Grade II buildings are of special interest.

The lists follow Historic England’s geographical organisation, with entries grouped by county, local authority, and parish (civil and non-civil). The following lists are arranged by parish.

Parish	Listed buildings list	Grade I	Grade II*	Grade II	Total
Alfriston	no listed buildings				
Barcombe	Listed buildings in Barcombe				
Beddingham	Listed buildings in Beddingham				
Bishopstone	no listed buildings				
Chailey	Listed buildings in Chailey				
Chalvington with Ripe	no listed buildings				
Ditchling	Listed buildings in Ditchling				
East Chiltington	Listed buildings in East Chiltington				
Exceat	no listed buildings				
Falmer	Listed buildings in Falmer				
Firle	Listed buildings in Firle				
Glynde and Beddingham	Listed buildings in Glynde and Beddingham				
Hamsey	Listed buildings in Hamsey				
Iford	Listed buildings in Iford				
Kingston near Lewes	Listed buildings in Kingston near Lewes				
Lewes	Listed buildings in Lewes (town centre); Listed buildings in Lewes (suburbs)	9	22	499	530
Newhaven	Listed buildings in Newhaven				
Newick	Listed buildings in Newick				
Peacehaven	Listed buildings in Peacehaven				
Piddinghoe	Listed buildings in Piddinghoe				
Plumpton	Listed buildings in Plumpton				
Ringmer	Listed buildings in Ringmer				
Rodmell	Listed buildings in Rodmell				
Seaford	Listed buildings in Seaford, East Sussex	2	1	60	63
South Heighton	Listed buildings in South Heighton				
Southease	Listed buildings in Southease				
St Ann Without	Listed buildings in St Ann Without				
St John Without	Listed buildings in St John Without				
Streat	Listed buildings in Streat				
Tarring Neville	Listed buildings in Tarring Neville				
Telscombe	Listed buildings in Telscombe				
Westmeston	Listed buildings in Westmeston				
West Firle	no listed buildings				
Total (Lewes district)	—	29	61	1,186	1,271
