= Seaford Head =

Nature reserve in Seaford, East Sussex, England

Coordinates: 50.763°N 0.138°E

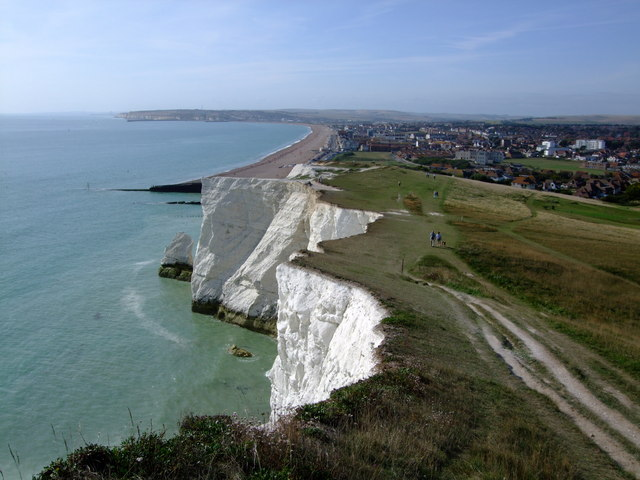
- Interactive map of Seaford Head
- Type: Local Nature Reserve
- Location: Seaford, East Sussex
- OS grid: TV 509 981
- Area: 150.2 hectares (371 acres)
- Manager: Sussex Wildlife Trust, East Sussex County Council, National Trust

Seaford Head is a 150.2-hectare (371-acre) Local Nature Reserve east of Seaford in East Sussex. It is part of Seaford to Beachy Head Site of Special Scientific Interest. An area of 83 hectares (210 acres) is owned by Seaford Town Council and managed by the Sussex Wildlife Trust. The rest is divided between Seven Sisters Country Park, which is owned and managed by East Sussex County Council, and an area owned by the National Trust.

The site has diverse habitats with chalk grassland, chalk cliffs, scrub, vegetated shingle, wet grassland, saltmarsh and rockpools. Grassland flora include kidney vetch, squinancywort, moon carrot and clustered bellflower. There are butterflies such as silver-spotted skipper, chalkhill blue and adonis blue.
