= Old Town Hall, Seaford =

Municipal building in Seaford, East Sussex, England

Old Town Hall
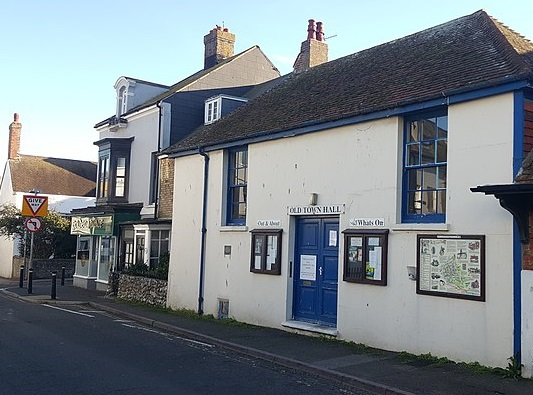
- Old Town Hall

- Shown in East Sussex
- 50.7708°N 0.1013°E
- Location: South Street, Seaford

History
- Built: c.1562

Site notes
- Architectural style: Vernacular style

Listed Building – Grade II
- Official name: The Old Town Hall
- Designated: 15 November 1976
- Reference no.: 1252581

The Old Town Hall is a municipal building in South Street in Seaford, East Sussex, England. The structure, which is now in commercial use, is a Grade II listed building.

== History ==
The first municipal building in Seaford was an ancient town hall in Church Street with a vaulted crypt dating back to the 13th century; it was later demolished but the crypt survived, and the site was subsequently occupied by a building known as "The Folly".

The current building in South Street was designed in the vernacular style, built in brick with a rendered finish and, in its original form, dated back to around 1562. The design involved an asymmetrical main frontage of three bays facing onto South Street. The central bay was fenestrated with windows for prison cells on the ground floor. There was also an external staircase leading up to a doorway on the first floor in the right-hand bay. Internally, the principal rooms included a lock-up for the incarceration of petty criminals on the ground floor, and a council chamber, which was also the meeting place of the local masonic lodge, on the first floor.

The town hall, which was remodelled in the 18th century, was the venue a riot when the reformer, Thomas Oldfield, arrived to give a lecture there in 1789. Seaford had a very small electorate and a dominant patron, Charles Ellis, 1st Baron Seaford of Claremont, which meant it was recognised by the UK Parliament as a rotten borough. Its right to elect members of parliament was removed by the Reform Act 1832, and its borough council, which had met in the council chamber, was abolished under the Municipal Corporations Act 1883. Although the town became an urban district in 1894, the new civic leaders decided that the town hall was too small and chose to base themselves in new council offices in Clinton Place.

The building subsequently served as a fire station until a new fire station could be completed on the corner of West Street and Green Lane. After serving as a base for the Home Guard during the Second World War, the building became a community tea room in the 1990s.
