= Listed buildings in Seaford, East Sussex =

Civil Parish in East Sussex, England

Seaford is a town and civil parish in East Sussex, England. It contains two grade I, one grade II* and 60 grade II listed buildings that are recorded in the National Heritage List for England.

This list is based on the information retrieved online from Historic England.

== Key ==
Grade	Criteria
I	Buildings that are of exceptional interest
II*	Particularly important buildings of more than special interest
II	Buildings that are of special interest

== Listing ==
Name	Grade	Location	Type	Completed (Note: The date given is the date used by Historic England as significant for the initial building or that of an important part in the structure's description.)	Date designated	Grid ref. (Note: The grid reference is based on the British national grid reference system, sometimes known as OSGB36, used by the Ordnance Survey.) Geo-coordinates	Notes	Entry number (Note: The "List Entry Number" is a unique number assigned to each listed building and scheduled monument by Historic England.)	Image	
Garden Wall at Field Cottage	II	Belgrave Road, East Blatchington			26 October 1971	TV4831999825; 50°46′45″N 0°06′09″E		1352932	Upload Photo	Q26635900
Field Cottage	II	Belgrave Road, East Blatchington			26 October 1971	TV4832399849; 50°46′45″N 0°06′09″E		1044058	Upload Photo	Q26296091
New Barn	II	Bishopstone			8 January 1991	TQ4802901273; 50°47′32″N 0°05′56″E		1372060	Upload Photo	Q26653185
Church of St Andrew	I	Bishopstone			2 March 1950	TQ4724500979; 50°47′23″N 0°05′16″E		1044059	Upload Photo	Q17534728
Wall of Churchyard and Enclosure to the East	II	Bishopstone			26 October 1971	TQ4728300976; 50°47′23″N 0°05′17″E		1044060	Upload Photo	Q26296092
Almshouses (now 2 Dwellings)	II	Bishopstone			26 October 1971	TQ4726701004; 50°47′24″N 0°05′17″E		1352933	Upload Photo	Q26635901
The Manor House	II	Bishopstone			26 October 1971	TQ4732800907; 50°47′20″N 0°05′20″E		1352951	Upload Photo	Q26635916
The Parish Church of St Peter	II*	Blatchington Hill			2 March 1950	TV4839999819; 50°46′44″N 0°06′13″E		1044020	Upload Photo	Q17555643
The Gables	II	Blatchington Hill			26 October 1971	TV4843999813; 50°46′44″N 0°06′15″E		1044021	Upload Photo	Q26296049
Monks Orchard	II	Blatchington Hill			26 October 1971	TV4842699793; 50°46′43″N 0°06′14″E		1044023	Upload Photo	Q26296051
The Stables (belonging to 'The Gables')	II	Blatchington Hill			26 October 1971	TV4845399809; 50°46′44″N 0°06′15″E		1044022	Upload Photo	Q26296050
Churchyard Wall	II	Blatchington Hill			26 October 1971	TV4838699834; 50°46′45″N 0°06′12″E		1352953	Upload Photo	Q26685476
Drew Cottage	II	28, Blatchington Hill			26 October 1971	TV4846199770; 50°46′43″N 0°06′16″E		1352954	Upload Photo	Q26635919
Twyn Cottage	II	3, Blatchington Road			12 March 1990	TV4820699243; 50°46′26″N 0°06′02″E		1252612	Upload Photo	Q26544454
The Parish Church of St Leonard	I	Church Street			2 March 1950	TV4826299028; 50°46′19″N 0°06′05″E		1352955	Upload Photo	Q17534894
Churchyard Wall	II	Church Street			26 October 1971	TV4825299058; 50°46′20″N 0°06′04″E		1044024	Upload Photo	Q26296052
Alma House	II	4, Church Street			26 October 1971	TV4826298903; 50°46′15″N 0°06′04″E		1044025	Upload Photo	Q26296053
Barn North East of Chyngton House	II	Chyngton Lane			14 July 1975	TV5037898825; 50°46′10″N 0°07′52″E		1352961	Upload Photo	Q26635925
Outbuilding Immediately West to Dovecote at Chyngton House	II	Chyngton Lane			14 July 1975	TV5038098761; 50°46′08″N 0°07′52″E		1252541	Upload Photo	Q26544394
Dovecote South East of Chyngton House	II	Chyngton Lane			14 July 1975	TV5039198764; 50°46′08″N 0°07′53″E		1352960	Upload Photo	Q26635924
Outbuilding Immediately East of Dovecote at Chyngton House	II	Chyngton Lane			14 July 1975	TV5039898769; 50°46′08″N 0°07′53″E		1044037	Upload Photo	Q26296067
Outbuilding South of Chyngton House	II	Chyngton Lane			14 July 1975	TV5034898721; 50°46′07″N 0°07′51″E		1044038	Upload Photo	Q26296068
Cowsheds East of Chyngton House	II	Chyngton Lane			14 July 1975	TV5039398794; 50°46′09″N 0°07′53″E		1262217	Upload Photo	Q26553106
Chyngton House	II	Chyngton Lane			14 July 1975	TV5035498795; 50°46′09″N 0°07′51″E		1252539	Upload Photo	Q26544392
151 and 152, Chyngton Lane	II	151 and 152, Chyngton Lane			16 September 1975	TV5040999393; 50°46′29″N 0°07′55″E		1044036	Upload Photo	Q26296066
Chyngton Cottages	II	155 and 156, Chyngton Lane			14 July 1975	TV5040198699; 50°46′06″N 0°07′53″E		1044039	Upload Photo	Q26296069
Corsica Hall	II	College Road, BN25 1JX			2 March 1950	TV4869198559; 50°46′03″N 0°06′26″E		1044026	Upload Photo	Q26296054
Numbers 1-14 Fizgerald House	II	Croft Lane			23 March 1989	TV4842299049; 50°46′19″N 0°06′13″E		1039983	Upload Photo	Q26291787
Stone House (immediately Behind Seaford House)	II	Crouch Lane			26 October 1971	TV4847598905; 50°46′15″N 0°06′15″E		1044027	Upload Photo	Q26296056
2, 3 and 4, Crouch Lane	II	2, 3 and 4, Crouch Lane			23 March 1989	TV4846098970; 50°46′17″N 0°06′15″E		1039982	Upload Photo	Q26291786
World War II Anti-tank Obstacles	II	Cuckmere Haven			23 July 2009	TV5151597766; 50°45′35″N 0°08′49″E		1393398	Upload Photo	Q26672563
Archway Leading into Crouch Garden	II	East Street			26 October 1971	TV4852698957; 50°46′16″N 0°06′18″E		1192331	Upload Photo	Q26487004
Sutton Place	II	Eastbourne Road			26 October 1971	TV4946999597; 50°46′36″N 0°07′07″E		1044028	Upload Photo	Q26296057
Garden Wall at No 2	II	High Street			26 October 1971	TV4829298888; 50°46′14″N 0°06′06″E		1192356	Upload Photo	Q26487027
Albion House	II	2, High Street			26 October 1971	TV4829898882; 50°46′14″N 0°06′06″E		1044030	Upload Photo	Q26296059
5-9, High Street	II	5-9, High Street			26 October 1971	TV4830298920; 50°46′15″N 0°06′07″E		1044031	Upload Photo	Q26296060
12-16, High Street	II	12-16, High Street			26 October 1971	TV4832498921; 50°46′15″N 0°06′08″E		1352956	Upload Photo	Q26635920
The Old House	II	15 and 17, High Street			26 October 1971	TV4832298940; 50°46′16″N 0°06′08″E		1044032	Upload Photo	Q26296061
The Regency Lounge	II	20, High Street			26 October 1971	TV4834498934; 50°46′16″N 0°06′09″E		1286632	Upload Photo	Q26575213
44 46 48 and 50, High Street	II	44 46 48 and 50, High Street			23 March 1989	TV4844798979; 50°46′17″N 0°06′14″E		1252604	Upload Photo	Q26544448
The Star House	II	Homefield Road, East Blatchington			26 October 1971	TV4848499735; 50°46′41″N 0°06′17″E		1044029	Upload Photo	Q26296058
1-4, Marine Terrace	II	1-4, Marine Terrace			26 October 1971	TV4826798873; 50°46′14″N 0°06′05″E		1044035	Upload Photo	Q26296065
1 and 2, Monksdown Barn	II	1 and 2, Monksdown Barn, Silver Lane, Bishopstone Village, BN25 2UD, Bishopstone			26 October 1971	TQ4734700969; 50°47′22″N 0°05′21″E		1352952	Upload Photo	Q26635917
15, Pelham Road	II	15, Pelham Road, BN25 1ES			26 October 1971	TV4817298896; 50°46′15″N 0°06′00″E		1286639	Upload Photo	Q26575219
Saxon Lodge	II	Saxon Lane			26 October 1971	TV4841198863; 50°46′13″N 0°06′12″E		1352958	Upload Photo	Q26635922
Pear Tree Cottage	II	Saxon Lane			2 March 1950	TV4842898859; 50°46′13″N 0°06′13″E		1352957	Upload Photo	Q26635921
Garden Wall to the North and South of Pear Tree Cottage	II	Saxon Lane			26 October 1971	TV4842398846; 50°46′13″N 0°06′13″E		1192389	Upload Photo	Q26487059
Garden Wall at Saxon Lodge	II	Saxon Lane			26 October 1971	TV4841898847; 50°46′13″N 0°06′12″E		1192395	Upload Photo	Q26487065
Barn Opposite Dorcas Cottage	II	Saxon Lane			26 October 1971	TV4841798941; 50°46′16″N 0°06′12″E		1044033	Upload Photo	Q26296062
The Old Town Hall	II	South Street			15 November 1976	TV4827498903; 50°46′15″N 0°06′05″E		1252581	Upload Photo	Q26544431
Honeysuckle Cottage	II	1, South Street			23 March 1989	TV4833598878; 50°46′14″N 0°06′08″E		1372082	Upload Photo	Q26653209
18, South Street	II	18, South Street			2 April 1990	TV4827698922; 50°46′15″N 0°06′05″E		1039981	Upload Photo	Q26291785
1, St Martins	II	1, St Martins			26 October 1971	TV4838098848; 50°46′13″N 0°06′10″E		1352959	Upload Photo	Q26635923
Bishopstone Railway Station	II	Station Road, Bishopstone			25 August 1987	TV4692899911; 50°46′49″N 0°04′58″E		1252605	Upload Photo	Q2330749
5 and 5a, Steyne Road	II	5 and 5a, Steyne Road			26 October 1971	TV4820898880; 50°46′14″N 0°06′02″E		1044034	Upload Photo	Q26296064
Steyne House	II	35, Steyne Road			23 March 1989	TV4830798863; 50°46′13″N 0°06′07″E		1372061	Upload Photo	Q26653186
Causeway House	II	37, Steyne Road			23 March 1989	TV4831498860; 50°46′13″N 0°06′07″E		1039984	Upload Photo	Q26291789
Aberdeen House	II	41, Steyne Road			23 March 1989	TV4835098878; 50°46′14″N 0°06′09″E		1372062	Upload Photo	Q26653187
43 and 45, Steyne Road	II	43 and 45, Steyne Road			26 October 1971	TV4835398863; 50°46′13″N 0°06′09″E		1192403	Upload Photo	Q26487073
Garden Wall in Front of Nos 1 to 4 (consecutive)	II	Steyne Road Marine Terrace			26 October 1971	TV4826598862; 50°46′13″N 0°06′05″E		1286618	Upload Photo	Q26575199
Martello Tower	II	The Esplanade			26 October 1971	TV4846598492; 50°46′01″N 0°06′14″E		1192342	Upload Photo	Q17664683
Seaford Railway Station	II				14 November 1986	TV4817099136; 50°46′22″N 0°06′00″E		1044019	Upload Photo	Q1877282
Sutton Park Road	II	BN25 1RR			30 January 2018	TV4848499259; 50°46′26″N 0°06′16″E		1451508	Upload Photo	Q66479158

== See also ==
- Grade I listed buildings in East Sussex
- Grade II* listed buildings in East Sussex

== Sources ==
- Antram, Nicholas; Pevsner, Nikolaus (2012) [1965], Sussex: East, The Buildings of England, New Haven and London: Yale University Press, ISBN 978-0-300-18473-0
