= Listed buildings in Lewes (suburbs) =

Historic structures in East Sussex, England

Lewes is a town and civil parish in East Sussex, England. It contains nine grade I, 22 grade II* and 499 grade II listed buildings that are recorded in the National Heritage List for England.

This list is based on the information retrieved online from Historic England.

The number of listed buildings in Lewes requires subdivision into geographically defined lists. This list includes all listed buildings outside the town centre, defined as the area around the High Street.

== Key ==
Grade	Criteria
I	Buildings that are of exceptional interest
II*	Particularly important buildings of more than special interest
II	Buildings that are of special interest

== Listing ==
Name	Grade	Location	Type	Completed (Note: The date given is the date used by Historic England as significant for the initial building or that of an important part in the structure's description.)	Date designated	Grid ref. (Note: The grid reference is based on the British national grid reference system, sometimes known as OSGB36, used by the Ordnance Survey.) Geo-coordinates	Notes	Entry number (Note: The "List Entry Number" is a unique number assigned to each listed building and scheduled monument by Historic England.)	Image	
Store to North of the Swan Public House	II	Bell Lane			29 October 1985	TQ4085309591; 50°52′07″N 0°00′01″E		1190129	Upload Photo	Q26485184
Lewes Prison	II	Brighton Road			29 October 1985	TQ4031010108; 50°52′24″N 0°00′26″W		1043892	Upload Photo	Q26295920
2, Chapel Hill	II	2, Chapel Hill, Cliffe			29 October 1985	TQ4219410271; 50°52′28″N 0°01′11″E		1043901	Upload Photo	Q26295927
Lamb House	II*	3, Chapel Hill, Cliffe			25 March 1952	TQ4220510271; 50°52′28″N 0°01′11″E		1190338	Upload Photo	Q17555649
5, Chapel Hill	II	5, Chapel Hill, Cliffe			29 October 1985	TQ4221010262; 50°52′28″N 0°01′12″E		1353011	Upload Photo	Q26635971
7, Chapel Hill	II	7, Chapel Hill			29 October 1985	TQ4221710256; 50°52′28″N 0°01′12″E		1190343	Upload Photo	Q26493951
8 and 9, Chapel Hill	II	8 and 9, Chapel Hill			29 October 1985	TQ4222210260; 50°52′28″N 0°01′12″E		1043902	Upload Photo	Q26295928
Church Lane Bridge	II	Church Lane, Malling			29 October 1985	TQ4141511002; 50°52′52″N 0°00′32″E		1190353	Upload Photo	Q26493961
Church of St Michael	II	Church Lane			29 October 1985	TQ4127310994; 50°52′52″N 0°00′25″E		1043903	Upload Photo	Q26295930
Former Stables to Malling House	II	Church Lane, Malling			25 February 1952	TQ4166411168; 50°52′58″N 0°00′45″E		1043905	Upload Photo	Q26295931
Garden Wall to West of Malling House	II	Church Lane, Malling			29 October 1985	TQ4161011074; 50°52′55″N 0°00′42″E		1353013	Upload Photo	Q26635972
Gateway to Malling Deanery	II	Church Lane, Malling			29 October 1985	TQ4132210981; 50°52′52″N 0°00′27″E		1190352	Upload Photo	Q26493960
Malling Deanery	II*	Church Lane, Malling			25 February 1952	TQ4130710938; 50°52′50″N 0°00′26″E		1353012	Upload Photo	Q17555853
Malling House	I	Church Lane, Malling			25 February 1952	TQ4164611125; 50°52′56″N 0°00′44″E		1043904	Upload Photo	Q17534688
Wall Surrounding Malling House East; South, West And Part Of North Sides, Including Gazebo Attached At South West Corner And Gateways To East And West	II	Church Lane, Malling			25 February 1952	TQ4162411053; 50°52′54″N 0°00′43″E		1190364	Upload Photo	Q26493969
The Old Vicarage	II	Church Lane, South Malling, BN7 2JA, Malling			25 February 1952	TQ4148111000; 50°52′52″N 0°00′35″E		1293844	Upload Photo	Q26581745
Bridge House	II	Cliffe High Street, Cliffe			25 February 1952	TQ4196810258; 50°52′28″N 0°00′59″E		1043863	Upload Photo	Q26295890
Bridge over the River Ouse	II	Cliffe High Street, Cliffe			29 October 1985	TQ4194010228; 50°52′27″N 0°00′58″E		1353014	Upload Photo	Q26635973
Church of St Thomas at Cliffe	II*	Cliffe High Street, Cliffe			25 February 1952	TQ4213210272; 50°52′28″N 0°01′08″E		1043870	Upload Photo	Q17555608
Harvey's Brewery	II*	Cliffe High Street, Cliffe			29 October 1985	TQ4197810289; 50°52′29″N 0°01′00″E		1043864	Upload Photo	Q5677759
Medieval Hall	II	Cliffe High Street			16 January 1989	TQ4201610256; 50°52′28″N 0°01′02″E		1252737	Upload Photo	Q26544571
Pump to South-east of Church of St Thomas at Cliffe	II	Cliffe High Street, Cliffe			29 October 1985	TQ4214410268; 50°52′28″N 0°01′08″E		1190634	Upload Photo	Q26485383
1, Cliffe High Street	II	1, Cliffe High Street, Cliffe			16 March 1970	TQ4195010247; 50°52′27″N 0°00′58″E		1190522	Upload Photo	Q26494112
2, Cliffe High Street	II	2, Cliffe High Street, Cliffe			29 October 1985	TQ4195610254; 50°52′28″N 0°00′59″E		1353034	Upload Photo	Q26635993
4, 5, 6, Cliffe High Street	II	4, 5, 6, Cliffe High Street, Cliffe			29 October 1985	TQ4196910242; 50°52′27″N 0°00′59″E		1353035	Upload Photo	Q26635994
9 and 10, Cliffe High Street	II	9 and 10, Cliffe High Street, Cliffe			9 July 1985	TQ4200710250; 50°52′28″N 0°01′01″E		1043865	Upload Photo	Q26295891
11, Cliffe High Street	II	11, Cliffe High Street, Cliffe			29 October 1985	TQ4201410249; 50°52′27″N 0°01′01″E		1353036	Upload Photo	Q26635995
12 and 13, Cliffe High Street	II	12 and 13, Cliffe High Street, Cliffe			29 October 1985	TQ4202310251; 50°52′28″N 0°01′02″E		1043866	Upload Photo	Q26295892
14 and 15, Cliffe High Street	II	14 and 15, Cliffe High Street, Cliffe			29 October 1985	TQ4203410254; 50°52′28″N 0°01′02″E		1043867	Upload Photo	Q26295894
16 and 17, Cliffe High Street	II	16 and 17, Cliffe High Street, Cliffe			29 October 1985	TQ4203610284; 50°52′29″N 0°01′03″E		1353037	Upload Photo	Q26635996
18, Cliffe High Street	II	18, Cliffe High Street, Cliffe			25 February 1952	TQ4205110266; 50°52′28″N 0°01′03″E		1043868	Upload Photo	Q26295895
19 and 20, Cliffe High Street	II	19 and 20, Cliffe High Street, Cliffe			29 October 1985	TQ4206310261; 50°52′28″N 0°01′04″E		1353038	Upload Photo	Q26635997
22, Cliffe High Street	II	22, Cliffe High Street, Cliffe			29 October 1985	TQ4208010265; 50°52′28″N 0°01′05″E		1293751	Upload Photo	Q26581658
23, Cliffe High Street	II	23, Cliffe High Street, Cliffe			29 October 1985	TQ4208710274; 50°52′28″N 0°01′05″E		1043869	Upload Photo	Q26295896
24 and 25, Cliffe High Street	II	24 and 25, Cliffe High Street, Cliffe			13 March 1985	TQ4209610261; 50°52′28″N 0°01′06″E		1190623	Upload Photo	Q26485372
26 and 27, Cliffe High Street	II	26 and 27, Cliffe High Street, Cliffe			13 March 1985	TQ4210610266; 50°52′28″N 0°01′06″E		1353039	Upload Photo	Q26635998
31 and 32, Cliffe High Street	II	31 and 32, Cliffe High Street, Cliffe			29 October 1985	TQ4215610248; 50°52′27″N 0°01′09″E		1043871	Upload Photo	Q26295897
The Old School House	II	33a, 33b, 34, Cliffe High Street, Cliffe			29 October 1985	TQ4214910244; 50°52′27″N 0°01′08″E		1190668	Upload Photo	Q26485420
37 and 38, Cliffe High Street	II	37 and 38, Cliffe High Street, Cliffe			29 October 1985	TQ4210810235; 50°52′27″N 0°01′06″E		1043872	Upload Photo	Q26295898
39, Cliffe High Street	II	39, Cliffe High Street, Cliffe			29 October 1985	TQ4210110240; 50°52′27″N 0°01′06″E		1190675	Upload Photo	Q26485425
40, Cliffe High Street	II	40, Cliffe High Street, Cliffe			29 October 1985	TQ4209710238; 50°52′27″N 0°01′06″E		1043873	Upload Photo	Q26295900
41, 41a, 42, Cliffe High Street	II	41, 41a, 42, Cliffe High Street, Cliffe			29 October 1985	TQ4208510225; 50°52′27″N 0°01′05″E		1190681	Upload Photo	Q26485431
43, Cliffe High Street	II	43, Cliffe High Street, Cliffe			29 October 1985	TQ4207010229; 50°52′27″N 0°01′04″E		1043874	Upload Photo	Q26295901
44, Cliffe High Street	II	44, Cliffe High Street, Cliffe			29 October 1985	TQ4206110234; 50°52′27″N 0°01′04″E		1043875	Upload Photo	Q26295902
45, Cliffe High Street	II	45, Cliffe High Street, Cliffe			29 October 1985	TQ4205510229; 50°52′27″N 0°01′04″E		1293691	Upload Photo	Q26581605
Gardeners Arms	II	46, Cliffe High Street, Cliffe			29 October 1985	TQ4205010229; 50°52′27″N 0°01′03″E		1043876	Upload Photo	Q26295903
47, Cliffe High Street	II	47, Cliffe High Street, Cliffe			29 October 1985	TQ4204310223; 50°52′27″N 0°01′03″E		1190699	Upload Photo	Q26485449
48, Cliffe High Street	II	48, Cliffe High Street, Cliffe			21 February 1979	TQ4203710223; 50°52′27″N 0°01′03″E		1043877	Upload Photo	Q26295904
49, Cliffe High Street	II	49, Cliffe High Street, Cliffe			29 October 1985	TQ4203110220; 50°52′27″N 0°01′02″E		1293663	Upload Photo	Q26581579
53 and 54, Cliffe High Street	II	53 and 54, Cliffe High Street, Cliffe			29 October 1985	TQ4200510218; 50°52′26″N 0°01′01″E		1353040	Upload Photo	Q26635999
Round Tower in Priory Grounds	II	Cockshut Road, Southover			29 October 1985	TQ4130409526; 50°52′05″N 0°00′24″E		1043878	Upload Photo	Q26295905
Ruins of Lewes Priory	I	Cockshut Road			25 February 1952	TQ4147109604; 50°52′07″N 0°00′33″E		1190737	Upload Photo	Q6536133
Upper Lord's Place	II	2, Cockshut Road, Southover			29 October 1985	TQ4128909605; 50°52′07″N 0°00′24″E		1190731	Upload Photo	Q26485483
Martyrs' Memorial	II	Cuilfail			29 October 1985	TQ4242710364; 50°52′31″N 0°01′23″E		1043879	Upload Photo	Q26295906
Walls to South of Southover Grange	II	Eastport Lane, Southover			29 October 1985	TQ4131709794; 50°52′13″N 0°00′25″E		1192359	Upload Photo	Q26487030
The Old Meeting	II	19, Eastport Lane, Southover			29 October 1985	TQ4140609754; 50°52′12″N 0°00′30″E		1293625	Upload Photo	Q7570925
24 and 25, Eastport Lane	II	24 and 25, Eastport Lane, Southover			25 February 1952	TQ4136309747; 50°52′12″N 0°00′27″E		1353004	Upload Photo	Q26635965
28, Eastport Lane	II	28, Eastport Lane, Southover			29 October 1985	TQ4134509741; 50°52′12″N 0°00′27″E		1353062	Upload Photo	Q26636019
The Maltings Barn	II	Foundry Lane, BN7 2AS, Cliffe			29 October 1985	TQ4204910175; 50°52′25″N 0°01′03″E		1043845	Upload Photo	Q26295869
Offham tramway tunnels, portals, parapets and retaining walls	II	Hamsey			22 November 2013	TQ4011811603; 50°53′13″N 0°00′34″W		1413082	Upload Photo	Q26676313
Huntington Tomb 7 Yards West of the Jireh Chapel	II	Malling Street, Cliffe			29 October 1985	TQ4210410384; 50°52′32″N 0°01′06″E		1043770	Upload Photo	Q26295794
Jireh Chapel and Sunday School to North	I	Malling Street, Cliffe			25 February 1952	TQ4211910381; 50°52′32″N 0°01′07″E		1192055	Upload Photo	Q6536126
Old Tanyard Cottage	II	Malling Street, Cliffe			29 October 1985	TQ4229010754; 50°52′44″N 0°01′16″E		1192099	Upload Photo	Q26486786
Undercliffe House	II	Malling Street, Clifffe			29 October 1985	TQ4236010541; 50°52′37″N 0°01′20″E		1191997	Upload Photo	Q26486693
1 and 3, Malling Street	II	1 and 3, Malling Street, Cliffe			29 October 1985	TQ4218610272; 50°52′28″N 0°01′10″E		1043764	Upload Photo	Q26295787
5, 7, 9, Malling Street	II	5, 7, 9, Malling Street			29 October 1985	TQ4218010281; 50°52′28″N 0°01′10″E		1192003	Upload Photo	Q26486698
8, Malling Street	II	8, Malling Street, Cliffe			25 February 1952	TQ4215310295; 50°52′29″N 0°01′09″E		1043771	Upload Photo	Q26295795
11, Malling Street	II	11, Malling Street			29 October 1985	TQ4218210291; 50°52′29″N 0°01′10″E		1043765	Upload Photo	Q26295788
13, Malling Street	II	13, Malling Street, Cliffe			29 October 1985	TQ4217710295; 50°52′29″N 0°01′10″E		1192047	Upload Photo	Q26486740
15, Malling Street	II	15, Malling Street, Cliffe			29 October 1985	TQ4217510305; 50°52′29″N 0°01′10″E		1043766	Upload Photo	Q26295789
17 and 19, Malling Street	II	17 and 19, Malling Street			29 October 1985	TQ4217510318; 50°52′30″N 0°01′10″E		1043767	Upload Photo	Q26295790
21, Malling Street	II	21, Malling Street, Cliffe			25 February 1952	TQ4218910329; 50°52′30″N 0°01′11″E		1192051	Upload Photo	Q26486744
25, Malling Street	II	25, Malling Street, Cliffe			29 October 1985	TQ4217610356; 50°52′31″N 0°01′10″E		1043768	Upload Photo	Q26295791
27, Malling Street	II	27, Malling Street, Cliffe			29 October 1985	TQ4217610360; 50°52′31″N 0°01′10″E		1286804	Upload Photo	Q26575363
29, Malling Street	II	29, Malling Street, Cliffe			29 October 1985	TQ4217610366; 50°52′31″N 0°01′10″E		1043769	Upload Photo	Q26295792
107, 109 and 111, Malling Street	II	107, 109 and 111, Malling Street			14 February 1980	TQ4229810543; 50°52′37″N 0°01′16″E		1043772	Upload Photo	Q26295796
Coombe House	II	121, Malling Street, Cliffe			16 March 1970	TQ4232410577; 50°52′38″N 0°01′18″E		1192103	Upload Photo	Q26486792
123, Malling Street	II	123, Malling Street, Cliffe			29 October 1985	TQ4231710587; 50°52′38″N 0°01′17″E		1353064	Upload Photo	Q26636021
The Master's Manor	II	149, Malling Street, Cliffe			29 October 1985	TQ4232610688; 50°52′41″N 0°01′18″E		1286748	Upload Photo	Q26575311
Barn 5 Yards North-west of Anne of Cleeves' House	II	Potter's Lane, Southover			29 October 1985	TQ4109109658; 50°52′09″N 0°00′13″E		1043744	Upload Photo	Q26295765
Latchetts	II	Potter's Lane, Southover			29 October 1985	TQ4108409645; 50°52′09″N 0°00′13″E		1353091	Upload Photo	Q26636048
Gateway and Walls to Priory of St Pancras	II	Priory Crescent			25 February 1952	TQ4128809663; 50°52′09″N 0°00′24″E		1043745	Upload Photo	Q26295766
1 and Railings to West, Priory Crescent	II	1 And Railings To West, Priory Crescent, BN7 1HP			25 February 1952	TQ4135409687; 50°52′10″N 0°00′27″E		1192213	Upload Photo	Q26486892
2 and Railings to West, Priory Crescent	II	2 And Railings To West, Priory Crescent, BN7 1HP			25 February 1952	TQ4135509681; 50°52′10″N 0°00′27″E		1353092	Upload Photo	Q26636049
Nos 3-12 and Railings to North	II	3-12, Priory Crescent			25 February 1952	TQ4132609656; 50°52′09″N 0°00′25″E		1192230	Upload Photo	Q26486907
24 and 25, Priory Street	II	24 and 25, Priory Street			29 October 1985	TQ4142409704; 50°52′10″N 0°00′31″E		1192237	Upload Photo	Q26486913
Stricklands Warehouse	II	Railway Lane, BN7 2AQ			8 August 1980	TQ4198510117; 50°52′23″N 0°01′00″E		1043746	Upload Photo	Q26295767
Ruins of a College of Benedictine Canons at Old Malling Farm	II	South Malling			20 August 1965	TQ4097711368; 50°53′05″N 0°00′10″E		1273648	Upload Photo	Q26563368
Wharf House	II	South Street, Cliffe			29 October 1985	TQ4244809966; 50°52′18″N 0°01′23″E		1043702	Upload Photo	Q26295716
1, South Street	II	1, South Street, Cliffe			25 February 1952	TQ4218610252; 50°52′27″N 0°01′10″E		1043696	Upload Photo	Q26295708
7, South Street	II	7, South Street, Cliffe			29 October 1985	TQ4219810238; 50°52′27″N 0°01′11″E		1374932	Upload Photo	Q26655759
10, South Street	II	10, South Street, Cliffe			19 October 1984	TQ4218710217; 50°52′26″N 0°01′10″E		1374934	Upload Photo	Q26655761
11, South Street	II	11, South Street, Cliffe			29 October 1985	TQ4220810224; 50°52′26″N 0°01′11″E		1043697	Upload Photo	Q26295709
12, South Street	II	12, South Street, Cliffe			29 October 1985	TQ4219310216; 50°52′26″N 0°01′11″E		1043700	Upload Photo	Q26295713
13 and 15, South Street	II	13 and 15, South Street, Cliffe			29 October 1985	TQ4221110220; 50°52′26″N 0°01′12″E		1374933	Upload Photo	Q26655760
14, South Street	II	14, South Street, Cliffe			29 October 1985	TQ4219210210; 50°52′26″N 0°01′11″E		1192899	Upload Photo	Q26487568
16, South Street	II	16, South Street, Cliffe			29 October 1985	TQ4219610201; 50°52′26″N 0°01′11″E		1374935	Upload Photo	Q26655762
17, South Street	II	17, South Street, Cliffe			20 August 1985	TQ4221810212; 50°52′26″N 0°01′12″E		1043698	Upload Photo	Q26295710
18, South Street	II	18, South Street, Cliffe			29 October 1985	TQ4219610193; 50°52′26″N 0°01′11″E		1043701	Upload Photo	Q26295715
25, South Street	II	25, South Street, Cliffe			25 February 1952	TQ4224010200; 50°52′26″N 0°01′13″E		1043699	Upload Photo	Q26295711
30, South Street	II	30, South Street, Cliffe			29 October 1985	TQ4222210171; 50°52′25″N 0°01′12″E		1192902	Upload Photo	Q26487572
Brooklands	II	Southover High Street, Southover			29 October 1985	TQ4084109495; 50°52′04″N 0°00′00″E		1043727	Upload Photo	Q26295746
Blackman Tomb 7 Yards South of Church of St John the Baptist	II	Southover High Street			29 October 1985	TQ4128009638; 50°52′08″N 0°00′23″E		1043757	Upload Photo	Q26295779
Blackman Tomb 8 Yards South of Church of St John the Baptist	II	Southover High Street			29 October 1985	TQ4127909636; 50°52′08″N 0°00′23″E		1374942	Upload Photo	Q26655769
Brookside	II	Southover High Street, Southover			25 February 1952	TQ4082609538; 50°52′06″N 0°00′00″W		1192528	Upload Photo	Q26487194
Chest Tomb 2 Yards South of Church of St John the Baptist	II	Southover High Street			29 October 1985	TQ4127209644; 50°52′09″N 0°00′23″E		1043718	Upload Photo	Q26295735
Chest Tomb 25 Yards South of Church of St John the Baptist	II	Southover High Street			29 October 1985	TQ4126109621; 50°52′08″N 0°00′22″E		1043719	Upload Photo	Q26295738
Chest Tomb 4 Yards South of Church of St John the Baptist	II	Southover High Street			29 October 1985	TQ4127409642; 50°52′08″N 0°00′23″E		1286617	Upload Photo	Q26575198
Chest Tomb 4 Yards South of Church of St John the Baptist	II	Southover High Street			29 October 1985	TQ4125809637; 50°52′08″N 0°00′22″E		1374944	Upload Photo	Q26687103
Chest Tomb 7 Yards South of Church of St John the Baptist	II	Southover High Street			29 October 1985	TQ4127409640; 50°52′08″N 0°00′23″E		1353096	Upload Photo	Q26636052
Chest Tomb 8 Yards South of Church of St John the Baptist	II	Southover High Street			29 October 1985	TQ4127309639; 50°52′08″N 0°00′23″E		1192425	Upload Photo	Q26487094
Church of St John the Baptist	I	Southover High Street, Southover			25 February 1952	TQ4126309649; 50°52′09″N 0°00′22″E		1353095	Upload Photo	Q17534917
Elm Trees House	II	Southover High Street, Southover			29 October 1985	TQ4130109749; 50°52′12″N 0°00′24″E		1043737	Upload Photo	Q26295757
Fairhall	II	Southover High Street, Southover			25 February 1952	TQ4095809624; 50°52′08″N 0°00′07″E		1192744	Upload Photo	Q26487420
Former Chancel of the Chapel of the Hospital of St James	II	Southover High Street, Southover			25 February 1952	TQ4130109756; 50°52′12″N 0°00′24″E		1192834	Upload Photo	Q26487503
Fuller Tomb 12 Yards South East of Church of St John the Baptist	II	Southover High Street			29 October 1985	TQ4128209636; 50°52′08″N 0°00′23″E		1043716	Upload Photo	Q26295733
Gables Cottage and Railings	II	Southover High Street, Southover			29 October 1985	TQ4115209643; 50°52′09″N 0°00′17″E		1192777	Upload Photo	Q26487451
Manning Tomb 5 Yards South East of Church of St John the Baptist	II	Southover High Street			29 October 1985	TQ4128709648; 50°52′09″N 0°00′23″E		1043717	Upload Photo	Q26295734
Old Coach House	II	Southover High Street, Southover			29 October 1985	TQ4089009563; 50°52′06″N 0°00′03″E		1192521	Upload Photo	Q26487188
Outbuilding to Southover Manor and Arches to South	II	Southover High Street, Southover			29 October 1985	TQ4113009620; 50°52′08″N 0°00′15″E		1374945	Upload Photo	Q26655772
Plumer Tomb 3 Yards East of Church of St John the Baptist	II	Southover High Street			29 October 1985	TQ4128609658; 50°52′09″N 0°00′23″E		1043720	Upload Photo	Q26295739
Priory Lodge	II	Southover High Street, Southover			29 October 1985	TQ4102509589; 50°52′07″N 0°00′10″E		1286575	Upload Photo	Q26575157
Pump and Wellhead in Grounds of Southover Grange	II	Southover High Street, Southover			29 October 1985	TQ4131809799; 50°52′14″N 0°00′25″E		1043753	Upload Photo	Q26295774
Remains of Town Walls	II	Southover High Street			16 March 1970	TQ4136709867; 50°52′16″N 0°00′28″E		1374931	Upload Photo	Q26687101
Southover Grange	II*	Southover High Street			25 February 1952	TQ4132009834; 50°52′15″N 0°00′25″E		1192300	Upload Photo	Q17555676
Southover Old House	II	Southover High Street, Southover			25 February 1952	TQ4092909574; 50°52′07″N 0°00′05″E		1043725	Upload Photo	Q26295744
Swane Tomb 10 Yards South of Church of St John the Baptist	II	Southover High Street			29 October 1985	TQ4127509636; 50°52′08″N 0°00′23″E		1043756	Upload Photo	Q26295778
The Swan Public House	II	Southover High Street, Southover			16 March 1970	TQ4085809575; 50°52′07″N 0°00′01″E		1192725	Upload Photo	Q26487402
Thorpe and Verrall Tomb 4 Yards South of Church of St John the Baptist	II	Southover High Street			29 October 1985	TQ4127209642; 50°52′08″N 0°00′23″E		1043755	Upload Photo	Q26295777
Verrall Tomb 5 Yards South of Church of St John the Baptist	II	Southover High Street			29 October 1985	TQ4127909640; 50°52′08″N 0°00′23″E		1192427	Upload Photo	Q26487096
Wall to Garden of Southover Old House	II	Southover High Street, Southover			29 October 1985	TQ4094809583; 50°52′07″N 0°00′06″E		1192517	Upload Photo	Q26487184
Wall to South East of Caprons	II	Southover High Street			29 October 1985	TQ4134609858; 50°52′15″N 0°00′27″E		1043695	Upload Photo	Q26295707
Walls and Gazebo to Garden of Fairhall	II	Southover High Street, Southover			29 October 1985	TQ4097909558; 50°52′06″N 0°00′08″E		1043724	Upload Photo	Q26295743
Walls to Southover Pound	II	Southover High Street, Southover			29 October 1985	TQ4124809666; 50°52′09″N 0°00′21″E		1192828	Upload Photo	Q26487498
Woollgar Tomb 4 Yards South of Church of St John the Baptist	II	Southover High Street			29 October 1985	TQ4127709641; 50°52′08″N 0°00′23″E		1374943	Upload Photo	Q26655770
3, 4, 5, Southover High Street	II	3, 4, 5, Southover High Street			16 March 1970	TQ4134109734; 50°52′11″N 0°00′26″E		1353094	Upload Photo	Q26636051
6, Southover High Street	II	6, Southover High Street			16 March 1970	TQ4134409725; 50°52′11″N 0°00′26″E		1192366	Upload Photo	Q26487038
7, Southover High Street	II	7, Southover High Street			29 October 1985	TQ4134609717; 50°52′11″N 0°00′27″E		1043754	Upload Photo	Q26295776
8, Southover High Street	II	8, Southover High Street			29 October 1985	TQ4134709710; 50°52′11″N 0°00′27″E		1192385	Upload Photo	Q26487055
12 and 13, Southover High Street	II	12 and 13, Southover High Street, Southover			25 February 1952	TQ4106909604; 50°52′07″N 0°00′12″E		1043721	Upload Photo	Q26295740
14 and 15, Southover High Street	II	14 and 15, Southover High Street, Southover			25 February 1952	TQ4106409601; 50°52′07″N 0°00′12″E		1286603	Upload Photo	Q26575185
16 and Railings to North, Southover High Street	II	16 And Railings To North, Southover High Street, BN7 1HT			25 February 1952	TQ4105509601; 50°52′07″N 0°00′12″E		1374946	Upload Photo	Q26655773
17, 18, 19, Southover High Street	II	17, 18, 19, Southover High Street, Souuthover			25 February 1952	TQ4104809600; 50°52′07″N 0°00′11″E		1043722	Upload Photo	Q26295741
20, Southover High Street	II	20, Southover High Street, Southover			29 October 1985	TQ4098709586; 50°52′07″N 0°00′08″E		1043723	Upload Photo	Q26295742
21, Southover High Street	II	21, Southover High Street			29 October 1985	TQ4097709580; 50°52′07″N 0°00′08″E		1192514	Upload Photo	Q26487181
25, Southover High Street	II	25, Southover High Street, Southover			29 October 1985	TQ4084409518; 50°52′05″N 0°00′01″E		1043726	Upload Photo	Q26295745
29 and 30, Southover High Street	II	29 and 30, Southover High Street, Southover			16 March 1970	TQ4084909564; 50°52′06″N 0°00′01″E		1043728	Upload Photo	Q26295748
Old Brewery House	II	32, Southover High Street, Southover			29 October 1985	TQ4088309587; 50°52′07″N 0°00′03″E		1043729	Upload Photo	Q26295749
42, Southover High Street	II	42, Southover High Street, Southover			29 October 1985	TQ4101409618; 50°52′08″N 0°00′09″E		1043730	Upload Photo	Q26295750
The Croft and Railings to North	II	43, Southover High Street, Southover			25 February 1952	TQ4102609616; 50°52′08″N 0°00′10″E		1286452	Upload Photo	Q26575050
44, Southover High Street	II	44, Southover High Street, Southover			16 March 1970	TQ4103309620; 50°52′08″N 0°00′10″E		1374947	Upload Photo	Q26655774
45, Southover High Street	II	45, Southover High Street, Southover			16 March 1970	TQ4104009626; 50°52′08″N 0°00′11″E		1043731	Upload Photo	Q26295751
46, Southover High Street	II	46, Southover High Street, Southover			16 March 1970	TQ4105009633; 50°52′08″N 0°00′11″E		1192758	Upload Photo	Q26487433
47, Southover High Street	II	47, Southover High Street, Southover			25 February 1952	TQ4105709624; 50°52′08″N 0°00′12″E		1353083	Upload Photo	Q26636040
48, Southover High Street	II	48, Southover High Street, Southover			29 October 1985	TQ4107309636; 50°52′08″N 0°00′13″E		1192762	Upload Photo	Q26487437
49 and 50, Southover High Street	II	49 and 50, Southover High Street, Southover			25 February 1952	TQ4108309630; 50°52′08″N 0°00′13″E		1043732	Upload Photo	Q26295752
51, Southover High Street	II	51, Southover High Street, Southover			25 February 1952	TQ4108609633; 50°52′08″N 0°00′13″E		1192764	Upload Photo	Q26487439
Anne of Cleves House	II*	52, Southover High Street, BN7 1JA			25 February 1952	TQ4111309633; 50°52′08″N 0°00′15″E		1043733	Upload Photo	Q4768922
53 and 54, Southover High Street	II	53 and 54, Southover High Street, Southover			25 February 1952	TQ4113409645; 50°52′09″N 0°00′16″E		1353084	Upload Photo	Q26636041
56, Southover High Street	II	56, Southover High Street, Southover			25 February 1952	TQ4116309646; 50°52′09″N 0°00′17″E		1043734	Upload Photo	Q26295753
57, Southover High Street	II	57, Southover High Street, Southover			25 February 1952	TQ4120809662; 50°52′09″N 0°00′19″E		1192800	Upload Photo	Q26487472
60, Southover High Street	II	60, Southover High Street, Southover			16 March 1970	TQ4122209665; 50°52′09″N 0°00′20″E		1353085	Upload Photo	Q26636042
61, Southover High Street	II	61, Southover High Street, Southover			16 March 1970	TQ4122809666; 50°52′09″N 0°00′20″E		1192807	Upload Photo	Q26487480
Yew Tree Cottage	II	62, Southover High Street, Southover			25 February 1952	TQ4123609670; 50°52′09″N 0°00′21″E		1043735	Upload Photo	Q26295755
64 and 65, Southover High Street	II	64 and 65, Southover High Street, Southover			29 October 1985	TQ4126009683; 50°52′10″N 0°00′22″E		1043736	Upload Photo	Q26295756
66, Southover High Street	II	66, Southover High Street, Southover			29 October 1985	TQ4126709692; 50°52′10″N 0°00′22″E		1353086	Upload Photo	Q26636043
67 and Railings to South, Southover High Street	II	67 And Railings To South, Southover High Street, BN7 1JA, Southover			25 February 1952	TQ4128509686; 50°52′10″N 0°00′23″E		1192831	Upload Photo	Q26487500
The Pigeon House	II	51b, Southover Street, Southover			29 October 1985	TQ4108609637; 50°52′08″N 0°00′13″E		1286714	Upload Photo	Q26575282
Malling Fields	II	1, 3, 5, Spences Lane, Malling			29 October 1985	TQ4224310901; 50°52′48″N 0°01′14″E		1043703	Upload Photo	Q26295717
Lewes Railway Station	II	Station Road			11 December 1996	TQ4162209822; 50°52′14″N 0°00′41″E		1259556	Upload Photo	Q933911
4, St James Street	II	4, St James Street, Southover			14 May 1984	TQ4126009710; 50°52′11″N 0°00′22″E		1043748	Upload Photo	Q26295769
Lewes Railway Station	II	Station Road, BN7 2UP			10 November 2017	TQ4177909846; 50°52′15″N 0°00′49″E		1450545	Upload Photo	Q66479075
The Mill House	II	The Lynchet			29 October 1985	TQ4217811135; 50°52′56″N 0°01′11″E		1353063	Upload Photo	Q26636020
Registered Offices of Eo Culverwell	II	Thomas Street			29 October 1985	TQ4216010522; 50°52′36″N 0°01′09″E		1043680	Upload Photo	Q26295688
Barn to North West of Landport Farmhouse	II				20 August 1965	TQ4035611358; 50°53′05″N 0°00′22″W		1274822	Upload Photo	Q26564453
Base of Town Mill	II				29 October 1985	TQ4036210093; 50°52′24″N 0°00′23″W		1043885	Upload Photo	Q26295913
Landport Farmhouse	II				20 August 1965	TQ4038011326; 50°53′04″N 0°00′21″W		1222115	Upload Photo	Q26516467

== See also ==
- Grade I listed buildings in East Sussex
- Grade II* listed buildings in East Sussex

== Sources ==
- Antram, Nicholas; Pevsner, Nikolaus (2012) [1965], Sussex: East, The Buildings of England, New Haven and London: Yale University Press, ISBN 978-0-300-18473-0
