= Seaford, East Sussex =

Town in East Sussex, England

Coordinates: 50.77°N 0.10°E

Seaford
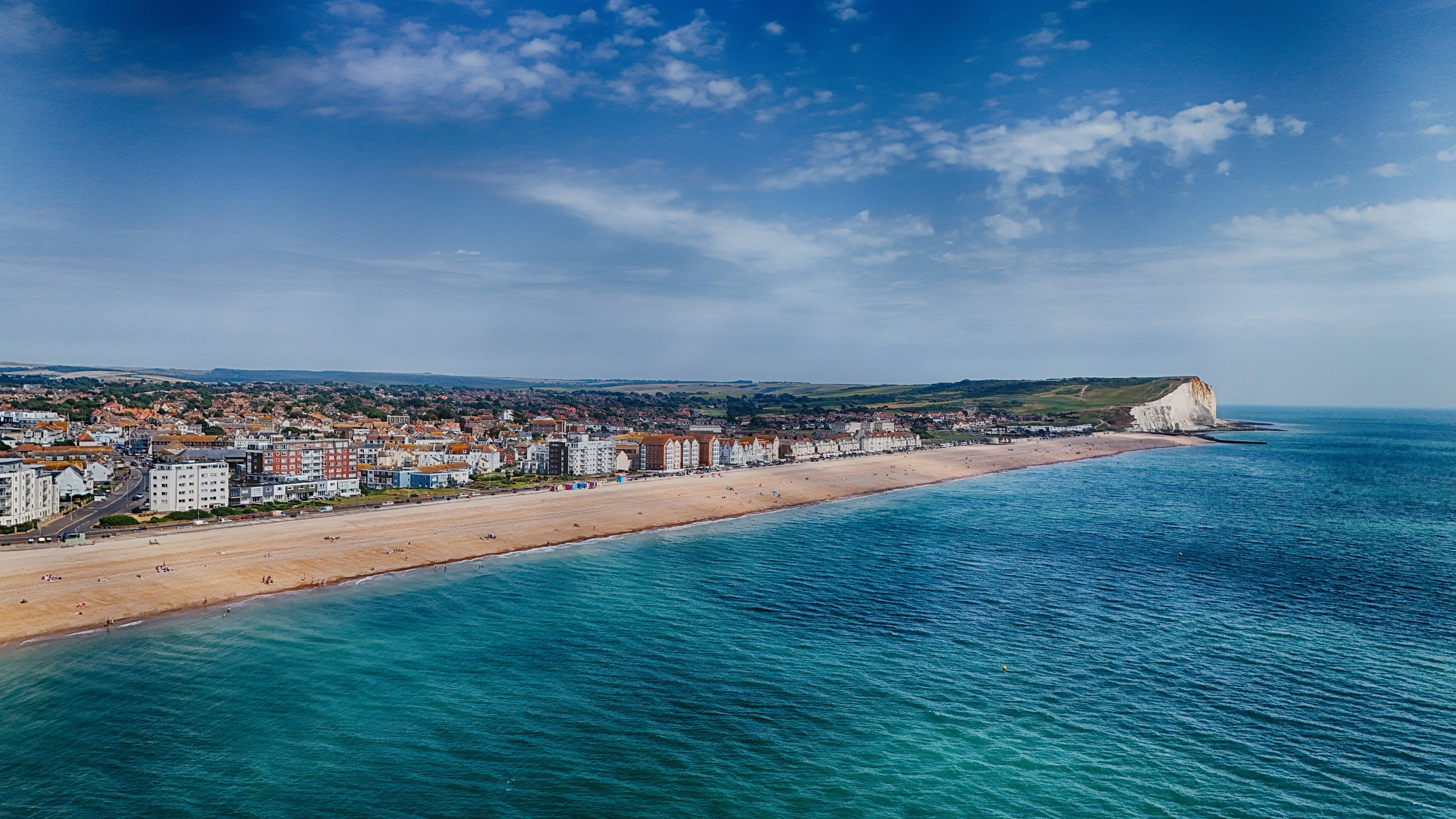
- Seaford viewed from off-shore with the Head in the background

- Location within East Sussex
- Area: 6.327 km^{2} (2.443 sq mi)
- Population: 22,862 (Parish-2011)
  - Density: 3,613/km^{2}
- OS grid reference: TV482990
  - London: 67 miles (108 km) north
- Civil parish: Seaford
- District: Lewes
- Shire county: East Sussex
- Region: South East
- Country: England
- Sovereign state: United Kingdom
- Post town: SEAFORD
- Postcode district: BN25
- Dialling code: 01323
- Police: Sussex
- Fire: East Sussex
- Ambulance: South East Coast
- UK Parliament: Lewes
- Website: Seaford Town Council

Seaford is a town in East Sussex, England, east of Newhaven and west of Eastbourne.

In the Middle Ages, Seaford was one of the main ports serving Southern England, but the town's fortunes declined due to coastal sedimentation silting up its harbour and persistent raids by French pirates. The coastal confederation of Cinque Ports in the middle ages consisted of over forty towns and villages: Seaford was treated as a "limb" (subordinate member) of Hastings. Between 1350 and 1550, the French burned down the town several times. In the 16th century, the people of Seaford were known as the "cormorants" or "shags" because of their enthusiasm for looting ships wrecked in the bay. Local legend has it that Seaford residents would, on occasion, cause ships to run aground by placing fake harbour lights on the cliffs.

Seaford's fortunes revived in the 19th century with the arrival of the railway connecting the town to Lewes and London. It became a small seaside resort town, and more recently a dormitory town for the nearby larger settlements of Eastbourne and Brighton, as well as for London.

The traditional Sussex pronunciation of the name has a full vowel in each syllable: /ˈsiːfɔːrd/ "sea-ford". However, outside Sussex, and increasingly within, it is commonly pronounced with a reduced vowel on the second syllable: /ˈsiːfərd/ SEE-fərd.

== Geography ==
The town lies on the coast near Seaford Head, roughly equidistant between the mouths of the River Ouse and the Cuckmere. The Ouse valley was a wide tidal estuary with its mouth nearly closed by a shingle bar, but the tidal mudflats and salt marshes have been "inned" (protected from the tidal river by dykes) to form grassy freshwater marshes (grazing marsh). To the north the town faces the chalk downland of the South Downs, and along the coast to the east are the Seven Sisters chalk cliffs, and Beachy Head. This stretch of coast is notified for its geological and ecological features as Seaford to Beachy Head Site of Special Scientific Interest.

The River Ouse used to run parallel to the shore behind the shingle bar, entering the sea close to Seaford. However, a major storm in the 16th century broke through the bar at its western end, creating a new river mouth close to the village called Meeching, which was later renamed to Newhaven. Part of the former channel of the river remains as a brackish lagoon.

The town formerly had excellent beaches, which were supplied by longshore drift constantly moving sand along the coast from west to east. However, in the early 20th century a large breakwater was constructed at Newhaven Harbour and the harbour entrance was regularly dredged. These works cut off the supply of fresh sand to the beach. By the 1980s the beach at Seaford had all but vanished, the shoreline becoming steep, narrow and largely composed of small boulders. This made Seaford attractive to watersports enthusiasts (since water visibility was good and there was a rapid drop-off into deep water) but it discouraged more general seaside visitors. So in 1987 an extensive beach replenishment operation was carried out, in which around 1 million tonnes of material was dredged from sandbanks out to sea and deposited on the shore. During a severe storm that October a substantial amount of the deposited material on the upper part of the beach was washed out past low tide level, leading to questions in the House of Commons. The beach has been topped up several times since then, giving the town a broad beach of sand and shingle.

The town's publicity website states: "For many, the main attraction in Seaford is the beach", which draws visitors, particularly during the summer months when sea temperatures can reach up to 20°C (68°F).

To the east of Seaford, below chalk cliffs, is a beach called Hope Gap. It is a location in the film Hope Gap.

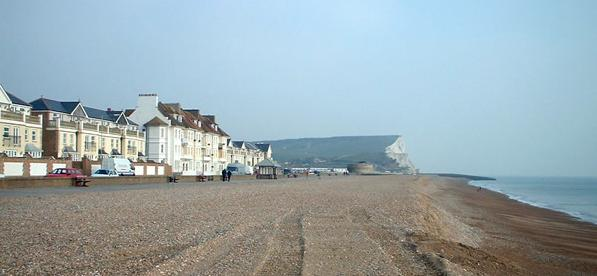
Seaford Beach with Seaford Head in the background.

== History ==
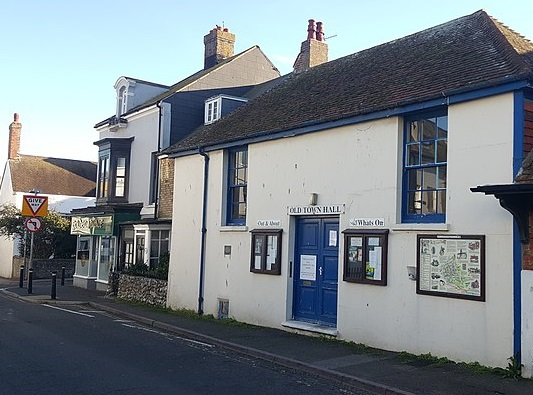
The Old Town Hall

In 1620 and 1624, the bailiff of Seaford was William Levett, of an Anglo-Norman family long seated in Sussex. William Levett of Seaford owned the Bunces and Stonehouse manors in Warbleton, probably inheriting them from his father John Levett, who died in 1607. Levett sold the estates in 1628 and died in 1635, his will being filed in Hastings.

The Old Town Hall in South Street was the meeting place of the borough council, which had the power to elect two members of parliament, until the implementation of the Reform Act 1832.

The Levett family intermarried with other Sussex families, including the Gildredges, the Eversfields, the Popes, the Ashburnhams, the Adamses, and the Chaloners. A seal with his arms belonging to John de Livet, Lord of Firle, was found at Eastbourne in 1851.

== Politics and administration ==
From 1894 to 1974 Seaford was an urban district run by Seaford Urban District Council. In the local government reorganisation of 1974 it became an unparished area which was part of the Lewes District Council area. This loss of independence was unpopular with Seaford residents and in 1999 the town became a civil parish within Lewes, with a town council. Municipal services within Seaford are now provided by three tiers of local government – the county council, the district council and the town council.

The town council has 20 members, four elected by each of five wards. The Seaford Community Partnership is a body incorporating representatives drawn from all three tiers of local government and from local civic groups. The partnership seeks to advise on long-term development strategy for the town. Currently the town council is composed of 10 Conservative, 7 Liberal Democrat and 1 Labour, 1 UKIP and 1 independent councillor.

In the Lewes District council elections on 7 May 2015 the town returned 7 Conservative district Councillors and 3 Liberal Democrat district Councillors. The May 2019 elections returned 8 Conservatives and 2 Liberal Democrats, which those of May 2023 returned 6 Liberal Democrats and 4 Greens. For District elections, the wards are the same five as for the Town council (Central, North, East, West, South) however they only return two Councillors to the District council.

The parliamentary constituency of Seaford was a notorious rotten borough until its disenfranchisement in the Reform Act 1832 when it was incorporated into the Lewes constituency. Seaford returned three members of parliament who went on to become Prime Minister: Henry Pelham represented the town from 1717 to 1722, William Pitt the Elder from 1747 to 1754 and George Canning in 1827.

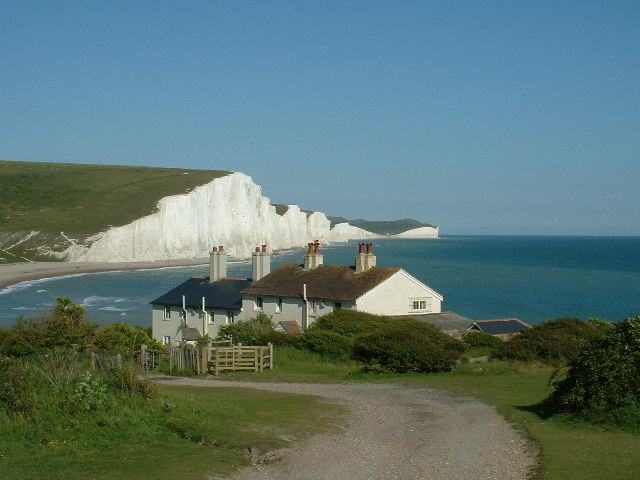
The Seven Sisters chalk cliffs to the east of Seaford

As of July 2024, Liberal Democrat James MacCleary serves as the MP for the Lewes constituency, which includes Seaford. He succeeded Conservative MP Maria Caulfield, who had held the seat since the 2015 General Election. Caulfield, a former NHS nurse, won the seat in 2015 by a narrow margin of 1,083 votes, unseating the previous Liberal Democrat MP, Norman Baker. Baker had represented Lewes for several terms before his defeat in 2015.

Seaford has been twinned with the town of Bönningstedt, Germany, since 1984. Seaford has one of the longest-serving town criers in England and Wales —Peter White— who was appointed to this honorary position in 1977 by Lewes District Council and is now an appointee of Seaford Town Council. In 2012 he was also appointed Serjeant at Mace, and his historic uniform for both crying and mace-bearing is a replica of that worn by 19th. Century Serjeant William Woolgar. (in post 1865 – 1901)

Seaford has the westernmost of the South Coast Martello Towers, number 74, now a local history museum.

Seaford lifeguards patrol the beach and water each weekend and bank holiday from May to September. They are made up of volunteers, mainly young people, who give thousands of unpaid hours every year to train and help keep the public safe. They have been recognised as the best equipped and trained non-RNLI beach lifeguard unit in the country.

== Sport and leisure ==
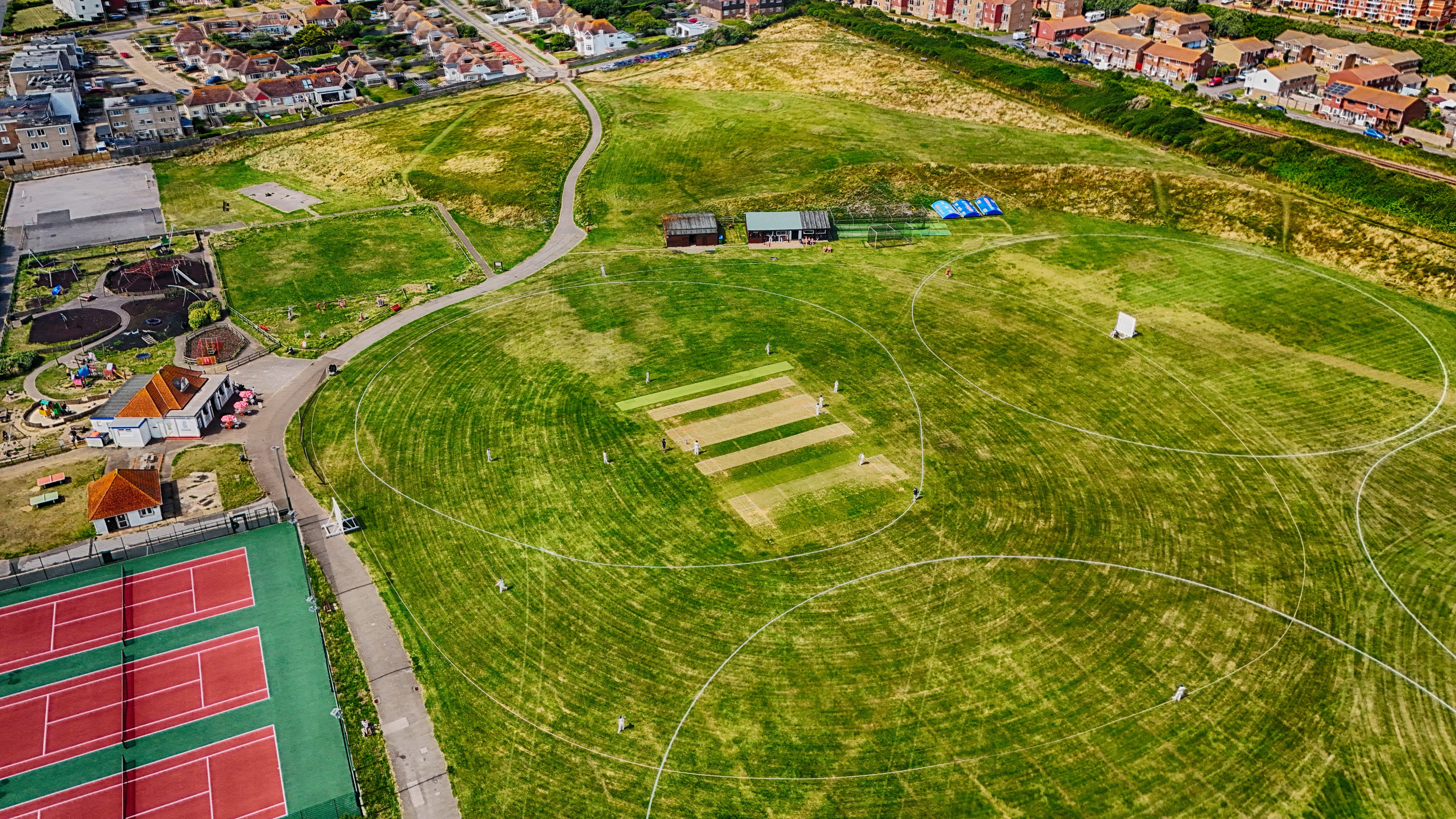
Seaford Cricket Club from the air

Seaford Cricket Club have played at the Salts Recreation Ground since 1946, though the origins of cricket in Seaford go back to the 18th century. The latest augmentation of facilities was in 2010, when the pavilion was extended. Seaford Rugby Football Club, affiliated to the Sussex County Rugby Football Union, play at the same venue, which has the distinction of being below sea-level.

Seaford Town, the local football club, plays at the Crouch Playing Field. They play in the Southern Combination Premier Division.

The town is home to No2 (Seaford) detachment of the Sussex Army Cadet Force, a volunteer youth organisation, sponsored by the Ministry of Defence, which accepts cadets aged between 12 and 18 years of age.

The town has two golf courses, Seaford Golf Club, a downland course at Firle Road, and Seaford Head Golf Course, from which the coastline and the South Downs can be seen.

Seaford has at least two bowling clubs. They include Seaford Bowling Club, which is a private club at Blatchington Road, dating back to 1912, and The Crouch Bowling Club in Crouch Gardens, East Street.

Downs Leisure Centre operates 'The Wave' in Seaford. The Wave is a leisure centre offering a range of sports and pastimes, including badminton, indoor bowls, children's disco dancing, line-dancing and fitness classes. It should not be confused with WAVES, which is a Seaford-based charity supporting families in difficulties.

Swimming facilities are provided for the town at Seaford Head Swimming Pool, which is also run by Wave Leisure.

Towards the western end of Seaford Bay lies Newhaven and Seaford Sailing Club. Founded in 1952 by a group of sailing enthusiasts, the club now has two sites – racing off Seaford Beach and sailing at Piddinghoe Lake near Newhaven where the RYA accredited Sailing School is located.

The area around Seaford, such as up the Cuckmere Valley and along the South Downs Way, offers many walking routes.

== Media ==
Local news and television programmes are provided by BBC South East and ITV Meridian (East). Television signals are received from the relay TV transmitter situated in Newhaven. Local radio stations are BBC Radio Sussex on 95.0 FM broadcast from Brighton, Seahaven FM broadcasts from Eastbourne on 96.3 FM, also online and Heart South on 96.9 FM. The town is served by the local newspaper, The Argus (formerly South Coast Leader).

== Transport ==
Two local half-hourly circular bus services, the 119 and 120, are provided by Cuckmere Buses (Monday-Friday) and Compass Bus on Saturdays, who also run bus 126 from Seaford via Alfriston to Eastbourne.

Brighton & Hove operate two frequent bus services, the 12 (up to every 15 minutes) and the 12X (up to every 12 minutes, limited stop towards Brighton), routed along the A259 south coast road through Seaford (the 12 goes via the Chyngton Estate on the east side of Seaford) which take passengers to Brighton or Eastbourne which both have extensive onward bus services.

Seaford station is the terminus of the Seaford Branch Line. Trains operate to Brighton via Lewes, typically running at a frequency of two trains per hour. Services operated by Southern.

== Notable people ==
Seaford, Sussex by William Collins, 1844

- Maritime painter Robert Back lived in Seaford for most of his life, initially teaching at one of the town's prep schools.
- Sir Anthony Blunt, the former keeper of the Queen's paintings who was revealed to be a Soviet spy, went to school in Seaford.
- Actor Tony Caunter, who played Roy Evans in the BBC soap opera EastEnders, once lived in Seaford.
- Clementine Churchill, wife of British prime minister Winston Churchill, lived in Seaford.
- Actor Nigel Davenport, attended St Peter's School, Seaford.
- Actor Maurice Denham lived in Seaford.
- Composer and concert pianist Norman Fraser retired to Seaford in 1971.
- Paul Garred, drummer of the band The Kooks, grew up in Seaford.
- Comedian Dickie Henderson went to school in Seaford.
- Musician Robyn Hitchcock spent time in Seaford, writing about it in his song "Museum of Sex".
- Chess player David Howell, the UK's youngest grandmaster and British champion, grew up in Seaford.
- Jordan, an actor/model noted for her work with Vivienne Westwood and the Sex boutique in the King's Road area of London in the mid-1970s, was born in Seaford, and worked in the town as a veterinary nurse.
- Actor Dame Penelope Keith went to school in Seaford.
- Former motorcycling stunt rider Eddie Kidd now lives in Seaford.
- Saint Lewine, an early British martyr: her relics were translated to Seaford in 1058 AD.
- Actor Oscar Lloyd, who appears in ITV soap Emmerdale, was born in Seaford.
- Val McCalla, who was voted in 1997 as one of the top 100 black Britons of all time and was the founder of The Voice, lived in Seaford until his death in 2002.
- Michael Olowokandi, from Nigeria, former NBA basketball player for the Minnesota Timberwolves and most recently the Boston Celtics 2006–2007, went to school for a short time at Newlands Manor School, Seaford.
- Don Partridge, singer-songwriter, lived in Seaford.
- Twin sisters Connie Powney and Cassie Powney, who played Mel and Sophie Burton in Channel 4 soap Hollyoaks, grew up in Seaford.
- Grace Robertson photographer for Picture Post lived in Seaford with her husband Thurston Hopkins, also a photojournalist, from the 1980s up until her death at age 90 in 2021.
- Actress Margaret Rutherford went to school in Seaford.
- The astronaut Piers Sellers attended Tyttenhanger Lodge Preparatory School, Seaford.
- Woodcut artist Eric Slater lived and died in Seaford, and is buried there.
- Bruce Stewart, writer of the 1970, ITV series Timeslip, lived in Seaford.
- Pete Thomas, drummer with a 30-year association with Elvis Costello, was brought up in Seaford.
- Tennessee Thomas, drummer of The Like and fashion model, lived in Seaford before moving to California.
- Colin Wells, ex-professional cricketer for Sussex and Derbyshire, lives in Seaford.

== Education ==
Between the late 19th century and the 1950s, Seaford was renowned as a "school town". The many preparatory schools and other independent schools were the main employers in the town. In the 1960s, Sutton Avenue had a road sign warning "7 schools in next mile". Sunday mornings in term-time were marked by "crocodiles" of schoolchildren from each of the preparatory schools walking to church for the special schools' service.

Most of these independent schools, such as Ladycross School and St Peter's School were closed and the land used for new housing estates in the last decades of the 20th century. The last girls' school, Micklefield, closed in 1994.

Although it has many primary schools (Chyngton, Cradle Hill, Annecy, Seaford County Primary), from the nursery to the "sixth year" of education, the town of Seaford has only one state-run secondary school, Seaford Head School, which in 2009 closed its sixth form, but re-opened it in 2014. Seaford was also home to an independent school, Newlands Preparatory and Manor, which included a specialist unit for pupils with specific learning difficulties. However, the school closed for good in July 2014. Its previous site is currently being redeveloped into a housing estate.

The town is also home to a special needs boarding school called Bowden House which is run by Tower Hamlets Council.

== Places of worship ==
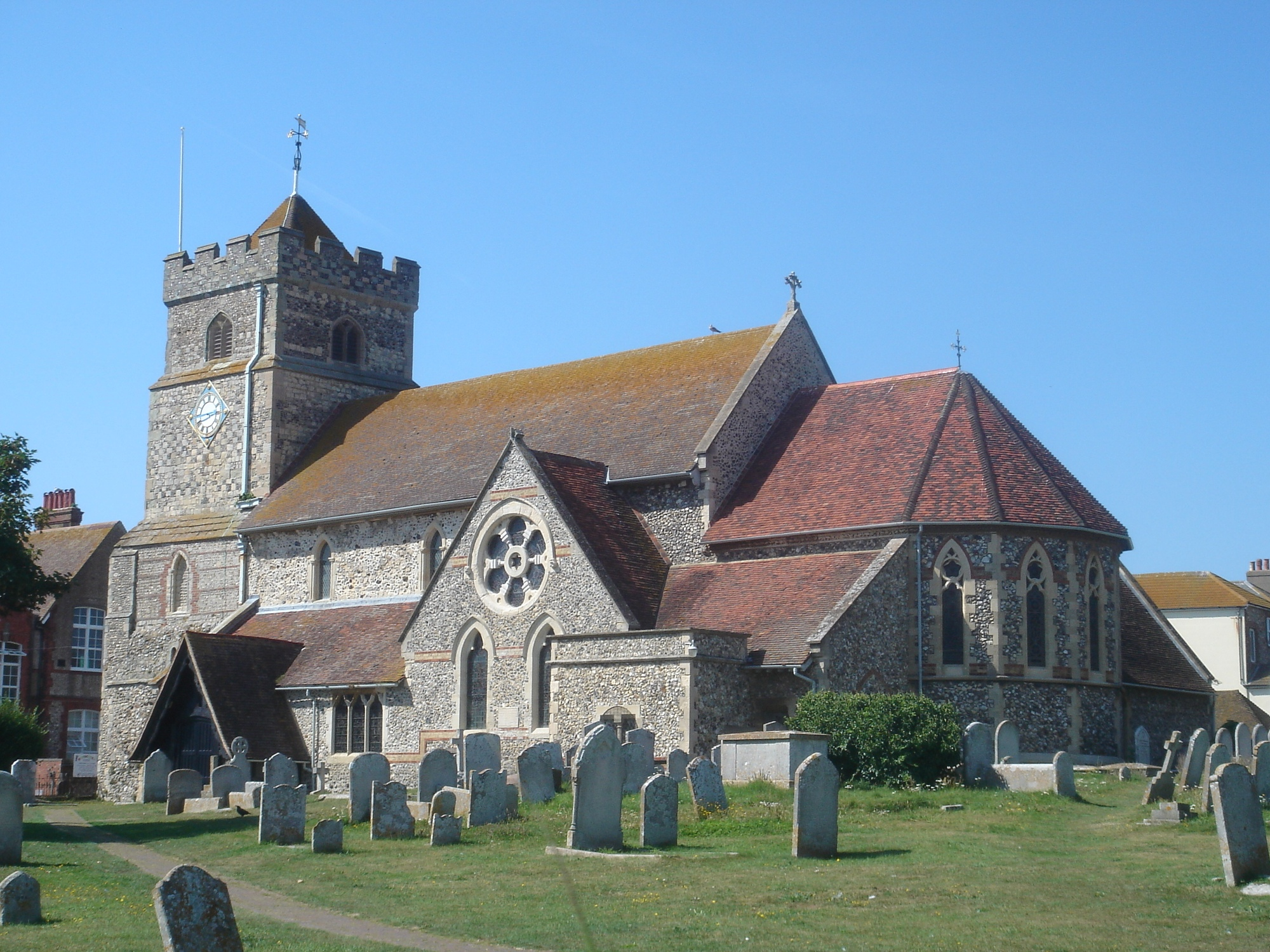
St Leonard's Church, in the town centre, has 11th-century origins.

Parts of the nave, aisles and clerestory of the Church of England parish church of St Leonard are Norman work from the 11th century. The north and south arcades and most of the clerestory windows are Early English Gothic. The tower is 14th century and its upper part is Perpendicular Gothic. The transepts and polygonal apse are Gothic Revival additions designed by John Billing and built in 1861–82. There is some modern stained glass by the Cox & Barnard firm of Hove. The church is a Grade I listed building. St Luke's Church, opened in 1959 and built of flint and brick, serves the Chyngton and Sutton suburbs of the town. It has been attributed to architect John Leopold Denman.

The Roman Catholic Church of St Thomas More was built in 1935 to replace a chapel in the grounds of Bishop of Southwark Francis Bourne's home nearby. James O'Hanlon Hughes and Geoffrey Welch designed the flint and render building, which was extended in 1969 using artificial stone.

W.F. Poulton designed a Gothic Revival chapel for Congregationalists in 1877. The flint building has a distinctive corner turret. It is now a United Reformed church with the name Cross Way Clinton Centre, and has links with the town's Methodist church, now called Cross Way Church. This was built in the Gothic Revival style of red brick in 1894. A town-centre Baptist chapel was demolished in 1973 and replaced by a new brown-brick circular church on the road to East Blatchington. Elsewhere in the town, there is a Jehovah's Witnesses Kingdom Hall, a Spiritualist church and an Evangelical church (the Seaford Community Church in Vale Road).

There is a Quaker meeting in the town every Sunday in The Little Theatre in Steyne Road and the Quakers maintain a Peace Garden nearby.

== Military ==
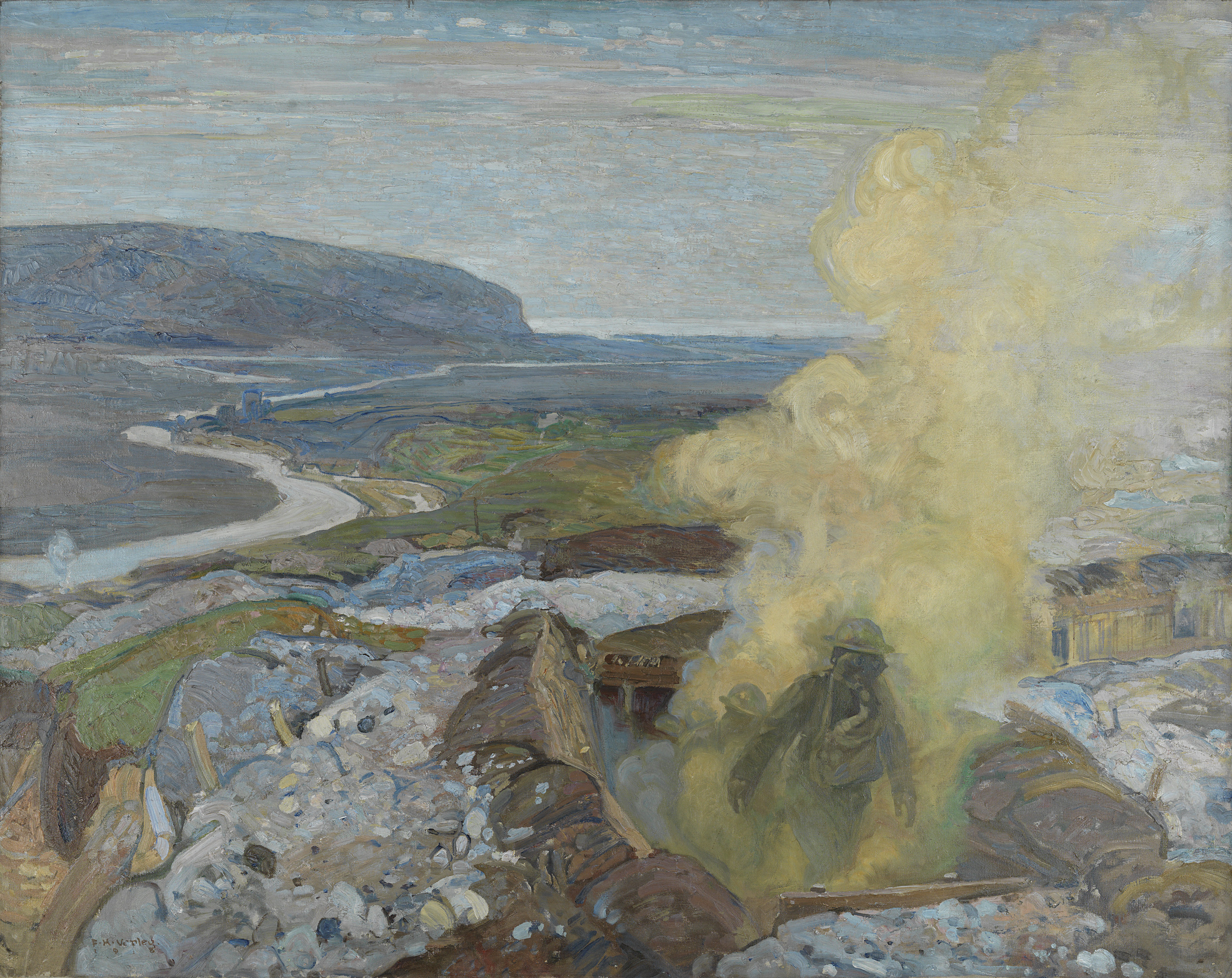
This painting by F.H. Varley depicts a WWI training exercise in Seaford. Soldiers emerge from a gas hut wearing gas masks.

The Romans are known to have had a camp in Seaford. From 1794 coastal defence barracks were established at East Blatchington. In 1806–1808 a Martello Tower was built at the eastern end of Seaford Bay. It is the most westerly of the towers, numbered tower 74.

During the First and Second World Wars there were large military camps in the town. In the First World War, the camps were built to house the 22nd Division from Kitchener's Third New Army. The south camp nearly encircled Seaford ladies college. In December 1914 there was a strike by a mainly Welsh regiment over the remoteness of the accommodation and mud. In 1919 two thousand Canadians rioted after one of them was beaten by a camp picket for walking with his hands in his pockets.

Seaford has seven Victoria Cross holders associated with the town:

- William George Walker lived and died in Seaford
- Cuthbert Bromley lived in Seaford
- William Frederick McFadzean trained at the North Camp, Seaford
- Geoffrey Charles Tasker Keyes attended King's Mead School, Seaford
- David Auldjo Jamieson attended Ladycross School, Seaford
- Claud Raymond lived in Seaford
- H. Jones attended St Peter's School, Seaford

== Twin towns ==
Seaford is twinned with:

- Bönningstedt, Germany
- Crivitz, Germany

== Freedom of the Town ==
The following people and military units have received the Freedom of the Town of Seaford.

=== Individuals ===
- Field Marshal Charles Lennox, 3rd Duke of Richmond: 1789.
- William Pitt the Younger: 1789.
- Neil Moffett: 1980.
- Laurie Holland: 30 September 2012.
- Donald Mabey: 30 September 2012.
- Keith Blackburn: February 2019.

=== Military Units ===
- 210 (Sussex) Field Squadron, RE (TA): 1959.

== See also ==
- Seaford Museum
- Seaford Head Nature Reserve
- Seaford railway station, East Sussex
- Bishopstone
- Bishopstone railway station
- Tide Mills, East Sussex
- East Blatchington
- Alfriston
- Seahaven FM 96.3 Ofcom licensed Community Radio Station based in Seaford
- St. Leonard's & St. Luke's Churches
- Listed buildings in Seaford, East Sussex
