= Listed buildings in Lewes (town centre) =

Historic structures in East Sussex, England

Lewes is a town and civil parish in East Sussex, England. It contains nine grade I, 22 grade II* and 499 grade II listed buildings that are recorded in the National Heritage List for England.

This list is based on the information retrieved online from Historic England.

The number of listed buildings in Lewes requires subdivision into geographically defined lists. This list includes all listed buildings in the town centre, defined as the area around the High Street.

== Key ==
Grade	Criteria
I	Buildings that are of exceptional interest
II*	Particularly important buildings of more than special interest
II	Buildings that are of special interest

== Listing ==
Name	Grade	Location	Type	Completed (Note: The date given is the date used by Historic England as significant for the initial building or that of an important part in the structure's description.)	Date designated	Grid ref. (Note: The grid reference is based on the British national grid reference system, sometimes known as OSGB36, used by the Ordnance Survey.) Geo-coordinates	Notes	Entry number (Note: The "List Entry Number" is a unique number assigned to each listed building and scheduled monument by Historic England.)	Image	
Abinger House	II	Abinger Place			25 February 1952	TQ4145810360; 50°52′32″N 0°00′33″E		1353007	Upload Photo	Q26635967
Church of St John Sub Castro	II	Abinger Place			16 March 1970	TQ4146810426; 50°52′34″N 0°00′34″E		1043886	Upload Photo	Q5117439
Churchyard Walls to the Church of St John Sub Castro	II	Abinger Place			16 March 1970	TQ4145510425; 50°52′34″N 0°00′33″E		1353006	Upload Photo	Q26635966
K6 Telephone Kiosk	II	Abinger Place			17 February 1989	TQ4143810299; 50°52′30″N 0°00′32″E		1262116	Upload Photo	Q26553012
Russian Memorial in the Churchyard of St John Sub Castro	II	Abinger Place			29 October 1985	TQ4152210471; 50°52′35″N 0°00′37″E		1043887	Upload Photo	Q7382081
23 and 25, Abinger Place	II	23 and 25, Abinger Place			29 October 1985	TQ4145510350; 50°52′31″N 0°00′33″E		1043888	Upload Photo	Q26295915
27 and 29, Abinger Place	II	27 and 29, Abinger Place			29 October 1985	TQ4145410346; 50°52′31″N 0°00′33″E		1043889	Upload Photo	Q26295916
47, Abinger Place	II	47, Abinger Place			29 October 1985	TQ4144110305; 50°52′30″N 0°00′32″E		1353008	Upload Photo	Q26635968
Former Lewes Public Library	II	Albion Street, BN7 2ND			11 May 1970	TQ4172310272; 50°52′28″N 0°00′47″E		1043891	Upload Photo	Q26295918
Regency House and Railings	II	1, Albion Street			29 October 1985	TQ4171510201; 50°52′26″N 0°00′46″E		1043890	Upload Photo	Q26295917
2-10 and Railings to East, Albion Street	II	Albion Street, BN7 2ND			16 March 1970	TQ4170610238; 50°52′27″N 0°00′46″E		1353009	Upload Photo	Q26635969
11 and Railings to East, Albion Street	II	Albion Street, BN7 2ND			16 March 1970	TQ4169710269; 50°52′28″N 0°00′45″E		1293940	Upload Photo	Q26581831
Wall on West Side of Brooman's Lane	II	Brooman's Lane			29 October 1985	TQ4169510129; 50°52′24″N 0°00′45″E		1293897	Upload Photo	Q26581793
8, Castle Bank	II	8, Castle Bank			29 October 1985	TQ4141310235; 50°52′28″N 0°00′31″E		1353010	Upload Photo	Q26635970
9 and 10, Castle Banks	II	9 and 10, Castle Banks			30 June 1988	TQ4141210225; 50°52′27″N 0°00′31″E		1374929	Upload Photo	Q26655756
Beard's Brewery Store	II	Castle Ditch Lane			15 June 1984	TQ4147810187; 50°52′26″N 0°00′34″E		1043893	Upload Photo	Q26295921
Star Brewery Gallery	II	Castle Ditch Lane, BN7 1YJ			15 June 1984	TQ4149610185; 50°52′26″N 0°00′35″E		1353024	Upload Photo	Q26635983
Store	II	Castle Ditch Lane			29 October 1985	TQ4148010118; 50°52′24″N 0°00′34″E		1190306	Upload Photo	Q26493919
Barbican to Lewes Castle and Walls to South	I	Castle Gate			25 February 1952	TQ4140210071; 50°52′22″N 0°00′30″E		1043895	Upload Photo	Q17534679
Bartholomew House and Railings	II	Castle Gate			25 February 1952	TQ4138910044; 50°52′21″N 0°00′29″E		1190307	Upload Photo	Q26493920
Castle Lodge and Stable Wing	II	Castle Gate			16 March 1970	TQ4137810090; 50°52′23″N 0°00′29″E		1043896	Upload Photo	Q26295922
Castlegate House and Railings to West	II	Castle Gate			16 March 1970	TQ4141610105; 50°52′23″N 0°00′31″E		1293876	Upload Photo	Q26581774
Keep to Lewes Castle	I	Castle Gate			25 February 1952	TQ4132710068; 50°52′22″N 0°00′26″E		1043894	Upload Photo	Q386703
Remains of Inner Gatehouse and Walls to East and West	I	Castle Gate			16 March 1970	TQ4140610084; 50°52′23″N 0°00′30″E		1293875	Upload Photo	Q122830568
Remains of the Curtain Wall of Lewes Castle in the Garden of Castlegate House	II	Castle Gate			29 October 1985	TQ4145610110; 50°52′23″N 0°00′33″E		1043897	Upload Photo	Q26295923
Remains of the Curtain Wall of Lewes Castle to the South and East of the Bowling Green Car Park	II	Castle Gate			16 March 1970	TQ4147910147; 50°52′25″N 0°00′34″E		1190325	Upload Photo	Q26493934
Bowling Green Pavilion	II	Castle Precincts			29 October 1985	TQ4138610134; 50°52′24″N 0°00′29″E		1043899	Upload Photo	Q26295925
Brack Mound House	II	Castle Precincts			25 February 1952	TQ4143010203; 50°52′27″N 0°00′32″E		1043898	Upload Photo	Q26295924
Castle Precincts and Right Wing	II	Castle Precincts			25 February 1952	TQ4135610154; 50°52′25″N 0°00′28″E		1043900	Upload Photo	Q26295926
Castle Precincts Cottage	II	Castle Precincts			29 October 1985	TQ4137010175; 50°52′26″N 0°00′28″E		1293841	Upload Photo	Q26581742
The Maltings	II	Castle Precincts			29 October 1985	TQ4144810184; 50°52′26″N 0°00′32″E		1190333	Upload Photo	Q26493942
Walls on East and West Sides	II	Church Twitten			24 January 1984	TQ4171510047; 50°52′21″N 0°00′46″E		1293853	Upload Photo	Q26581753
2, East Street	II	2, East Street			29 October 1985	TQ4167410292; 50°52′29″N 0°00′44″E		1353041	Upload Photo	Q26636000
3 and 4, East Street	II	3 and 4, East Street			29 October 1985	TQ4168410296; 50°52′29″N 0°00′45″E		1293647	Upload Photo	Q26581566
5 and 6, East Street	II	5 and 6, East Street			29 October 1985	TQ4169110297; 50°52′29″N 0°00′45″E		1043880	Upload Photo	Q26295907
7 and 8, East Street	II	7 and 8, East Street			21 May 1985	TQ4169910302; 50°52′29″N 0°00′45″E		1190770	Upload Photo	Q26485521
9 and 10, East Street	II	9 and 10, East Street			29 October 1985	TQ4170910302; 50°52′29″N 0°00′46″E		1353042	Upload Photo	Q26636001
11, East Street	II	11, East Street			29 October 1985	TQ4171910305; 50°52′30″N 0°00′46″E		1190788	Upload Photo	Q26485538
12 and 13, East Street	II	12 and 13, East Street			29 October 1985	TQ4172310303; 50°52′29″N 0°00′47″E		1043881	Upload Photo	Q26295908
14, East Street	II	14, East Street			29 October 1985	TQ4173310302; 50°52′29″N 0°00′47″E		1190792	Upload Photo	Q26485542
15, East Street	II	15, East Street			29 October 1985	TQ4173810304; 50°52′29″N 0°00′47″E		1043882	Upload Photo	Q26295910
16, East Street	II	16, East Street			29 October 1985	TQ4174110306; 50°52′30″N 0°00′48″E		1293660	Upload Photo	Q26581577
17, East Street	II	17, East Street			25 February 1952	TQ4175010306; 50°52′30″N 0°00′48″E		1353043	Upload Photo	Q26636002
6, Eastgate Street	II	6, Eastgate Street			25 February 1952	TQ4179810305; 50°52′29″N 0°00′51″E		1043883	Upload Photo	Q26295911
Town Hall	II	Fisher Street			25 February 1952	TQ4154510154; 50°52′25″N 0°00′37″E		1353072	Upload Photo	Q26636029
5, Fisher Street	II	5, Fisher Street			25 February 1952	TQ4150910161; 50°52′25″N 0°00′36″E		1043842	Upload Photo	Q26295866
7-17, Fisher Street	II	7-17, Fisher Street, BN7 2DG			25 February 1952	TQ4149410216; 50°52′27″N 0°00′35″E		1043843	Upload Photo	Q26295867
10, Fisher Street	II	10, Fisher Street, BN7 2DG			29 October 1985	TQ4150710196; 50°52′26″N 0°00′35″E		1353025	Upload Photo	Q26635984
19 and 21, Fisher Street	II	19 and 21, Fisher Street			29 October 1985	TQ4149510240; 50°52′28″N 0°00′35″E		1043844	Upload Photo	Q26295868
23, Fisher Street	II	23, Fisher Street			30 June 1988	TQ4149510244; 50°52′28″N 0°00′35″E		1043692	Upload Photo	Q26295703
32 Friars Walk, Lewes	II	32, Friar's Walk, BN7 2LE			29 October 1985	TQ4179610067; 50°52′22″N 0°00′50″E		1353031	Upload Photo	Q26635990
All Saint's Community Centre	II*	Friar's Walk			25 February 1952	TQ4175810024; 50°52′20″N 0°00′48″E		1191009	Upload Photo	Q17555654
Archway to Churchyard of All Saints'	II	Friar's Walk			25 February 1952	TQ4179910047; 50°52′21″N 0°00′50″E		1043858	Upload Photo	Q26295884
Attwood Monument 25 Yards North West of All Saints' Church	II	Friar's Walk			29 October 1985	TQ4174010019; 50°52′20″N 0°00′47″E		1043857	Upload Photo	Q26295883
Fountain to South of All Saints' Church	II	Friar's Walk			29 October 1985	TQ4179710041; 50°52′21″N 0°00′50″E		1191043	Upload Photo	Q26485789
Gates to West of the Church of All Saints'	II	Friar's Walk			29 October 1985	TQ4173109996; 50°52′20″N 0°00′47″E		1043856	Upload Photo	Q26295882
Pair of Chest Tombs 8 Yards South of All Saints' Church	II	Friar's Walk			29 October 1985	TQ4176810014; 50°52′20″N 0°00′49″E		1191039	Upload Photo	Q26485785
Saxby Monument 20 Yards West North West of All Saints' Church	II	Friar's Walk			29 October 1985	TQ4173910015; 50°52′20″N 0°00′47″E		1293535	Upload Photo	Q26581465
Verrall Tomb 5 Yards South of All Saints' Church	II	Friar's Walk			29 October 1985	TQ4175210007; 50°52′20″N 0°00′48″E		1353030	Upload Photo	Q26635989
1, Friar's Walk	II	1, Friar's Walk			29 October 1985	TQ4184410116; 50°52′23″N 0°00′53″E		1353026	Upload Photo	Q26635985
2 and 3, Friar's Walk	II	2 and 3, Friar's Walk			29 October 1985	TQ4183710105; 50°52′23″N 0°00′52″E		1043846	Upload Photo	Q26295871
4 and 5, Friar's Walk	II	4 and 5, Friar's Walk			29 October 1985	TQ4183710101; 50°52′23″N 0°00′52″E		1043847	Upload Photo	Q26295872
6, Friar's Walk	II	6, Friar's Walk			29 October 1985	TQ4183410091; 50°52′23″N 0°00′52″E		1353027	Upload Photo	Q26635986
6a, Friar's Walk	II	6a, Friar's Walk			29 October 1985	TQ4183410086; 50°52′22″N 0°00′52″E		1190941	Upload Photo	Q26485697
7, Friar's Walk	II	7, Friar's Walk			29 October 1985	TQ4183210081; 50°52′22″N 0°00′52″E		1043848	Upload Photo	Q26295873
8 and 9, Friar's Walk	II	8 and 9, Friar's Walk			29 October 1985	TQ4183110072; 50°52′22″N 0°00′52″E		1190950	Upload Photo	Q26485704
10 and 11, Friar's Walk	II	10 and 11, Friar's Walk			29 October 1985	TQ4182610059; 50°52′21″N 0°00′52″E		1353028	Upload Photo	Q26635987
12, Friar's Walk	II	12, Friar's Walk			29 October 1985	TQ4182310055; 50°52′21″N 0°00′51″E		1293542	Upload Photo	Q26581471
13, 14, 15, Friar's Walk	II	13, 14, 15, Friar's Walk			29 October 1985	TQ4181810045; 50°52′21″N 0°00′51″E		1043849	Upload Photo	Q26295874
19, Friar's Walk	II	19, Friar's Walk			29 October 1985	TQ4178710009; 50°52′20″N 0°00′50″E		1190962	Upload Photo	Q26485716
20, Friar's Walk	II	20, Friar's Walk			29 October 1985	TQ4178310006; 50°52′20″N 0°00′49″E		1353029	Upload Photo	Q26635988
21, Friar's Walk	II	21, Friar's Walk			29 October 1985	TQ4178010003; 50°52′20″N 0°00′49″E		1293546	Upload Photo	Q26581475
22, Friar's Walk	II	22, Friar's Walk			6 December 1984	TQ4177610001; 50°52′20″N 0°00′49″E		1043850	Upload Photo	Q26295875
23, Friar's Walk	II	23, Friar's Walk			29 October 1985	TQ4177309998; 50°52′20″N 0°00′49″E		1043851	Upload Photo	Q26295876
24, Friar's Walk	II	24, Friar's Walk			29 October 1985	TQ4176809996; 50°52′20″N 0°00′49″E		1190974	Upload Photo	Q26485727
25, Friar's Walk	II	25, Friar's Walk			29 October 1985	TQ4176509991; 50°52′19″N 0°00′48″E		1043852	Upload Photo	Q26295878
26, Friar's Walk	II	26, Friar's Walk			29 October 1985	TQ4176109990; 50°52′19″N 0°00′48″E		1190977	Upload Photo	Q26485730
27, Friar's Walk	II	27, Friar's Walk			29 October 1985	TQ4175709987; 50°52′19″N 0°00′48″E		1043853	Upload Photo	Q26295879
28, Friar's Walk	II	28, Friar's Walk			29 October 1985	TQ4175309984; 50°52′19″N 0°00′48″E		1191006	Upload Photo	Q26485758
29 and 30, Friar's Walk	II	29 and 30, Friar's Walk			29 October 1985	TQ4174209981; 50°52′19″N 0°00′47″E		1043854	Upload Photo	Q26295880
31, Friar's Walk	II	31, Friar's Walk			29 October 1985	TQ4173709980; 50°52′19″N 0°00′47″E		1043855	Upload Photo	Q26295881
1 and 2, Garden Cottages	II	1 and 2, Garden Cottages, Castle Banks, BN7 1UX			30 June 1988	TQ4140010223; 50°52′27″N 0°00′30″E		1043691	Upload Photo	Q26295702
Barnard Tomb 5 Yards North of Vestry of Church of St Michael	II	High Street			29 October 1985	TQ4132110015; 50°52′21″N 0°00′26″E		1191586	Upload Photo	Q26486301
Bing Tomb 12 Yards North East of the Church of St Michael	II	High Street			29 October 1985	TQ4130710009; 50°52′20″N 0°00′25″E		1043816	Upload Photo	Q26295839
Chest Tomb 5 Yards North of Vestry of Church of St Michael	II	High Street			29 October 1985	TQ4132310016; 50°52′21″N 0°00′26″E		1043815	Upload Photo	Q26295838
Church of St Michael and Railings	I	High Street			25 February 1952	TQ4132210002; 50°52′20″N 0°00′26″E		1287005	Upload Photo	Q17534885
Crown Hotel	II*	High Street			25 February 1952	TQ4158410164; 50°52′25″N 0°00′39″E		1191714	Upload Photo	Q17555670
Fitzroy Memorial Library	II	High Street			11 May 1970	TQ4184710206; 50°52′26″N 0°00′53″E		1043859	Upload Photo	Q26295885
Garden Cottage to West of No 111	II	High Street			25 February 1952	TQ4109409966; 50°52′19″N 0°00′14″E		1353044	Upload Photo	Q26636003
Gazebo to Rear of No 103	II	High Street			25 February 1952	TQ4122809926; 50°52′18″N 0°00′21″E		1043800	Upload Photo	Q26295823
Law Courts	II*	High Street			25 February 1952	TQ4150210114; 50°52′24″N 0°00′35″E		1043780	Upload Photo	Q6536124
Market Tower	II	High Street			25 February 1952	TQ4159110170; 50°52′25″N 0°00′40″E		1353073	Upload Photo	Q26636030
Newcastle House	II	High Street			25 February 1952	TQ4148010099; 50°52′23″N 0°00′34″E		1043779	Upload Photo	Q26295803
No 111 and Railings to North	II*	High Street			25 February 1952	TQ4110709969; 50°52′19″N 0°00′15″E		1043804	Upload Photo	Q17555585
Pelham Arms Hotel	II	High Street			25 February 1952	TQ4099510010; 50°52′21″N 0°00′09″E		1191429	Upload Photo	Q26486158
Riverside	II	High Street, BN7 2RE			29 October 1985	TQ4192610206; 50°52′26″N 0°00′57″E		1293504	Upload Photo	Q26581435
Shelley's Hotel and Railings to South	II*	High Street			25 February 1952	TQ4110110004; 50°52′20″N 0°00′14″E		1191443	Upload Photo	Q17555662
St Michael's Church Hall	II	High Street			29 October 1985	TQ4130209992; 50°52′20″N 0°00′25″E		1353049	Upload Photo	Q26636008
Stables to Rear of Lewes House	II	High Street			25 February 1952	TQ4167110105; 50°52′23″N 0°00′44″E		1043820	Upload Photo	Q26295844
Storage Chamber and Tunnel to Rear of Nos 20-21	II	High Street			23 March 2011	TQ4175210140; 50°52′24″N 0°00′48″E		1242954	Upload Photo	Q26535672
The Croft (adjacent to County Hall)	II	High Street			22 February 2006	TQ4101409944; 50°52′18″N 0°00′10″E		1391832	Upload Photo	Q26671175
The Old Grammar School	II	High Street			25 February 1965	TQ4115010006; 50°52′20″N 0°00′17″E		1043811	Upload Photo	Q26295833
Wall to South East of Lewes House	II	High Street			29 October 1985	TQ4170910105; 50°52′23″N 0°00′46″E		1353053	Upload Photo	Q26636010
Wall to South of Lewes House	II	High Street			29 October 1985	TQ4169610089; 50°52′23″N 0°00′45″E		1043821	Upload Photo	Q26295845
Westgate Chapel	II*	High Street			25 February 1952	TQ4129309954; 50°52′19″N 0°00′24″E		1043839	Upload Photo	Q17555602
11, High Street	II	11, High Street			29 October 1985	TQ4182010203; 50°52′26″N 0°00′51″E		1293509	Upload Photo	Q26581440
13/13a, High Street	II	13/13a, High Street			6 December 1984	TQ4180810202; 50°52′26″N 0°00′51″E		1353032	Upload Photo	Q26635991
14, High Street	II	14, High Street			6 December 1984	TQ4179610202; 50°52′26″N 0°00′50″E		1191069	Upload Photo	Q26485812
17, High Street	II	17, High Street			29 October 1985	TQ4177310194; 50°52′26″N 0°00′49″E		1043860	Upload Photo	Q26295887
18 and 18a, High Street	II	18 and 18a, High Street			29 October 1985	TQ4176410191; 50°52′26″N 0°00′49″E		1293518	Upload Photo	Q26581448
19, High Street	II	19, High Street			29 October 1985	TQ4175710190; 50°52′26″N 0°00′48″E		1043861	Upload Photo	Q26295888
22, High Street	II	22, High Street			29 October 1985	TQ4173810179; 50°52′25″N 0°00′47″E		1353033	Upload Photo	Q26635992
23, High Street	II	23, High Street			25 February 1952	TQ4172610173; 50°52′25″N 0°00′47″E		1191086	Upload Photo	Q26485827
30 and 31, High Street	II	30 and 31, High Street			25 February 1952	TQ4168010157; 50°52′25″N 0°00′44″E		1043862	Upload Photo	Q26295889
Lewes House	II*	32, High Street			25 February 1952	TQ4166310147; 50°52′24″N 0°00′43″E		1353052	Upload Photo	Q17555860
School Hill House	II*	33, High Street			25 February 1952	TQ4164610141; 50°52′24″N 0°00′43″E		1043822	Upload Photo	Q17555591
34, High Street	II	34, High Street			16 March 1970	TQ4163210138; 50°52′24″N 0°00′42″E		1353054	Upload Photo	Q26636011
35, High Street	II	35, High Street			16 March 1970	TQ4162710135; 50°52′24″N 0°00′42″E		1043823	Upload Photo	Q26295846
36 and 37, High Street	II	36 and 37, High Street			16 March 1970	TQ4161910133; 50°52′24″N 0°00′41″E		1353055	Upload Photo	Q26636012
38, High Street	II	38, High Street			16 March 1970	TQ4161110129; 50°52′24″N 0°00′41″E		1043824	Upload Photo	Q26295847
39 and 40, High Street	II	39 and 40, High Street			25 February 1952	TQ4160410128; 50°52′24″N 0°00′40″E		1043825	Upload Photo	Q26295848
41, High Street	II	41, High Street			25 February 1952	TQ4159710121; 50°52′24″N 0°00′40″E		1191157	Upload Photo	Q26485899
Flint House	II	41, High Street			29 October 1985	TQ4160210112; 50°52′23″N 0°00′40″E		1043752	Upload Photo	Q26295773
42, High Street	II	42, High Street			25 February 1952	TQ4158710119; 50°52′24″N 0°00′39″E		1353056	Upload Photo	Q26636013
43, High Street	II	43, High Street			25 February 1952	TQ4158210116; 50°52′24″N 0°00′39″E		1293446	Upload Photo	Q26581383
44, High Street	II	44, High Street			25 February 1952	TQ4157610112; 50°52′23″N 0°00′39″E		1043826	Upload Photo	Q26295849
45/46, High Street	II	45/46, High Street			25 February 1952	TQ4156410104; 50°52′23″N 0°00′38″E		1191212	Upload Photo	Q26485951
49, High Street	II	49, High Street			16 March 1970	TQ4155810101; 50°52′23″N 0°00′38″E		1353057	Upload Photo	Q26636014
50, High Street	II	50, High Street			29 October 1985	TQ4155210087; 50°52′23″N 0°00′38″E		1043827	Upload Photo	Q26295851
51 and 52, High Street	II	51 and 52, High Street			19 October 1984	TQ4154610085; 50°52′23″N 0°00′37″E		1191217	Upload Photo	Q26485956
53 and 54, High Street	II	53 and 54, High Street			25 February 1952	TQ4154010081; 50°52′22″N 0°00′37″E		1043828	Upload Photo	Q26295852
The White Hart Hotel	II	55, High Street			25 February 1952	TQ4153710048; 50°52′21″N 0°00′37″E		1191224	Upload Photo	Q26485964
57, High Street	II	57, High Street			29 October 1985	TQ4151410067; 50°52′22″N 0°00′36″E		1043829	Upload Photo	Q26295853
58, High Street	II	58, High Street			29 October 1985	TQ4150910063; 50°52′22″N 0°00′35″E		1191230	Upload Photo	Q26485970
60, High Street	II	60, High Street			29 October 1985	TQ4149210055; 50°52′22″N 0°00′35″E		1043830	Upload Photo	Q26295854
61, High Street	II	61, High Street			25 February 1952	TQ4148310049; 50°52′21″N 0°00′34″E		1293436	Upload Photo	Q26581373
62, High Street	II	62, High Street			25 February 1952	TQ4147410043; 50°52′21″N 0°00′34″E		1043831	Upload Photo	Q26295855
65, High Street	II	65, High Street, BN7 1AA			29 October 1985	TQ4145110032; 50°52′21″N 0°00′32″E		1043832	Upload Photo	Q26295857
66, High Street	II	66, High Street			25 February 1952	TQ4144410029; 50°52′21″N 0°00′32″E		1191251	Upload Photo	Q26485990
67, High Street	II	67, High Street			29 October 1985	TQ4143910027; 50°52′21″N 0°00′32″E		1043833	Upload Photo	Q26295858
70, 71, 72, High Street	II	70, 71, 72, High Street			16 March 1970	TQ4142210023; 50°52′21″N 0°00′31″E		1293416	Upload Photo	Q26581354
73, High Street	II	73, High Street			25 February 1952	TQ4141410020; 50°52′21″N 0°00′30″E		1043834	Upload Photo	Q26295859
74 and 75, High Street	II	74 and 75, High Street			25 February 1952	TQ4140310018; 50°52′21″N 0°00′30″E		1191281	Upload Photo	Q26486021
76, High Street	II	76, High Street			25 February 1952	TQ4139710012; 50°52′20″N 0°00′30″E		1043835	Upload Photo	Q26295860
77, High Street	II	77, High Street			29 October 1985	TQ4139210010; 50°52′20″N 0°00′29″E		1353058	Upload Photo	Q26636015
78, High Street	II	78, High Street			29 October 1985	TQ4138810008; 50°52′20″N 0°00′29″E		1191287	Upload Photo	Q26486027
79, High Street	II	79, High Street			29 October 1985	TQ4138310005; 50°52′20″N 0°00′29″E		1043836	Upload Photo	Q26295861
80 and 81, High Street	II	80 and 81, High Street			25 February 1952	TQ4137510001; 50°52′20″N 0°00′28″E		1293420	Upload Photo	Q26581358
St Swithun House	II*	82, High Street			25 February 1952	TQ4136209995; 50°52′20″N 0°00′28″E		1043837	Upload Photo	Q17555596
83/83a, High Street	II	83/83a, High Street			29 October 1985	TQ4135709985; 50°52′20″N 0°00′28″E		1191294	Upload Photo	Q26486034
86, High Street	II	86, High Street			29 October 1985	TQ4133309982; 50°52′19″N 0°00′26″E		1353059	Upload Photo	Q26636016
87, High Street	II	87, High Street			25 February 1952	TQ4132409980; 50°52′19″N 0°00′26″E		1191304	Upload Photo	Q26486043
88, High Street	II	88, High Street			29 October 1985	TQ4131709977; 50°52′19″N 0°00′25″E		1043838	Upload Photo	Q26295862
89 and 90, High Street	II	89 and 90, High Street			25 February 1952	TQ4131009976; 50°52′19″N 0°00′25″E		1353060	Upload Photo	Q26636017
Bull House	II*	92, High Street			25 February 1952	TQ4129009967; 50°52′19″N 0°00′24″E		1191309	Upload Photo	Q17555656
93, High Street	II	93, High Street			25 February 1952	TQ4127809968; 50°52′19″N 0°00′23″E		1191339	Upload Photo	Q26486076
94 and 95, High Street	II	94 and 95, High Street			16 March 1970	TQ4126809967; 50°52′19″N 0°00′23″E		1353061	Upload Photo	Q26636018
96 and 98, High Street	II	96 and 98, High Street			2 May 1980	TQ4125809965; 50°52′19″N 0°00′22″E		1191343	Upload Photo	Q26486080
99 and 100, High Street	II	99 and 100, High Street			25 February 1952	TQ4124309964; 50°52′19″N 0°00′22″E		1043840	Upload Photo	Q26295864
101, High Street	II	101, High Street			25 February 1952	TQ4123109965; 50°52′19″N 0°00′21″E		1191352	Upload Photo	Q26486089
102, High Street	II	102, High Street			25 February 1952	TQ4122409967; 50°52′19″N 0°00′21″E		1043841	Upload Photo	Q26295865
103, High Street	II	103, High Street			25 February 1952	TQ4121809968; 50°52′19″N 0°00′20″E		1353079	Upload Photo	Q26636036
Antioch House and Railings to North	II	104, High Street			25 February 1952	TQ4120209968; 50°52′19″N 0°00′20″E		1353080	Upload Photo	Q26636037
105, High Street	II	105, High Street			25 February 1952	TQ4119209980; 50°52′19″N 0°00′19″E		1043801	Upload Photo	Q26295824
106, High Street	II	106, High Street			25 February 1952	TQ4118509979; 50°52′19″N 0°00′19″E		1043802	Upload Photo	Q26295825
107, High Street	II	107, High Street			25 February 1952	TQ4117709979; 50°52′19″N 0°00′18″E		1353081	Upload Photo	Q26636038
108 and 109, High Street	II	108 and 109, High Street			16 March 1970	TQ4115809979; 50°52′19″N 0°00′17″E		1043803	Upload Photo	Q26295826
Trevor House	II	110, High Street			16 March 1970	TQ4113409971; 50°52′19″N 0°00′16″E		1353082	Upload Photo	Q26636039
114, High Street	II	114, High Street			25 February 1952	TQ4106909974; 50°52′19″N 0°00′13″E		1191403	Upload Photo	Q26486135
115, High Street	II	115, High Street			25 February 1952	TQ4106209975; 50°52′19″N 0°00′12″E		1043805	Upload Photo	Q26295827
116, High Street	II	116, High Street			25 February 1952	TQ4105609975; 50°52′19″N 0°00′12″E		1191408	Upload Photo	Q26486139
117, High Street	II	117, High Street			25 February 1952	TQ4105009975; 50°52′19″N 0°00′12″E		1043806	Upload Photo	Q26295828
Hill Lodge	II	118, High Street			25 February 1952	TQ4104209975; 50°52′19″N 0°00′11″E		1353045	Upload Photo	Q26636004
Ashdown House	II	119, High Street			25 February 1952	TQ4102909977; 50°52′20″N 0°00′11″E		1191418	Upload Photo	Q26486147
120 and 121, High Street	II	120 and 121, High Street			25 February 1952	TQ4101709980; 50°52′20″N 0°00′10″E		1043807	Upload Photo	Q26295829
122 and 123, High Street	II	122 and 123, High Street			25 February 1952	TQ4100209983; 50°52′20″N 0°00′09″E		1191425	Upload Photo	Q26486154
124, 125, 126, High Street	II	124, 125, 126, High Street			25 February 1952	TQ4098909987; 50°52′20″N 0°00′09″E		1353046	Upload Photo	Q26636005
127, High Street	II	127, High Street			29 October 1985	TQ4101610006; 50°52′20″N 0°00′10″E		1043808	Upload Photo	Q26295830
128, High Street	II	128, High Street			29 October 1985	TQ4102310004; 50°52′20″N 0°00′10″E		1191436	Upload Photo	Q26486163
134, High Street	II	134, High Street			25 February 1952	TQ4106309998; 50°52′20″N 0°00′12″E		1043809	Upload Photo	Q26295831
135 and 136, High Street	II	135 and 136, High Street			25 February 1952	TQ4107309997; 50°52′20″N 0°00′13″E		1043810	Upload Photo	Q26295832
138, High Street	II	138, High Street			16 March 1970	TQ4116310002; 50°52′20″N 0°00′18″E		1287073	Upload Photo	Q26575602
139, High Street	II	139, High Street			16 March 1970	TQ4117510000; 50°52′20″N 0°00′18″E		1043812	Upload Photo	Q26295834
Tyne House and Railings to South	II*	140, High Street			25 February 1952	TQ4118809999; 50°52′20″N 0°00′19″E		1191493	Upload Photo	Q17555666
No 141 and Railings to South	II	141, High Street			25 February 1952	TQ4119709998; 50°52′20″N 0°00′19″E		1043813	Upload Photo	Q26295836
The Corner House and Railings to South	II	142, High Street			25 February 1952	TQ4120809997; 50°52′20″N 0°00′20″E		1043814	Upload Photo	Q26295837
144, High Street	II	144, High Street			29 October 1985	TQ4124009986; 50°52′20″N 0°00′22″E		1191507	Upload Photo	Q26486230
146, High Street	II	146, High Street			25 February 1952	TQ4126809982; 50°52′19″N 0°00′23″E		1353047	Upload Photo	Q26636006
Freemason's Hall	II	148, High Street			25 February 1952	TQ4127409983; 50°52′20″N 0°00′23″E		1191537	Upload Photo	Q26486260
151, High Street	II	151, High Street			29 October 1985	TQ4128209984; 50°52′20″N 0°00′24″E		1353048	Upload Photo	Q26636007
152, 153, 155, High Street	II	152, 153, 155, High Street			29 October 1985	TQ4128909987; 50°52′20″N 0°00′24″E		1191546	Upload Photo	Q26486269
159 and 160, High Street	II	159 and 160, High Street			16 March 1970	TQ4134510010; 50°52′20″N 0°00′27″E		1353050	Upload Photo	Q26636009
161 and 162, High Street	II	161 and 162, High Street			29 October 1985	TQ4135310014; 50°52′20″N 0°00′27″E		1191588	Upload Photo	Q26486303
163 and 164, High Street	II	163 and 164, High Street			25 February 1952	TQ4136410019; 50°52′21″N 0°00′28″E		1043817	Upload Photo	Q26295840
The Old Forge	II	163a, High Street			29 October 1985	TQ4135610030; 50°52′21″N 0°00′28″E		1191591	Upload Photo	Q26486306
Castle Place	II*	166, High Street			25 February 1952	TQ4137810026; 50°52′21″N 0°00′29″E		1353051	Upload Photo	Q17555856
168, High Street	II	168, High Street			25 February 1952	TQ4139010032; 50°52′21″N 0°00′29″E		1191623	Upload Photo	Q26486337
Barbican House	II*	169, High Street			25 February 1952	TQ4140710042; 50°52′21″N 0°00′30″E		1043818	Upload Photo	Q17555587
171 and 172, High Street	II	171 and 172, High Street			29 October 1985	TQ4142810051; 50°52′22″N 0°00′31″E		1191626	Upload Photo	Q26486340
174, High Street	II	174, High Street			25 February 1952	TQ4144710058; 50°52′22″N 0°00′32″E		1043819	Upload Photo	Q26295842
Morby House	II	175, High Street			25 February 1952	TQ4145110059; 50°52′22″N 0°00′32″E		1353068	Upload Photo	Q26636025
177, High Street	II	177, High Street			29 October 1985	TQ4146410067; 50°52′22″N 0°00′33″E		1353069	Upload Photo	Q26636026
178, High Street	II	178, High Street			29 October 1985	TQ4147110070; 50°52′22″N 0°00′33″E		1353070	Upload Photo	Q26636027
186, High Street	II	186, High Street			25 February 1952	TQ4153510115; 50°52′24″N 0°00′37″E		1353071	Upload Photo	Q26636028
187 and 188, High Street	II	187 and 188, High Street			16 March 1970	TQ4154910121; 50°52′24″N 0°00′38″E		1043781	Upload Photo	Q26295804
Old Bank House and Railings to South	II	190, High Street			25 February 1952	TQ4157310140; 50°52′24″N 0°00′39″E		1043782	Upload Photo	Q26295805
191, High Street	II	191, High Street			29 October 1985	TQ4158310151; 50°52′25″N 0°00′39″E		1043783	Upload Photo	Q26295806
192, 193, 194, High Street	II	192, 193, 194, High Street			29 October 1985	TQ4160610154; 50°52′25″N 0°00′40″E		1043784	Upload Photo	Q26295807
195, High Street	II	195, High Street			29 October 1985	TQ4161710159; 50°52′25″N 0°00′41″E		1353074	Upload Photo	Q26636031
196, High Street	II	196, High Street			29 October 1985	TQ4162210161; 50°52′25″N 0°00′41″E		1191743	Upload Photo	Q26486447
197 and 197a, High Street	II	197 and 197a, High Street, BN7 2NS			29 October 1985	TQ4162910163; 50°52′25″N 0°00′42″E		1043785	Upload Photo	Q26295808
198 and 198a, High Street	II	198 and 198a, High Street			25 February 1952	TQ4163710166; 50°52′25″N 0°00′42″E		1191760	Upload Photo	Q26486464
Preston House	II	200, High Street			25 February 1952	TQ4164710169; 50°52′25″N 0°00′43″E		1043786	Upload Photo	Q26295809
201 and 202, High Street	II	201 and 202, High Street			19 July 1985	TQ4166210175; 50°52′25″N 0°00′43″E		1191766	Upload Photo	Q26486470
No 203 and Railings to South	II	203, High Street			16 March 1970	TQ4167210180; 50°52′26″N 0°00′44″E		1043787	Upload Photo	Q26295810
204, High Street	II	204, High Street			29 October 1985	TQ4167710182; 50°52′26″N 0°00′44″E		1191769	Upload Photo	Q26486474
205 and 206, High Street	II	205 and 206, High Street			29 October 1985	TQ4168310185; 50°52′26″N 0°00′44″E		1043788	Upload Photo	Q26295811
207, High Street	II	207, High Street			29 October 1985	TQ4169110191; 50°52′26″N 0°00′45″E		1191828	Upload Photo	Q26486530
No 208 and Railings to South	II	208, High Street			25 February 1952	TQ4169910195; 50°52′26″N 0°00′45″E		1043789	Upload Photo	Q26295812
209, High Street	II	209, High Street			29 October 1985	TQ4170710197; 50°52′26″N 0°00′46″E		1043790	Upload Photo	Q26295813
210, High Street	II	210, High Street			16 March 1970	TQ4174810214; 50°52′27″N 0°00′48″E		1286902	Upload Photo	Q26575449
No 211 and Railings to South	II	211, High Street			25 February 1952	TQ4175710215; 50°52′27″N 0°00′48″E		1043791	Upload Photo	Q26295814
No 212 and Railings to South	II	212, High Street			25 February 1952	TQ4176810217; 50°52′27″N 0°00′49″E		1286867	Upload Photo	Q26575417
No 213 Railings And Wall To East	II	213, High Street			25 February 1952	TQ4178810225; 50°52′27″N 0°00′50″E		1043792	Upload Photo	Q26295815
214, High Street	II	214, High Street			29 October 1985	TQ4180810227; 50°52′27″N 0°00′51″E		1191851	Upload Photo	Q26486554
220 and 221, High Street	II	220 and 221, High Street			25 February 1952	TQ4189210239; 50°52′27″N 0°00′55″E		1043793	Upload Photo	Q26295816
224, High Street	II	224, High Street			7 June 1971	TQ4192410241; 50°52′27″N 0°00′57″E		1286874	Upload Photo	Q26575423
War Memorial	II*	Junction Of The High Street And Market Street			29 October 1985	TQ4159610140; 50°52′24″N 0°00′40″E		1191738	Upload Photo	Q22115515
Gazebo in the Garden of Nos 15 and 16 (the Caprons)	II	Keere Street			25 February 1952	TQ4131609862; 50°52′16″N 0°00′25″E		1353077	Upload Photo	Q26636034
Lamp Standard 5 Metres to West of the Caprons	II	Keere Street			17 May 2000	TQ4129809842; 50°52′15″N 0°00′24″E		1380330	Upload Photo	Q26660537
Remains of the Town Walls Behind Nos 11-16 (inclusive)	II	Keere Street			16 March 1970	TQ4130509892; 50°52′17″N 0°00′25″E		1043797	Upload Photo	Q26295820
1, Keere Street	II	1, Keere Street			25 February 1952	TQ4125909955; 50°52′19″N 0°00′22″E		1353075	Upload Photo	Q26636032
St Michaels's Court	II	1 and 2, Keere Street			16 March 1970	TQ4128309917; 50°52′17″N 0°00′24″E		1191886	Upload Photo	Q26486585
2 and 3, Keere Street	II	2 and 3, Keere Street			16 March 1970	TQ4126209947; 50°52′18″N 0°00′23″E		1043794	Upload Photo	Q26295817
4 and 5, Keere Street	II	4 and 5, Keere Street			16 March 1970	TQ4126409941; 50°52′18″N 0°00′23″E		1191875	Upload Photo	Q26486577
7, Keere Street	II	7, Keere Street			16 March 1970	TQ4126709933; 50°52′18″N 0°00′23″E		1353076	Upload Photo	Q26636033
8 and 9, Keere Street	II	8 and 9, Keere Street			16 March 1970	TQ4126809927; 50°52′18″N 0°00′23″E		1286882	Upload Photo	Q26575430
10, Keere Street	II	10, Keere Street			25 February 1952	TQ4127309921; 50°52′18″N 0°00′23″E		1043795	Upload Photo	Q26295818
11, Keere Street	II	11, Keere Street			30 June 1988	TQ4127609903; 50°52′17″N 0°00′23″E		1043693	Upload Photo	Q26295704
12, Keere Street	II	12, Keere Street			30 June 1988	TQ4127909897; 50°52′17″N 0°00′23″E		1374930	Upload Photo	Q26655757
13, Keere Street	II	13, Keere Street			29 October 1985	TQ4128309891; 50°52′17″N 0°00′24″E		1043796	Upload Photo	Q26295819
The Caprons and Railings to West	II*	15 and 16, Keere Street			25 February 1952	TQ4130609857; 50°52′15″N 0°00′25″E		1286853	Upload Photo	Q17555816
19, Keere Street	II	19, Keere Street			16 March 1970	TQ4125809922; 50°52′18″N 0°00′22″E		1286856	Upload Photo	Q26575407
21, Keere Street	II	21, Keere Street			25 February 1952	TQ4125509928; 50°52′18″N 0°00′22″E		1353078	Upload Photo	Q26636035
22 and 23, Keere Street	II	22 and 23, Keere Street			16 March 1970	TQ4125309935; 50°52′18″N 0°00′22″E		1191924	Upload Photo	Q26486625
24, Keere Street	II	24, Keere Street			16 March 1970	TQ4125109940; 50°52′18″N 0°00′22″E		1043798	Upload Photo	Q26295821
25 and 26, Keere Street	II	25 and 26, Keere Street			25 February 1952	TQ4124909947; 50°52′18″N 0°00′22″E		1286826	Upload Photo	Q26575381
Walls of Old Naval Prison	II	Lancaster Street			29 October 1985	TQ4157610370; 50°52′32″N 0°00′39″E		1043758	Upload Photo	Q26295780
7 and 9, Lancaster Street	II	7 and 9, Lancaster Street			8 June 1983	TQ4162310414; 50°52′33″N 0°00′42″E		1353097	Upload Photo	Q26636053
2, Lansdown Place	II	2, Lansdown Place			9 August 1985	TQ4172309999; 50°52′20″N 0°00′46″E		1353098	Upload Photo	Q26636054
12-14 and 16, Lansdown Place	II	12-14 and 16, Lansdown Place, BN7 2JT			30 June 1988	TQ4168209988; 50°52′19″N 0°00′44″E		1043759	Upload Photo	Q26295781
15, Lansdown Place	II	15, Lansdown Place			16 March 1970	TQ4167609965; 50°52′19″N 0°00′44″E		1043760	Upload Photo	Q26295782
17-25, Lansdown Place	II	17-25, Lansdown Place			16 March 1970	TQ4166809964; 50°52′19″N 0°00′43″E		1353101	Upload Photo	Q26636057
18, Lansdown Place	II	18, Lansdown Place			29 October 1985	TQ4167809986; 50°52′19″N 0°00′44″E		1353099	Upload Photo	Q26636055
20-34, Lansdown Place	II	20-34, Lansdown Place, BN7 2JU			16 March 1970	TQ4164809977; 50°52′19″N 0°00′42″E		1353100	Upload Photo	Q26636056
27, Lansdown Place	II	27, Lansdown Place			29 October 1985	TQ4165209960; 50°52′18″N 0°00′43″E		1043761	Upload Photo	Q26295784
27 Keere Street, Lewes East	II	27 Keere Street, Lewes East, BN7 1TY			25 February 1952	TQ4124609961; 50°52′19″N 0°00′22″E		1043799	Upload Photo	Q26295822
1 and 2, Little East Street	II	1 and 2, Little East Street			29 October 1985	TQ4173210331; 50°52′30″N 0°00′47″E		1043762	Upload Photo	Q26295785
4 and 5, Little East Street	II	4 and 5, Little East Street			29 October 1985	TQ4172510329; 50°52′30″N 0°00′47″E		1353102	Upload Photo	Q26636058
6, Little East Street	II	6, Little East Street			29 October 1985	TQ4171810326; 50°52′30″N 0°00′46″E		1191980	Upload Photo	Q26486677
8, 9, 10, 11, 12, Little East Street	II	8, 9, 10, 11, 12, Little East Street			29 October 1985	TQ4166710339; 50°52′31″N 0°00′44″E		1043763	Upload Photo	Q26295786
13 and 14, Little East Street	II	13 and 14, Little East Street			29 October 1985	TQ4168710345; 50°52′31″N 0°00′45″E		1286816	Upload Photo	Q26575373
1 and 2, Market Street	II	1 and 2, Market Street			29 October 1985	TQ4159710178; 50°52′26″N 0°00′40″E		1043773	Upload Photo	Q26295797
4, Market Street	II	4, Market Street			25 February 1952	TQ4160110193; 50°52′26″N 0°00′40″E		1192108	Upload Photo	Q26486796
6, Market Street	II	6, Market Street			25 February 1952	TQ4160610206; 50°52′26″N 0°00′41″E		1353065	Upload Photo	Q26636022
7, Market Street	II	7, Market Street			29 October 1985	TQ4160710211; 50°52′27″N 0°00′41″E		1192117	Upload Photo	Q26486805
8, Market Street	II	8, Market Street			29 October 1985	TQ4160810215; 50°52′27″N 0°00′41″E		1043774	Upload Photo	Q26295798
9, 10 and 11, Market Street	II	9, 10 and 11, Market Street, BN7 2NB			25 February 1952	TQ4160610222; 50°52′27″N 0°00′41″E		1043775	Upload Photo	Q26295799
18-20, Market Street	II	18-20, Market Street			29 October 1985	TQ4161110177; 50°52′26″N 0°00′41″E		1286759	Upload Photo	Q26575322
The Lewes Arms Public House	II	Mount Place			29 October 1985	TQ4147510212; 50°52′27″N 0°00′34″E		1353066	Upload Photo	Q26636023
2, Mount Place	II	2, Mount Place			29 October 1985	TQ4147910233; 50°52′27″N 0°00′34″E		1286763	Upload Photo	Q26575325
1 and 2, Mount Pleasant	II	1 and 2, Mount Pleasant			29 October 1985	TQ4144410298; 50°52′30″N 0°00′32″E		1043776	Upload Photo	Q26295800
3, Mount Pleasant	II	3, Mount Pleasant			29 October 1985	TQ4145110295; 50°52′29″N 0°00′33″E		1286725	Upload Photo	Q26575291
4, Mount Pleasant	II	4, Mount Pleasant			29 October 1985	TQ4145610293; 50°52′29″N 0°00′33″E		1353067	Upload Photo	Q26636024
5, 6, 7, 8 and 9, Mount Pleasant	II	5, 6, 7, 8 and 9, Mount Pleasant, BN7 2DH			26 July 1976	TQ4146810286; 50°52′29″N 0°00′34″E		1192167	Upload Photo	Q26486851
10, 11, 12, 13, 14, Mount Pleasant	II	10, 11, 12, 13, 14, Mount Pleasant			29 October 1985	TQ4145910266; 50°52′29″N 0°00′33″E		1043777	Upload Photo	Q26295801
1-11, New Road	II	1-11, New Road			29 October 1985	TQ4139410259; 50°52′28″N 0°00′30″E		1043778	Upload Photo	Q26295802
1, North Street	II	1, North Street			25 February 1952	TQ4160310247; 50°52′28″N 0°00′40″E		1192173	Upload Photo	Q26486857
2, North Street	II	2, North Street			29 October 1985	TQ4160410250; 50°52′28″N 0°00′41″E		1353087	Upload Photo	Q26636044
3 and 4, North Street	II	3 and 4, North Street			29 October 1985	TQ4160110256; 50°52′28″N 0°00′40″E		1043738	Upload Photo	Q26295759
5, North Street	II	5, North Street			29 October 1985	TQ4160410269; 50°52′28″N 0°00′41″E		1043739	Upload Photo	Q26295760
69, North Street	II	69, North Street			25 February 1952	TQ4163410256; 50°52′28″N 0°00′42″E		1353088	Upload Photo	Q26636045
70, North Street	II	70, North Street			29 October 1985	TQ4163510251; 50°52′28″N 0°00′42″E		1043740	Upload Photo	Q26295761
No 71 and Railings to West	II	71, North Street			29 October 1985	TQ4163310247; 50°52′28″N 0°00′42″E		1353089	Upload Photo	Q26636046
72, North Street	II	72, North Street			29 October 1985	TQ4163310242; 50°52′28″N 0°00′42″E		1043741	Upload Photo	Q26295762
No 73 and Railings to West	II	73, North Street			21 May 1985	TQ4163110239; 50°52′27″N 0°00′42″E		1043742	Upload Photo	Q26295763
Walls on East and West Sides of Paine's Twittern	II	Paine's Twittern			29 October 1985	TQ4135209913; 50°52′17″N 0°00′27″E		1353090	Upload Photo	Q26636047
The Round House	II	Pipe Passage			29 October 1985	TQ4126210060; 50°52′22″N 0°00′23″E		1043743	Upload Photo	Q26295764
1, 2 and 3, Pipe Passage	II	1, 2 and 3, Pipe Passage			30 June 1988	TQ4127210041; 50°52′21″N 0°00′23″E		1043694	Upload Photo	Q26295706
Former Stables to Antioch House (104 High Street)	II	Rotten Row			25 February 1952	TQ4118009966; 50°52′19″N 0°00′18″E		1192250	Upload Photo	Q26486925
Pelham House	II*	St Andrew's Lane, BN7 1UW			25 February 1952	TQ4147810005; 50°52′20″N 0°00′34″E		1043747	Upload Photo	Q17555569
41, St John's Street	II	41, St John's Street			29 October 1985	TQ4152310310; 50°52′30″N 0°00′36″E		1192268	Upload Photo	Q26486942
1, St Martin's Lane	II	1, St Martin's Lane			29 October 1985	TQ4141810012; 50°52′20″N 0°00′31″E		1043749	Upload Photo	Q26295770
2, St Martin's Lane	II	2, St Martin's Lane			29 October 1985	TQ4142110006; 50°52′20″N 0°00′31″E		1192272	Upload Photo	Q26486946
4 and 5, St Martin's Lane	II	4 and 5, St Martin's Lane			29 October 1985	TQ4143609972; 50°52′19″N 0°00′32″E		1043750	Upload Photo	Q26295771
6, St Martin's Lane	II	6, St Martin's Lane			29 October 1985	TQ4143909969; 50°52′19″N 0°00′32″E		1192273	Upload Photo	Q26486947
12, St Martin's Lane	II	12, St Martin's Lane			29 October 1985	TQ4140910005; 50°52′20″N 0°00′30″E		1043751	Upload Photo	Q26295772
Rose Cottage	II	11, St Nicholas Lane			29 October 1985	TQ4166810012; 50°52′20″N 0°00′43″E		1353093	Upload Photo	Q26636050
The Royal Oak Public House	II	Station Street			29 October 1985	TQ4157410079; 50°52′22″N 0°00′39″E		1192996	Upload Photo	Q26487662
1, Station Street	II	1, Station Street			29 October 1985	TQ4156510094; 50°52′23″N 0°00′38″E		1192985	Upload Photo	Q26487653
2, Station Street	II	2, Station Street			29 October 1985	TQ4156810089; 50°52′23″N 0°00′38″E		1043704	Upload Photo	Q26295718
16, Station Street	II	16, Station Street			29 October 1985	TQ4158609974; 50°52′19″N 0°00′39″E		1374936	Upload Photo	Q26655763
19, 20, 21, Station Street	II	19, 20, 21, Station Street			29 October 1985	TQ4159510004; 50°52′20″N 0°00′40″E		1043705	Upload Photo	Q26295719
26, Station Street	II	26, Station Street			29 October 1985	TQ4158010032; 50°52′21″N 0°00′39″E		1193009	Upload Photo	Q26487674
26a, Station Street	II	26a, Station Street			29 October 1985	TQ4156910029; 50°52′21″N 0°00′38″E		1043706	Upload Photo	Q26295720
27 and 28, Station Street	II	27 and 28, Station Street			29 October 1985	TQ4157310049; 50°52′21″N 0°00′39″E		1286336	Upload Photo	Q26574943
2, Sun Street	II	2, Sun Street			29 October 1985	TQ4151310381; 50°52′32″N 0°00′36″E		1193063	Upload Photo	Q26487726
3 and 5, Sun Street	II	3 and 5, Sun Street			29 October 1985	TQ4149510371; 50°52′32″N 0°00′35″E		1043707	Upload Photo	Q26295721
4 and 6, Sun Street	II	4 and 6, Sun Street			29 October 1985	TQ4151210377; 50°52′32″N 0°00′36″E		1374939	Upload Photo	Q26655766
7 and 9, Sun Street	II	7 and 9, Sun Street			29 October 1985	TQ4149310366; 50°52′32″N 0°00′35″E		1193020	Upload Photo	Q26487682
8 and 10, Sun Street	II	8 and 10, Sun Street			29 October 1985	TQ4151110365; 50°52′32″N 0°00′36″E		1043712	Upload Photo	Q26295728
11 and 13, Sun Street	II	11 and 13, Sun Street			29 October 1985	TQ4149110360; 50°52′32″N 0°00′35″E		1043708	Upload Photo	Q26295723
12, Sun Street	II	12, Sun Street			29 October 1985	TQ4151110362; 50°52′32″N 0°00′36″E		1193080	Upload Photo	Q26487744
14 and 16, Sun Street	II	14 and 16, Sun Street			29 October 1985	TQ4151010358; 50°52′31″N 0°00′36″E		1374940	Upload Photo	Q26655767
15 and 17, Sun Street	II	15 and 17, Sun Street			29 October 1985	TQ4149010353; 50°52′31″N 0°00′35″E		1286343	Upload Photo	Q26574950
18, Sun Street	II	18, Sun Street			29 October 1985	TQ4150910349; 50°52′31″N 0°00′36″E		1286292	Upload Photo	Q26574904
19, Sun Street	II	19, Sun Street			25 February 1952	TQ4148710344; 50°52′31″N 0°00′35″E		1374937	Upload Photo	Q26655764
20, Sun Street	II	20, Sun Street			29 October 1985	TQ4150710344; 50°52′31″N 0°00′36″E		1043713	Upload Photo	Q26295729
21, Sun Street	II	21, Sun Street			29 October 1985	TQ4148610338; 50°52′31″N 0°00′35″E		1043709	Upload Photo	Q26295724
22, Sun Street	II	22, Sun Street			29 October 1985	TQ4150710340; 50°52′31″N 0°00′36″E		1193094	Upload Photo	Q26487755
23 and 25, Sun Street	II	23 and 25, Sun Street			29 October 1985	TQ4148210325; 50°52′30″N 0°00′34″E		1286347	Upload Photo	Q26574954
24 and 26, Sun Street	II	24 and 26, Sun Street			29 October 1985	TQ4150510337; 50°52′31″N 0°00′36″E		1043714	Upload Photo	Q26295730
27 and 29, Sun Street	II	27 and 29, Sun Street			25 February 1952	TQ4148110320; 50°52′30″N 0°00′34″E		1043710	Upload Photo	Q26295725
28 and 30, Sun Street	II	28 and 30, Sun Street			29 October 1985	TQ4150310330; 50°52′31″N 0°00′35″E		1374941	Upload Photo	Q26655768
31 and 33, Sun Street	II	31 and 33, Sun Street			29 October 1985	TQ4148010310; 50°52′30″N 0°00′34″E		1193044	Upload Photo	Q26487706
32 and 34, Sun Street	II	32 and 34, Sun Street			29 October 1985	TQ4150210324; 50°52′30″N 0°00′35″E		1193100	Upload Photo	Q26487760
35 and 37, Sun Street	II	35 and 37, Sun Street			29 October 1985	TQ4147810303; 50°52′30″N 0°00′34″E		1374938	Upload Photo	Q26655765
36 and 38, Sun Street	II	36 and 38, Sun Street			29 October 1985	TQ4150110312; 50°52′30″N 0°00′35″E		1043715	Upload Photo	Q26295732
39 and 41, Sun Street	II	39 and 41, Sun Street			29 October 1985	TQ4147610296; 50°52′29″N 0°00′34″E		1193057	Upload Photo	Q26487719
40 and 42, Sun Street	II	40 and 42, Sun Street			29 October 1985	TQ4150110309; 50°52′30″N 0°00′35″E		1193107	Upload Photo	Q26487767
43, Sun Street	II	43, Sun Street			26 July 1976	TQ4147710286; 50°52′29″N 0°00′34″E		1043711	Upload Photo	Q26295727
44 and 46, Sun Street	II	44 and 46, Sun Street			29 October 1985	TQ4149410301; 50°52′30″N 0°00′35″E		1353118	Upload Photo	Q26636069
Lewes New School (former Pells County Primary School)	II	Talbot Terrace			23 December 1999	TQ4141010491; 50°52′36″N 0°00′31″E		1379949	Upload Photo	Q26660166
Mounting Block;The Croft (adjacent To County Hall)	II	High Street			22 February 2006	TQ4099309942; 50°52′18″N 0°00′09″E		1391834	Upload Photo	Q26671177
The Former Motor House; The Croft (adjacent To County Hall)	II	High Street			22 February 2006	TQ4102009962; 50°52′19″N 0°00′10″E		1391833	Upload Photo	Q26671176
Former Stables to School Hill House	II	Walwer's Lane			25 February 1952	TQ4164610084; 50°52′22″N 0°00′42″E		1043681	Upload Photo	Q26295689
Wall to Garden of School Hill House	II	Walwer's Lane			29 October 1985	TQ4164310112; 50°52′23″N 0°00′42″E		1353119	Upload Photo	Q26636070
Wall to West of Pelham House	II	Watergate Lane			29 October 1985	TQ4148909954; 50°52′18″N 0°00′34″E		1043682	Upload Photo	Q26295690
1-9, Waterloo Place	II	1-9, Waterloo Place			16 March 1970	TQ4174010358; 50°52′31″N 0°00′48″E		1043683	Upload Photo	Q26295691
13, Waterloo Place	II	13, Waterloo Place			25 February 1952	TQ4170510383; 50°52′32″N 0°00′46″E		1043684	Upload Photo	Q26295694
7 and 9, West Street	II	7 and 9, West Street			29 October 1985	TQ4158010253; 50°52′28″N 0°00′39″E		1193322	Upload Photo	Q26487973
Boys Chest Tomb 5 Yards North of Church of St Anne	II	Western Road			29 October 1985	TQ4092810019; 50°52′21″N 0°00′06″E		1286281	Upload Photo	Q26574894
Church of St Anne	I	Western Road			25 February 1952	TQ4093510005; 50°52′21″N 0°00′06″E		1043687	Upload Photo	Q17534649
Headstone 12 Yards South of Church of St Anne	II	Western Road			29 October 1985	TQ4095009987; 50°52′20″N 0°00′07″E		1043690	Upload Photo	Q26295701
Headstone 25 Yards East of Church of St Anne	II	Western Road			29 October 1985	TQ4097009996; 50°52′20″N 0°00′08″E		1286222	Upload Photo	Q26574843
Hillman Tomb 15 Yards South of Church of St Anne	II	Western Road			29 October 1985	TQ4091409994; 50°52′20″N 0°00′05″E		1193311	Upload Photo	Q26487961
Molineux Chest Tomb 10 Yards South of Church of St Anne	II	Western Road			29 October 1985	TQ4094509987; 50°52′20″N 0°00′06″E		1353120	Upload Photo	Q26636071
Row of Cast Iron Monuments to Medhurst Family 15 Yards North East of Church of St Anne	II	Western Road			29 October 1985	TQ4091610029; 50°52′21″N 0°00′05″E		1043688	Upload Photo	Q26295698
The Black Horse Hotel	II	Western Road			29 October 1985	TQ4081910082; 50°52′23″N 0°00′00″E		1043685	Upload Photo	Q26295695
Tomb 15 Yards North of Church of St Anne	II	Western Road			29 October 1985	TQ4091810027; 50°52′21″N 0°00′05″E		1043689	Upload Photo	Q26295699
Wall to North and East of Church of St Anne	II	Western Road			16 March 1970	TQ4094710015; 50°52′21″N 0°00′07″E		1366118	Upload Photo	Q26647747
13, Western Road	II	13, Western Road			29 October 1985	TQ4092210042; 50°52′22″N 0°00′05″E		1043686	Upload Photo	Q26295696
Remains of Town Walls	II	Westgate Street			16 March 1970	TQ4126310023; 50°52′21″N 0°00′23″E		1353121	Upload Photo	Q26636072

== See also ==
- Grade I listed buildings in East Sussex
- Grade II* listed buildings in East Sussex

== Sources ==
- Antram, Nicholas; Pevsner, Nikolaus (2012) [1965], Sussex: East, The Buildings of England, New Haven and London: Yale University Press, ISBN 978-0-300-18473-0
