= Harold Scott (pathologist) =

British pathologist

Sir Harold Scott KCMG FRSE FRCP FZS

Director, Bureau of Hygiene and Tropical Diseases
- In office 1935–1942

Personal details
- Born: Henry Harold Scott; 3 August 1874 Spalding, Lincolnshire, England
- Died: 6 August 1956 (aged 82) Braintree, Essex, England
- Occupation: Pathologist, bacteriologist

Sir Henry Harold Scott (3 August 1874 – 6 August 1956) was a 20th century British pathologist, bacteriologist and medical author. He was President of the Royal Society of Tropical Medicine and Hygiene 1943-1945.

== Life ==
He was born on 3 August 1874 in Spalding the son of Rev Douglas Lee Scott LLD, later headmaster of Mercers' School, and his wife Mary Elizabeth Rogers. He was educated at the Mercers' School. He then trained at St. Thomas' Hospital and St. Bartholomew's Hospital, London.

He served in the Second Boer War from 1902 in the South African Field Force, receiving the Queen's Medal with five clasps. Returning to England he served as a GP in Ludlow. In 1910 he received a government appointment of state pathologist to Jamaica and lived there for 4 years.

He served as a pathologist for the RAMC in the First World War based at the Cambridge Hospital in Aldershot.

In 1917 he was elected a Fellow of the Royal Society of Edinburgh. His proposers were Henry Richard Kenwood, Daniel Elie Anderson, David Ellis and John Miller.

In 1922 he took another government appointment as pathologist and bacteriologist in Hong Kong. However, he grew ill there and had to return home. He then found an appointment as pathologist at the Zoological Society of London. In 1928 he became Medical Secretary to the Colonial Medical Research Council in London. In 1930 he became Assistant Director of the Bureau of Hygiene and Tropical Medicine.

In 1935 he was created a Companion of the Order of St. Michael and St. George (CMG) and in 1941 was created a Knight of the Order (KCMG).

He retired in 1942, and died in Braintree on 6 August 1956.

== Family ==
He married twice: firstly in 1899 to Harriette Preston (24 January 1873 - 25 January 1933) of Attleborough, Norfolk, who is buried in Highgate Cemetery (east). Following her death, on 1 May 1934 he married Eileen Anne Prichard (20 June 1883 - 1971) of Wilburton, Cambridgeshire.

== Publications ==
- Some Notable Epidemics (1934)
- A History of Tropical Medicine (1939)
