= Nils Norman =

British artist

== Life and career ==
=== Early life ===
Norman was born in Sevenoaks, Kent, England in 1966 and lived there until 1979. In 1979 his parents moved to Bexhill, East Sussex. He attended Bexhill High School, Bexhill Sixth Form College and he did his Art Foundation at Hastings College of Arts and Technology.

=== Public works ===
Norman has completed major public art projects, including a pedestrian bridge, small playgrounds and a landscaping project for the City of Roskilde.

In 2007, his work was on show at Tate Modern in the Global Cities exhibition, his presentation featured a series of posters displaying ecological and environmental information. In her 2006 survey Beyond Green, Stephanie Smith highlighted Norman's interest in the apparent homogenization of urban spaces resultant from regeneration projects. It has been claimed that "Norman’s work has been compared to the urban projects of artists such as Claes Oldenburg, Robert Smithson, Gordon Matta-Clark, and Krzysztof Wodiczko.". He has been a regular contributor to Mute magazine.

Norman takes inspiration from the work of anarchist theorist Colin Ward, going as far as experimenting with Ward's 1973 book "Streetwork". Norman has also referenced the efforts of Cedric Price, especially those set forth in Price's "Non-Plan".

In 2010 Norman developed two small-scale urban farming parks in the Hague, the Netherlands, that test and question the limitations and potentialities of permaculture as a possible citywide alternative design strategy for urban centres They are an ongoing project and can be visited by the public. He has worked closely with the local community of Mereside to develop ideas for two new play areas. In 2015 the St Fagans National History Museum, Cardiff, Wales commissioned Norman to develop a new playground for the museum that reflects its collection of Welsh historical artefacts. The playground will be completed in Spring 2017.

In collaboration with the artist Gareth Jones, Norman has been researching and designing a new public art strategy called City Club for the area around the Milton Keynes Gallery in Milton Keynes. Norman has also been collaborating with the Welsh artist Owen Griffiths on a public realm project in Trebanog, Wales. Working closely with children and parents locally to develop designs for their public spaces, commissioned by Artis Mundi. In 2017 he will complete a new library design for the Rietveld Art Academy Amsterdam.
