= St Richard's Catholic College =

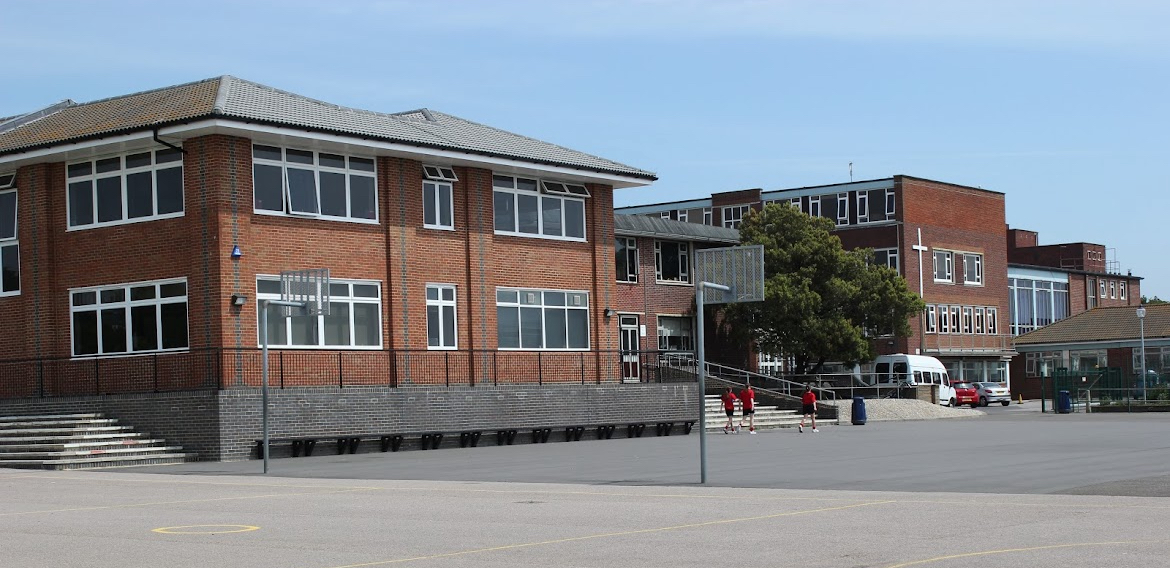
- Main school building

Location
- Ashdown Road; Bexhill-on-Sea, East Sussex TN40 1SE

Information
- Former name: St Richard's Roman Catholic School
- School type: Academy Secondary
- Motto: Comitas, Scientia, Caritas (Community, Knowledge, Charity)
- Religious affiliation: Roman Catholic
- Patron saint: St Richard of Chichester
- Established: c1958
- Local authority: East Sussex
- Department for Education URN: 151779 Tables
- Ofsted: Reports
- Principal: Paul Barber
- Chaplain: Jo Doyle
- Staff: approx. 130
- Gender: Coeducational
- Age: 11 to 16
- Enrolment: approx. 1040
- Houses: Gwyn, Rigby, Howard, Wells
- Colours: St Richard’s Grey, Black
- Publication: Newsletter
- Website: strichardscc.com

St Richard's Catholic College, or St. Richard's, is a coeducational secondary school in East Sussex, United Kingdom. It is an academy, part of The Bosco Catholic Education Trust, with the original school founded in 1959 and maintained by East Sussex County Council and caters for children aged 11–16. The school is situated in the Roman Catholic Diocese of Arundel and Brighton.

== History and academy status ==
The school was originally established as a voluntary aided school before officially joining the Bosco Catholic Education Trust as an academy on 1 October 2025.

== Reports and inspections ==
In 2006, St Richard's Catholic College was rated 'Outstanding' by Ofsted. Following an inspection in 2021, the school was rated 'Good', with inspectors noting a clear and ambitious vision for the curriculum and high standards of care for pupils. In 2018, the school also achieved a Level 1 rating across all sections of its Denominational Inspection Report.

== Notable alumni ==
- Alfredo Luciano Forte – Example student entry

== Reports and inspections ==
In 2006, St Richard's Catholic College was rated 'Outstanding' by Ofsted. Until the year 2020, the school was exempt by law from routine inspection.

In 2021, St. Richard's was inspected, after 15 years, and rated 'Good'. The inspection showed that 'Leaders and teachers have a clear and ambitious vision for the curriculum' and also that 'They are dedicated to providing all pupils with the best quality of education and care'. Of the school community, the HM Inspectorate commented, 'Parents and pupils are rightfully proud of their school community. They would not hesitate in recommending the school to others'. Finally, it was also noted that 'Pupils feel really safe and valued at St Richard’s Catholic College. Pupils know that there are adults who will listen to them and help them if they are worried about something or someone'.

St Richard's also scored a Level 1 (the highest rating) in each section of its 2018 Denominational Inspection Report.

== History ==
St. Richard's was opened in 1959. Its construction was funded, in part, by fundraising within the local Roman Catholic community. For example, in July 1958, just under £1000 was raised by Catholics in Eastbourne for the Diocesan education fund.

When it was first opened, the college was known as St. Richard's Roman Catholic School; it was named after St. Richard of Chichester (1197–1253), who visited Bexhill during his lifetime. It is probable that St. Richard built the manor house at Manor Barn, found in the ancient Old Town of Bexhill-on-Sea, the ruins of which are still visible today.

The raison d'être of St. Richard's Roman Catholic School was to offer a denominational secondary education for the local Catholic population. Hitherto, there had been several Catholic primary schools in the area (e.g., St. Mary Star of the Sea in Hastings and St. Joseph's in Eastbourne), though there had been no sufficient provision for Catholic children over the age of eleven. As a result, St. Joseph's in Eastbourne was severely overcrowded. The school had to take infants, juniors, and seniors, despite the fact that 'the buildings [were] totally inadequate to house all these groups for education'. St. Joseph's has since closed and been replaced by St. Thomas, a Becket Catholic Primary School.

St. Richard's is, as of December 2023, the only Catholic secondary school in East Sussex (the nearest alternatives being in Brighton and Tunbridge Wells). It has always had a substantial catchment area, traditionally ranging from Eastbourne, through Bexhill, to the vicinity of the Hastings area.

At the time of the school's construction, transporting children into Bexhill proved controversial within Eastbourne's town council. Indeed, a series of contemporary newspaper articles from the Eastbourne Gazette and Eastbourne Herald reveal the contention that surrounding the payment of the future pupils' train fares.

It was suggested in February 1958 that, when the school was built, Eastbourne's council should subsidise half the cost of Eastbourne pupils travelling into Bexhill. In March, however, the council's Education Committee voted by a majority of eight to six to cover the whole cost of pupils' fares. This decision followed a letter from the archdiocesan secretary responsible for education (at his time, Eastbourne and Bexhill both fell within an archdiocese–the Archdiocese of Southwark–as Arundel and Brighton had yet to be created). Yet, this was not the end of the episode. On 1 April, Eastbourne council's Finance Committee urged the main chamber to reconsider their U-turn. Concerned over the cost to ratepayers, the Finance Committee argued the council should only pay for half of pupils' fares. Travel for a single child would have cost 2s6d a week.

Finally, on 8 April, the council agreed with the Finance Committee and voted by a majority of twenty to five to subsidise only half of any future pupils' fares. Another vote, which passed by fourteen to eleven, allowed for families in 'hardship' to claim for a 100 p/c subsidy on rail fares. This proved controversial as some interpreted the vote to contradict contemporary directives issued by the Ministry of Education (whereby full fares, in that instance, could be paid). It was feared that many local Catholics simply could not afford the cost–and that many would be too proud to go 'cap in hand' to the council and plead 'hardship'. Some believed the decision was reached because of the denominational nature of the new school. Indeed, the council paid for the entire fares of other pupils travelling similar distances.

So, prior to the elections of May, the same year, local Cannon J J Curtin took the issue to the pulpit at Sunday Mass: "It would be a good if all Catholics," he said, "when canvassed for their votes [...] satisfied themselves that candidates would, if elected, endeavour to get the decision of Eastbourne Council to pay only half of the fare for pupils to the new Catholic school in Bexhill rescinded." Further action was taken by the local church in October. Archdiocesan representatives wrote to the relevant Ministry, complaining about the legality of the council's decision. However, after a legal review by the town clerk, the decision to pay for half fares was kept. The council held out on the issue.

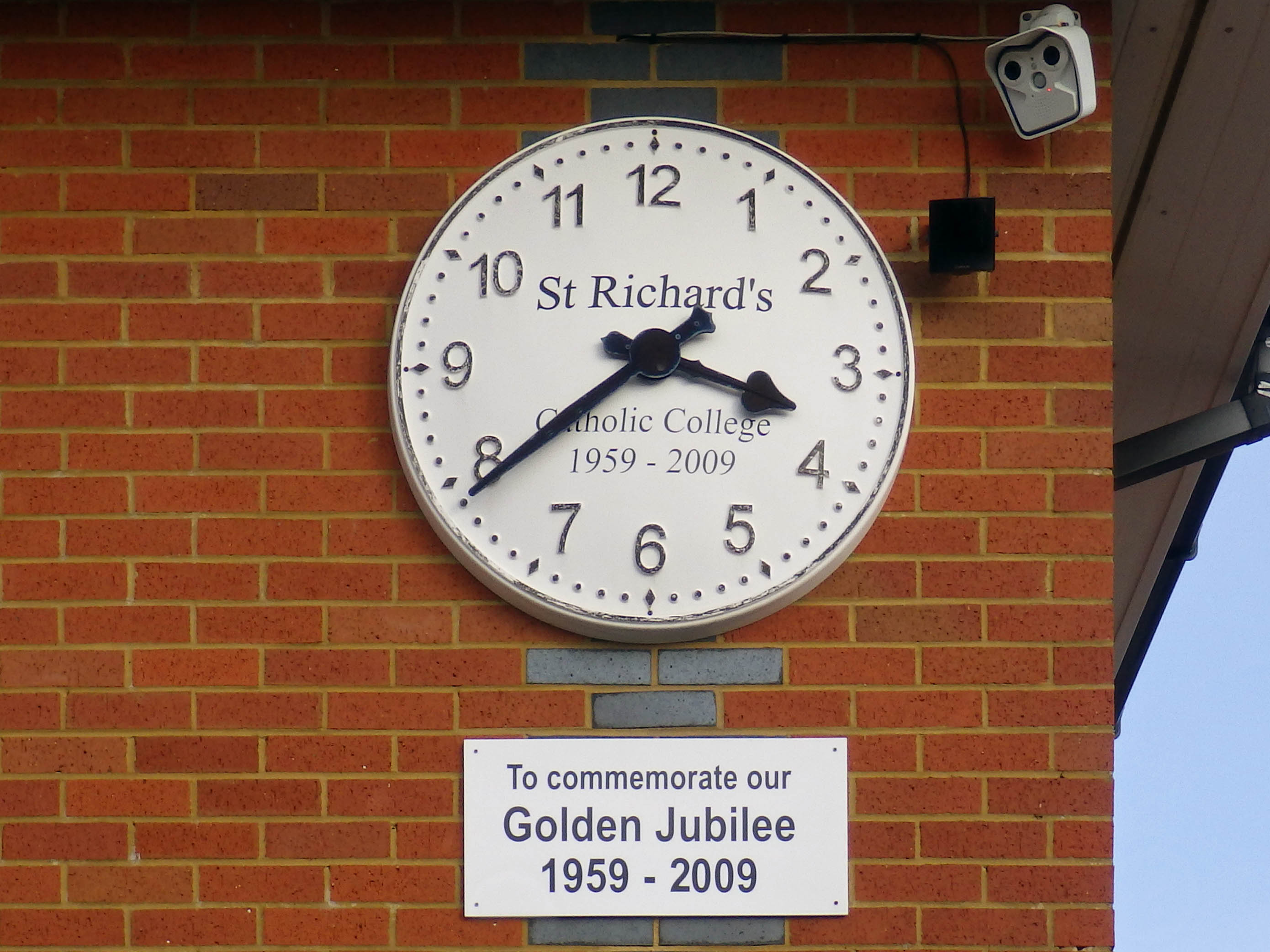
Clock at St Richard's Catholic College commemorating the school's golden jubilee

In its early years, St. Richard's Catholic School existed largely in the shadow of the local grammar (now Bexhill High Academy). This was because St Richard's offered placements based on faith rather than on intelligence. It is for this reason that St Richard's continues to have a higher than average proportion of pupils for whom English is a second language. However, following the Cessation of Grant Regulations 1975, which saw the conversion of many grammar schools across the country, the playing field between St Richard's and Bexhill High (as it was known) was to a level.

The former headteacher, Anthony Campbell's, achievements were recognised in the 2007 New Year's Honours List, in which he received an OBE for 'services to education'. Campbell retired in 2008; his retirement mass and celebrations were recorded in the local paper.

In 2018, the first year that the new grade 1 – 9 GCSEs were taken, 83% of pupils achieved a grade 4 or above in English and Maths.

In December 2023, the principal, Miss Doreen Cronin, retired after leading the school for 15 years and teaching there for 37 years. In January 2024, the school was handed over to the new headteacher, Mr Paul Barber.

On the 1st October 2025, the school converted to academy status, joining The Bosco Catholic Education Trust.

== House system ==
There are four houses at St Richard's Catholic College: Rigby, Wells, Gwyn and Howard (red, yellow, green and blue, respectively). Each house is named after an English martyr from around the time of the reformation. Apart from Saint Philip Howard, each of the martyrs for which the houses are named was canonised by Pope Paul VI in 1970. The former three are each one of the Forty Martyrs of England and Wales.

== School awards ==
St Richard's has been awarded, by the government, a Leading Edge Status. This means that they have been recognised as an example to others in how they teach. Also St Richard's is a Fairtrade School.

== Performance ==
In 2018, St Richards was ranked as second in the county for Progress 8 attainment; its rating stands as 'well above average'.

The 2023 GCSE results of the school showed that it is well above average compared to the national results from previous and current years with 41% of all subjects graded between 7–9 and 84% 4–9 in BASICs measures despite the results being graded down to pre-COVID levels from 2019.

St Richard’s Catholic College continues to be one of the best performing schools in East Sussex and in the top 2% of schools nationally, even competing against Grammar and independent schools.
