= Beeches Farm =

Farm in Bexhill, East Sussex

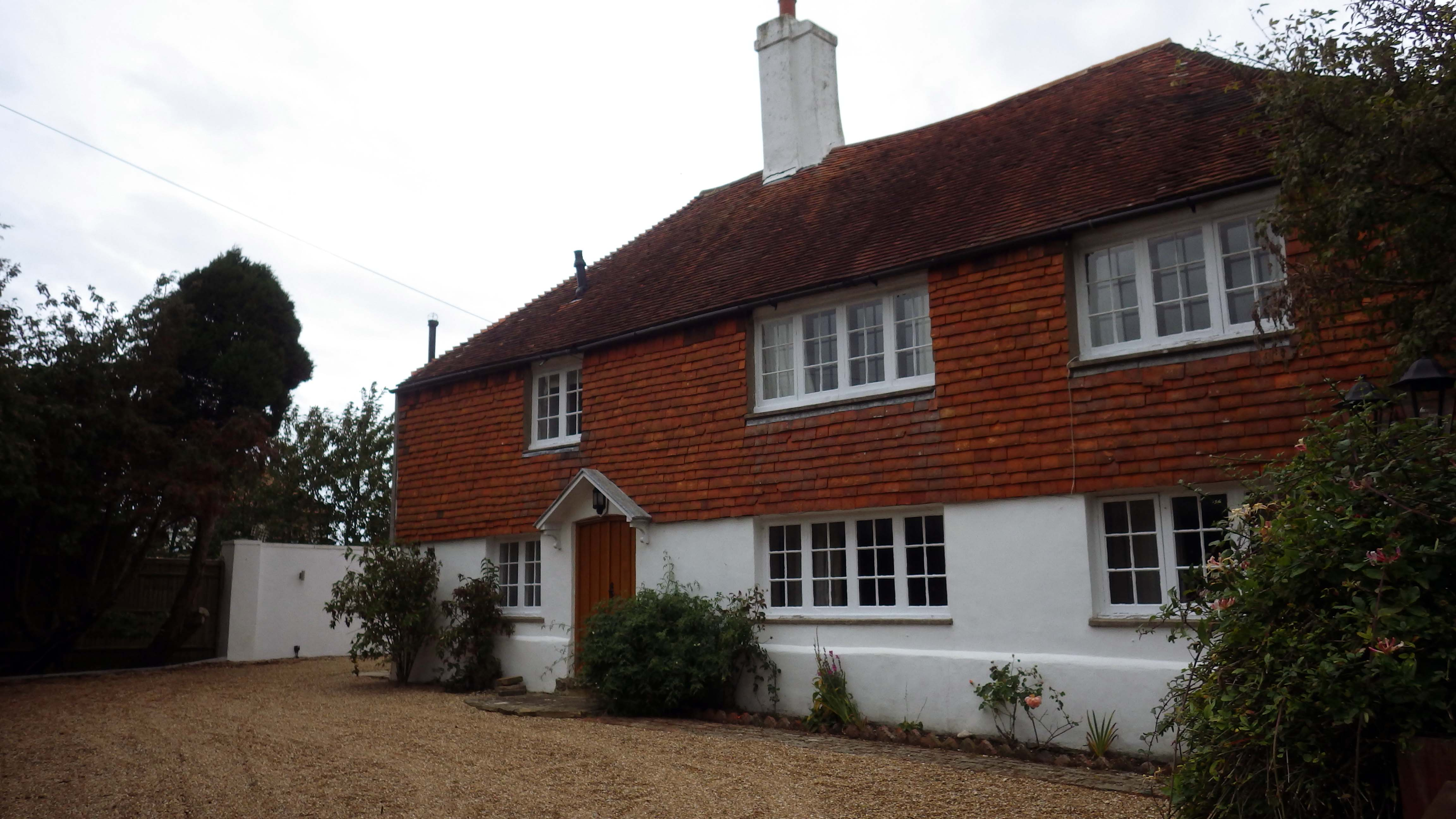
- Grade II listed.
- Town/City: Bexhill
- Country: United Kingdom
- Coordinates: 50.8464°N 0.4158°E
- Established: 18th century

Beeches Farm is a farm and country house in Bexhill, East Sussex, England. A Grade II listed building, it dates to at least the 18th century, and is a two-storey building with stuccoed brickwork on the ground floor, and a hipped tiled roof.
