= Frederick Menzies =

British physician and public health expert (1875–1949)

Sir Frederick Menzies KBE KStJ FRSE FRCP FRCPE
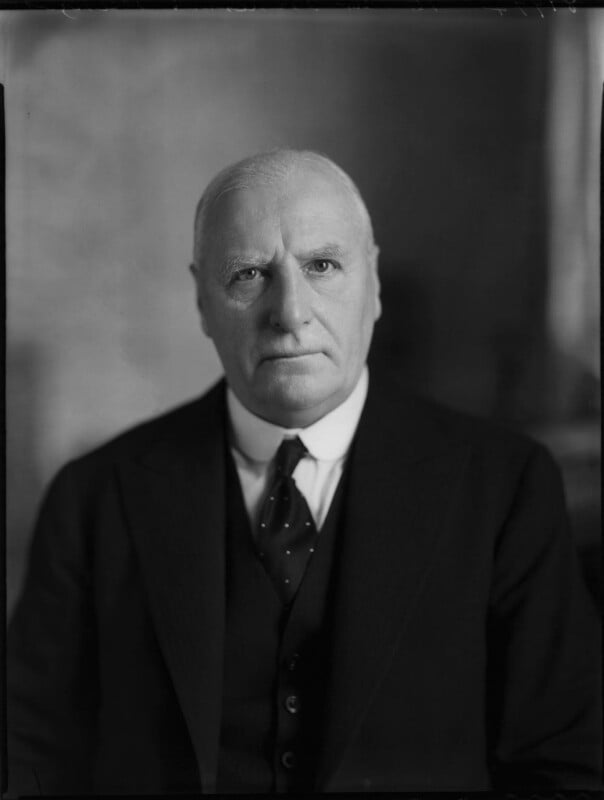
- Menzies in 1936

Medical Officer of Health to London County Council
- In office 1926–1939

Personal details
- Born: Frederick Norton Kay Menzies; 2 November 1875 Caernarvon, Wales
- Died: 14 May 1949 (aged 73) London, England
- Occupation: Physician

Sir Frederick Norton Kay Menzies (2 November 1875 – 14 May 1949) was a British physician and public health expert. He was Honorary Physician to King George VI.

== Early life ==
He was born in Caernarvon on 2 November 1875, the son of Edith Madeline Kay and her husband, John Menzies, a civil engineer. He was educated at Llandovery College then studied medicine at the University of Edinburgh graduating with an MB ChB in 1899.

== Early medical career ==
He then undertook postgraduate studies in both Berlin and Vienna returning to work at Edinburgh Royal Infirmary, receiving his doctorate (MD) in 1903. He moved on to Great Ormond Street Hospital in London then Brompton Hospital and the Western Fever Hospital.

In 1907 he became a Demonstrator in Public Health at University College, London under Prof Henry Richard Kenwood also becoming Kenwood's deputy as Medical Officer of Health for the Stoke Newington district. In 1909, he worked part time as a school doctor for London County Council, taking up a full time post in the East End of London in 1911.

== Later medical career ==
Menzies became principal assistant Medical Officer for Health, and part time public health consultant for London County Council's (LCC) responsible for the LCC scheme for the care of tuberculosis and for the diagnosis and care of venereal diseases in 1917.

In 1924 Menzies followed Sir John Napier as Director of Hospital and Medical Services of the Joint Council of the Order of St John and the British Red Cross Society, retaining a part time post at LCC.

In 1925 Menzies was appointed the Medical Officer of Health and School Medical Officer for London County Council taking up post in 1926.

In 1927 he was elected a Fellow of the Royal Society of Edinburgh. His proposers were Sir George Newman, Sir Robert William Philip, Edwin Bramwell, James Lorrain Smith and James Hartley Ashworth.

In the Second World War he co-ordinated Red Cross Hospitals in North Wales.

He was made a Knight Commander of the Order of the British Empire by King George V in 1932. He also received the Order of St John of Jerusalem, as a Commander in 1931 and Knight of Grace in 1934.

He died in London on 14 May 1949 following a business trip to Port Said.

== Family ==
He was married to Harriet May Lloyd in St Judes Church, Kensington in 1916. They had one daughter, Jean Valence, and two sons, Derek and Ian Robert. Derek was a Major in the Royal Welch Fusiliers, and was recorded missing in action in Normandy on 10 June 1944. Jean Valence Menzies died on 6 December 2019, aged 101 years and two months.
