= High Woods =

Protected area in East Sussex, England

Coordinates: 50.862°N 0.433°E

- Site of Special Scientific Interest
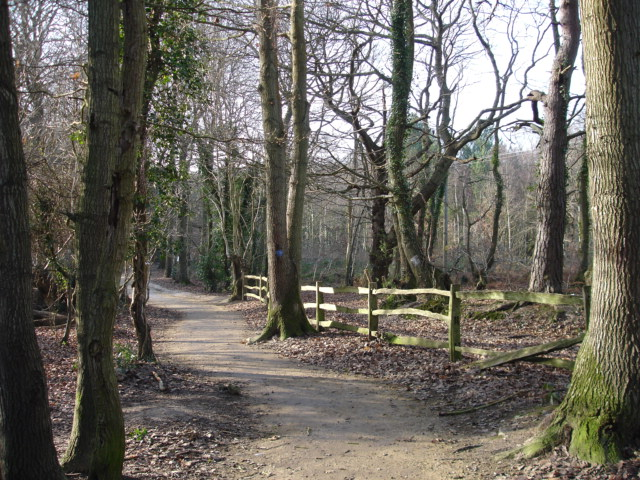
- Location of High Woods.
- Area of search: East Sussex
- Grid reference: TQ 713 098
- Interest: Biological
- Area: 33.7 hectares (83 acres)
- Notification date: 1985
- Location map: Magic Map

High Woods is a 33.7-hectare (83-acre) biological Site of Special Scientific Interest on the northern outskirts of Bexhill-on-Sea in East Sussex. It is owned by Rother District Council and managed by Highwoods Preservation Society.

This site has several different habitats, including the only area of sessile oak coppice in the county. There are also areas of pedunculate oak and birch woodland, acidic grassland on wet heath, ponds and streams. Moss species include Sphagnum squarrosum and Hookeria lucens.
