= Listed buildings in Bexhill-on-Sea =

Civil Parish in East Sussex, England

Bexhill-on-Sea is a village and civil parish in the Rother District, East Sussex, England. It contains one grade I, one grade II* and 79 grade II listed buildings that are recorded in the National Heritage List for England.

This list is based on the information retrieved online from Historic England.

== Key ==
Grade	Criteria
I	Buildings that are of exceptional interest
II*	Particularly important buildings of more than special interest
II	Buildings that are of special interest

== Listing ==
Name	Grade	Location	Type	Completed (Note: The date given is the date used by Historic England as significant for the initial building or that of an important part in the structure's description.)	Date designated	Grid ref. (Note: The grid reference is based on the British national grid reference system, sometimes known as OSGB36, used by the Ordnance Survey.) Geo-coordinates	Notes	Entry number (Note: The "List Entry Number" is a unique number assigned to each listed building and scheduled monument by Historic England.)	Image	Wikidata
Barnhorn Cottage	II	Barnhorn Road, Little Common			23 August 1976	TQ6933307762; 50°50′41″N 0°24′14″E		1352813	Upload Photo	Q26635789
Barnhorn Manor	II	Barnhorn Road, Little Common			2 July 1971	TQ6989107759; 50°50′40″N 0°24′42″E		1044269	Upload Photo	Q26296305
Barnhorne Manor	II	Barnhorn Road, Little Common			31 May 1974	TQ7068507674; 50°50′36″N 0°25′23″E		1352812	Upload Photo	Q26635788
50, 52 and 54, Belle Hill	II	50, 52 and 54, Belle Hill, Old Town			23 August 1976	TQ7415808070; 50°50′45″N 0°28′21″E		1044270	Upload Photo	Q26296306
Apple Tree Cottage	II	60, Belle Hill, Old Town			23 August 1976	TQ7420508064; 50°50′45″N 0°28′23″E		1352814	Upload Photo	Q26635790
Sorrell Cottage	II	74, Belle Hill, Old Town			23 August 1976	TQ7426108049; 50°50′45″N 0°28′26″E		1044271	Upload Photo	Q26296307
Goddards House	II	84, Belle Hill, Old Town			23 August 1976	TQ7437308001; 50°50′43″N 0°28′32″E		1044272	Upload Photo	Q26296308
Belclaire	II	86, Belle Hill, Old Town			11 May 1949	TQ7440407986; 50°50′42″N 0°28′33″E		1352815	Upload Photo	Q26635791
West Station	II	15 Terminus Road On Sea			27 February 2013	TQ7356207478; 50°50′27″N 0°27′50″E		1412228	Upload Photo	Q4899785
Seafront Shelter	II	on De La Warr Parade between junctions with Bolebrooke Road and Bedford Avenue			15 February 2013	TQ7491107319; 50°50′20″N 0°28′58″E		1413149	Upload Photo	Q26676319
Buckholt Farmhouse, Including The Wall On Either Side Of The House To The East And West	II	Buckholt Lane			11 May 1949	TQ7475910999; 50°52′19″N 0°28′57″E		1044273	Upload Photo	Q26296309
Barrack Hall	II	Chantry Lane, Old Town			7 August 1975	TQ7447608051; 50°50′44″N 0°28′37″E		1352816	Upload Photo	Q26635792
The Barn or Granary to the North East of the Rectory	II	Church Street, Old Town			23 August 1976	TQ7455008174; 50°50′48″N 0°28′41″E		1044276	Upload Photo	Q26296312
Rimswell Cottage	II	Church Street, Old Town			23 August 1976	TQ7458108056; 50°50′44″N 0°28′43″E		1044278	Upload Photo	Q26296314
Parish Church of St Peter	II*	Church Street, Old Town			11 May 1949	TQ7460708096; 50°50′46″N 0°28′44″E		1352817	Upload Photo	Q17556167
2 and 3, Church Street	II	2 and 3, Church Street, Old Town			23 August 1976	TQ7462008028; 50°50′44″N 0°28′44″E		1044274	Upload Photo	Q26296310
4, Church Street	II	4, Church Street, Old Town			23 August 1976	TQ7461908038; 50°50′44″N 0°28′44″E		1190072	Upload Photo	Q26485119
Lychgate	II	5, Church Street, Old Town			11 May 1949	TQ7461708046; 50°50′44″N 0°28′44″E		1044275	Upload Photo	Q26296311
Lychgate Cottage	II	5a, Church Street, Old Town			11 May 1949	TQ7462808050; 50°50′44″N 0°28′45″E		1190085	Upload Photo	Q26485133
6-10, Church Street	II	6-10, Church Street, Old Town			23 August 1976	TQ7459608062; 50°50′45″N 0°28′43″E		1190095	Upload Photo	Q26485144
11-13, Church Street	II	11-13, Church Street, Old Town			23 August 1976	TQ7458208063; 50°50′45″N 0°28′43″E		1044277	Upload Photo	Q26296313
Bexhill Antique Centre	II	De La Warr Road, Old Town			23 August 1976	TQ7459408005; 50°50′43″N 0°28′43″E		1190105	Upload Photo	Q26485153
Ruins of the Former Manor House	II	De La Warr Road, Old Town			11 May 1949	TQ7463607997; 50°50′43″N 0°28′45″E		1044281	Upload Photo	Q26296318
Yew Tree Cottage	II	1, De La Warr Road, Old Town			23 August 1976	TQ7463508034; 50°50′44″N 0°28′45″E		1044279	Upload Photo	Q26296316
Seaview Cottage	II	3, De La Warr Road, Old Town			23 August 1976	TQ7463708045; 50°50′44″N 0°28′45″E		1190114	Upload Photo	Q26485164
Camellia Corner	II	7, De La Warr Road, Old Town			23 August 1976	TQ7464708043; 50°50′44″N 0°28′46″E		1044280	Upload Photo	Q26296317
Glyne Farmhouse	II	Glyne Drive			11 May 1949	TQ7627708307; 50°50′51″N 0°30′10″E		1293939	Upload Photo	Q26581830
Beech Cottage	II	2, Green Lane, Little Common			23 August 1976	TQ7161008022; 50°50′47″N 0°26′11″E		1044282	Upload Photo	Q26296319
Remains of the Downs Windmill	II	Gunters Lane			11 May 1949	TQ7329808716; 50°51′07″N 0°27′38″E		1044283	Upload Photo	Q26296320
Nazareth House	II	Hastings Road			17 June 1993	TQ7547408544; 50°50′59″N 0°29′29″E		1252827	Upload Photo	Q26544659
East Lodge	II	3, Hastings Road, Old Town			23 August 1976	TQ7477308088; 50°50′45″N 0°28′52″E		1293946	Upload Photo	Q26581837
Forge House	II	1, High Street, Old Town			23 August 1976	TQ7458407964; 50°50′41″N 0°28′43″E		1352818	Upload Photo	Q26635793
2 and 4, High Street	II	2 and 4, High Street, Old Town			23 August 1976	TQ7459007999; 50°50′43″N 0°28′43″E		1044285	Upload Photo	Q26296322
3 and 5, High Street	II	3 and 5, High Street, Old Town			23 August 1976	TQ7458307980; 50°50′42″N 0°28′43″E		1293949	Upload Photo	Q26581840
6, High Street	II	6, High Street, Old Town			23 August 1976	TQ7457608007; 50°50′43″N 0°28′42″E		1293924	Upload Photo	Q26581817
Hanover House	II	7, High Street, Old Town			23 August 1976	TQ7457707984; 50°50′42″N 0°28′42″E		1044284	Upload Photo	Q26296321
8, High Street	II	8, High Street, Old Town			23 August 1976	TQ7456308009; 50°50′43″N 0°28′42″E		1352820	Upload Photo	Q26635795
Linkwell	II	9, High Street, Old Town			11 May 1949	TQ7453907989; 50°50′42″N 0°28′40″E		1352819	Upload Photo	Q26635794
Garden Wall to the East and West of Linkwell	II	9, High Street, Old Town			23 August 1976	TQ7456007997; 50°50′43″N 0°28′41″E		1190170	Upload Photo	Q26485224
10, High Street	II	10, High Street, Old Town			23 August 1976	TQ7456808020; 50°50′43″N 0°28′42″E		1044286	Upload Photo	Q26296323
Osborn House	II	14, High Street, Old Town			23 August 1976	TQ7454408015; 50°50′43″N 0°28′41″E		1190180	Upload Photo	Q26485233
Boswell House	II	22, High Street, Old Town			11 May 1949	TQ7452508024; 50°50′43″N 0°28′40″E		1044287	Upload Photo	Q26296324
24, High Street	II	24, High Street, Old Town			23 August 1976	TQ7451008027; 50°50′44″N 0°28′39″E		1352821	Upload Photo	Q26635796
The Little Bee Hive	II	26, High Street, Old Town			23 August 1976	TQ7450608037; 50°50′44″N 0°28′39″E		1190188	Upload Photo	Q26485240
Chantry Cottage	II	28, High Street, Old Town			11 May 1949	TQ7450308053; 50°50′44″N 0°28′39″E		1044288	Upload Photo	Q26296325
Hunter's Moon	II	Howard's Crescent, Little Common			23 August 1976	TQ7100007890; 50°50′43″N 0°25′39″E		1190192	Upload Photo	Q26485244
Berkeley Mansions	II	Knole Road			24 May 1990	TQ7468607237; 50°50′18″N 0°28′47″E		1044256	Upload Photo	Q26296290
Seafront shelter	II	along De La Warr Parade opposite Lionel Road			15 February 2013	TQ7512507423; 50°50′23″N 0°29′09″E		1413150	Upload Photo	Q26676320
Stone Cottages	II	1 and 2, Little Common Road			23 August 1976	TQ7241807978; 50°50′44″N 0°26′52″E		1044246	Upload Photo	Q26296279
109, Little Common Road	II	109, Little Common Road			23 August 1976	TQ7298708062; 50°50′46″N 0°27′21″E		1044245	Upload Photo	Q26296278
The De La Warr Pavilion	I	Marina			28 January 1971	TQ7411407134; 50°50′15″N 0°28′17″E		1352840	Upload Photo	Q1180081
Shelter Opposite the South End of Middlesex Road	II	Marina			23 August 1976	TQ7477807223; 50°50′17″N 0°28′51″E		1044247	Upload Photo	Q26296280
Bexhill War Memorial	II	Marina, TN40 1LA			11 September 2025	TQ7448307184; 50°50′16″N 0°28′36″E		1494199	Upload Photo	Q83191268
Numbers 4-22 (even) and Attached Railings	II	Marina Court Avenue			15 September 1997	TQ7424707119; 50°50′15″N 0°28′24″E		1072606	Upload Photo	Q26328347
The New Inn	II	Ninfield Road, Sidley			23 August 1976	TQ7413809181; 50°51′21″N 0°28′22″E		1352841	Upload Photo	Q26635814
The High House	II	Ninfield Road, Sidley			11 May 1949	TQ7253810292; 50°51′59″N 0°27′02″E		1044248	Upload Photo	Q26296281
Martello Tower No 55, South Of Beachside	II	Normans Bay			23 August 1976	TQ6807505306; 50°49′22″N 0°23′06″E		1044268	Upload Photo	Q17667031
Pebsham Farmhouse	II	Pebsham Lane			11 May 1949	TQ7653809019; 50°51′13″N 0°30′24″E		1352842	Upload Photo	Q26635815
30, Pembury Grove	II	30, Pembury Grove			5 April 1990	TQ7350109114; 50°51′20″N 0°27′49″E		1252833	Upload Photo	Q26544665
Beeches Farm	II	Sandhurst Lane, Little Common			23 August 1976	TQ7022508032; 50°50′48″N 0°25′00″E		1352843	Upload Photo	Q20878076
Sandhurst Lodge	II	Sandhurst Lane, Little Common			11 May 1949	TQ7034708002; 50°50′47″N 0°25′06″E		1044249	Upload Photo	Q26296282
The Roman Catholic Church of St Mary Magdalene	II	Sea Road			23 August 1976	TQ7456107580; 50°50′29″N 0°28′41″E		1352844	Upload Photo	Q23302362
School or Hall Adjoining the Roman Catholic Church of St Mary Magdalene on the North East	II	Sea Road			23 August 1976	TQ7459807602; 50°50′30″N 0°28′43″E		1044251	Upload Photo	Q26296284
The Parish Church of St Barnabas	II	Sea Road			23 August 1976	TQ7453207359; 50°50′22″N 0°28′39″E		1044250	Upload Photo	Q26296283
Seafront Shelter	II	on De La Warr Parade between Junctions of Sea Road and Brassey Road			15 February 2013	TQ7455807182; 50°50′16″N 0°28′40″E		1413130	Upload Photo	Q26676318
All Saints Lane	II	Sidley, TN39 5HA			19 January 2021	TQ7379809228; 50°51′23″N 0°28′05″E		1470572	Upload Photo	Q105081345
58, South Cliff	II	58, South Cliff			24 August 1998	TQ7238906853; 50°50′08″N 0°26′49″E		1376151	Upload Photo	Q26656800
Hamptons	II	16, St Leonards Road			19 October 2001	TQ7433707383; 50°50′23″N 0°28′29″E		1389578	Upload Photo	Q26669012
Bexhill Central Railway Station	II	Station Road On Sea			19 November 1999	TQ7448707537; 50°50′28″N 0°28′37″E		1379825	Upload Photo	Q2063602
The Colonnade	II	The Promenade			20 November 2008	TQ7413907083; 50°50′13″N 0°28′18″E		1392998	Upload Photo	Q26672193
Rother District Council	II	Town Hall, London Road, TN39 3JX			18 November 2022	TQ7407507599; 50°50′30″N 0°28′16″E		1483735	Upload Photo	Q106215178
The Lane Memorial	II	Town Hall Square			23 August 1976	TQ7405807554; 50°50′29″N 0°28′15″E		1190229	Upload Photo	Q26485281
The Grange	II	Upper Sea Road, Old Town			2 July 1971	TQ7455807916; 50°50′40″N 0°28′41″E		1352845	Upload Photo	Q26635818
Garden Wall to the North East and to the East of the Grange	II	Upper Sea Road, Old Town			23 August 1976	TQ7456707915; 50°50′40″N 0°28′42″E		1293879	Upload Photo	Q26581777
Preston Hall	II	Watermill Lane			23 August 1976	TQ7388109968; 50°51′47″N 0°28′10″E		1044252	Upload Photo	Q26296285
Cottage in the Grounds and to the East of Preston Hall	II	Watermill Lane			23 August 1976	TQ7390509950; 50°51′46″N 0°28′11″E		1044253	Upload Photo	Q26296287
Cockerels Farmhouse	II	Watermill Lane			23 August 1976	TQ7368310399; 50°52′01″N 0°28′01″E		1190249	Upload Photo	Q26493867
The House by the Stream	II	Watermill Lane			23 August 1976	TQ7348911489; 50°52′37″N 0°27′53″E		1352846	Upload Photo	Q26635819
Barn and Oasthouse to the South West of Whydown Farmhouse	II	Whydown Road			23 August 1976	TQ7068409453; 50°51′34″N 0°25′26″E		1044254	Upload Photo	Q26296288
Whydown Farmhouse	II	Whydown Road			23 August 1976	TQ7070709485; 50°51′35″N 0°25′27″E		1190250	Upload Photo	Q26493868
Boulder Cottage	II	Worsham Lane			23 August 1976	TQ7556409204; 50°51′21″N 0°29′35″E		1044255	Upload Photo	Q26296289

== See also ==
- Grade I listed buildings in East Sussex
- Grade II* listed buildings in East Sussex

== Sources ==
- Antram, Nicholas; Pevsner, Nikolaus (2012) [1965], Sussex: East, The Buildings of England, New Haven and London: Yale University Press, ISBN 978-0-300-18473-0
