= Bexhill High Academy =

Location
- Gunters Lane; Bexhill-on-Sea, East Sussex, TN39 4BY; England; 50.8567°N 0.45731°E

Information
- Type: Academy
- Department for Education URN: 138895 Tables
- Ofsted: Reports
- Head teacher: Craig Neal
- Gender: Coeducational
- Age: 11 to 16
- Website: www.bexhillacademy.org

Bexhill High Academy (formerly Bexhill High School) is a coeducational secondary school with academy status, located in Bexhill-on-Sea in the English county of East Sussex.

Bexhill High converted to academy status in November 2012. It had been a community school administered by East Sussex County Council. The school continues to coordinate with East Sussex County Council for admissions. As an academy, the school was previously part of the Prospects Academies Trust. However, in May 2014 the trust folded. Bexhill High Academy is now part of the Attwood Academies trust.

Along with Bexhill College the school operates Bexhill FM, a Restricted Service Licence FM frequency station which broadcasts for a few weeks a year to the Bexhill area.

== Notable former pupils ==
- Hayley Okines, subject of documentary
- Nils Norman, artist
- Alexia Walker, cricketer

== Notable former staff ==
- Russell Floyd, actor
- Karen Tweed, piano accordionist
