= Bexhill College =

Coordinates: 50°50′54″N 0°29′30″E

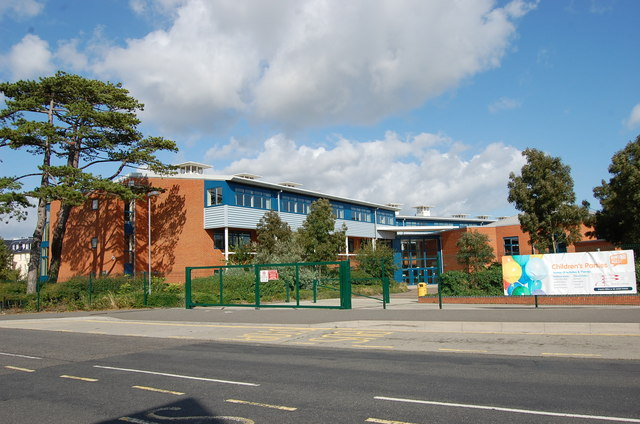

Location
- Penland Road; Bexhill-on-Sea, East Sussex, TN40 2JG; England

Information
- Type: Sixth form college
- Established: c1997
- Department for Education URN: 130670 Tables
- Ofsted: Reports
- Principal: Karen Hucker
- Age: 16 to 19
- Enrolment: c2500 students
- Website: http://www.bexhillcollege.ac.uk

Bexhill College is a sixth form college in the south-east of England. The college is based in Bexhill-on-Sea, East Sussex and is located on Penland Road, north-east of the town centre. The college is rated Outstanding as of its latest Ofsted report, which took place in 2024.

== History ==
Bexhill College is the direct successor of the County Schools for Boys and Girls, opened on 5 October 1926. In 1945 following the Education Act, the schools became Grammar Schools. The Boys' and Girls' County Grammar Schools merged on 26 September 1970 and became a sixth form college in 1977. The college was initially located on Turkey Road in Sidley, but relocated officially to Penland Road in late c2006.

== General information ==
As of 2018, the college enrolls nearly 2000 students with the majority of the day students aged 16–19. The main college buildings are located all on one site, with a wide range of facilities catering for the 80 plus courses available.

The college also runs an adult learning centre, offering recreational evening and daytime classes as well as a range of qualification courses.

Prior to 2025 the college had co-located with post-16 students of Glyne Gap School, and the Glyne Gap students had been given their own open-air space within the college grounds.

== Facilities ==
Bexhill College has a variety of facilities, all located on its 5.6-hectare site.

- Izzard Theatre was opened in December 2013 by Eddie Izzard. It is a 200-seater space, with retractable seating. The theatre is used for multiple events such as shows performed by students to assemblies and political hustings. The theatre block includes a hair salon, drama studio, recording studio and catering kitchen.
- Sports facilities consist of a 3G all weather pitch, 2 dance studios, an indoor multisport hall, a climbing wall, 3 tennis courts, a large grass training area and a modern gym.
- Learning Resource Centre (LRC)
- Refectory
- Science Laboratories

== Current student life ==
Students who attend the college are from Bexhill and the surrounding areas of Rother, Hastings and Eastbourne. Full-time students study a wide range of courses including vocational ones, GCSEs and A-Level qualifications. The college began to offer T-Levels in 2021.

Enrichment

The college’s enrichment programme gives students the opportunity to take part in extra-curricular activities throughout the year.

The college also offers a sport academy programme, which means students represent their college in competitions or games, alongside their studies. The sports available are: Athletics, Badminton, Basketball, Cricket, Football (the academy is in association with Chelsea FC foundation), Golf, Netball, Performing arts, Rugby, Swimming, Table tennis, Tennis and Volleyball.

There is also a Performing Arts Academy in which the students can develop their full potential in singing, dancing, acting and performing.

== International students ==
International students have a choice of accommodation, which include Bexhill College’s own student houses or living with a Host Family.

== Adult education ==
Despite being primarily for 16-19 year olds, Bexhill College offers adult education classes. These are run through the day and as evening classes. The college offers professional qualifications such as certificates, diplomas, as well as a wide range of GCSEs and other recreational courses.

== Notable alumni ==
- Godfrey Argent, photographer
- Jo Brand, comedian, writer and actress
- Michael Cowpland, businessman
- Gordon Hillman, archaeologist
- Mike Leadbitter, journalist
- James McCartney, musician
- Stella McCartney, fashion designer
- Hayley Okines, activist
- John Pitman, journalist
- Francis Robinson, historian
- Charity Wakefield, actress
