= Henry Richard Kenwood =

British professor of public health

Prof Henry Richard Kenwood CMG, FRSE, FCS (22 December 1862- 7 June 1945) was a British professor of public health.

== Life ==
He was born on 22 December 1862 at Bexhill-on-Sea in Sussex the son of John Kenwood of Wadhurst and Isabel Holmes. He was educated at the Collegiate School in Tunbridge Wells. He then studied medicine, Public Health and Chemistry, first at the London Hospital Medical College and the University of Edinburgh. He did postgraduate studies in Paris then began assisting Professor Corfield at the London Hospital Medical College as a Demonstrator from 1890. In 1893 he was appointed Medical Officer of Health for Finchley and in 1894 moved to Stoke Newington. He later became Consulting Medical Officer of Health for Bedfordshire.

In 1909 he was elected a Fellow of the Royal Society of Edinburgh. His proposers were George Newman, Francis John Allan, Sir Byrom Bramwell, and Daniel John Cunningham. In Scotland he lived at Losebery on Kirkpark Road in Elie in Fife.

In 1918 he was created a Companion of the Order of St Michael and St George (CMG).

From 1920 to 1924 he was assisted by Frederick Menzies.

He died on 7 June 1945.

== Publications ==
- Hygiene and Public Health (1890 plus multiple editions)
- Public Health Laboratory Work (1893)
