= Bexhill-on-Sea =

Seaside town in East Sussex, England

Coordinates: 50°50′30″N 0°28′16″E

Bexhill-on-Sea: Bexhill
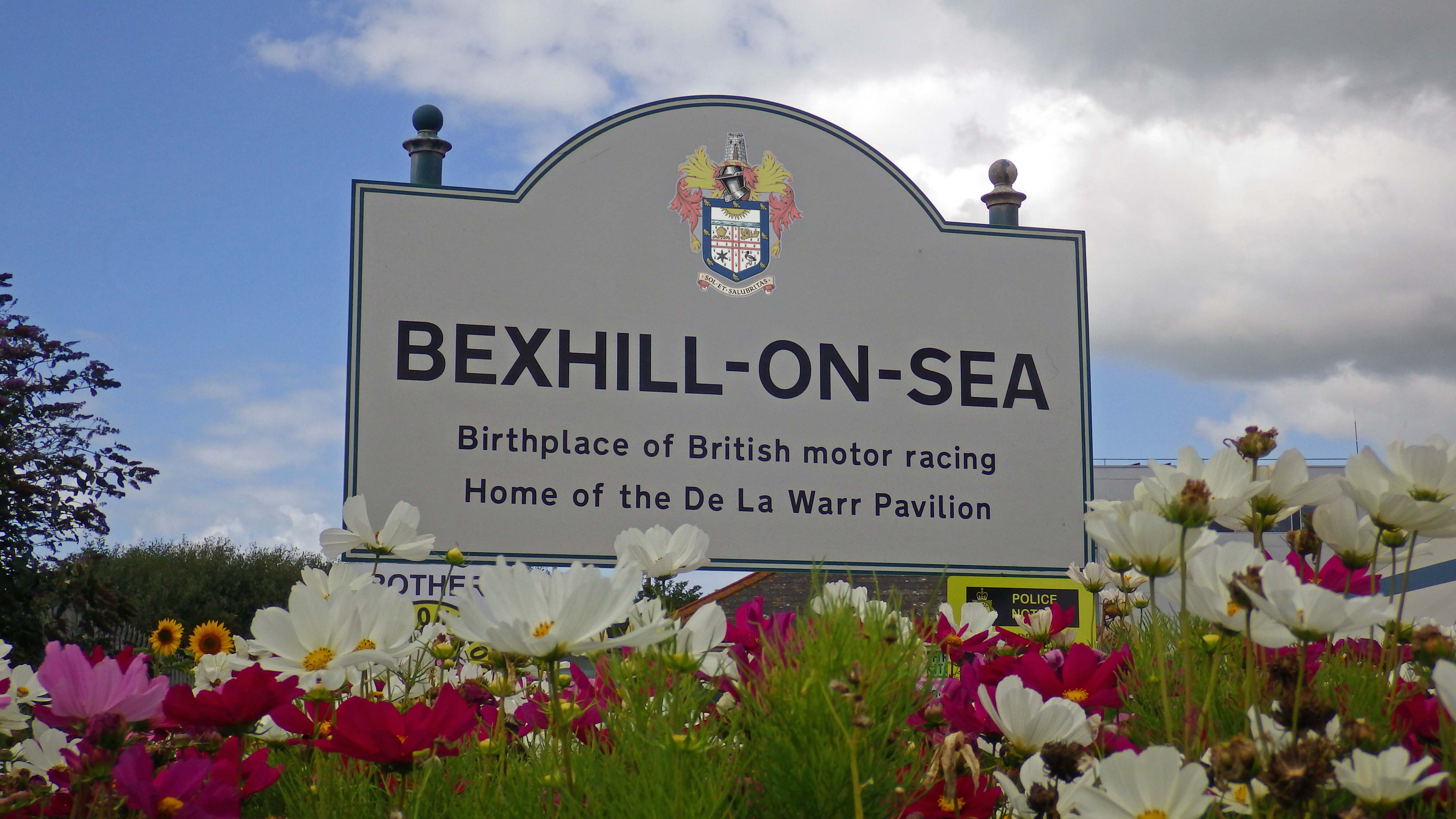
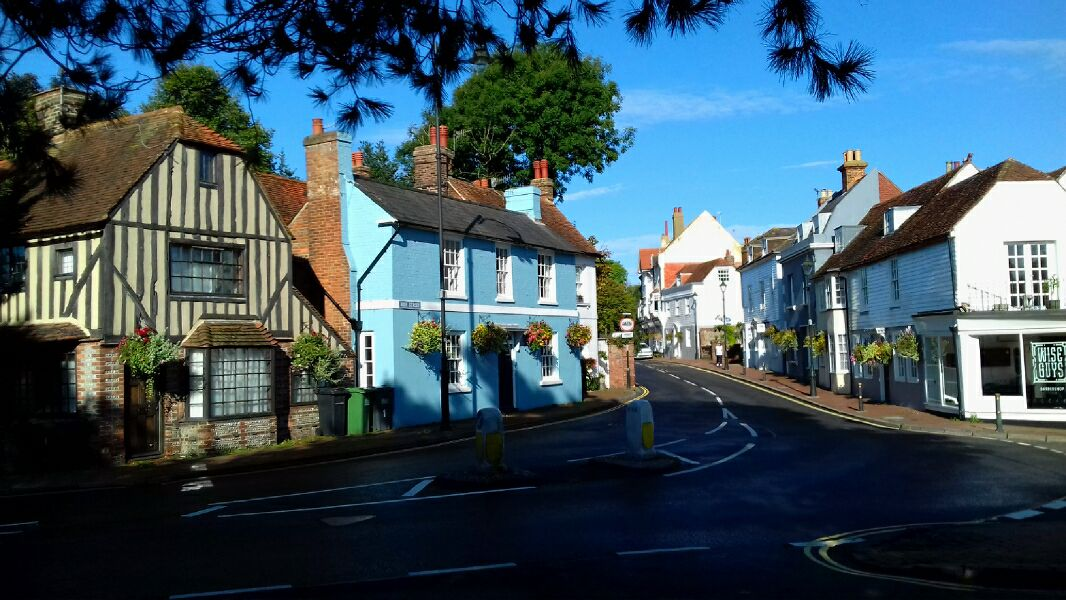
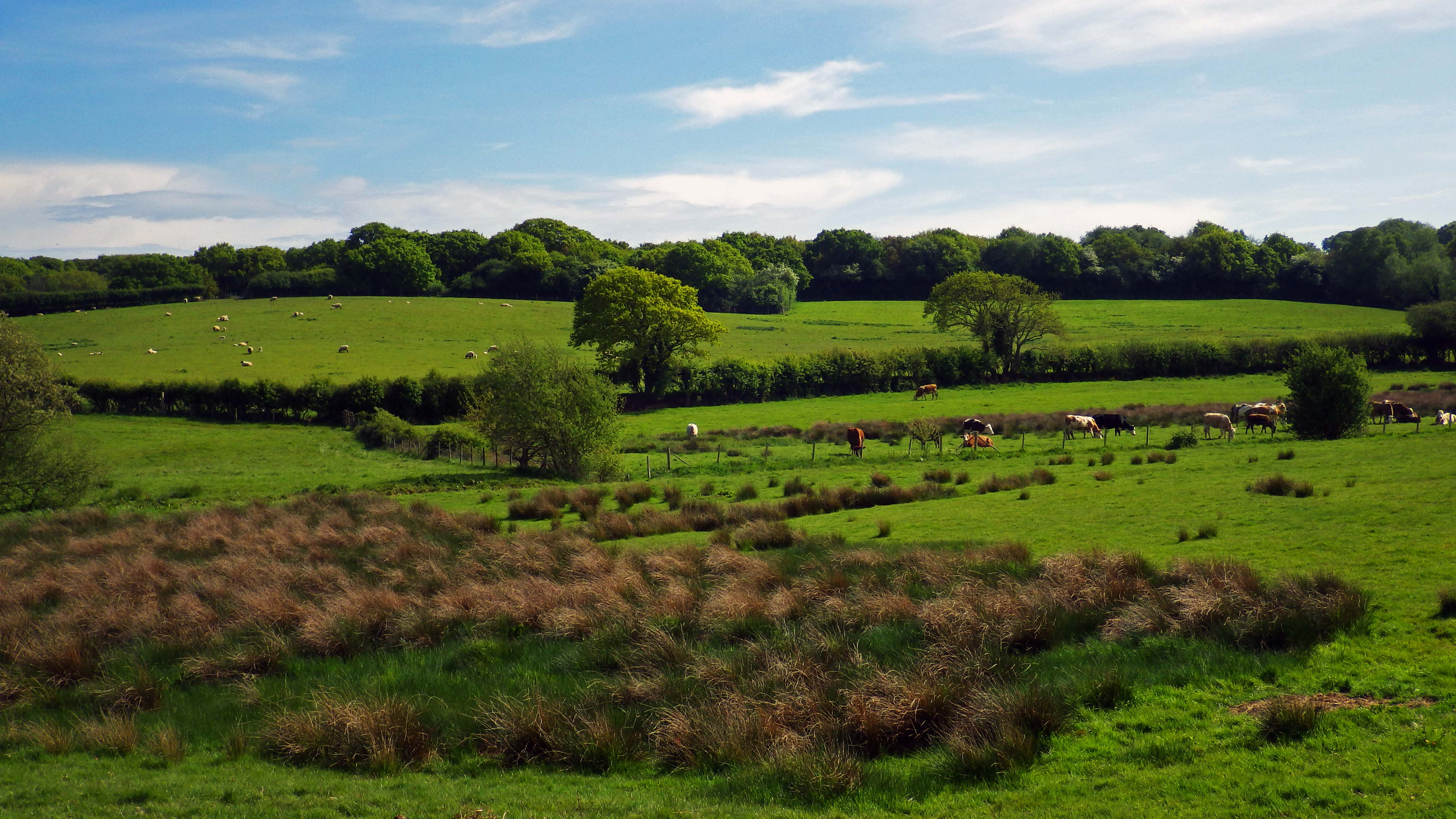
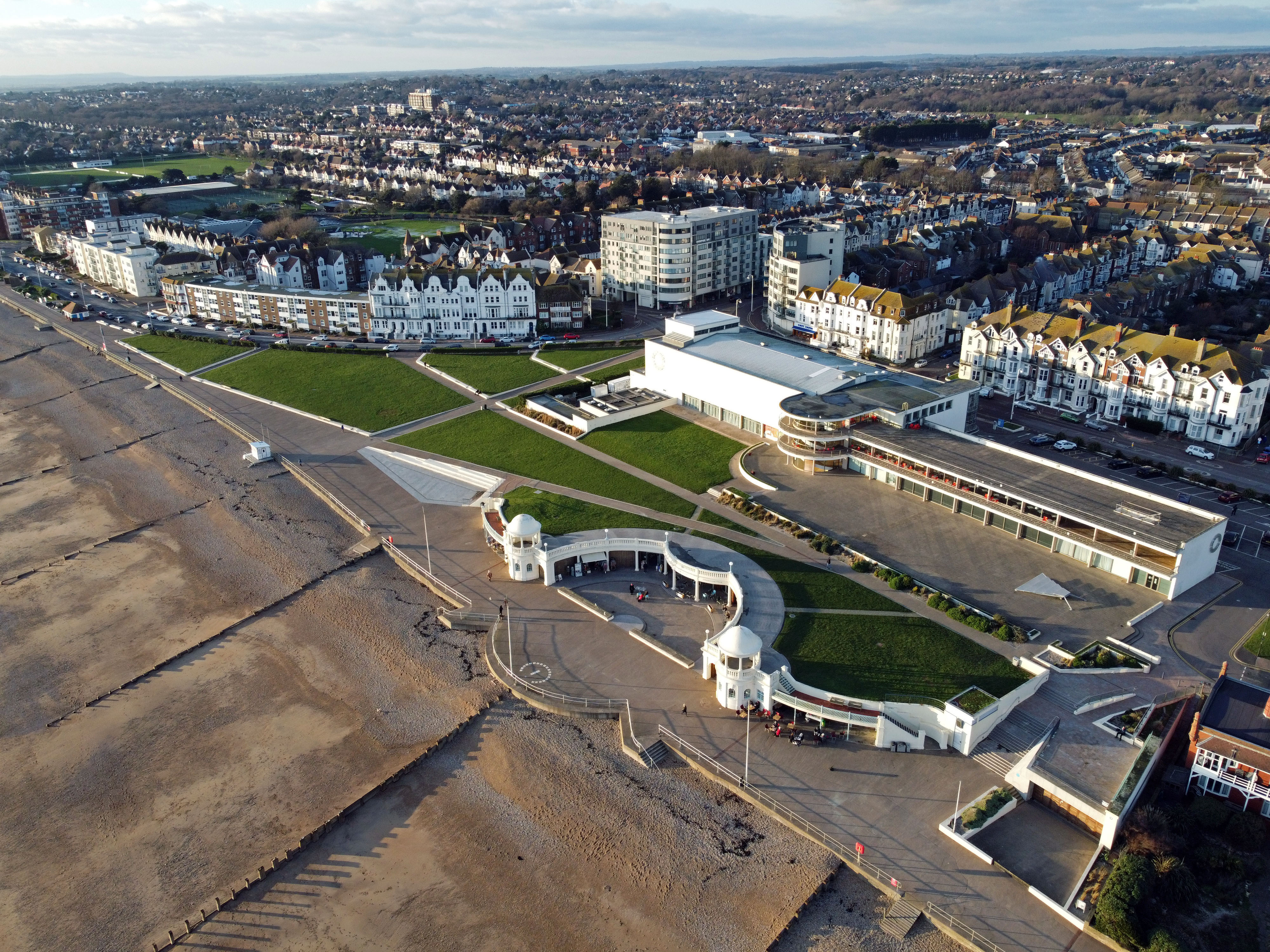
- Clockwise from top: Town welcome sign; Combe Valley Countryside Park; De La Warr Pavilion and Central Parade; High Street, Old Town.

- Official flag and coat of arms of Bexhill-on-Sea.

- Location within East Sussex
- Area: 32.31 km^{2} (12.47 sq mi)
- Population: 41,173 (2007); 43,478 (2015); 43,754 (2021)
  - Density: 1,274/sq mi (492/km^{2})
- OS grid reference: TQ737092
  - London: 52.7 mi (84.8 km) NNW
- Civil parish: Bexhill-on-Sea
- District: Rother
- Shire county: East Sussex
- Region: South East
- Country: England
- Sovereign state: United Kingdom
- Post town: BEXHILL-ON-SEA
- Postcode district: TN39-40
- Dialling code: 01424
- Police: Sussex
- Fire: East Sussex
- Ambulance: South East Coast
- UK Parliament: Bexhill and Battle

Bexhill-on-Sea (often shortened to Bexhill) is a seaside town and civil parish in the Rother district of the East Sussex county of South East England. It is located along the Sussex Coast and between the towns of Hastings and Eastbourne. In 2021, it had a population of 43,754.

== History ==
The first reference to Bexhill, or Bexelei as it was originally called, was in a charter granted by King Offa of Mercia in 772 AD. It is recorded that Offa had "defeated the men of Hastings" in 771 AD.

At this time, the term Hastings would have referred to this whole area rather than the town itself as it does today. In the charter, Offa established a church and religious community in Bexhill.

The name Bexhill derives from the Old English byxelēah meaning 'boxtree wood or clearing'.

During the Norman Conquest of 1066, it appears that Bexhill was largely destroyed. The Domesday survey of 1086 records that the manor was worth £20 before the conquest, was "waste" in 1066, and was worth £18 10s in 1086. King William I used the lands he had conquered to reward his knights and gave Bexhill manor to Robert, Count of Eu, with most of the Hastings area. Robert's grandson, John, Count of Eu, gave back the manor to the bishops of Chichester in 1148 and it is probable that the first manor house was built by the bishops at this time. The later manor house, the ruins of which can still be seen at the Manor Gardens in Bexhill Old Town, was built about 1250, probably on the instructions of St. Richard, Bishop of Chichester. St Richard's Catholic College, the local Catholic school, was duly for said Bishop.

The Manor House was the easternmost residence owned by the bishops and would have been used as a place to stay while travelling around or through the eastern part of their diocese. There were often disputes between the Bishops of Chichester and the Abbots of Battle Abbey, usually about land ownership in this area. In 1276 a large portion of Bexhill was made into a park for hunting and in 1447 Bishop Adam de Moleyns was given permission to fortify the Manor House.

In 1561, Queen Elizabeth I took possession of Bexhill Manor and three years later she gave it to Sir Thomas Sackville, Earl of Dorset. The Earls, later Dukes, of Dorset owned Bexhill until the mid-19th century. Their main residences were Buckhurst Place in Sussex and Knole House in Kent.

In 1804, soldiers of the King's German Legion were stationed in barracks at Bexhill. These troops were Hanoverians who had escaped when their country was overrun by Napoleon's French Army. As King George III was also the Elector of Hanover, he welcomed them, and they fought as part of the British Army. At about this time, defensive Martello towers were built along the south-east coast, some near Bexhill, in order to repel any French invasion.

In 1814 the soldiers of the King's German Legion left Bexhill, eventually playing an important part in the Battle of Waterloo the following year. The German troops had been here to protect Bexhill from the French. However, many of the local people were actively trading with the enemy by way of smuggling. The best known of the local smugglers were in the Little Common Gang and the most famous incident was the infamous Battle of Sidley Green in 1828.

In 1813, Elizabeth Sackville married George Sackville-West, 5th Earl De La Warr, and when the male line of the Dukes of Dorset died out in 1865 she and her husband inherited Bexhill.

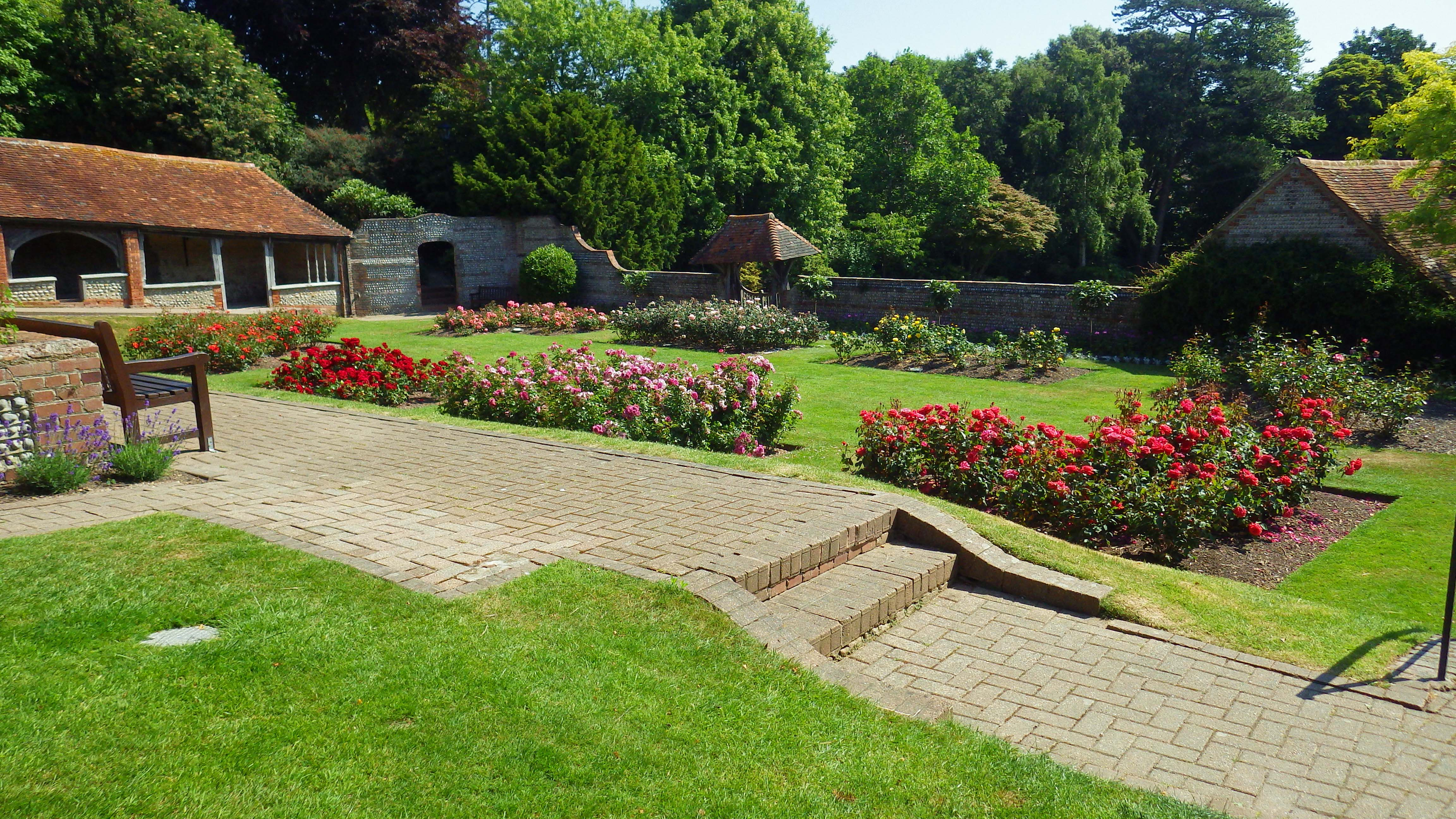
Manor Gardens, Old Town

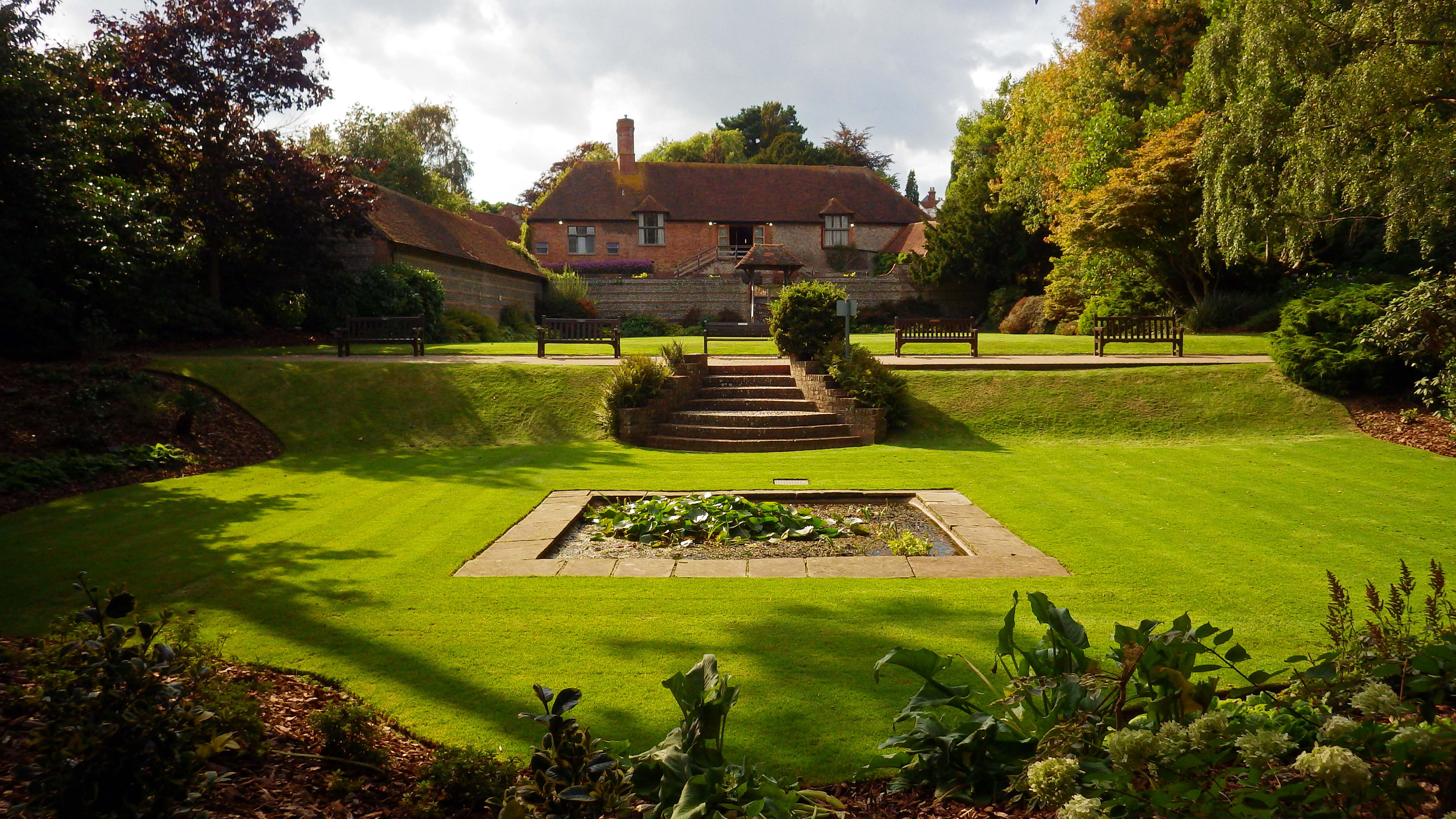
Manor Barn, as seen from garden, Old Town

It was Reginald Sackville, 7th Earl De La Warr who decided to transform the small rural village of Bexhill into an exclusive seaside resort. He contracted the builder, John Webb, to construct the first sea wall and to lay out De La Warr Parade. Webb, in part payment for his work, was given all the land extending from Sea Road to the Polegrove, south of the railway line. Opened in 1890, the luxurious Sackville Hotel was built for the 7th Earl De La Warr and originally included a house for the use of his family. In 1891 George West, Viscount Cantelupe, his eldest surviving son, married Muriel Brassey, the daughter of Sir Thomas and the late Annie, Lady Brassey of Normanhurst Court near Bexhill. The Manor House was fully refurbished so that Lord and Lady Cantelupe could live in style as Lord and Lady of the Manor. Finally, when the 7th Earl De La Warr died in 1896, he transferred control of his Bexhill estate to Viscount Cantelupe.

Viscount Cantelupe became the 8th Earl De La Warr. At this time he organised the building on the sea front of the Kursaal, a pavilion for refined entertainment and relaxation. He also had a bicycle track made, with a cycle chalet, at the eastern end of De La Warr Parade. These amenities were provided to promote the new resort. Meanwhile, many independent schools were being attracted to the expanding town due to its health-giving reputation. The railway came through Bexhill in 1846, the first railway station being a small country halt situated roughly where Sainsbury's car park is today. This was some distance from the village on the hill. A new station, north of Devonshire Square, was opened in 1891 to serve the growing resort. In 1902 the current railway station was opened, and a Bexhill West Station was built for the newly built Crowhurst Branch Line.

1902 was the year that Bexhill became an Incorporated Borough. This was the first Royal Charter granted by Edward VII. Bexhill was the last town in Sussex to be incorporated, and it was the first time a Royal Charter was delivered by motorcar. To celebrate the town's newfound status and to promote the resort, the 8th Earl De La Warr organised the country's first-ever motorcar races along De La Warr Parade in May 1902. The town was scandalised at this time by the divorce of Earl De La Warr.

Muriel had brought the action on the grounds of adultery and abandonment. She was granted a divorce and given custody of their three children. Muriel, with her children, Myra, Avice and Herbrand, went back to live with Earl Brassey at Normanhurst Court. The 8th Earl De La Warr remarried but was again divorced for adultery. He also suffered recurrent and well-publicised financial difficulties. At the start of the First World War in 1914, the Earl bought a Royal Naval commission. He died of fever at Messina in 1915.

Herbrand Edward Dundonald Brassey Sackville became the 9th Earl De La Warr. He is best known for championing the construction of the De La Warr Pavilion, which was built and opened in 1935. The 9th Earl also became Bexhill's first socialist mayor. He died in 1976.

The Second World War caused the evacuation of the schools and substantial bomb damage to the town. The Augusta Victoria College, a girls' finishing school for daughters of high-ranking Nazi officials and German nobility, closed permanently in 1939. Many schools returned to Bexhill after the war, but there was a steady decline in the number of independent schools in the town. The break-up of the British Empire and in particular the Independence of India in 1947 hastened the process. Most of the schools were boarding and catered largely for the children of the armed forces overseas and of the colonial administration. Although the number of schools decreased, many of the parents and former pupils had fond memories of the town and later retired to Bexhill.

== Governance ==
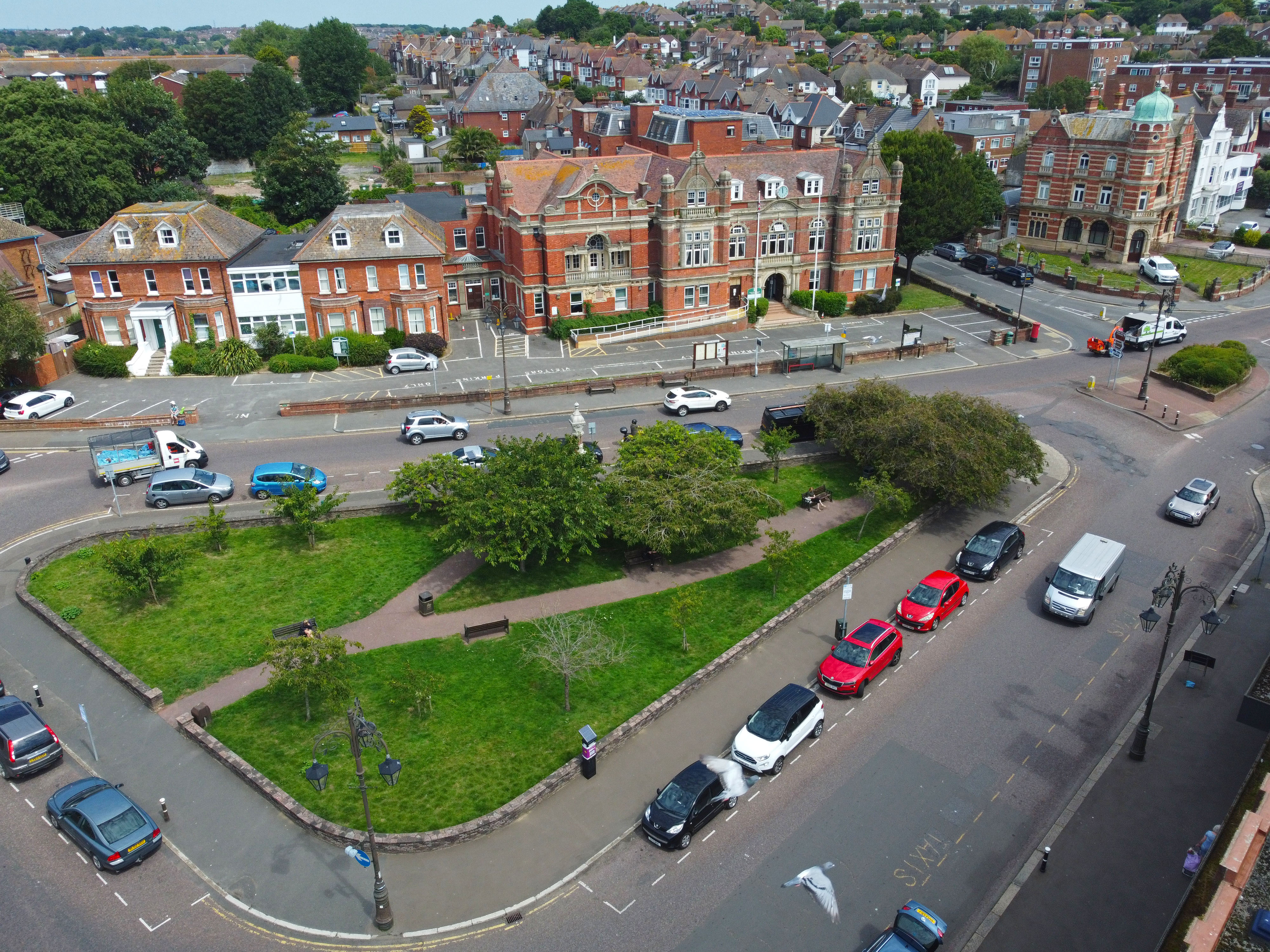
Town Hall Square

Due to local governance reform in 1974, Bexhill became part of Rother District Council, thereby losing its town council. In its place, Bexhill became a charter trustees town, represented by the Bexhill councillors of Rother District Council. A quarterly forum is held to provide a voice to the community at a local level.

Bexhill Town Hall is the seat of Rother District Council, for which elections are held every four years. In total, thirty-eight councillors are elected for Rother, eighteen coming from Bexhill's nine wards.

In 2017, local campaigners initiated a public consultation on the issue of regaining a town council for Bexhill. 9,227 people participated in the consultation, of whom 93.5% expressed a preference for a town council. The consultation was non-binding and, at a meeting in December 2017, Rother District Councillors voted against the formation of such a council by 18 to 13. The meeting was fully attended. Those who voted against the consultation's outcome mostly expressed concerns about the added burden to local taxpayers that a town council would bring. On 1 April 2021 a civil parish was formed.

At the local elections in May 2013, the Conservatives had a net loss of fifteen seats, leaving the Rother District Council composed of fourteen Conservatives, thirteen independents, seven Liberal Democrats, one Green, and three Labour councillors. The changes have meant that the issue of a town council for Bexhill has been reopened. The independents, supported by Labour and others, assented to a motion that would have a Bexhill Town Council up and running by 2021.

Above Rother, the next level of government is the East Sussex County Council, with responsibility for education, libraries, social services, highways, civil registration, trading standards, and transport. Elections to the County Council are also held every four years. For these elections, Bexhill is divided into four divisions: North, East, South and West.

The latest county council election was held on 4 May 2017. Following the result of a by-election in 2019, Bexhill has two independent and two Conservative county councillors.

The parliamentary constituency of Bexhill and Battle, created in 1983, includes the nearby town of Battle. Its Member of Parliament was Charles Wardle until the 2001 election, when he left the Conservatives and was replaced by Gregory Barker. He was the Member until the 2015 General Election, when he was replaced by Huw Merriman, re-elected in 2019. Merriman stood down for the 2024 general election, when he was replaced by the Conservative Kieran Mullan.

At the European level, Bexhill was part of the South-East England constituency, which had ten seats in the European Parliament. The 2019 election returned four Brexit Party MEPs, three Liberal Democrat, one Labour, one Conservative and one Green. They ceased to hold office when the country left the EU.

As with most other areas along the South Coast, in the 2016 referendum the Rother district voted heavily to leave the EU. Leave won in Rother by a margin of 58.5% to 41.5%.

=== Wards ===
Ward	Location	Population	Ward	Location	Population
Central		5,607	Sackville		4,898
Collington		4,180	Kewhurst		4,735
St Stephens		4,776	OldTown & Worsham		4,178
Pebsham & St Michaels		5,113	Sidley		6,118
St Marks		4,967			

== Landmarks ==
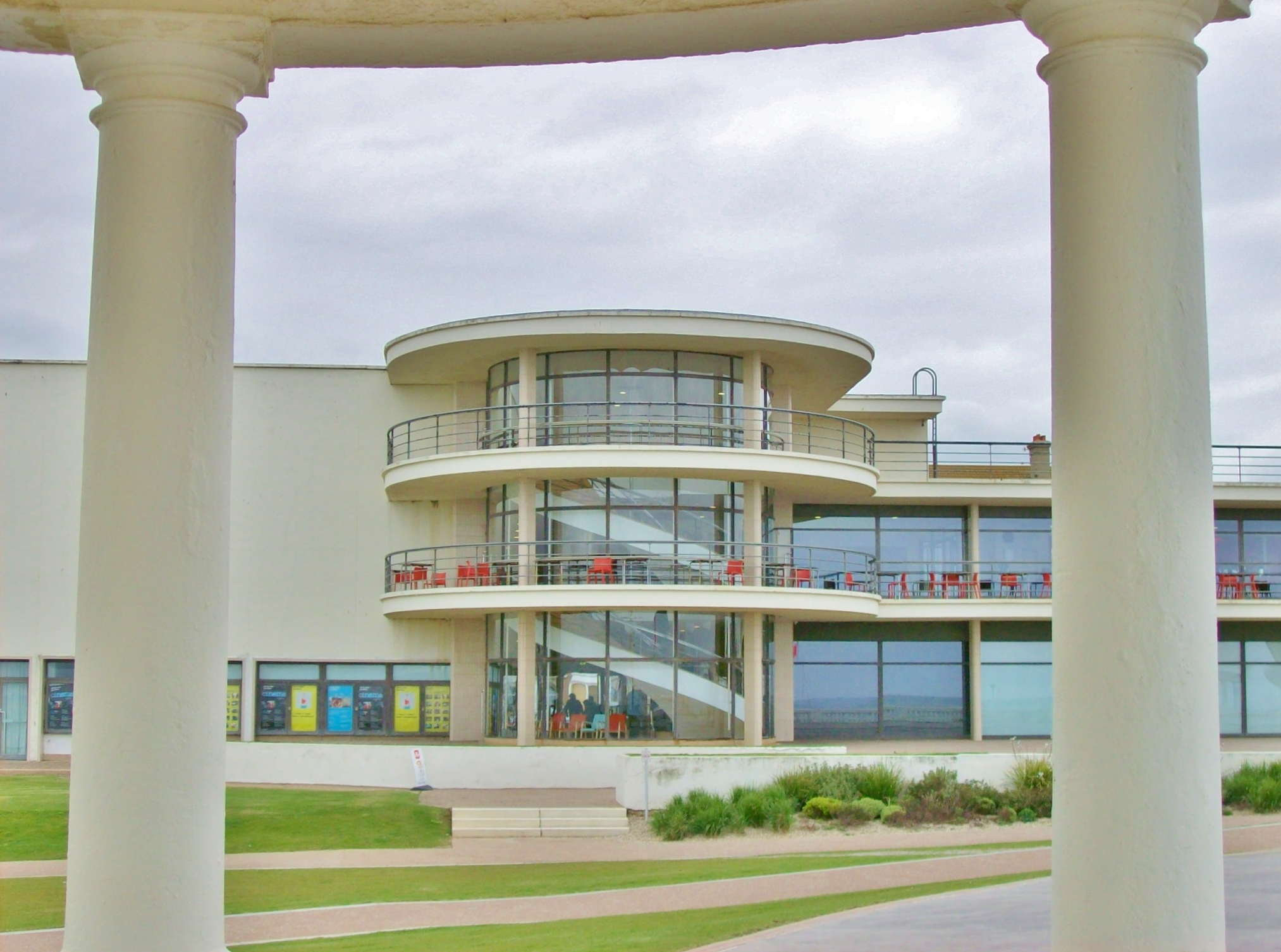
De La Warr Pavilion from promenade

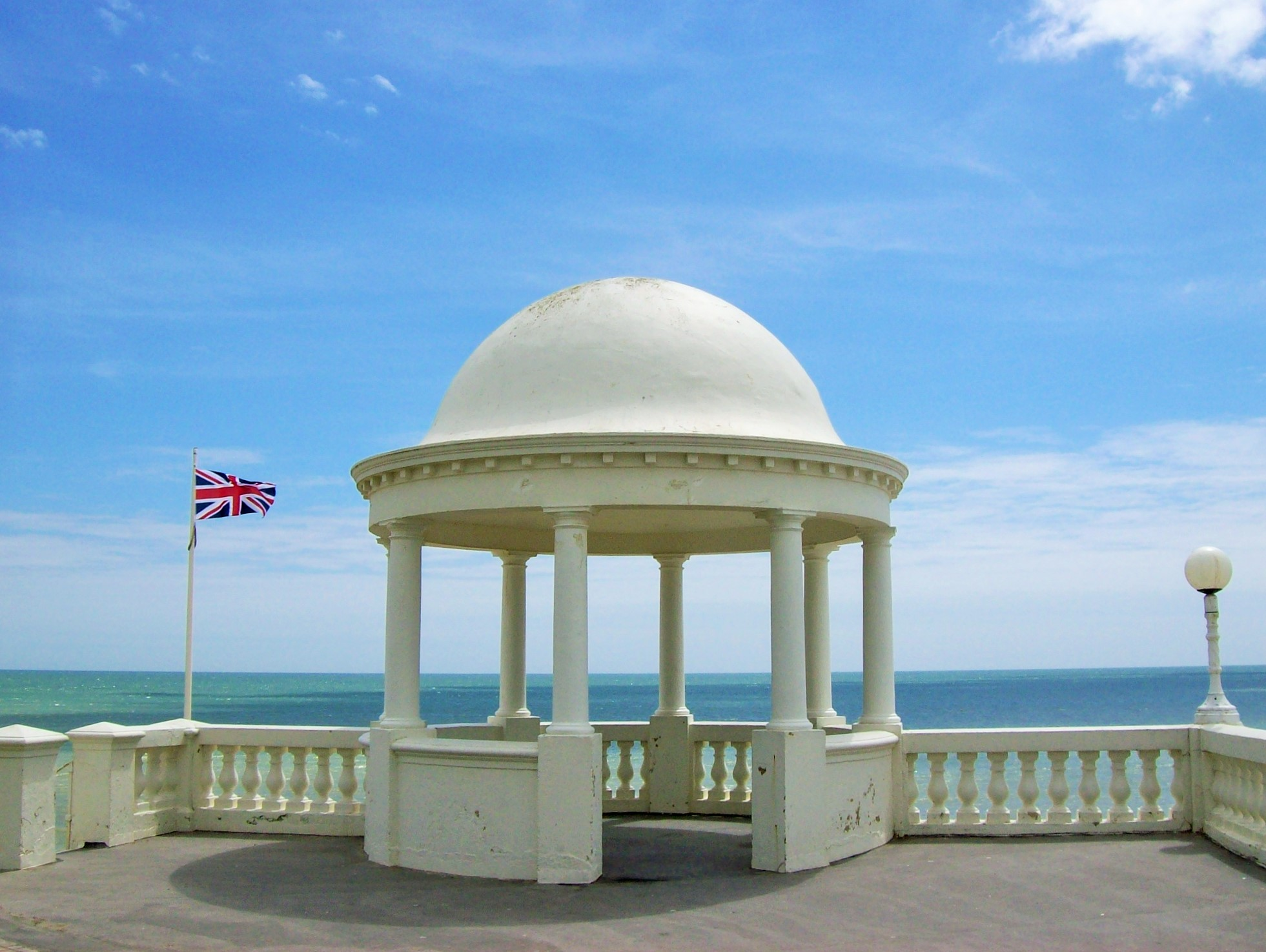
One of the two gazebos at The Colonnade

The most notable landmark in Bexhill-on-Sea is the De La Warr Pavilion. The De La Warr Pavilion is a Grade I listed building, located on the seafront at Bexhill-on-Sea. The seafront building was the result of an architectural competition initiated by Herbrand Sackville, 9th Earl De La Warr, after whom the building was named.

The 9th Earl, a committed socialist and Mayor of Bexhill, persuaded Bexhill council to develop the site as a public building. The competition was announced in the Architects' Journal in February 1934, with a programme that specified an entertainment hall to seat at least 1500 people; a 200-seat restaurant; a reading room; and a lounge. Initially, the budget for the project was limited to £50,000, although this was later raised to £80,000. Run by the Royal Institute of British Architects, this competition attracted over 230 entrants, many of them practising in the Modernist style. Shapes tend towards streamlined, industrially-influenced designs. The architects selected for the project, Erich Mendelsohn and Serge Chermayeff, were leading figures in the Modern Movement.

The aesthetics employed in the International Style proved especially suited to the building, tending towards streamlined, industrially-influenced designs, often with expansive metal-framed windows, and eschewing traditional brick and stonework in favour of concrete and steel construction. Among the building's most innovative features was its use of a welded steel frame construction, pioneered by structural engineer Felix Samuely. Construction of the De La Warr Pavilion began in January 1935.

The building was opened on 12 December of the same year by the Duke and Duchess of York (later King George VI and Queen Elizabeth). During World War II, the De La Warr Pavilion was used by the military. Bexhill and Sussex in general were vulnerable if the Germans decided to mount an invasion (Operation Sea Lion). Among those who served at the Pavilion during the War was Spike Milligan, later a noted comedian. The building suffered minor damage to its foundations when the Metropole Hotel adjacent to the building's western side was destroyed by German bombers.

After the war, management of the Pavilion was taken over by Bexhill Corporation (which later became Rother District Council). Changes were made to the building, many of which were inconsistent with the original design and aesthetic of the building. Lack of funds also resulted in an ongoing degradation of the building's fabric.

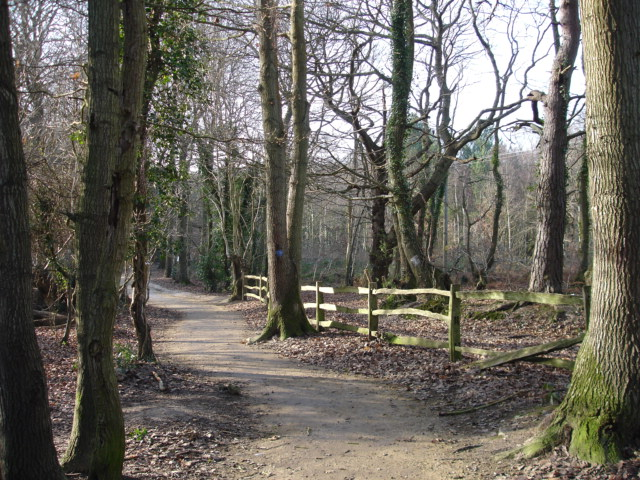
High Woods, Little Common, Bexhill-on-Sea

In 1986, the De La Warr Pavilion was granted a Grade I listed building status, essentially protecting the building from further inappropriate alteration. 1989 saw the formation of the Pavilion Trust, a group dedicated to protecting and restoring the building.

Playwright David Hare suggested that the site be used as an art gallery as opposed to an expected privatised redevelopment. In 2002, after a long application process, the De La Warr Pavilion was granted £6 million by the Heritage Lottery Fund and the Arts Council, to restore the building and turn it into a contemporary arts centre. Work began in 2004 on the De La Warr Pavilion's regeneration and a transfer of the building's ownership from Rother District Council to the De La Warr Pavilion Charitable Trust.

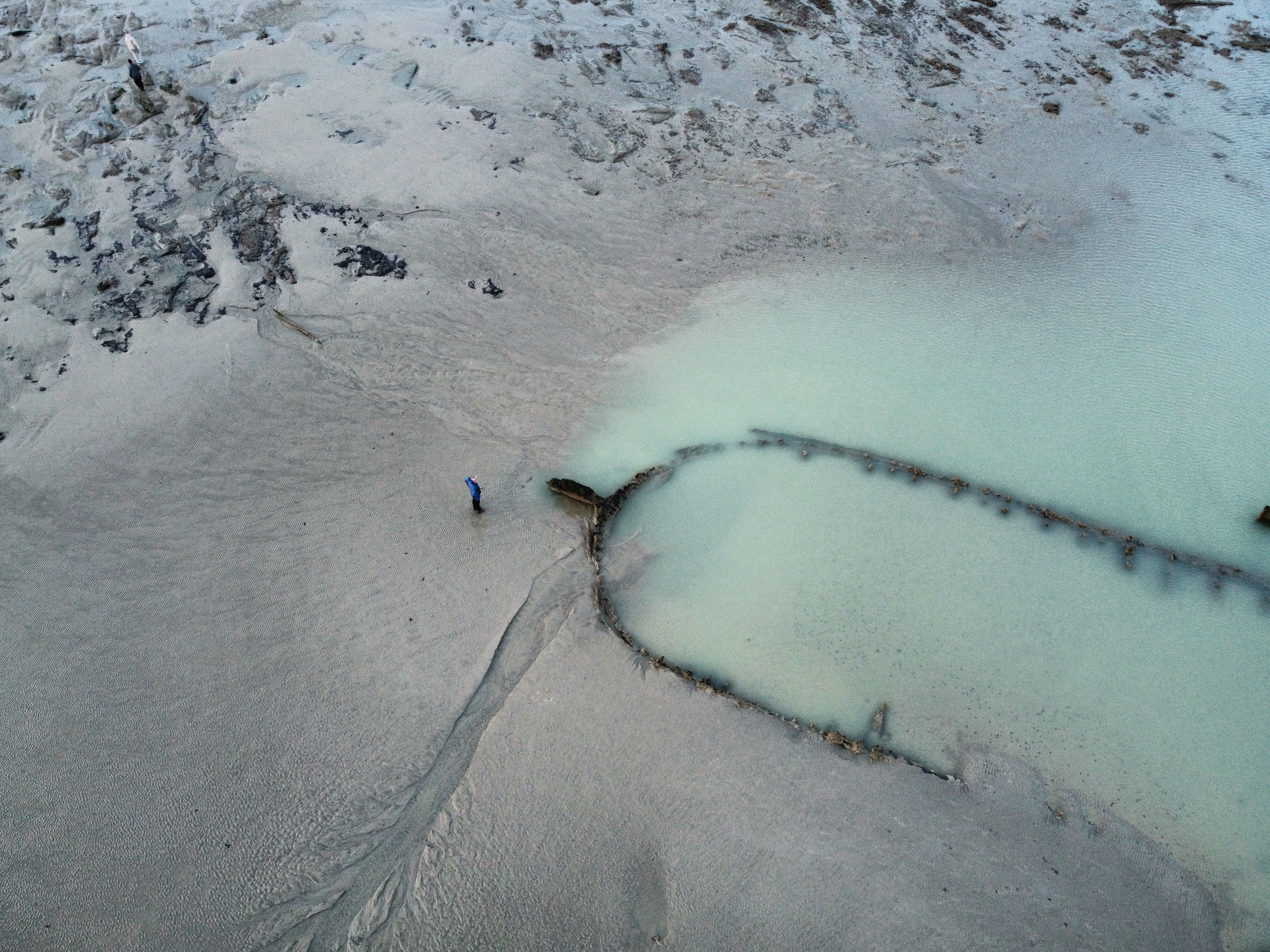
Wreck of the VOC Amsterdam, visible at low tide between Bexhill-on-Sea and St Leonards-on-Sea

In 2005, after an extensive programme of restoration and regeneration, the De La Warr Pavilion reopened as a contemporary arts centre, encompassing one of the largest galleries on the south coast of England. A small collection of archival materials related to the De La Warr Pavilion is collected in the Serge Chermayeff Papers held by the Avery Architectural and Fine Arts Library at Columbia University in New York City. The Art Deco and International Style building was designed by the architects Erich Mendelsohn and Serge Chermayeff and constructed in 1935. Although sometimes claimed to be the first major Modernist public building in Britain, it was in fact preceded by some months by the Dutch-influenced Hornsey Town Hall.

A Site of Special Scientific Interest lies within the Bexhill district—High Woods. It is of biological importance because it is the only known sessile oak Quercus petraea woodland in East Sussex. Fossils are also commonly found in Bexhill. In 2009, the world's oldest spider web was found encased in amber in the town. It was 140 million years old.

In June 2011 it was reported that the world's smallest dinosaur had been discovered at Ashdown Brickworks near the town. A single vertebra was found. Beeches Farm is a Grade II listed building.

The wreck of the VOC Amsterdam, an eighteenth-century cargo ship that ran aground between Bexhill and St Leonards, can be seen at low tide.

== Areas ==
Central ward
The main part of Bexhill. There are several roads with a variety of shops, a railway station, a library and the De La Warr Pavilion on the seafront.:

Old Town
The original town on the hill, chartered by King Offa in 772.

Sidley
Residential area to the north, with its own high street.

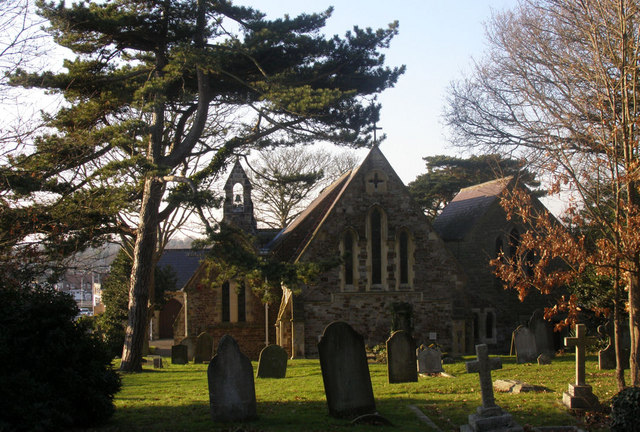
St Mark's Church, Little Common

Pebsham
A developing residential area to the east of town.

Glyne Gap
Easterly low-lying land separating Bexhill from Hastings; its most prominent feature is Ravenside Retail & Leisure Park.

Collington
A residential area near Cooden.

Little Common
A small village to the west, with various independent shops.

Cooden
In the south-west, plays host to a large hotel, golf and tennis clubs.

The Highlands
A small suburb at the town's highest elevation. Bordered by Turkey Road, Ninfield Road and Bexhill Cemetery.

Barnhorn
An area far west of Bexhill; its name survives in Barnhorne Manor and Barnhorn Road (a section of the A259). The name was recorded in AD 772 in an Anglo-Saxon charter as Berna horna. A new residential development site called Barnhorn Green sets to grow this area significantly.

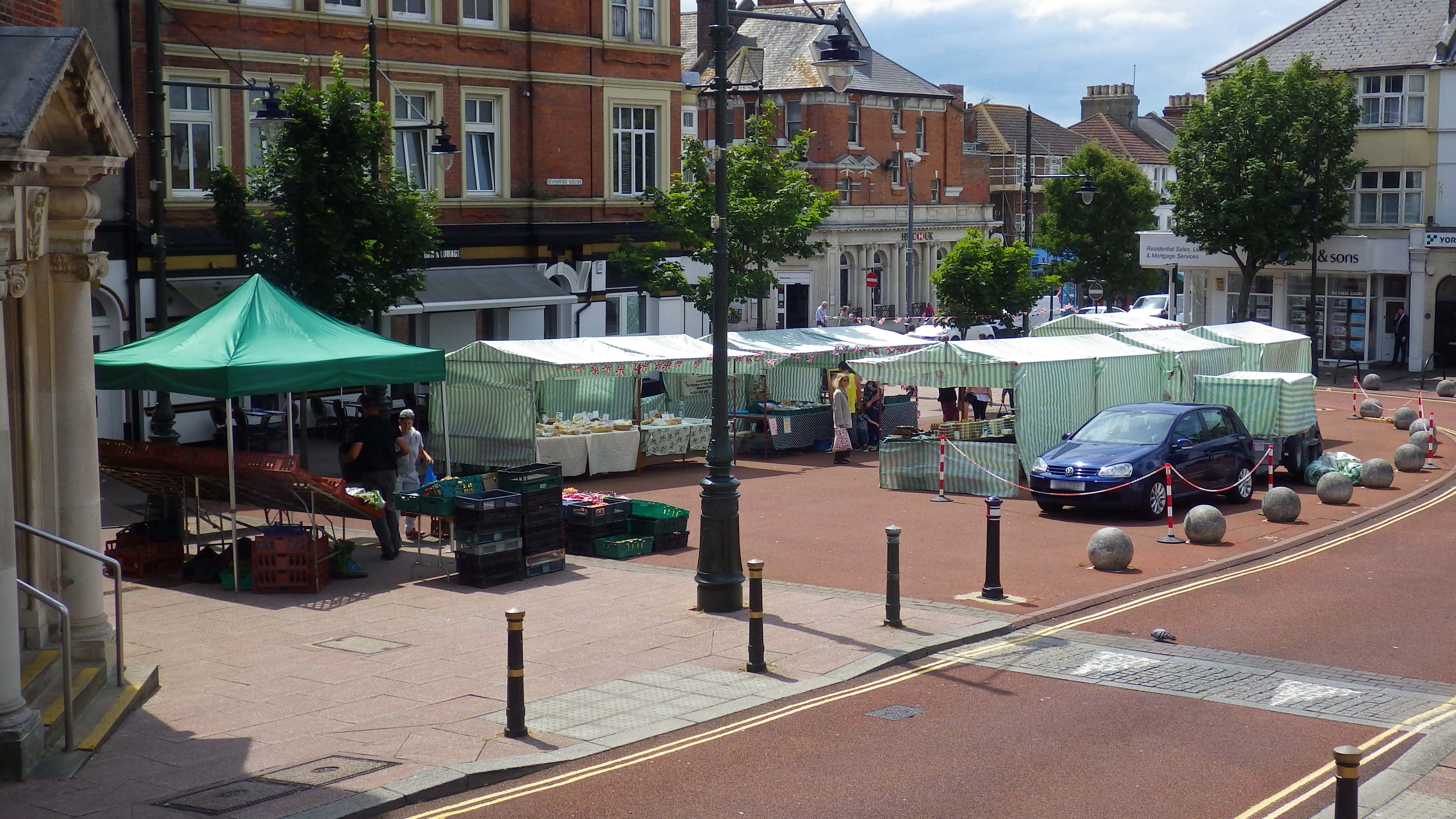
Bexhill Farmers' Market, Devonshire Square

Normans Bay
A rural fishing hamlet furthest west close to Pevensey Levels.

== Economy ==
Reginald Sackville, seventh Earl De La Warr, decided to transform what was then a village on a hill around its church into an exclusive seaside resort, which he named Bexhill-on-Sea. He was instrumental in building a sea wall south of the village, and the road above it was then named De La Warr Parade. Large houses were built inland from there, and the new town began.

In 1890, the luxurious Sackville Hotel was built.

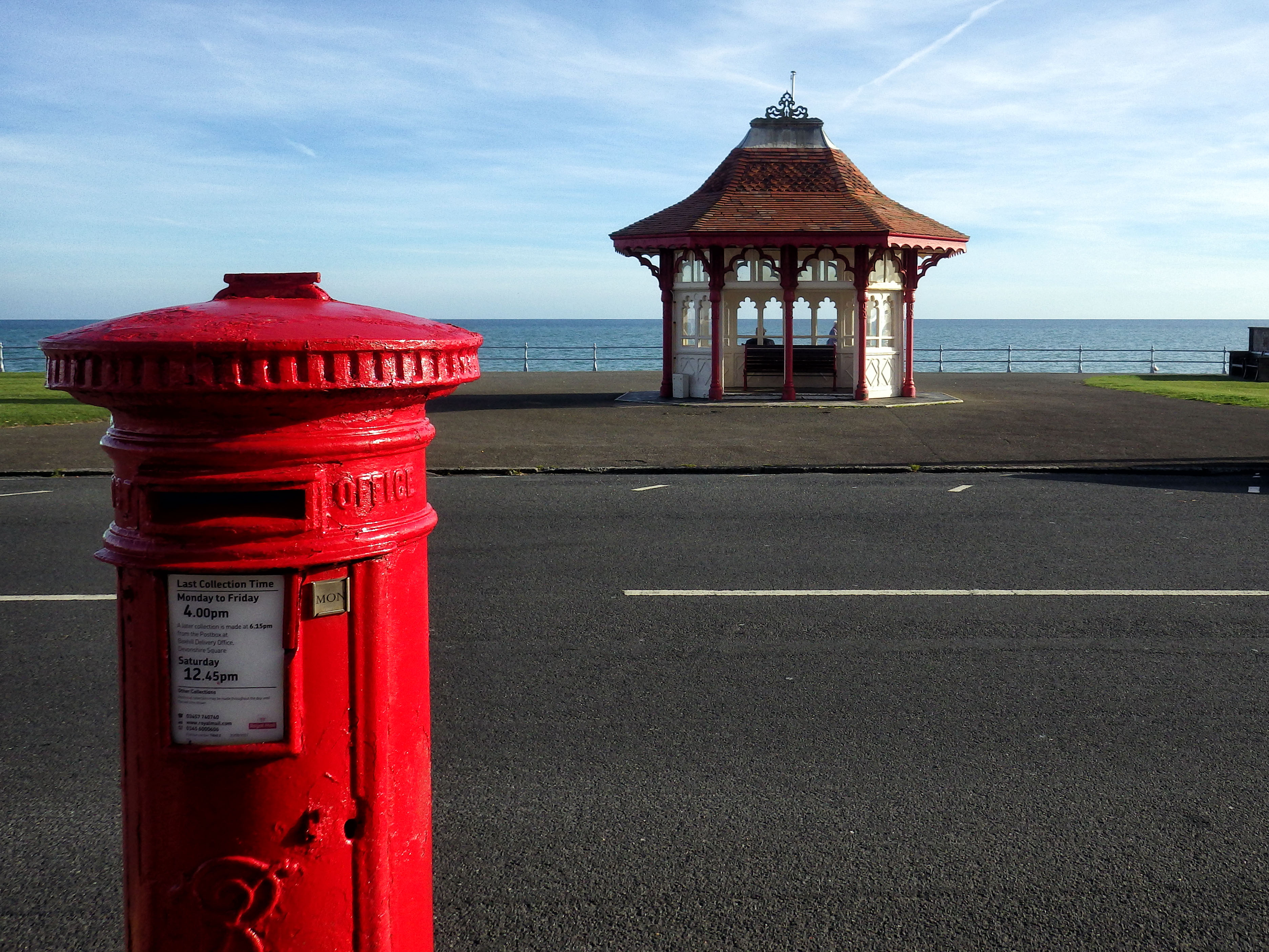
Victorian influences still alive today

Bexhill was the location for the first motor race in the United Kingdom, in May 1902. Signs at the town's outskirts have the text "Birthplace of British Motor Racing" appended below the town's name. The Bexhill 100 Festival of Motoring, held on Bexhill's seafront, celebrated this important milestone in motoring history from 1990 until 2002. This final festival commemorated the Centenary of the original "Races". During the life of the festival, in 1999, the organisers launched the Bexhill 100 Motoring Club, so although the Festival no longer exists, the club still exists, and their committee organises the Bexhill 100 Motoring Club Classic Car Show annually, held on August bank holiday Monday in the Polegrove, Bexhill.

The De La Warr Pavilion, brainchild of the ninth Earl De La Warr, opened in 1935 as one of the earliest examples of Modern architecture in a major British public building. It closed for major restoration work in December 2003 and reopened in October 2005.

During the Second World War, Bexhill was named as a point to attack as part of Operation Sea Lion by Nazi Germany.

The town, like many other English seaside resorts, is now much more a settled community. Although there is a small entertainment area on the seafront, it now has a large retired population, like much of the south coast. Efforts are being made to increase tourism in Bexhill, including annual events such as the 'Festival of the Sea' and, formerly, 'Roaring Twenties Day', each held during the summer.

The last remaining cinema was sold to the Wetherspoon pub chain on 1 December 2014.

== Transport ==
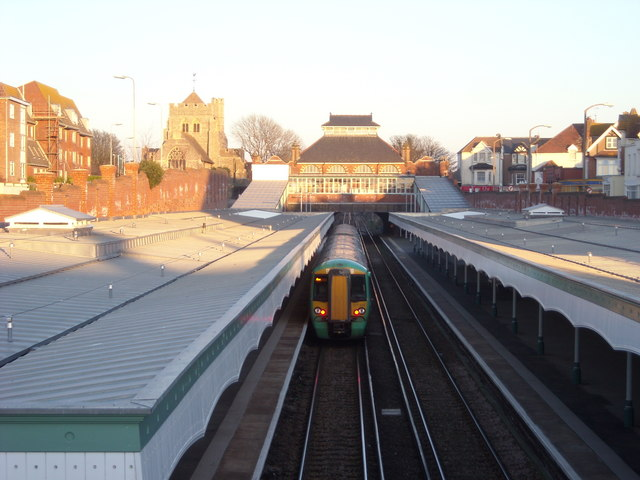
Bexhill railway station

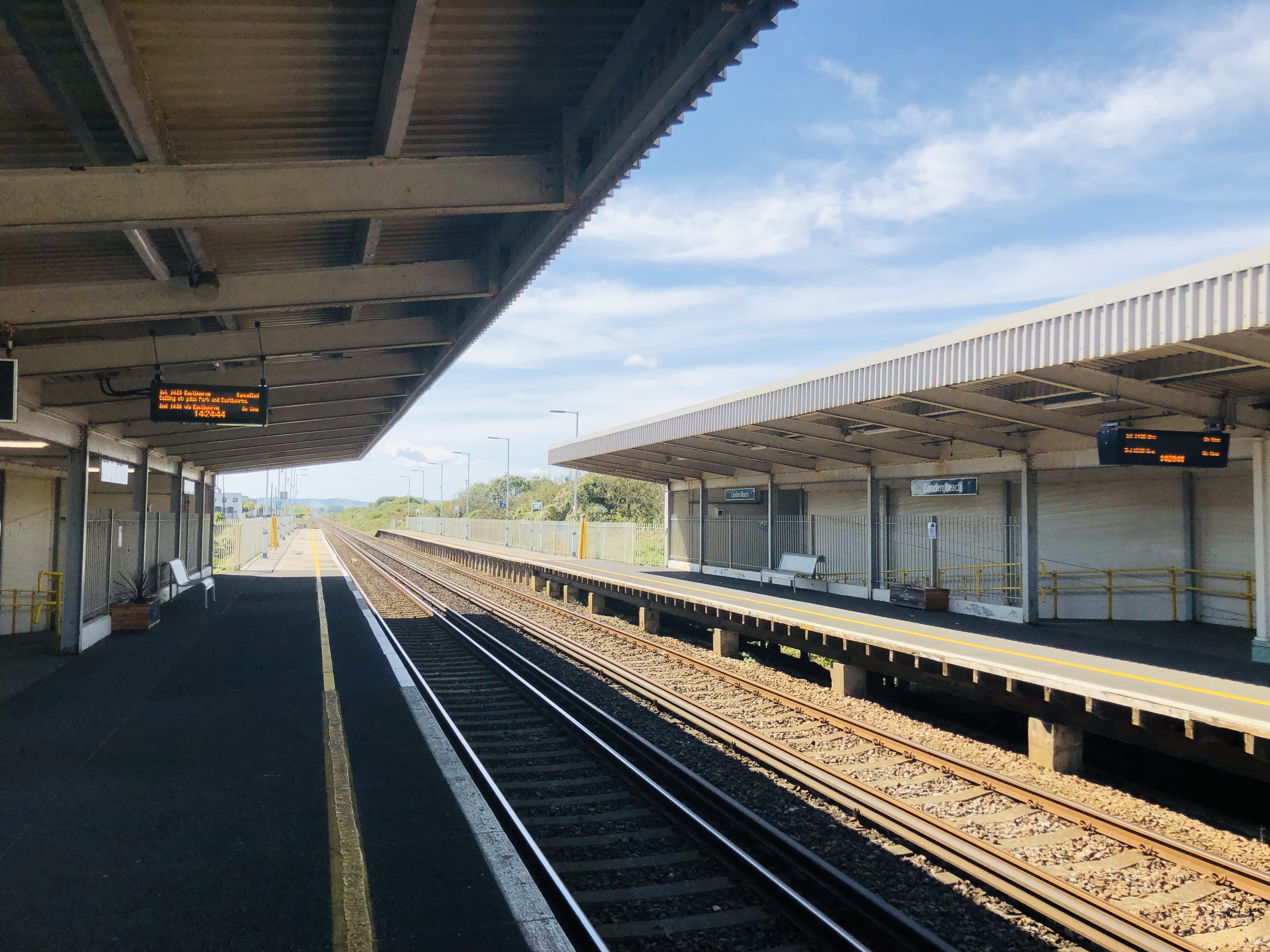
Cooden Beach railway station, Bexhill

Bexhill is on the A259 road which forms the coast road between Folkestone and Brighton. Plans of an A259 Bexhill and Hastings bypass have repeatedly been postponed over the past 40 years, but the plans were cancelled due to environmental concerns. A new road was approved in 2012 and completed in 2016 at a cost of £100m.

The town is served by the coastal railway line between Ashford and Brighton and has three railway stations, including Cooden Beach, Collington, and Bexhill. Regular trains run to Ashford, Brighton and London Victoria.

Bexhill is served by 13 bus routes, including school routes which serve the surrounding areas like Hastings, Battle, Conquest Hospital, Eastbourne and Pevensey Bay Asda (Free bus on Wednesdays). The area with the most bus services is between Sidley and Bexhill, which has routes 2 (Asda free bus), 95, 97 & 98.

The railway built by the Brighton, Lewes and Hastings Railway (later part of the London, Brighton & South Coast Railway) arrived on 27 June 1846, although the present station was not built until 1891, when the town had become popular as a resort. A second line, this time built by the South Eastern Railway and approaching the town from the north, was a branch line from Crowhurst via an intermediate station at Sidley to a terminus at Bexhill West. The line opened on 1 June 1902 and closed on 15 June 1964. The branch was also closed temporarily between 1 January 1917 and 1 March 1919 as an economy measure during the First World War.

== Sport and leisure ==
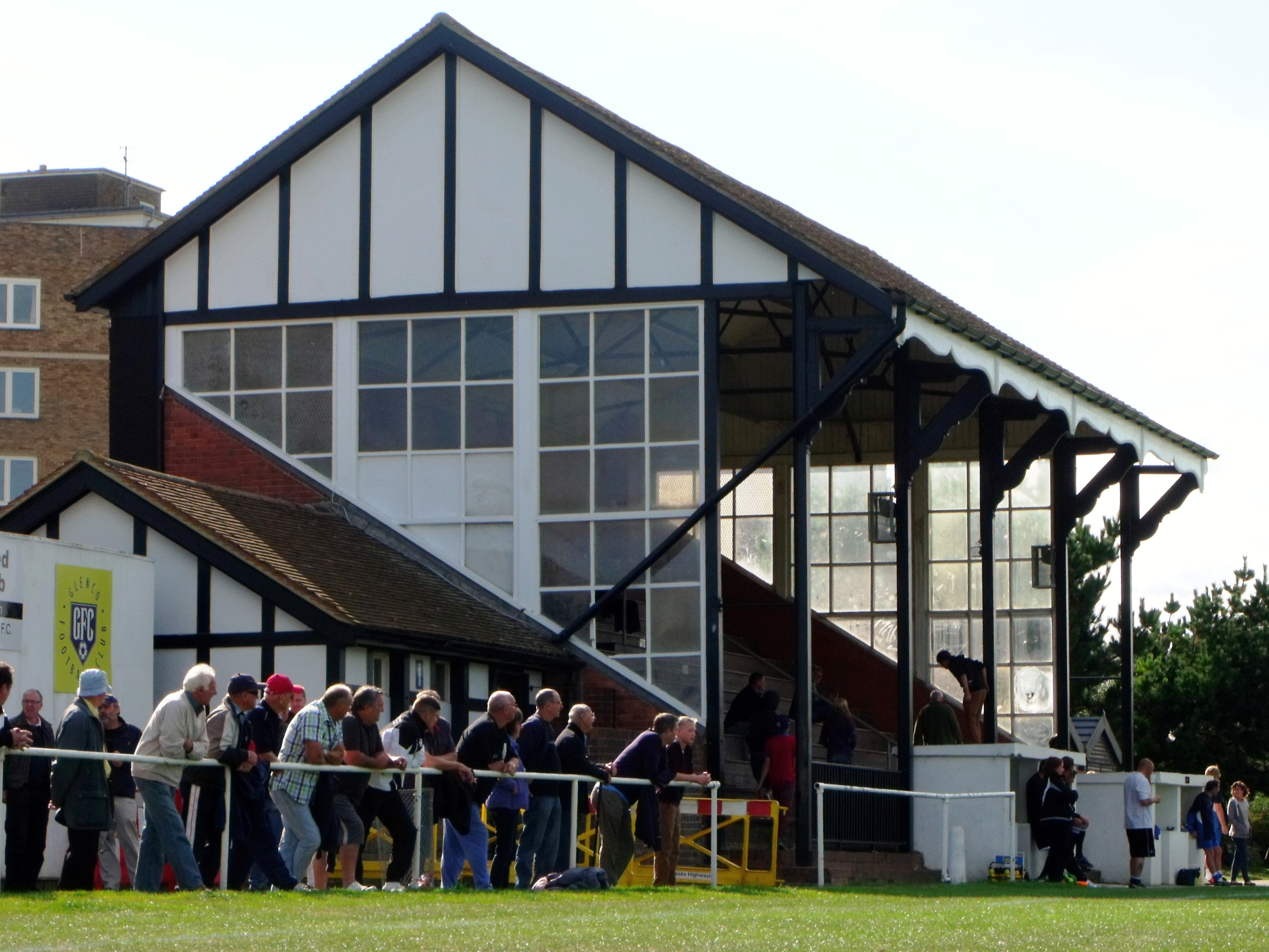
Sports stand at Polegrove recreation ground

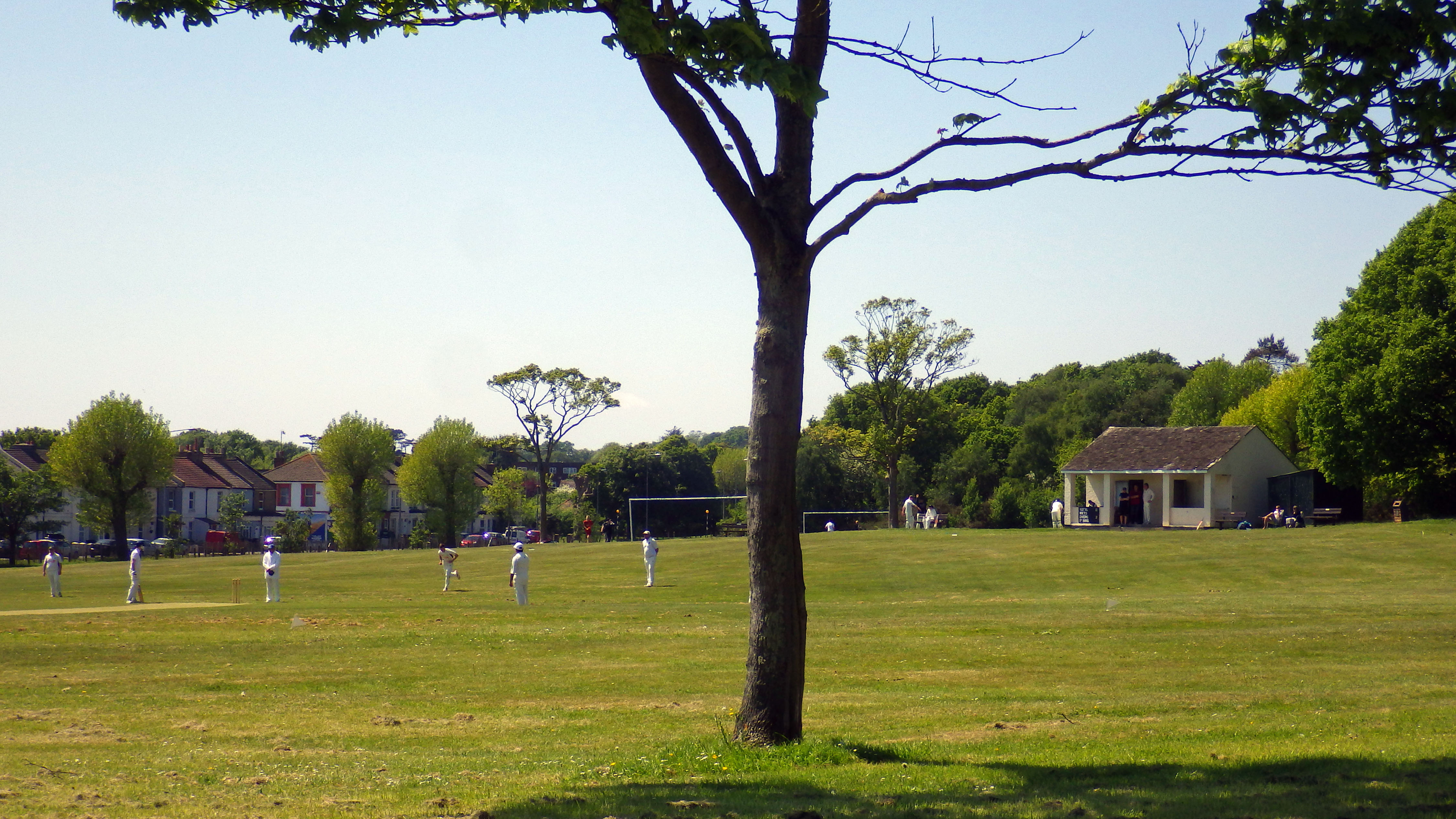
Cricket pitch, Bexhill Down

Bexhill has three non-league football clubs: Bexhill United F.C., who play at The Polegrove, and Little Common F.C., who play at Little Common Recreation Ground, both in the Southern Combination Premier Division, in the 9th tier of English football; and Sidley United F.C., who play at Hooe Recreation Ground in Hooe, in the East Sussex Premier Division, in the 12th tier of English football.

Bexhill United share The Polegrove with Bexhill Cricket Club, whose 1st XI play in the Sussex Cricket League Division 3 East. Other cricket teams in the area include Bexhill Strikers C.C., at Bexhill Down; Sidley C.C., at St Mary's Recreation Ground; and Little Common Ramblers C.C., at Little Common Recreation Ground. The 'Ramblers' have 3 adult teams playing in the East Sussex Cricket League. In 2018, the Ramblers 1st XI was promoted to the Sussex County League for the first time in its history.

Bexhill has a rugby union club, Hastings & Bexhill R.F.C., which is shared with neighbouring Hastings. They play at ARK William Parker Academy.

Bexhill-on-Sea Golf Club (now defunct) was founded in 1890. It closed at the time of WW2.

Bexhill-on-Sea also has a sports and social club – Bexhill Amateur Athletic Community Association. This club is located on Little Common Road, and also has a football club, judo and Keepfit classes, and a fully equipped gym.

Bexhill is home to a detachment of the Sussex Army Cadet Force, a volunteer youth organisation, sponsored by the Ministry of Defence, which accepts cadets aged between 12 and 18 years of age.

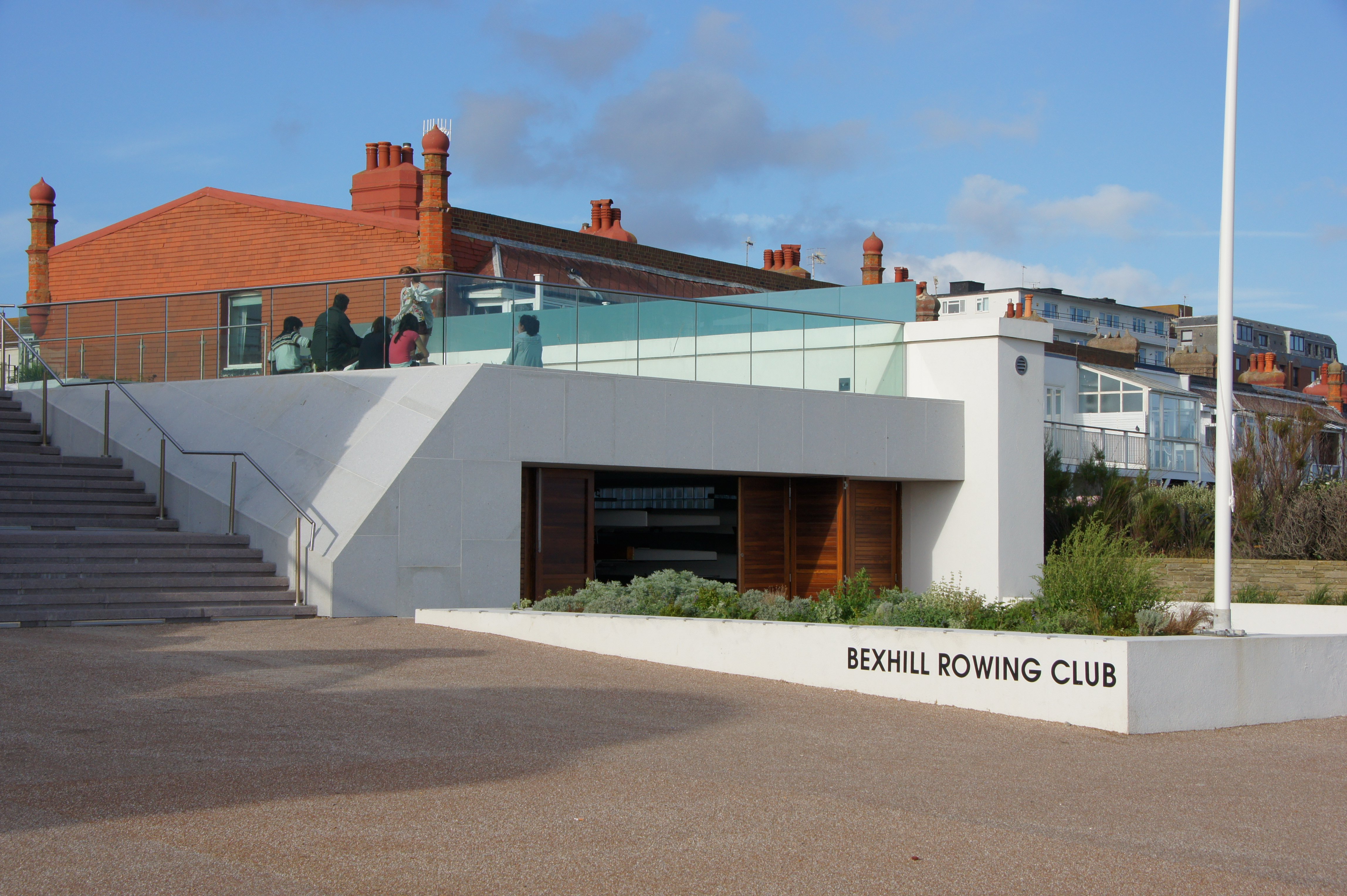
Bexhill Rowing Club boathouse

Bexhill-on-Sea is also the home of Rother Swim Academy, offering swimming lessons to children. Founded in 1990, it is family-run.

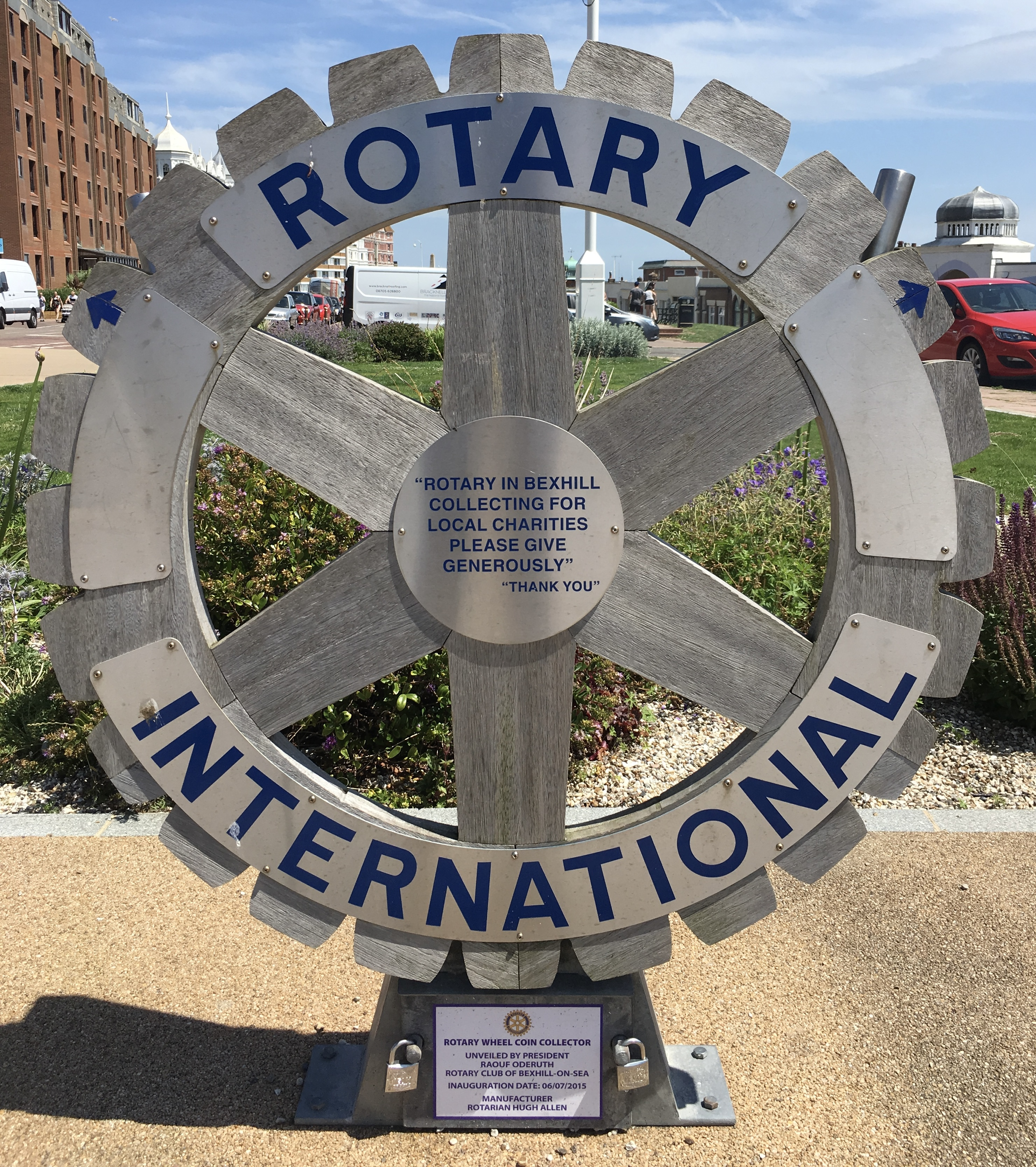
Rotary Club of Bexhill Coin Collector

Marina Court Garden officially opened on 6 July 2015 with the Bexhill Rotary Club Wheel coin collector (Bexhill Observer). The open space on the Marina, next to the De la Warr Pavilion, will provide an area to sit and relax. Rother District Council Chairman opened the Garden, and President Raouf Oderuth of Bexhill Rotary Club unveiled the Coin Collector. The proceeds will fund local nominated Charities.

== Culture ==
In 2013, the BBC conducted a survey into 'Englishness'. The results of this survey for the Rother area, in which Bexhill is found, revealed that 68% of people living in Rother were 'proud to be English' – 11% above the national average of 57%.

Bexhill also holds the world record for the greatest number of mermaids in one area (325), a feat achieved in September 2017 at the annual 'Festival of the Sea'. The town also held the record for the largest Charleston dance, which took place as part of the 'Bexhill Roaring 20s' festival, formerly held every summer, though it was overtaken by Shrewsbury in 2018.

== Climate ==
As with the rest of the British Isles and Southern England, Bexhill experiences a maritime climate with cool summers and mild winters. In terms of the local climate, Bexhill is on the eastern edge of what is, on average, the sunniest part of the UK, the stretch of coast from the Isle of Wight to the Hastings area.

Climate data for Hastings 1981–2010, extremes 1960–
Month	Jan	Feb	Mar	Apr	May	Jun	Jul	Aug	Sep	Oct	Nov	Dec	Year
Record high °C (°F)	15.0 (59.0)	14.0 (57.2)	19.0 (66.2)	24.4 (75.9)	26.1 (79.0)	32.3 (90.1)	33.2 (91.8)	31.5 (88.7)	27.2 (81.0)	22.2 (72.0)	17.2 (63.0)	14.5 (58.1)	33.2 (91.8)
Mean daily maximum °C (°F)	7.7 (45.9)	7.6 (45.7)	9.9 (49.8)	12.6 (54.7)	15.9 (60.6)	18.5 (65.3)	20.7 (69.3)	21.0 (69.8)	18.7 (65.7)	15.2 (59.4)	11.3 (52.3)	8.4 (47.1)	14.0 (57.1)
Mean daily minimum °C (°F)	3.1 (37.6)	2.7 (36.9)	4.2 (39.6)	5.9 (42.6)	9.1 (48.4)	11.7 (53.1)	14.0 (57.2)	14.2 (57.6)	12.3 (54.1)	9.6 (49.3)	6.1 (43.0)	3.8 (38.8)	8.1 (46.5)
Record low °C (°F)	−9.8 (14.4)	−8.8 (16.2)	−6.1 (21.0)	−2.1 (28.2)	0.0 (32.0)	2.8 (37.0)	6.7 (44.1)	7.4 (45.3)	4.4 (39.9)	0.2 (32.4)	−5.6 (21.9)	−6.7 (19.9)	−9.8 (14.4)
Average precipitation mm (inches)	75 (3.0)	52 (2.0)	53 (2.1)	48 (1.9)	48 (1.9)	50 (2.0)	49 (1.9)	52 (2.0)	60 (2.4)	96 (3.8)	87 (3.4)	61 (2.4)	731 (28.8)
Mean monthly sunshine hours	72	90	127	196	230	232	247	235	168	128	85	61	1,871
Source 1: Royal Dutch Meteorological Institute
Source 2: Met Office

== Notable people ==
- June Dalziel Almeida (1930–2007), a Scottish virologist, died in Bexhill
- Hertha Marks Ayrton, engineer, mathematician, physicist, and inventor who was awarded the Hughes Medal by the Royal Society for her work on electric arcs and ripples in sand and water.
- John Logie Baird, (1888-1946), Scottish inventor of television, resided in a house by the station towards the end of his life.
- James Beeching (1788–1858), shipbuilder and inventor of the self-righting lifeboat.
- Joyce Lankester Brisley (1896–1978), writer of the Milly-Molly-Mandy stories, etc. – exact place of birth unidentified.
- Georgina Fanny Cheffins (1863–1932), militant suffragette, lived here in her later years.
- Michael Cowpland, founder of high-tech companies Mitel, Corel, and ZIM, lived in Bexhill and went to Bexhill College until he was 18.
- Fanny Cradock and Johnnie Cradock, chef-broadcasters, lived in Cooden Drive, Bexhill.
- Max Faulkner, professional golfer and Open champion in 1951.
- Norman Franks, aviation historian and author of over 120 books on military aviation.
- William Kelsey Fry (1889-1963), dental and plastic surgeon.
- Ruth Gipps, composer and music impresario, founder of London Repertoire Orchestra.
- Jimmy Glover (1861–1931), an Irish composer and conductor, was Mayor of Bexhill-on-Sea for 1906–07.
- Sir David Hare (born 1947), British dramatist.
- Peter Katin, (1930–2015) concert pianist, recitalist, chamber musician, and concerto soloist, made Bexhill his home.
- Henry Richard Kenwood, public health specialist, born here.
- Sir Philip Ledger (1937–2012), classical musician, choral composer and scholar, was born in Bexhill.
- Desmond Llewelyn, the James Bond actor who played Q, lived in the town until his death in 1999.
- Ted Lowe, commentator on BBC's 'Pot Black', which brought snooker to prominence on British TV, was a longtime resident of Bexhill until his death in May 2011.
- Kate Marsden (1859–1931), nurse who travelled through Siberia helping Yakut lepers, lived in Bexhill in the 1910s and became a founder of Bexhill Museum.
- Spike Milligan (1918-2002) was stationed in Bexhill while in the army during the Second World War, and most of the first volume of his war memoirs takes place there.
- Hayley Okines (1997–2015), patient with the rare premature ageing disease progeria.
- Jimmy Robertson (born 1986), professional snooker player, was born in Bexhill.
- Andrew Sachs (1930–2016), actor, had his stage début in 1947 at the De La Warr Pavilion, where he also worked as an assistant stage manager.
- Alex Saunders (1926–1988), the founder of Alexandrian Witchcraft lived in the Old Town at 1 Chantry Cottage.
- Ronald Skirth (1897–1977), conscientious objector and author of the First World War memoir The Reluctant Tommy, grew up in Bexhill and describes it at length in his book.
- Eric Slater (1896–1963), English artist and printmaker, lived in Bexhill and created images of the surrounding countryside.
- Gwyneth Strong, the Only Fools and Horses actress who played Cassandra Trotter lives in Bexhill.
- Oli Thompson, strongman and 2006 winner of Britain's Strongest Man.
- Leslie Weatherhead, preacher and theologian, retired to Bexhill.
- Hugh Williams (1904–1969), actor, playwright and dramatist.
- Angus Wilson (1913–1991), novelist, short story writer and campaigner for homosexual equality. He was born in Bexhill, lived in Dorset Road and Marina Court, and attended kindergarten in the town before his family moved to Eastbourne.

== Freedom of the Town ==
The following people and military units have received the Freedom of the Town of Bexhill-on-Sea.

=== Individuals ===
- The Rt. Hon. Lord Brassey: 28 October 1907.
- John Alexander Paton: 29 March 1920.
- William Nicolson Cuthbert: 25 January 1943.
- Christina Isabella Meads: 5 March 1952.
- Ernest William Cantley Bowrey: 5 March 1952.
- Richard Cecil Sewell: 5 March 1952.
- Frances Henrietta Burrows: 29 January 1958.
- Claude Pycroft: 27 September 1962.
- Joyce Oliver Alexander: 2 October 1968.
- Harry Riley: 2 October 1968.
- Ian James Allen: 29 July 2009.
- Matthew Richard Hellier: 29 July 2009.
- Nicholas Patrick McCorry: 29 July 2009.
- Phil James McCorry: 29 July 2009.
- Stuart Earl: 13 October 2019.
- Margaret Jones: 4 March 2020.
- Christopher Ashford: 4 March 2020.
- Alexis Markwick: 11 May 2022.
- Christopher Speck: 8 March 2023.
- James Carroll: 6 March 2024.
- Lynn Langlands: 26 March 2025.

== See also ==
- List of places of worship in Rother
- St Richard's Catholic College
- Bexhill High Academy
- Bexhill College
- Listed buildings in Bexhill-on-Sea
