= Sidley, East Sussex =

Village in East Sussex, England

Coordinates: 50.86°N 0.47°E

Sidley
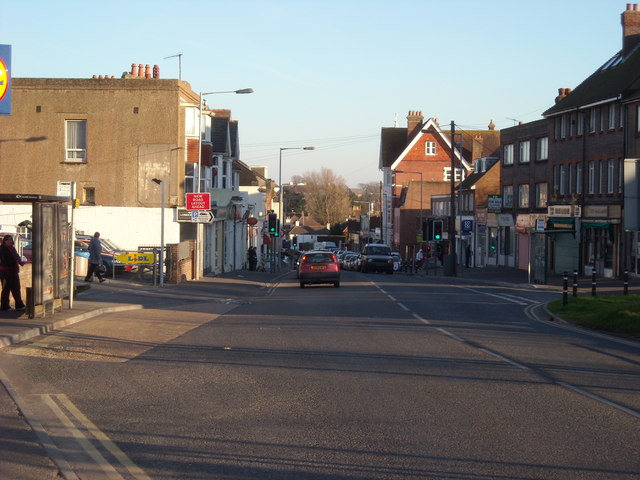

- Location within East Sussex
- Area: 21.0 km^{2} (8.1 sq mi)
- Population: 6,118 (Ward-2021)
  - Density: 291/km^{2} (750/sq mi)
- OS grid reference: TQ737092
  - London: 51 miles (82 km) NNW
- District: Rother
- Shire county: East Sussex
- Region: South East
- Country: England
- Sovereign state: United Kingdom
- Post town: BEXHILL-ON-SEA
- Postcode district: TN39
- Dialling code: 01424
- Police: Sussex
- Fire: East Sussex
- Ambulance: South East Coast
- UK Parliament: Bexhill and Battle
- Website: http://www.sidleyonline.co.uk/

Sidley is a village on the outskirts of Bexhill-on-Sea in East Sussex, England. Its governance falls within the jurisdiction of the charter trustees town of Bexhill. It is also a ward of Rother district council.

In 1828 Sidley played host to the 'Battle of Sidley Green'.

It is home to two primary schools, Sidley C.P and All Saints CoE.

== Sport and leisure ==
Sidley United F.C. is a non-League football club who play home matches at Hooe Recreation Ground. The club compete in the East Sussex Football League. Until 2013 the club was based at The Gullivers in the village, a ground shared with Sidley Cricket Club.
