= Listed buildings in Rother district, East Sussex =

There are about 2,200 Listed Buildings in Rother District, which are buildings of architectural or historic interest.

- Grade I buildings are of exceptional interest.
- Grade II* buildings are particularly important buildings of more than special interest.
- Grade II buildings are of special interest.

The lists follow Historic England’s geographical organisation, with entries grouped by county, local authority, and parish (civil and non-civil). The following lists are arranged by parish.

Area	Listed buildings list	Grade I	Grade II*	Grade II	Total
Ashburnham	Listed buildings in Ashburnham, East Sussex	1	2	63	66
Battle	Listed buildings in Battle, East Sussex	5	7	159	171
Beckley	Listed buildings in Beckley, East Sussex	1	1	73	75
Bexhill-on-Sea	Listed buildings in Bexhill-on-Sea	1	1	79	81
Bodiam	Listed buildings in Bodiam	1	1	13	15
Brede	Listed buildings in Brede, East Sussex	1	2	59	62
Brightling	Listed buildings in Brightling	1	6	46	53
Burwash	Listed buildings in Burwash	1	6	131	138
Camber	Listed buildings in Camber, East Sussex			1	1
Catsfield	Listed buildings in Catsfield		1	36	37
Crowhurst	Listed buildings in Crowhurst, East Sussex	1	1	23	25
Dallington	Listed buildings in Dallington, East Sussex				45
East Guldeford	Listed buildings in East Guldeford				9
Etchingham	Listed buildings in Etchingham	2		26	28
Ewhurst	Listed buildings in Ewhurst, East Sussex	1		65	66
Fairlight	Listed buildings in Fairlight, East Sussex				14
Guestling	Listed buildings in Guestling	1	1	36	38
Hurst Green	Listed buildings in Hurst Green, East Sussex				51
Icklesham (includes Winchelsea and Rye Harbour)	Listed buildings in Icklesham	8	7	126	141
Iden	Listed buildings in Iden, East Sussex	1	1	40	42
Mountfield	Listed buildings in Mountfield, East Sussex				31
Northiam	Listed buildings in Northiam	2	6	122	130
Peasmarsh	Listed buildings in Peasmarsh				54
Penhurst	Listed buildings in Penhurst				14
Pett	Listed buildings in Pett				22
Playden	Listed buildings in Playden				15
Rye	Listed buildings in Rye, East Sussex	4	10	284	298
Rye Foreign	Listed buildings in Rye Foreign				8
Salehurst and Robertsbridge	Listed buildings in Salehurst and Robertsbridge				105
Sedlescombe	Listed buildings in Sedlescombe	1	2	54	57
Ticehurst	Listed buildings in Ticehurst	1	4	154	157
Udimore	Listed buildings in Udimore				30
Westfield	Listed buildings in Westfield, East Sussex				39
Whatlington	Listed buildings in Whatlington				24
Total (Rother district)	—	41	78	2,023	2,142
