= Listed buildings in Ashburnham, East Sussex =

Civil Parish in East Sussex, England

Ashburnham, is a civil parish in the Rother district of East Sussex, England. It contains 66 listed buildings that are recorded in the National Heritage List for England. Of these one is grade I, two are grade II* and 63 are grade II.

This list is based on the information retrieved online from Historic England

== Listing ==
Name	Grade	Location	Type	Completed (Note: The date given is the date used by Historic England as significant for the initial building or that of an important part in the structure's description.)	Date designated	Grid ref. (Note: Sometimes known as OSGB36, the grid reference is based on the British national grid reference system used by the Ordnance Survey.) Geo-coordinates	Notes	Entry number (Note: The "List Entry Number" is a unique number assigned to each listed building and scheduled monument by Historic England.)	Image	Wikidata
Parish Church of St Peter	I	Ashburnham	Church		3 August 1961	TQ6895114549; 50°54′20″N 0°24′06″E		1044264	Parish Church of St Peter More images	Q17534945
1-4 Brownbread Street	II	Ashburnham			13 May 1987	TQ6763414976; 50°54′36″N 0°22′59″E		1044263	Upload Photo	
1 and 2 Ponts Green	II	Ashburnham			13 May 1987	TQ6786015754; 50°55′01″N 0°23′12″E		1229960	Upload Photo	
Agmerhurst House	II	Ashburnham			3 August 1961	TQ7019314336; 50°54′12″N 0°25′09″E		1278842	Upload Photo	
Ammerbrook	II	Ashburnham			13 May 1987	TQ6870316036; 50°55′09″N 0°23′55″E		1229635	Upload Photo	
Ashburnham Furnace (Pay Cottage)	II	Ashburnham			3 August 1961	TQ6848017086; 50°55′43″N 0°23′46″E		1229924	Upload Photo	
Ashburnham Place (Christian Conference and Prayer Centre)	II	Ashburnham			13 May 1987	TQ6903514579; 50°54′21″N 0°24′10″E		1229643	Ashburnham Place (Christian Conference and Prayer Centre) More images	Q4804654
The Bridge Between the Lakes at Ashburnham Place	II	Ashburnham			3 August 1961	TQ6917814462; 50°54′17″N 0°24′17″E		1044233	The Bridge Between the Lakes at Ashburnham Place More images	
The Former Stables at Ashburnham Place (Now Flats)	II*	Ashburnham			3 August 1961	TQ6892014524; 50°54′20″N 0°24′04″E		1278909	The Former Stables at Ashburnham Place (Now Flats) More images	
The Garden Wall to the South of the Orangery at Ashburnham Place	II	Ashburnham			13 May 1987	TQ6901014534; 50°54′20″N 0°24′09″E		1352834	Upload Photo	
The Orangery at Ashburnham Place	II	Ashburnham			13 May 1987	TQ6899114560; 50°54′21″N 0°24′08″E		1278906	The Orangery at Ashburnham Place More images	
The Terrace and Garden Walls of Ashburnham Place	II	Ashburnham			13 May 1987	TQ6908014545; 50°54′20″N 0°24′12″E		1044232	Upload Photo	
Ashburnham Post Office and the Postmaster's House Adjoining	II	Ashburnham			3 August 1961	TQ6767115935; 50°55′07″N 0°23′03″E		1044240	Upload Photo	
Bray's Hill Farmhouse	II	Ashburnham			13 May 1987	TQ6720814121; 50°54′08″N 0°22′36″E		1044261	Upload Photo	
Bray's Hill House	II	Ashburnham			13 May 1987	TQ6722414128; 50°54′09″N 0°22′37″E		1229529	Upload Photo	
Brigden Hill Cottage	II	Ashburnham			3 August 1961	TQ6657815428; 50°54′51″N 0°22′06″E		1044227	Upload Photo	
Brigden Hill Farmhouse	II	Ashburnham			13 May 1987	TQ6672415588; 50°54′56″N 0°22′13″E		1044226	Upload Photo	
Buckwell Farmhouse	II	Ashburnham			3 August 1961	TQ6732117310; 50°55′52″N 0°22′47″E		1230015	Upload Photo	
Cinder Hill Farmhouse	II	Ashburnham			13 May 1987	TQ6674717624; 50°56′02″N 0°22′18″E		1044231	Upload Photo	
Court Lodge Farmhouse	II*	Ashburnham			3 August 1961	TQ6822016383; 50°55′21″N 0°23′31″E		1352831	Upload Photo	
Barn at Court Lodge Farm to the North East of the Granary and Oasthouse	II	Ashburnham			18 February 1987	TQ6824316437; 50°55′22″N 0°23′33″E		1352832	Upload Photo	
Granary and Oasthouse at Court Lodge Farm to the North East of the Farmhouse	II	Ashburnham			18 February 1987	TQ6823416405; 50°55′21″N 0°23′32″E		1044229	Upload Photo	
Forge Lodge, Ashburnham Place	II	Ashburnham			13 May 1987	TQ6866416003; 50°55′08″N 0°23′53″E		1044230	Upload Photo	
Henley Bridge Cottage	II	Ashburnham			13 May 1987	TQ6716313831; 50°53′59″N 0°22′33″E		1229533	Upload Photo	
Kitchenham	II	Ashburnham			13 May 1987	TQ6807913097; 50°53′34″N 0°23′19″E		1229641	Upload Photo	
Barn and Oasthouse at Kitchenham to the North East of the Farmhouse	II	Ashburnham			13 May 1987	TQ6808413156; 50°53′36″N 0°23′19″E		1352833	Upload Photo	
Lakehurst	II	Ashburnham			13 May 1987	TQ6758817850; 50°56′09″N 0°23′01″E		1044235	Upload Photo	
Barn Adjoining Lakehurst on the North East	II	Ashburnham			13 May 1987	TQ6760317862; 50°56′09″N 0°23′02″E		1229921	Upload Photo	
Lattenden's Farmhouse	II	Ashburnham			13 May 1987	TQ6646916560; 50°55′28″N 0°22′02″E		1352829	Upload Photo	
Lingham's Farmhouse	II	Ashburnham			13 May 1987	TQ6809014400; 50°54′17″N 0°23′21″E		1044262	Upload Photo	
Little Acre	II	Ashburnham			13 May 1987	TQ6736914296; 50°54′14″N 0°22′44″E		1044259	Upload Photo	
Little Midge	II	Ashburnham			13 May 1987	TQ6657715541; 50°54′55″N 0°22′06″E		1352830	Upload Photo	
Northlands	II	Ashburnham			13 May 1987	TQ6765814889; 50°54′33″N 0°23′00″E		1279051	Upload Photo	
Old Chapel House	II	Ashburnham			13 May 1987	TQ6687717419; 50°55′55″N 0°22′24″E		1044242	Upload Photo	
Old School House	II	Ashburnham			13 May 1987	TQ6830614403; 50°54′16″N 0°23′32″E		1229551	Upload Photo	
Oliver's Hill	II	Ashburnham			13 May 1987	TQ6689517474; 50°55′57″N 0°22′25″E		1044237	Upload Photo	
Peltham	II	Ashburnham			13 May 1987	TQ6751215888; 50°55′05″N 0°22′54″E		1044224	Upload Photo	
Peltham Cottage	II	Ashburnham			13 May 1987	TQ6732215866; 50°55′05″N 0°22′45″E		1044225	Upload Photo	
Pigknoll	II	Ashburnham			3 August 1961	TQ6822214886; 50°54′32″N 0°23′29″E		1279022	Upload Photo	
Pleasure House	II	Ashburnham			13 May 1987	TQ6706317875; 50°56′10″N 0°22′35″E		1044234	Upload Photo	
Ponts Green Farmhouse	II	Ashburnham			13 May 1987	TQ6772415887; 50°55′05″N 0°23′05″E		1278827	Upload Photo	
Rainbows End	II	Ashburnham			13 May 1987	TQ6734914283; 50°54′14″N 0°22′43″E		1044260	Upload Photo	
Red Barn Farmhouse	II	Ashburnham			13 May 1987	TQ6722717051; 50°55′43″N 0°22′42″E		1352837	Upload Photo	
Barn at Red Pale Farm to the South of the Farmhouse	II	Ashburnham			13 May 1987	TQ6587616241; 50°55′18″N 0°21′31″E		1044258	Upload Photo	
Red Pale Farmhouse	II	Ashburnham			3 August 1961	TQ6588416251; 50°55′19″N 0°21′32″E		1044257	Upload Photo	
Reedlands Farm Cottage	II	Ashburnham			13 May 1987	TQ6788315748; 50°55′00″N 0°23′13″E		1044239	Upload Photo	
Reedlands Farmhouse	II	Ashburnham			3 August 1961	TQ6782215725; 50°55′00″N 0°23′10″E		1044238	Upload Photo	
Silvericks Farmhouse	II	Ashburnham			13 May 1987	TQ6662417428; 50°55′56″N 0°22′11″E		1278802	Upload Photo	
Barn at Silvericks Farm	II	Ashburnham			13 May 1987	TQ6660617370; 50°55′54″N 0°22′10″E		1352836	Upload Photo	
Oasthouse at Silvericks Farm	II	Ashburnham			13 May 1987	TQ6667017387; 50°55′55″N 0°22′14″E		1230010	Upload Photo	
South Lodge	II	Ashburnham			13 May 1987	TQ6943014130; 50°54′06″N 0°24′30″E		1352835	South Lodge More images	
Gate Piers and Flanking Walls at South Lodge	II	Ashburnham			13 May 1987	TQ6941914123; 50°54′06″N 0°24′29″E		1278878	Upload Photo	
Street Cottage	II	Ashburnham			13 May 1987	TQ6766014938; 50°54′34″N 0°23′00″E		1229539	Upload Photo	
Suttons	II	Ashburnham			13 May 1987	TQ6765315102; 50°54′40″N 0°23′00″E		1229543	Upload Photo	
The Almshouses	II	Ashburnham			13 May 1987	TQ6830514452; 50°54′18″N 0°23′33″E		1044265	Upload Photo	
The Ash Tree Inn	II	Ashburnham			13 May 1987	TQ6763214934; 50°54′34″N 0°22′59″E		1352848	Upload Photo	
The Old Lodging House	II	Ashburnham			13 May 1987	TQ6816115192; 50°54′42″N 0°23′26″E		1279024	Upload Photo	
The Old Shop	II	Ashburnham			3 August 1961	TQ6789915713; 50°54′59″N 0°23′14″E		1229953	Upload Photo	
The Pound	II	Ashburnham			13 May 1987	TQ6832614300; 50°54′13″N 0°23′33″E		1279016	Upload Photo	
The Pound	II	Ashburnham			3 August 1961	TQ6831214340; 50°54′14″N 0°23′33″E		1352809	Upload Photo	
Thorndale Farmhouse	II	Ashburnham			13 May 1987	TQ6716917007; 50°55′42″N 0°22′39″E		1278811	Upload Photo	
Thornden Farmhouse	II	Ashburnham			3 August 1961	TQ6736716816; 50°55′35″N 0°22′48″E		1044241	Upload Photo	
Trinity Cottage	II	Ashburnham			13 May 1987	TQ6841917451; 50°55′55″N 0°23′43″E		1044236	Upload Photo	
Vicarage Cottage	II	Ashburnham			13 May 1987	TQ6826214980; 50°54′35″N 0°23′31″E		1352810	Upload Photo	
Wilson's Farmhouse	II	Ashburnham			13 May 1987	TQ6716213136; 50°53′37″N 0°22′32″E		1352847	Upload Photo	
Winter's Farmhouse	II	Ashburnham			13 May 1987	TQ6672115226; 50°54′45″N 0°22′13″E		1044228	Upload Photo	

== See also ==
- Grade I listed buildings in East Sussex
- Grade II* listed buildings in East Sussex

== Sources ==
- Antram, Nicholas; Pevsner, Nikolaus (2012) [1965], Sussex: East, The Buildings of England, New Haven and London: Yale University Press, ISBN 978-0-300-18473-0
