= Listed buildings in Rye, East Sussex =

Civil Parish in East Sussex, England

Rye is town and a civil parish in the Rother district of East Sussex, England. It contains 298 listed buildings that are recorded in the National Heritage List for England. Of these four are grade I, ten are grade II* and 284 are grade II.

This list is based on the information retrieved online from Historic England.

== Listing ==
Name	Grade	Location	Type	Completed (Note: The date given is the date used by Historic England as significant for the initial building or that of an important part in the structure's description.)	Date designated	Grid ref. (Note: The grid reference is based on the British national grid reference system, sometimes known as OSGB36, used by the Ordnance Survey.) Geo-coordinates	Notes	Entry number (Note: The "List Entry Number" is a unique number assigned to each listed building and scheduled monument by Historic England.)	Image	Wikidata
Holmlea	II	Bridge Place			11 September 1972	TQ9223920733; 50°57′14″N 0°44′08″E		1044324	Upload Photo	Q26296367
Cobbled Street Church Square	II	Church Square			11 September 1972	TQ9213420248; 50°56′59″N 0°44′02″E		1044325	Cobbled Street Church Square More images	Q26296368
The Water Tower (standing in the North East Corner of the Churchyard)	II*	Church Square			12 October 1951	TQ9217620322; 50°57′01″N 0°44′04″E		1044326	The Water Tower (standing in the North East Corner of the Churchyard) More images	Q17555900
Church of St Mary	I	Church Square			12 October 1951	TQ9215020302; 50°57′00″N 0°44′03″E		1190669	Church of St Mary More images	Q11947609
War Memorial in St Mary's churchyard	II	Church Square			19 December 2017	TQ9218520295; 50°57′00″N 0°44′05″E		1451749	War Memorial in St Mary's churchyard More images	Q66479176
St Michaels, 1, Church Square	II	1, Church Square			12 October 1951	TQ9217020334; 50°57′01″N 0°44′04″E		1293688	St Michaels, 1, Church Square More images	Q26581602
2 and 4, Church Square	II	2 and 4, Church Square			12 October 1951	TQ9218520332; 50°57′01″N 0°44′05″E		1352822	2 and 4, Church Square More images	Q26635797
Tudor Cottage	II	6, Church Square			12 October 1951	TQ9219220322; 50°57′01″N 0°44′05″E		1044289	Tudor Cottage More images	Q26296326
8 and 10, Church Square	II	8 and 10, Church Square			12 October 1951	TQ9219720314; 50°57′01″N 0°44′06″E		1044290	8 and 10, Church Square More images	Q26296328
Church House	II	12, Church Square			12 October 1951	TQ9220420305; 50°57′00″N 0°44′06″E		1352823	Church House More images	Q26635798
16, Church Square	II	16, Church Square			8 August 1968	TQ9218820271; 50°56′59″N 0°44′05″E		1044291	16, Church Square More images	Q26296330
20, Church Square	II	20, Church Square			8 August 1968	TQ9217720265; 50°56′59″N 0°44′04″E		1352824	20, Church Square More images	Q26635799
22 and 24, Church Square	II	22 and 24, Church Square			12 October 1951	TQ9217220263; 50°56′59″N 0°44′04″E		1044292	22 and 24, Church Square More images	Q26296331
26, Church Square	II	26, Church Square			12 October 1951	TQ9216520256; 50°56′59″N 0°44′04″E		1352825	26, Church Square More images	Q26635800
Tara House	II	28, Church Square			12 October 1951	TQ9216020252; 50°56′59″N 0°44′04″E		1044293	Tara House More images	Q26296332
32, Church Square	II	32, Church Square			12 October 1951	TQ9215320250; 50°56′59″N 0°44′03″E		1044294	32, Church Square More images	Q26296333
34, Church Square	II	34, Church Square			12 October 1951	TQ9214920247; 50°56′59″N 0°44′03″E		1352826	34, Church Square More images	Q26635801
36, Church Square	II	36, Church Square			12 October 1951	TQ9214420245; 50°56′59″N 0°44′03″E		1044295	36, Church Square More images	Q26296334
38, Church Square	II	38, Church Square			12 October 1951	TQ9214020242; 50°56′58″N 0°44′02″E		1352827	38, Church Square More images	Q26635802
The Old Stone House	II	40, Church Square			12 October 1951	TQ9213220237; 50°56′58″N 0°44′02″E		1044296	The Old Stone House More images	Q26296335
Winston Cottage, 44, Church Square	II	44, Church Square			8 August 1968	TQ9212220233; 50°56′58″N 0°44′02″E		1251448	Winston Cottage, 44, Church Square More images	Q26543406
The Store House	II	46, Church Square			8 August 1968	TQ9211820221; 50°56′58″N 0°44′01″E		1044297	Upload Photo	Q26296336
The Undercroft of No 46 (the Store House)	II	46, Church Square			8 August 1968	TQ9212320216; 50°56′58″N 0°44′02″E		1352828	Upload Photo	Q26635803
St Anthony of Padua	II*	48, Church Square			12 October 1951	TQ9210520247; 50°56′59″N 0°44′01″E		1262779	St Anthony of Padua More images	Q17556112
50 and 52, Church Square	II	50 and 52, Church Square			12 October 1951	TQ9210020257; 50°56′59″N 0°44′00″E		1044298	50 and 52, Church Square More images	Q26296337
54-60, Church Square	II	54-60, Church Square			12 October 1951	TQ9209620269; 50°56′59″N 0°44′00″E		1262743	54-60, Church Square More images	Q26553600
Greensills	II	62, Church Square			12 October 1951	TQ9209120292; 50°57′00″N 0°44′00″E		1044299	Greensills More images	Q26296338
64, Church Square	II	64, Church Square			12 October 1951	TQ9209520297; 50°57′00″N 0°44′00″E		1044300	Upload Photo	Q26296339
The Old Vicarage	II	66, Church Square			12 October 1951	TQ9211220312; 50°57′01″N 0°44′01″E		1251488	The Old Vicarage More images	Q26543444
Quarter Boys Cottage, 70 and 72, Church Square	II	70 and 72, Church Square			11 September 1972	TQ9212820313; 50°57′01″N 0°44′02″E		1044301	Quarter Boys Cottage, 70 and 72, Church Square More images	Q26296340
The Old Dairy Market (including Rear Part of Rye Town Wall)	II	Cinque Port Street			25 August 1987	TQ9193820408; 50°57′04″N 0°43′52″E		1252200	Upload Photo	Q26544089
Portion of the Town Walls to the South of Cinque Ports Street and West of Conduit Hill	II	Cinque Ports Street			12 October 1951	TQ9208620503; 50°57′07″N 0°44′00″E		1044302	Portion of the Town Walls to the South of Cinque Ports Street and West of Conduit Hill More images	Q26296341
Portion of the Town Walls to the South of Cinque Ports Street and West of Market Road	II	Cinque Ports Street			12 October 1951	TQ9196020417; 50°57′04″N 0°43′54″E		1044303	Upload Photo	Q26296342
Rye Railway Station	II	Cinque Ports Street			11 April 1980	TQ9189920544; 50°57′09″N 0°43′51″E		1252164	Rye Railway Station More images	Q7384993
Portion of the Town Walls to the South of Cinque Ports Street and Adjoining Wish Ward	II	Cinque Ports Street			11 September 1972	TQ9187920333; 50°57′02″N 0°43′49″E		1262760	Portion of the Town Walls to the South of Cinque Ports Street and Adjoining Wish Ward More images	Q26553615
K6 Telephone Kiosk	II	Cinque Ports Street			17 June 2004	TQ9212420543; 50°57′08″N 0°44′02″E		1390873	K6 Telephone Kiosk More images	Q26670250
2 and 4, Cinque Ports Street	II	2 and 4, Cinque Ports Street			11 September 1972	TQ9188820393; 50°57′04″N 0°43′50″E		1044304	2 and 4, Cinque Ports Street More images	Q26296344
6, Cinque Ports Street	II	6, Cinque Ports Street			11 September 1972	TQ9189720398; 50°57′04″N 0°43′50″E		1251494	6, Cinque Ports Street More images	Q26543449
43, Cinque Ports Street	II	43, Cinque Ports Street			11 September 1972	TQ9197920446; 50°57′05″N 0°43′55″E		1251490	43, Cinque Ports Street More images	Q26543446
56-62, Cinque Ports Street	II	56-62, Cinque Ports Street			11 September 1972	TQ9210020549; 50°57′08″N 0°44′01″E		1044305	Upload Photo	Q26296345
Cobbled Street Conduit Hill	II	Conduit Hill			11 September 1972	TQ9213920514; 50°57′07″N 0°44′03″E		1044306	Cobbled Street Conduit Hill More images	Q26296346
Whitefriars	II	Conduit Hill			12 October 1951	TQ9213120497; 50°57′07″N 0°44′02″E		1262722	Whitefriars More images	Q26553580
The Monastery	II	Conduit Hill			12 October 1951	TQ9216720490; 50°57′06″N 0°44′04″E		1352789	The Monastery More images	Q26635765
St Andrews and Part of Cap Griz Nez	II	East Cliff			11 September 1972	TQ9221920510; 50°57′07″N 0°44′07″E		1044308	St Andrews and Part of Cap Griz Nez More images	Q26296348
Cobbled Forecourts to Nos 1-4 (consecutive)	II	East Cliff			11 September 1972	TQ9221620594; 50°57′10″N 0°44′07″E		1251498	Upload Photo	Q26543453
Cobbled Forecourts to Forge House and the Forge Adjoining Forge House	II	East Cliff			11 September 1972	TQ9222220597; 50°57′10″N 0°44′07″E		1251504	Upload Photo	Q26543459
Cobbled Forecourt, Iron Railings, Gate And Gatepiers To Dormy House Club	II	East Cliff			11 September 1972	TQ9221420574; 50°57′09″N 0°44′07″E		1262726	Cobbled Forecourt, Iron Railings, Gate And Gatepiers To Dormy House Club More images	Q26553584
Dormy House Club	II	East Cliff			12 October 1951	TQ9219720574; 50°57′09″N 0°44′06″E		1352790	Dormy House Club More images	Q26635766
Forge House and forge adjoining Forge House	II	East Cliff			8 August 1968	TQ9222420604; 50°57′10″N 0°44′07″E		1352791	Forge House and forge adjoining Forge House More images	Q26635767
Tower Place	II	1-4, East Cliff			8 August 1968	TQ9221220592; 50°57′10″N 0°44′07″E		1044307	Tower Place More images	Q26296347
La Rochelle	II	East Street			11 September 1972	TQ9219920372; 50°57′03″N 0°44′06″E		1044266	La Rochelle More images	Q26296301
The Vicarage and Taverners	II	East Street			12 October 1951	TQ9219320398; 50°57′03″N 0°44′05″E		1044267	Upload Photo	Q26296302
Cannon House	II	East Street			12 October 1951	TQ9219620392; 50°57′03″N 0°44′06″E		1262729	Upload Photo	Q26553587
The Union Inn	II	East Street			12 October 1951	TQ9217520388; 50°57′03″N 0°44′05″E		1352792	The Union Inn More images	Q26635768
Chequer	II	East Street			12 October 1951	TQ9219920383; 50°57′03″N 0°44′06″E		1352811	Chequer More images	Q26635787
104, 104A, High Street, 1, East Street	II*	1, East Street			12 October 1951	TQ9215320426; 50°57′04″N 0°44′03″E		1251729	104, 104A, High Street, 1, East Street More images	Q17556084
2, East Street	II	2, East Street			11 September 1972	TQ9216520414; 50°57′04″N 0°44′04″E		1044309	2, East Street More images	Q26296349
3, East Street	II	3, East Street			11 September 1972	TQ9216820408; 50°57′04″N 0°44′04″E		1251506	3, East Street More images	Q26543461
Ypres Tower and part of Rye Town Wall	I	Rye Castle Museum. 3, East Street, TN31 7JY			12 October 1951	TQ9224820271; 50°56′59″N 0°44′08″E		1251521	Ypres Tower and part of Rye Town Wall More images	Q7384956
Womens' Tower, former prison cells and exercise yard	II	3, East Street, TN31 7JY			11 May 2016	TQ9226020280; 50°57′00″N 0°44′09″E		1433223	Womens' Tower, former prison cells and exercise yard More images	Q26677900
4-7, East Street	II	4-7, East Street			11 September 1972	TQ9217020400; 50°57′04″N 0°44′04″E		1044310	4-7, East Street More images	Q26296350
9, East Street	II	9, East Street			8 August 1968	TQ9217920378; 50°57′03″N 0°44′05″E		1262727	Upload Photo	Q26553585
16, East Street	II	16, East Street			12 October 1951	TQ9218720405; 50°57′04″N 0°44′05″E		1262731	Upload Photo	Q26553589
17 and 17a, East Street	II	17 and 17a, East Street			11 September 1972	TQ9218320414; 50°57′04″N 0°44′05″E		1262732	Upload Photo	Q26553590
18 and 19, East Street	II	18 and 19, East Street			11 September 1972	TQ9217720426; 50°57′04″N 0°44′05″E		1251516	Upload Photo	Q26543470
Rye Windmill	II	Ferry Road			12 October 1951	TQ9164820321; 50°57′02″N 0°43′37″E		1251517	Rye Windmill More images	Q5558878
The Crown Inn	II	Ferry Road			11 September 1972	TQ9187220402; 50°57′04″N 0°43′49″E		1251519	The Crown Inn More images	Q26543473
2-6, Ferry Road	II	2-6, Ferry Road			11 September 1972	TQ9186620370; 50°57′03″N 0°43′49″E		1262733	2-6, Ferry Road More images	Q26553591
8 and 10, Ferry Road	II	8 and 10, Ferry Road			11 September 1972	TQ9186520380; 50°57′03″N 0°43′49″E		1251518	8 and 10, Ferry Road More images	Q26543472
9 and 11, Ferry Road	II	9 and 11, Ferry Road			17 July 1990	TQ9183320421; 50°57′05″N 0°43′47″E		1252215	9 and 11, Ferry Road More images	Q26544104
12 and 14, Ferry Road	II	12 and 14, Ferry Road			11 September 1972	TQ9186420389; 50°57′04″N 0°43′49″E		1262734	12 and 14, Ferry Road More images	Q26553592
40, Fishmarket Road	II	40, Fishmarket Road			11 September 1972	TQ9223220394; 50°57′03″N 0°44′07″E		1262735	Upload Photo	Q26553593
South Ridge	II	Gun Gardens			11 September 1972	TQ9221620301; 50°57′00″N 0°44′06″E		1251520	South Ridge More images	Q26543474
The Old Coach House	II	High Street			11 September 1972	TQ9212520465; 50°57′06″N 0°44′02″E		1251526	Upload Photo	Q26543479
Gate Piers	II	High Street, TN31 7JF			11 September 1972	TQ9214320437; 50°57′05″N 0°44′03″E		1251544	Upload Photo	Q26543494
Rye Working Men's Conservative Club	I	High Street			12 October 1951	TQ9210220422; 50°57′04″N 0°44′01″E		1251550	Rye Working Men's Conservative Club More images	Q17535177
Cobbled Lane High Street	II	High Street			11 September 1972	TQ9195720365; 50°57′03″N 0°43′53″E		1251556	Upload Photo	Q26543504
Barclays Bank Longer House	II	High Street			11 September 1972	TQ9200420368; 50°57′03″N 0°43′56″E		1251621	Barclays Bank Longer House More images	Q26543564
The Standard Inn	II	High Street			12 October 1951	TQ9191220360; 50°57′03″N 0°43′51″E		1251652	The Standard Inn More images	Q26543594
Bank Chambers (the Justices' Clerk's Offices)	II*	High Street			12 October 1951	TQ9199320348; 50°57′02″N 0°43′55″E		1251665	Bank Chambers (the Justices' Clerk's Offices) More images	Q17556076
The George Hotel	II	High Street			12 October 1951	TQ9209920399; 50°57′04″N 0°44′01″E		1251726	The George Hotel More images	Q26543663
Cobbled and Brick Lane High Street	II	High Street			11 September 1972	TQ9191020369; 50°57′03″N 0°43′51″E		1251972	Upload Photo	Q26543883
Needles Cottage	II	High Street			11 September 1972	TQ9191320380; 50°57′03″N 0°43′51″E		1251973	Upload Photo	Q26543884
Mint Court	II	High Street			11 September 1972	TQ9196120377; 50°57′03″N 0°43′54″E		1262711	Upload Photo	Q26553570
1 and 1a, High Street	II	1 and 1a, High Street			11 September 1972	TQ9221020492; 50°57′07″N 0°44′07″E		1262736	1 and 1a, High Street More images	Q26553594
2, High Street	II	2, High Street			11 September 1972	TQ9220220486; 50°57′06″N 0°44′06″E		1251522	2, High Street More images	Q26543475
3, High Street	II	3, High Street			11 September 1972	TQ9219820483; 50°57′06″N 0°44′06″E		1262737	3, High Street More images	Q26553595
4, High Street	II	4, High Street			11 September 1972	TQ9219420480; 50°57′06″N 0°44′06″E		1251523	4, High Street More images	Q26543476
Monastery Guest House	II	6, High Street			11 September 1972	TQ9218020469; 50°57′06″N 0°44′05″E		1251524	Monastery Guest House More images	Q26543477
The Customs House	II	7 and 7a, High Street			11 September 1972	TQ9217020463; 50°57′06″N 0°44′04″E		1262708	The Customs House More images	Q26553567
9 and 10, High Street	II	9 and 10, High Street			12 October 1951	TQ9214920447; 50°57′05″N 0°44′03″E		1251525	9 and 10, High Street More images	Q26543478
Gazebo in the Garden of No 11	II	11, High Street			8 August 1968	TQ9206720492; 50°57′07″N 0°43′59″E		1251527	Gazebo in the Garden of No 11 More images	Q26543480
11 and 11a, High Street	II	11 and 11a, High Street, TN31 7JF			12 October 1951	TQ9213320437; 50°57′05″N 0°44′02″E		1251546	11 and 11a, High Street More images	Q26543496
12-14, High Street	II	12-14, High Street			8 August 1968	TQ9211620430; 50°57′05″N 0°44′02″E		1262738	12-14, High Street More images	Q26553596
15 and 15a, High Street, 16 and 17 High Street	II	15 and 15a, High Street, 16 and 17 High Street			8 August 1968	TQ9208720416; 50°57′04″N 0°44′00″E		1251551	15 and 15a, High Street, 16 and 17 High Street More images	Q26543499
21 and 22, High Street	II	21 and 22, High Street			11 September 1972	TQ9206520406; 50°57′04″N 0°43′59″E		1251552	21 and 22, High Street More images	Q26543500
23, High Street	II	23, High Street			11 September 1972	TQ9205920403; 50°57′04″N 0°43′59″E		1251553	23, High Street More images	Q26543501
Holloway House	II	24, High Street			12 October 1951	TQ9205120398; 50°57′04″N 0°43′58″E		1262709	Holloway House More images	Q26553568
25, High Street	II	25, High Street			11 September 1972	TQ9204320391; 50°57′03″N 0°43′58″E		1251554	25, High Street More images	Q26543502
26, High Street	II	26, High Street			11 September 1972	TQ9203720386; 50°57′03″N 0°43′57″E		1262701	26, High Street More images	Q26553561
27, High Street	II	27, High Street			11 September 1972	TQ9203220382; 50°57′03″N 0°43′57″E		1262710	27, High Street More images	Q26553569
31 and 31a, High Street	II	31 and 31a, High Street			11 September 1972	TQ9198420363; 50°57′03″N 0°43′55″E		1251555	31 and 31a, High Street More images	Q26543503
The Mint Ye Old Bell Inn	II	32, High Street			11 September 1972	TQ9197520361; 50°57′03″N 0°43′54″E		1251623	The Mint Ye Old Bell Inn More images	Q26543566
34, High Street	II	34, High Street			11 September 1972	TQ9195220365; 50°57′03″N 0°43′53″E		1251630	34, High Street More images	Q26543573
35, High Street	II	35, High Street			11 September 1972	TQ9194320369; 50°57′03″N 0°43′53″E		1251557	35, High Street More images	Q26543505
36, High Street	II	36, High Street			11 September 1972	TQ9193620369; 50°57′03″N 0°43′52″E		1251638	36, High Street More images	Q26543581
37, High Street	II	37, High Street			11 September 1972	TQ9193020369; 50°57′03″N 0°43′52″E		1262712	37, High Street More images	Q26553571
38, High Street	II	38, High Street			11 September 1972	TQ9192620368; 50°57′03″N 0°43′52″E		1251646	38, High Street More images	Q26543588
39 and 40, High Street	II	39 and 40, High Street			11 September 1972	TQ9192020366; 50°57′03″N 0°43′51″E		1251558	39 and 40, High Street More images	Q26543506
41, High Street	II	41, High Street			12 October 1951	TQ9190820356; 50°57′02″N 0°43′51″E		1251653	41, High Street More images	Q26543595
43, High Street	II	43, High Street			12 October 1951	TQ9190520351; 50°57′02″N 0°43′51″E		1251654	43, High Street More images	Q26543596
44 and 44a, High Street	II	44 and 44a, High Street			11 September 1972	TQ9190220344; 50°57′02″N 0°43′50″E		1251656	44 and 44a, High Street More images	Q26543598
The Old House	II	45 and 46, High Street			12 October 1951	TQ9189920335; 50°57′02″N 0°43′50″E		1251657	The Old House More images	Q26543599
Causeway Cottage, 51, High Street	II	51, High Street			11 September 1972	TQ9188920312; 50°57′01″N 0°43′50″E		1251658	Causeway Cottage, 51, High Street More images	Q26543600
Honeysuckle Cottage, 53, High Street	II	53, High Street			11 September 1972	TQ9188720304; 50°57′01″N 0°43′50″E		1262681	Honeysuckle Cottage, 53, High Street More images	Q26553541
Mint Chambers	II	54, High Street			12 October 1951	TQ9188620301; 50°57′01″N 0°43′50″E		1251660	Mint Chambers More images	Q26543602
55, High Street	II	55, High Street			11 September 1972	TQ9189020278; 50°57′00″N 0°43′50″E		1251661	55, High Street More images	Q26543603
56 and 57, High Street	II	56 and 57, High Street			8 August 1968	TQ9190420274; 50°57′00″N 0°43′50″E		1262642	56 and 57, High Street More images	Q26553506
58, High Street	II	58, High Street			11 September 1972	TQ9190120282; 50°57′00″N 0°43′50″E		1262623	58, High Street More images	Q26553488
67, High Street	II	67, High Street			12 October 1951	TQ9192120346; 50°57′02″N 0°43′51″E		1251662	Upload Photo	Q26543604
68 and 69, High Street	II	68 and 69, High Street			12 October 1951	TQ9192620353; 50°57′02″N 0°43′52″E		1251706	Upload Photo	Q26543643
70, High Street	II	70, High Street			11 September 1972	TQ9193120356; 50°57′02″N 0°43′52″E		1251712	Upload Photo	Q26543649
75 and 76, High Street	II	75 and 76, High Street			11 September 1972	TQ9195220353; 50°57′02″N 0°43′53″E		1251663	75 and 76, High Street More images	Q26543605
77, High Street	II	77, High Street			12 October 1951	TQ9195920351; 50°57′02″N 0°43′53″E		1251664	77, High Street More images	Q26543606
Easter Cottage	II	78, High Street			11 September 1972	TQ9197220349; 50°57′02″N 0°43′54″E		1251715	Easter Cottage More images	Q26543652
79 and 80, High Street	II	79 and 80, High Street			11 September 1972	TQ9197920349; 50°57′02″N 0°43′54″E		1262644	79 and 80, High Street More images	Q26553508
Langford House	II	85, High Street			12 October 1951	TQ9202220357; 50°57′02″N 0°43′57″E		1262645	Upload Photo	Q26553509
86, High Street	II	86, High Street			4 March 1986	TQ9203120361; 50°57′02″N 0°43′57″E		1252165	Upload Photo	Q26544060
88, High Street	II	88, High Street			11 September 1972	TQ9204220368; 50°57′03″N 0°43′58″E		1262635	Upload Photo	Q26553499
89, High Street	II	89, High Street			11 September 1972	TQ9204620370; 50°57′03″N 0°43′58″E		1262636	Upload Photo	Q26553500
92-96, High Street	II	92-96, High Street			11 September 1972	TQ9206920385; 50°57′03″N 0°43′59″E		1262637	Upload Photo	Q26553501
97, High Street	II	97, High Street			11 September 1972	TQ9208220391; 50°57′03″N 0°44′00″E		1251725	Upload Photo	Q26543662
99 and 100, High Street	II	99 and 100, High Street			12 October 1951	TQ9211820410; 50°57′04″N 0°44′02″E		1262638	99 and 100, High Street More images	Q26553502
The House of Gill	II	101, High Street			8 August 1968	TQ9213520417; 50°57′04″N 0°44′03″E		1251727	Upload Photo	Q26543664
102, High Street	II	102, High Street			11 September 1972	TQ9214220421; 50°57′04″N 0°44′03″E		1262639	Upload Photo	Q26553503
103 and 103a, High Street	II	103 and 103a, High Street			12 October 1951	TQ9214720423; 50°57′04″N 0°44′03″E		1251728	Upload Photo	Q26543665
105, High Street	II	105, High Street			11 September 1972	TQ9217520442; 50°57′05″N 0°44′05″E		1262640	105, High Street More images	Q26553504
106 and 107, High Street	II	106 and 107, High Street			11 September 1972	TQ9219020452; 50°57′05″N 0°44′05″E		1251730	106 and 107, High Street More images	Q26543666
109, High Street	II	109, High Street			11 September 1972	TQ9220020462; 50°57′06″N 0°44′06″E		1262641	109, High Street More images	Q26553505
110, High Street	II	110, High Street			11 September 1972	TQ9220520467; 50°57′06″N 0°44′06″E		1262604	110, High Street More images	Q26553468
111 and 112, High Street	II	111 and 112, High Street			11 September 1972	TQ9221220472; 50°57′06″N 0°44′07″E		1251751	111 and 112, High Street More images	Q26543686
113 and 114, High Street	II	113 and 114, High Street			11 September 1972	TQ9222020478; 50°57′06″N 0°44′07″E		1251733	113 and 114, High Street More images	Q26543669
Black Lantern	II	Hucksters Row			11 September 1972	TQ9217620241; 50°56′58″N 0°44′04″E		1251764	Upload Photo	Q26543699
The Forecastle	II	Hucksters Row			11 September 1972	TQ9218520220; 50°56′58″N 0°44′05″E		1262605	Upload Photo	Q26553469
4, Hucksters Row	II	4, Hucksters Row			11 September 1972	TQ9217220249; 50°56′59″N 0°44′04″E		1262613	Upload Photo	Q26553477
Cobbled Lane Hylands Yard	II	Hylands Yard			11 September 1972	TQ9195720339; 50°57′02″N 0°43′53″E		1251765	Upload Photo	Q26681498
Cobbles	II	Hylands Yard			11 September 1972	TQ9195120338; 50°57′02″N 0°43′53″E		1251767	Upload Photo	Q26543702
2, Hylands Yard	II	2, Hylands Yard			11 September 1972	TQ9195020334; 50°57′02″N 0°43′53″E		1262619	Upload Photo	Q26553484
7, Hylands Yard	II	7, Hylands Yard			11 September 1972	TQ9196320335; 50°57′02″N 0°43′54″E		1251768	Upload Photo	Q26543703
The Landgate	I	Landgate			12 October 1951	TQ9221320608; 50°57′10″N 0°44′07″E		1251769	The Landgate More images	Q17535188
Eagle House	II	Landgate			11 September 1972	TQ9218720697; 50°57′13″N 0°44′06″E		1251773	Eagle House More images	Q26543707
Eagle Cottage	II	Landgate			11 September 1972	TQ9218120688; 50°57′13″N 0°44′05″E		1262584	Eagle Cottage More images	Q26553450
Seymour House	II	Landgate			11 September 1972	TQ9215520657; 50°57′12″N 0°44′04″E		1262585	Upload Photo	Q26553451
Landgate House, 2, Landgate	II	2, Landgate			11 September 1972	TQ9219820632; 50°57′11″N 0°44′06″E		1262620	Landgate House, 2, Landgate More images	Q26553485
4, Landgate	II	4, Landgate			11 September 1972	TQ9220220653; 50°57′12″N 0°44′06″E		1262621	4, Landgate More images	Q26553486
5, Landgate	II	5, Landgate			11 September 1972	TQ9220220657; 50°57′12″N 0°44′06″E		1251771	5, Landgate More images	Q26543705
6, Landgate	II	6, Landgate			11 September 1972	TQ9220320661; 50°57′12″N 0°44′06″E		1251772	6, Landgate More images	Q26543706
7, Landgate	II	7, Landgate			11 September 1972	TQ9220520666; 50°57′12″N 0°44′07″E		1262622	7, Landgate More images	Q26553487
12 and 13, Landgate	II	12 and 13, Landgate			11 September 1972	TQ9221420705; 50°57′13″N 0°44′07″E		1251774	12 and 13, Landgate More images	Q26543708
15-24, Landgate	II	15-24, Landgate			11 September 1972	TQ9222220671; 50°57′12″N 0°44′07″E		1251775	15-24, Landgate More images	Q26543709
25, Landgate	II	25, Landgate			11 September 1975	TQ9222020617; 50°57′11″N 0°44′07″E		1251846	Upload Photo	Q26543773
26, Landgate	II	26, Landgate			11 September 1972	TQ9222120625; 50°57′11″N 0°44′07″E		1262586	Upload Photo	Q26553452
Pump	II	Landgate Square			11 September 1972	TQ9221320724; 50°57′14″N 0°44′07″E		1251868	Pump More images	Q26543793
1, Landgate Square	II	1, Landgate Square			27 January 1988	TQ9220920711; 50°57′14″N 0°44′07″E		1067331	1, Landgate Square More images	Q26320157
2, Landgate Square	II	2, Landgate Square			27 January 1988	TQ9220420714; 50°57′14″N 0°44′07″E		1356783	2, Landgate Square More images	Q26639413
3, Landgate Square	II	3, Landgate Square			11 September 1972	TQ9220020716; 50°57′14″N 0°44′06″E		1262587	3, Landgate Square More images	Q26553453
4, Landgate Square	II	4, Landgate Square			27 January 1988	TQ9219320713; 50°57′14″N 0°44′06″E		1262405	4, Landgate Square More images	Q26553282
5, 6, 7 and 8, Landgate Square	II	5, 6, 7 and 8, Landgate Square			27 January 1988	TQ9220020729; 50°57′14″N 0°44′06″E		1262422	5, 6, 7 and 8, Landgate Square More images	Q26553297
Fletcher's House	II	Lion Street			12 October 1951	TQ9213520322; 50°57′01″N 0°44′02″E		1251776	Fletcher's House More images	Q26543710
Peacock Lounge and Tea Rooms	II	Lion Street			12 October 1951	TQ9211920369; 50°57′03″N 0°44′02″E		1251878	Peacock Lounge and Tea Rooms More images	Q26543802
School Lane Cottage	II	Lion Street			11 September 1972	TQ9210820348; 50°57′02″N 0°44′01″E		1251980	Upload Photo	Q26543891
Cobbled Lane Lion Street	II	Lion Street			11 September 1972	TQ9212020347; 50°57′02″N 0°44′02″E		1262490	Upload Photo	Q66480455
Simon the Pieman	II	Lion Street			12 October 1951	TQ9213220330; 50°57′01″N 0°44′02″E		1262552	Simon the Pieman More images	Q26553420
Adult Education Centre and Library Including Attached Wall and Gatepiers	II	Lion Street			18 May 2001	TQ9208920333; 50°57′02″N 0°44′00″E		1271521	Upload Photo	Q26561464
4 and 5, Lion Street	II	4 and 5, Lion Street			8 August 1968	TQ9212420355; 50°57′02″N 0°44′02″E		1251876	4 and 5, Lion Street More images	Q26543800
6, Lion Street	II	6, Lion Street			8 August 1968	TQ9212220360; 50°57′02″N 0°44′02″E		1262554	6, Lion Street More images	Q26553422
7, Lion Street	II	7, Lion Street			8 August 1968	TQ9212120363; 50°57′02″N 0°44′02″E		1251877	Upload Photo	Q26543801
18-20, Lion Street	II	18-20, Lion Street			11 September 1972	TQ9212920383; 50°57′03″N 0°44′02″E		1262555	18-20, Lion Street More images	Q26553423
21, Lion Street	II	21, Lion Street			26 September 2000	TQ9213220372; 50°57′03″N 0°44′02″E		1389291	21, Lion Street More images	Q26668730
22 and 23, Lion Street	II	22 and 23, Lion Street			11 September 1972	TQ9213720360; 50°57′02″N 0°44′03″E		1262556	22 and 23, Lion Street More images	Q26553424
Rolvenden Farmhouse	II	Love Lane			11 September 1972	TQ9162421035; 50°57′25″N 0°43′38″E		1262557	Upload Photo	Q26553425
Durrant House	II	Market Street			12 October 1951	TQ9219420356; 50°57′02″N 0°44′05″E		1251879	Durrant House More images	Q26543803
The Town Hall	II*	Market Street			12 October 1951	TQ9215120332; 50°57′01″N 0°44′03″E		1251881	The Town Hall More images	Q17556095
Fllushing Inn Monks Way, 5, Market Street	II*	5, Market Street			12 October 1951	TQ9218020347; 50°57′02″N 0°44′05″E		1251880	Fllushing Inn Monks Way, 5, Market Street More images	Q17556089
6 and 7, Market Street	II	6 and 7, Market Street			12 October 1951	TQ9216220338; 50°57′02″N 0°44′04″E		1262558	6 and 7, Market Street More images	Q26553426
8, Market Street	II	8, Market Street			11 September 1972	TQ9214320349; 50°57′02″N 0°44′03″E		1262559	Upload Photo	Q26553427
9, Market Street	II	9, Market Street			11 September 1972	TQ9215120353; 50°57′02″N 0°44′03″E		1251882	Upload Photo	Q26543804
10, Market Street	II	10, Market Street			11 September 1972	TQ9215720357; 50°57′02″N 0°44′04″E		1251883	Upload Photo	Q26543805
11, Market Street	II	11, Market Street			12 October 1951	TQ9216120361; 50°57′02″N 0°44′04″E		1262560	Upload Photo	Q26553428
St Marys, 12, Market Street	II	12, Market Street			11 September 1972	TQ9216720365; 50°57′02″N 0°44′04″E		1251934	Upload Photo	Q26543850
The End House, 14, Market Street	II	14, Market Street			11 September 1972	TQ9217420370; 50°57′03″N 0°44′04″E		1251884	The End House, 14, Market Street More images	Q26543806
Mermaid Rose Cottage	II	Mermaid Passage			11 September 1972	TQ9197320342; 50°57′02″N 0°43′54″E		1251885	Upload Photo	Q26543807
Cobbled Lane Mermaid Street	II	Mermaid Passage			11 September 1972	TQ9197420323; 50°57′01″N 0°43′54″E		1251935	Upload Photo	Q26891420
Cobbled Street Mermaid Street	II	Mermaid Street			11 September 1972	TQ9195720271; 50°57′00″N 0°43′53″E		1251886	Cobbled Street Mermaid Street More images	Q26681520
Quaker's House	II	Mermaid Street			12 October 1951	TQ9194020260; 50°56′59″N 0°43′52″E		1251942	Quaker's House More images	Q7384982
Mermaid House The Mermaid Hotel	II*	Mermaid Street			12 October 1951	TQ9200820293; 50°57′00″N 0°43′56″E		1251961	Mermaid House The Mermaid Hotel More images	Q7751082
Jeake's House	II	Mermaid Street			12 October 1951	TQ9194820262; 50°56′59″N 0°43′53″E		1262511	Jeake's House More images	Q26553381
Elders House	II	Mermaid Street			12 October 1951	TQ9193220260; 50°56′59″N 0°43′52″E		1262512	Elders House More images	Q26553382
The Priest House	II	1, Mermaid Street			12 October 1951	TQ9204120290; 50°57′00″N 0°43′57″E		1262508	The Priest House More images	Q26553377
4, Mermaid Street	II	4, Mermaid Street			12 October 1951	TQ9202120280; 50°57′00″N 0°43′56″E		1251937	4, Mermaid Street More images	Q26543853
5 and 6, Mermaid Street	II	5 and 6, Mermaid Street			12 October 1951	TQ9200720273; 50°57′00″N 0°43′56″E		1251938	5 and 6, Mermaid Street More images	Q26543854
7, Mermaid Street	II	7, Mermaid Street			12 October 1951	TQ9200020272; 50°57′00″N 0°43′55″E		1262509	7, Mermaid Street More images	Q26553378
Mermaid Cottage , 8, Mermaid Street	II	8, Mermaid Street			12 October 1951	TQ9199320270; 50°57′00″N 0°43′55″E		1251939	Mermaid Cottage , 8, Mermaid Street More images	Q26543855
Robin Hill	II	10 and 11, Mermaid Street			12 October 1951	TQ9198420268; 50°57′00″N 0°43′55″E		1262510	Robin Hill More images	Q26553379
12 and 13, Mermaid Street	II	12 and 13, Mermaid Street			12 October 1951	TQ9197420266; 50°56′59″N 0°43′54″E		1251940	12 and 13, Mermaid Street More images	Q26543856
14 and 15, Mermaid Street	II	14 and 15, Mermaid Street			12 October 1951	TQ9196620265; 50°56′59″N 0°43′54″E		1251941	14 and 15, Mermaid Street More images	Q26543857
21-29, Mermaid Street	II	21-29, Mermaid Street			12 October 1951	TQ9192320273; 50°57′00″N 0°43′51″E		1262518	21-29, Mermaid Street More images	Q26553387
30, Mermaid Street	II	30, Mermaid Street			12 October 1951	TQ9194520276; 50°57′00″N 0°43′53″E		1251943	30, Mermaid Street More images	Q26543859
Hartshorn House	II*	31, Mermaid Street			12 October 1951	TQ9195620280; 50°57′00″N 0°43′53″E		1251959	Hartshorn House More images	Q17556102
Knowle House	II	32, Mermaid Street			12 October 1951	TQ9197420281; 50°57′00″N 0°43′54″E		1251944	Knowle House More images	Q26543860
40 and 40a, Mermaid Street	II	40 and 40a, Mermaid Street			8 August 1968	TQ9202320296; 50°57′00″N 0°43′57″E		1262513	40 and 40a, Mermaid Street More images	Q26553383
Court Hay	II	41, Mermaid Street			12 October 1951	TQ9202820299; 50°57′00″N 0°43′57″E		1251945	Upload Photo	Q26543861
Starlock	II	Military Road			14 July 1997	TQ9248521357; 50°57′34″N 0°44′22″E		1271994	Upload Photo	Q26561873
Garage, Chauffeurs Flat And Attached Walls And Steps To Starlock,	II	Military Road			14 July 1997	TQ9251121354; 50°57′34″N 0°44′24″E		1271995	Upload Photo	Q26561874
Spring Place	II	1-11, Military Road			11 September 1972	TQ9225220856; 50°57′18″N 0°44′09″E		1251971	Upload Photo	Q26543882
14, Military Road	II	14, Military Road			11 September 1972	TQ9230621062; 50°57′25″N 0°44′13″E		1251966	Upload Photo	Q26543877
Waterloo Terrace	II	21-35, Military Road			11 September 1972	TQ9225820898; 50°57′20″N 0°44′10″E		1251970	Upload Photo	Q26543881
Rother View	II	24, Military Road			11 September 1972	TQ9240921185; 50°57′29″N 0°44′18″E		1262514	Upload Photo	Q26553384
37-67, Military Road	II	37-67, Military Road			11 September 1972	TQ9227520948; 50°57′21″N 0°44′11″E		1251969	Upload Photo	Q26543880
Cobbled Lane Ockmans Lane	II	Ockmans Lane			11 September 1972	TQ9218520422; 50°57′04″N 0°44′05″E		1251974	Upload Photo	Q26891426
Ockman Cottage	II	Ockmans Lane			11 September 1972	TQ9218920418; 50°57′04″N 0°44′05″E		1262487	Upload Photo	Q26553357
Goalthorpe	II	Point Hill			11 September 1972	TQ9228821146; 50°57′28″N 0°44′12″E		1251976	Upload Photo	Q26543887
Point Lodge	II	Point Hill			30 June 1993	TQ9229621266; 50°57′31″N 0°44′12″E		1252221	Upload Photo	Q26544109
Point Hill	II	Point Hill			30 June 1993	TQ9230121129; 50°57′27″N 0°44′12″E		1252222	Upload Photo	Q26544110
Sail Loft to Point Hill	II	Point Hill			30 June 1993	TQ9228621161; 50°57′28″N 0°44′12″E		1252223	Upload Photo	Q26544111
Dormers The Point West House	II	Point Hill			30 June 1993	TQ9225121097; 50°57′26″N 0°44′10″E		1262369	Upload Photo	Q26553248
Garage and Garden Room to Point Lodge	II	Point Hill			30 June 1993	TQ9228121252; 50°57′31″N 0°44′12″E		1262370	Upload Photo	Q26553249
Gazebo and Associated Features in the Garden of Point Hill House	II	Point Hill			11 September 1972	TQ9235621122; 50°57′27″N 0°44′15″E		1262488	Upload Photo	Q26553358
Ferry Cottage	II	Rock Channel			11 September 1972	TQ9238420341; 50°57′01″N 0°44′15″E		1251977	Upload Photo	Q26543888
King's Head Cottages The King's Head Inn	II	Rye Hill			11 September 1972	TQ9207121375; 50°57′35″N 0°44′01″E		1251979	Upload Photo	Q26543890
Mountsfield	II	Rye Hill			12 October 1951	TQ9215820938; 50°57′21″N 0°44′05″E		1262489	Upload Photo	Q26553359
Rye Signal Box	II	Rye Station			18 July 2013	TQ9187920553; 50°57′09″N 0°43′50″E		1415163	Upload Photo	Q26676434
Gatekeeper's Cottage	II	The Grove			22 September 1987	TQ9206020703; 50°57′14″N 0°43′59″E		1252167	Upload Photo	Q26531461
2-16, The Ropewalk	II	2-16, The Ropewalk			11 September 1972	TQ9210320576; 50°57′09″N 0°44′01″E		1251978	2-16, The Ropewalk More images	Q26543889
Warehouse at the North West Junction of the Strand and the Quay in the Occupation of Hinds Woodyard	II	The Strand			11 September 1972	TQ9182220252; 50°56′59″N 0°43′46″E		1252037	Warehouse at the North West Junction of the Strand and the Quay in the Occupation of Hinds Woodyard More images	Q26543941
The Old Borough Arms	II	The Strand			11 September 1972	TQ9191220237; 50°56′59″N 0°43′51″E		1252048	The Old Borough Arms More images	Q26543952
K6 Telephone Kiosk Adjacent to the Old Borough Arms Hotel	II	The Strand			25 August 1987	TQ9190320249; 50°56′59″N 0°43′50″E		1252166	K6 Telephone Kiosk Adjacent to the Old Borough Arms Hotel More images	Q26544061
The Ship Inn	II	The Strand			11 September 1972	TQ9190220206; 50°56′58″N 0°43′50″E		1262482	The Ship Inn More images	Q26553353
Premises on the North Corner of the Strand at Its Junction with the West Side of Wish Ward	II	The Strand			11 September 1972	TQ9188220262; 50°56′59″N 0°43′49″E		1262491	Premises on the North Corner of the Strand at Its Junction with the West Side of Wish Ward More images	Q26553361
Warehouses or Granaries on the West Side of the Strand and in the Occupation of Stonham and Company Agricultural Merchants and H R Clothier Agricultural and Marine Engineers and the Garden Centre	II	The Strand			11 September 1972	TQ9187120239; 50°56′59″N 0°43′49″E		1262492	Warehouses or Granaries on the West Side of the Strand and in the Occupation of Stonham and Company Agricultural Merchants and H R Clothier Agricultural and Marine Engineers and the Garden Centre More images	Q26553362
1-5, Tower Street	II	1-5, Tower Street			11 July 1991	TQ9218720598; 50°57′10″N 0°44′06″E		1262368	1-5, Tower Street More images	Q26553247
6-8, Tower Street	II	6-8, Tower Street			11 July 1991	TQ9218120591; 50°57′10″N 0°44′05″E		1252219	Upload Photo	Q26544107
9-13, Tower Street	II	9-13, Tower Street			11 July 1991	TQ9216520577; 50°57′09″N 0°44′04″E		1252220	9-13, Tower Street More images	Q26544108
The Former Wright and Pankhurst Building	II	17, Tower Street			10 September 2003	TQ9215620597; 50°57′10″N 0°44′04″E		1390719	The Former Wright and Pankhurst Building More images	Q26670100
19 and 20, Tower Street	II	19 and 20, Tower Street			11 September 1972	TQ9217820613; 50°57′10″N 0°44′05″E		1262447	19 and 20, Tower Street More images	Q26553320
21-23, Tower Street	II	21-23, Tower Street			11 September 1972	TQ9218720620; 50°57′11″N 0°44′06″E		1252049	21-23, Tower Street More images	Q26543953
Cobbled Lane Traders Passage	II	Traders Passage			11 September 1972	TQ9193120223; 50°56′58″N 0°43′52″E		1252050	Upload Photo	Q66477483
Oak Cottage	II	Traders Passage			8 August 1968	TQ9192920241; 50°56′59″N 0°43′52″E		1252051	Oak Cottage More images	Q26543955
The Old Trader Trader's Cottage	II	Traders Passage			12 October 1951	TQ9191820247; 50°56′59″N 0°43′51″E		1252052	The Old Trader Trader's Cottage More images	Q26543956
Oak House	II	Traders Passage			12 October 1951	TQ9192720249; 50°56′59″N 0°43′52″E		1262448	Oak House More images	Q26553321
Lantern Cottage	II	4, Traders Passage			11 September 1972	TQ9193420226; 50°56′58″N 0°43′52″E		1262449	Lantern Cottage More images	Q26553322
Cadborough Oast	II	Udimore Road, TN31 6AA			5 September 2018	TQ9089019802; 50°56′46″N 0°42′58″E		1456915	Upload Photo	Q66479697
Watchbell House	II	14-15, Watchbell House, TN31 7HA			8 August 1968	TQ9201620193; 50°56′57″N 0°43′56″E		1252063	Watchbell House More images	Q26543967
The Cottage	II	Watchbell Lane			11 September 1972	TQ9199720204; 50°56′57″N 0°43′55″E		1252054	Upload Photo	Q26543958
Old Rhodes	II	Watchbell Lane			11 September 1972	TQ9201920214; 50°56′58″N 0°43′56″E		1252055	Upload Photo	Q26543959
Cobbled Street Watchbell Street	II	Watchbell Street			11 September 1972	TQ9207720221; 50°56′58″N 0°43′59″E		1252056	Cobbled Street Watchbell Street More images	Q26891436
The Studio Chambers	II	Watchbell Street			12 October 1951	TQ9204120219; 50°56′58″N 0°43′57″E		1262432	The Studio Chambers More images	Q26553305
Hope Anchor Hotel	II	Former No 17 (now Part Of Hotel) And 16, Watchbell Street, TN31 7HA			8 August 1968	TQ9200720188; 50°56′57″N 0°43′56″E		1262434	Hope Anchor Hotel More images	Q26553307
RC Church of St Anthony of Padua	II	Watchbell Street			22 February 2010	TQ9206220199; 50°56′57″N 0°43′58″E		1393687	RC Church of St Anthony of Padua More images	Q24039180
1 and 2, Watchbell Street	II	1 and 2, Watchbell Street			8 August 1968	TQ9210020239; 50°56′58″N 0°44′00″E		1252058	1 and 2, Watchbell Street More images	Q26543962
3, Watchbell Street	II	3, Watchbell Street			8 August 1968	TQ9209320236; 50°56′58″N 0°44′00″E		1252076	3, Watchbell Street More images	Q26543980
4, Watchbell Street	II	4, Watchbell Street			8 August 1968	TQ9208820235; 50°56′58″N 0°44′00″E		1252060	4, Watchbell Street More images	Q26543964
The White House	II	5, Watchbell Street			8 August 1968	TQ9207920231; 50°56′58″N 0°43′59″E		1262427	The White House More images	Q26553301
6-9, Watchbell Street	II	6-9, Watchbell Street			8 August 1968	TQ9205820220; 50°56′58″N 0°43′58″E		1252061	6-9, Watchbell Street More images	Q26543965
10, Watchbell Street	II	10, Watchbell Street			8 August 1968	TQ9203820208; 50°56′58″N 0°43′57″E		1252062	10, Watchbell Street More images	Q26543966
11, Watchbell Street	II	11, Watchbell Street			12 October 1951	TQ9203420205; 50°56′57″N 0°43′57″E		1262433	11, Watchbell Street More images	Q26553306
12 and 13, Watchbell Street	II	12 and 13, Watchbell Street			8 August 1968	TQ9202820201; 50°56′57″N 0°43′57″E		1262451	12 and 13, Watchbell Street More images	Q26553324
18, Watchbell Street	II	18, Watchbell Street			8 August 1968	TQ9203220184; 50°56′57″N 0°43′57″E		1252109	18, Watchbell Street More images	Q26544011
19, Watchbell Street	II	19, Watchbell Street			12 October 1951	TQ9203720187; 50°56′57″N 0°43′57″E		1262435	19, Watchbell Street More images	Q26553308
20, 20a and 21, Watchbell Street	II	20, 20a and 21, Watchbell Street			12 October 1951	TQ9204620191; 50°56′57″N 0°43′58″E		1252110	20, 20a and 21, Watchbell Street More images	Q26544012
Gardenside, 24, Watchbell Street	II	24, Watchbell Street			8 August 1968	TQ9207420204; 50°56′57″N 0°43′59″E		1262436	Gardenside, 24, Watchbell Street More images	Q26553309
27 and 28, Watchbell Street	II	27 and 28, Watchbell Street			8 August 1968	TQ9209820220; 50°56′58″N 0°44′00″E		1252111	27 and 28, Watchbell Street More images	Q26544013
29, Watchbell Street	II	29, Watchbell Street			8 August 1968	TQ9210620224; 50°56′58″N 0°44′01″E		1252112	29, Watchbell Street More images	Q26544014
30, Watchbell Street	II	30, Watchbell Street			8 August 1968	TQ9211220227; 50°56′58″N 0°44′01″E		1262437	30, Watchbell Street More images	Q26553310
Cobbled Lane West Cliff	II	West Cliff			11 September 1972	TQ9194820200; 50°56′57″N 0°43′53″E		1252113	Upload Photo	Q66480453
Gazebo in Garden of the Tower House	II	West Street			11 September 1972	TQ9206520319; 50°57′01″N 0°43′59″E		1252116	Upload Photo	Q26544018
Lamb Cottage	II	West Street			12 October 1951	TQ9208620275; 50°57′00″N 0°44′00″E		1252120	Lamb Cottage More images	Q26544022
Lamb House	II*	West Street			12 October 1951	TQ9204820272; 50°57′00″N 0°43′58″E		1252151	Lamb House More images	Q6481033
Cobbled Street West Street	II	West Street			11 September 1972	TQ9202420329; 50°57′01″N 0°43′57″E		1262438	Cobbled Street West Street More images	Q26891925
The Tower House	II	West Street			12 October 1951	TQ9204620308; 50°57′01″N 0°43′58″E		1262439	Upload Photo	Q26553312
Norman House	II	West Street			12 October 1951	TQ9205220299; 50°57′00″N 0°43′58″E		1262440	Upload Photo	Q26553313
Kingsland House	II	1, West Street			11 September 1972	TQ9203220332; 50°57′02″N 0°43′57″E		1252114	Kingsland House More images	Q26544016
2, West Street	II	2, West Street			11 September 1972	TQ9203420326; 50°57′01″N 0°43′57″E		1252115	2, West Street More images	Q26544017
West Point, 6, West Street	II	6, West Street			12 October 1951	TQ9206820283; 50°57′00″N 0°43′59″E		1252117	West Point, 6, West Street More images	Q26544019
7 and 8, West Street	II	7 and 8, West Street			8 August 1968	TQ9208020287; 50°57′00″N 0°43′59″E		1252118	7 and 8, West Street More images	Q26544020
9, West Street	II	9, West Street			8 August 1968	TQ9208720291; 50°57′00″N 0°44′00″E		1262416	9, West Street More images	Q26553291
13, West Street	II	13, West Street			12 October 1951	TQ9203120302; 50°57′01″N 0°43′57″E		1262418	13, West Street More images	Q26553293
Twelve	II	14, West Street			12 October 1951	TQ9202720310; 50°57′01″N 0°43′57″E		1252156	Twelve More images	Q26544053
Thomas House	II	15, West Street			12 October 1951	TQ9202220318; 50°57′01″N 0°43′57″E		1262419	Thomas House More images	Q26553294
Cobble Cottage	II*	16, West Street			12 October 1951	TQ9201920326; 50°57′01″N 0°43′56″E		1252157	Cobble Cottage More images	Q17556106
17, West Street	II	17, West Street, TN31 7ES			12 October 1951	TQ9201520335; 50°57′02″N 0°43′56″E		1252163	17, West Street More images	Q26544059
Martello Tower	II	Winchelsea Road			12 October 1951	TQ9183219870; 50°56′47″N 0°43′46″E		1262420	Martello Tower More images	Q17664658
Willow Tree House	II	113, Winchelsea Road			12 October 1951	TQ9187420008; 50°56′51″N 0°43′48″E		1252158	Upload Photo	Q26544054
Warehouse (now Rye Tiles Limited)	II	Wish Ward			11 September 1972	TQ9188020274; 50°57′00″N 0°43′49″E		1252159	Upload Photo	Q26544055
The Pump	II	Wish Ward			11 September 1972	TQ9188420294; 50°57′00″N 0°43′49″E		1252160	Upload Photo	Q26544056
Portion of the Town Walls	II	Wish Ward			11 September 1972	TQ9188820292; 50°57′00″N 0°43′50″E		1252162	Portion of the Town Walls More images	Q26544058
Wish House	II	Wish Ward			11 September 1972	TQ9185020311; 50°57′01″N 0°43′48″E		1262421	Wish House More images	Q26553296
13 (The Old Stable) and No 15 (Strandgate), Wish Ward	II	15, Wish Ward			11 September 1972	TQ9189420271; 50°57′00″N 0°43′50″E		1252161	13 (The Old Stable) and No 15 (Strandgate), Wish Ward More images	Q26544057

== See also ==
- Grade I listed buildings in East Sussex
- Grade II* listed buildings in East Sussex

== Sources ==
- Antram, Nicholas; Pevsner, Nikolaus (2012) [1965], Sussex: East, The Buildings of England, New Haven and London: Yale University Press, ISBN 978-0-300-18473-0
