= Listed buildings in Battle, East Sussex =

Town in East Sussex, England

Battle is a town and civil parish in the district of Rother in East Sussex, England. It contains 171 listed buildings that are recorded in the National Heritage List for England. Of these five are grade I, seven are grade II* and 159 are grade II. A large proportion of the listed buildings are locatated alongside High Street, Upper Lake and Lower Lake.

This list is based on the information retrieved online from Historic England

== Key ==
Grade	Criteria
I	Buildings that are of exceptional interest
II*	Particularly important buildings of more than special interest
II	Buildings that are of special interest

== Listing ==
Name	Grade	Location	Type	Completed (Note: The date given is the date used by Historic England as significant for the initial building or that of an important part in the structure's description.)	Date designated	Grid ref. (Note: The grid reference is based on the British national grid reference system, sometimes known as OSGB36, used by the Ordnance Survey.) Geo-coordinates	Notes	Entry number (Note: The "List Entry Number" is a unique number assigned to each listed building and scheduled monument by Historic England.)	Image	Wikidata
Copps Hall Cottage	II	Battle Hill			13 May 1987	TQ7533215370; 50°54′40″N 0°29′34″E		1352838	Upload Photo	Q26635812
Wesleyan Chapel	II	Battle Hill			13 May 1987	TQ7530315400; 50°54′41″N 0°29′32″E		1278731	Upload Photo	Q26568026
Bach Cottage Cobbler'S Cottage	II	Battle Hill			13 May 1987	TQ7553615254; 50°54′36″N 0°29′44″E		1352839	Upload Photo	Q26635813
Gay Whispers Little Fosters Lower Fosters	II	Battle Hill			13 May 1987	TQ7550515240; 50°54′36″N 0°29′42″E		1278701	Upload Photo	Q26568002
Croft Cottage And Hopcroft	II	Battle Hill			13 May 1987	TQ7529615417; 50°54′42″N 0°29′32″E		1044243	Upload Photo	Q26296275
Grey Cottages	II	1 and 2, Battle Hill			13 May 1987	TQ7551115297; 50°54′38″N 0°29′43″E		1230200	Upload Photo	Q26523901
1, 3 And 4 Lamberts Cottages	II	1, 3 and 4 Lamberts Cottages, Battle Hill			13 May 1987	TQ7548515255; 50°54′36″N 0°29′41″E		1044244	Upload Photo	Q26296277
Mountview	II	Caldbec Hill			13 May 1987	TQ7481516554; 50°55′19″N 0°29′09″E		1044205	Upload Photo	Q26296239
Friars Holt	II	Caldbec Hill			30 January 1974	TQ7476316562; 50°55′19″N 0°29′06″E		1044204	Upload Photo	Q26296238
Barrack Farmhouse	II	Caldbec Hill			3 August 1961	TQ7493516762; 50°55′26″N 0°29′16″E		1352858	Upload Photo	Q26635831
Catslide Cottage Mill Cottage	II	Caldbec Hill			16 October 1974	TQ7477716576; 50°55′20″N 0°29′07″E		1352857	Upload Photo	Q26635830
The Old Mill	II	Caldbec Hill, Caldbec Mill			3 August 1961	TQ7472316607; 50°55′21″N 0°29′05″E		1278702	Upload Photo	Q6410960
The Old Rectory	II	Eatenden Lane, Netherfield			13 June 1991	TQ7250418680; 50°56′30″N 0°27′14″E		1274117	Upload Photo	Q26563806
The Black Horse Public House	II	Hastings Road			13 May 1987	TQ7738514228; 50°54′01″N 0°31′17″E		1278696	The Black Horse Public House More images	Q26567998
Winter Hill	II	Hastings Road			13 May 1987	TQ7700814346; 50°54′05″N 0°30′57″E		1352860	Upload Photo	Q26635833
Starrs Green Cottage	II	Hastings Road, Starrs Green			13 May 1987	TQ7587015232; 50°54′35″N 0°30′01″E		1044207	Upload Photo	Q26296241
Starrs Green House	II	Hastings Road, Starrs Green			13 May 1987	TQ7588815258; 50°54′36″N 0°30′02″E		1044206	Upload Photo	Q26296240
Hemingfold Farmhouse	II	Hastings Road			3 August 1961	TQ7733214261; 50°54′02″N 0°31′14″E		1044210	Upload Photo	Q26296244
Yew Tree	II	Hastings Road			13 May 1987	TQ7693114364; 50°54′06″N 0°30′54″E		1044208	Upload Photo	Q26296242
Hemingfold Oast Cottage	II	Hastings Road			2 July 1974	TQ7765014803; 50°54′19″N 0°31′31″E		1230271	Upload Photo	Q26523957
Hemingfold	II	Hastings Road, TN33 0TU			2 July 1974	TQ7768214795; 50°54′19″N 0°31′33″E		1044209	Upload Photo	Q26296243
The Gatehouse, Battle Abbey	I	High Street			3 August 1961	TQ7484915786; 50°54′54″N 0°29′10″E	Rebuilt 1338 in Perpendicular style.	1278698	The Gatehouse, Battle Abbey More images	Q17535279
Battle Abbey School	I	High Street			3 August 1961	TQ7490115694; 50°54′51″N 0°29′12″E		1044211	Battle Abbey School More images	Q108495476
The Precinct Wall of Battle Abbey	I	High Street			13 May 1987	TQ7497815772; 50°54′54″N 0°29′16″E		1044144	The Precinct Wall of Battle Abbey More images	Q17534924
The Former Stables of the George Hotel	II	High Street			13 May 1987	TQ7470315946; 50°55′00″N 0°29′02″E		1230373	Upload Photo	Q26524054
The Garden Walls and Gate Piers of the Almonry to the North West of the House	II	High Street			13 May 1987	TQ7463616102; 50°55′05″N 0°28′59″E		1230487	Upload Photo	Q26524163
The Ruins of Battle Abbey	I	High Street			3 August 1961	TQ7500615727; 50°54′52″N 0°29′17″E		1352861	The Ruins of Battle Abbey More images	Q810981
Battle Memorial Hall Langton House Ticehurst House	II	High Street			3 August 1961	TQ7485915871; 50°54′57″N 0°29′10″E		1278543	Battle Memorial Hall Langton House Ticehurst House More images	Q26567858
The Pilgrims Rest Restaurant	II*	1, High Street			3 August 1961	TQ7480615794; 50°54′54″N 0°29′07″E		1230278	The Pilgrims Rest Restaurant More images	Q17555947
2 and 3, High Street	II	2 and 3, High Street			3 August 1961	TQ7482015808; 50°54′55″N 0°29′08″E		1352862	2 and 3, High Street More images	Q26635834
4, High Street	II	4, High Street			3 August 1961	TQ7481615816; 50°54′55″N 0°29′08″E		1230280	4, High Street More images	Q26523965
Tudor House	II	5, High Street			13 May 1987	TQ7481415822; 50°54′55″N 0°29′08″E		1044212	Upload Photo	Q26296245
6, 7 and 7a, High Street	II	6, 7 and 7a, High Street			13 May 1987	TQ7480715837; 50°54′56″N 0°29′07″E		1230281	Upload Photo	Q26523966
8, High Street	II	8, High Street			13 May 1987	TQ7480115848; 50°54′56″N 0°29′07″E		1352863	Upload Photo	Q26635835
9 and 10, High Street	II	9 and 10, High Street			13 May 1987	TQ7479815860; 50°54′57″N 0°29′07″E		1230287	Upload Photo	Q26523971
The Ten Sixty Six Inn	II	11, High Street			13 May 1987	TQ7479515869; 50°54′57″N 0°29′07″E		1044213	Upload Photo	Q26296246
12, High Street	II	12, High Street			13 May 1987	TQ7479215874; 50°54′57″N 0°29′07″E		1230312	Upload Photo	Q26523996
13 and 13a, High Street	II	13 and 13a, High Street			13 May 1987	TQ7479015877; 50°54′57″N 0°29′07″E		1044214	Upload Photo	Q26296247
14, High Street	II	14, High Street			13 May 1987	TQ7478715887; 50°54′58″N 0°29′07″E		1278646	Upload Photo	Q26567951
Former National Westminster Bank	II	16, High Street, TN33 0AE			13 May 1987	TQ7477315902; 50°54′58″N 0°29′06″E		1044215	Upload Photo	Q26296248
Priory House Hotel	II*	17, High Street			3 August 1961	TQ7476715910; 50°54′58″N 0°29′06″E		1044216	Upload Photo	Q17555892
18a, High Street	II	18a, High Street			3 August 1961	TQ7476115917; 50°54′59″N 0°29′05″E		1230341	Upload Photo	Q26524023
18, High Street	II*	18, High Street			3 August 1961	TQ7475615924; 50°54′59″N 0°29′05″E		1044217	Upload Photo	Q17555893
20, High Street	II	20, High Street			13 May 1987	TQ7474115938; 50°54′59″N 0°29′04″E		1278653	Upload Photo	Q26567958
21, High Street	II	21, High Street			13 May 1987	TQ7473815944; 50°54′59″N 0°29′04″E		1044218	Upload Photo	Q26296249
22, High Street	II	22, High Street			3 August 1961	TQ7473615948; 50°55′00″N 0°29′04″E		1278619	Upload Photo	Q26567927
The George Hotel	II	23, High Street			3 August 1961	TQ7472915956; 50°55′00″N 0°29′04″E		1044219	Upload Photo	Q26296250
24, High Street	II	24, High Street			13 May 1987	TQ7472115966; 50°55′00″N 0°29′03″E		1352864	Upload Photo	Q26635836
25, High Street	II	25, High Street			13 May 1987	TQ7471715972; 50°55′00″N 0°29′03″E		1230389	Upload Photo	Q26524070
26, High Street	II	26, High Street			13 May 1987	TQ7471315979; 50°55′01″N 0°29′03″E		1044220	Upload Photo	Q26296251
Bull Inn	II	27, High Street, TN33 0EA			3 August 1961	TQ7470815986; 50°55′01″N 0°29′03″E		1352865	Bull Inn More images	Q26635837
28a, 28 and 29, High Street	II	28a, 28 and 29, High Street			13 May 1987	TQ7470215997; 50°55′01″N 0°29′02″E		1278631	28a, 28 and 29, High Street More images	Q26567938
32 and 33, High Street	II	32 and 33, High Street			3 August 1961	TQ7468616017; 50°55′02″N 0°29′02″E		1044221	32 and 33, High Street More images	Q26296252
34, 35 and 35a, High Street	II	34, 35 and 35a, High Street			3 August 1961	TQ7467916033; 50°55′02″N 0°29′01″E		1278634	Upload Photo	Q26567941
The Almonry	II*	38, High Street, TN33 0EA			3 August 1961	TQ7464916078; 50°55′04″N 0°29′00″E		1044222	Upload Photo	Q17555897
Bryddes	II	39 and 40, High Street			3 August 1961	TQ7463916121; 50°55′05″N 0°28′59″E		1352866	Upload Photo	Q26635838
43, High Street	II	43, High Street			13 May 1987	TQ7468116071; 50°55′04″N 0°29′01″E		1278559	Upload Photo	Q26567873
45 and 45b, High Street	II	45 and 45b, High Street			13 May 1987	TQ7468516056; 50°55′03″N 0°29′02″E		1044223	Upload Photo	Q26296253
46, High Street	II	46, High Street			13 May 1987	TQ7469016050; 50°55′03″N 0°29′02″E		1278560	Upload Photo	Q26567874
47, High Street	II	47, High Street			13 May 1987	TQ7469516042; 50°55′03″N 0°29′02″E		1352867	Upload Photo	Q26635839
49, 50 and 51, High Street	II	49, 50 and 51, High Street			13 May 1987	TQ7470616024; 50°55′02″N 0°29′03″E		1044184	Upload Photo	Q26296217
56, 57 and 58, High Street	II	56, 57 and 58, High Street			13 May 1987	TQ7472915996; 50°55′01″N 0°29′04″E		1352885	56, 57 and 58, High Street More images	Q26635856
59 and 60, High Street	II	59 and 60, High Street			13 May 1987	TQ7473715982; 50°55′01″N 0°29′04″E		1044185	59 and 60, High Street More images	Q26296218
61, 62 and 63, High Street	II	61, 62 and 63, High Street			13 May 1987	TQ7474415972; 50°55′00″N 0°29′04″E		1044186	61, 62 and 63, High Street More images	Q26296219
66, High Street	II	66, High Street			13 May 1987	TQ7476515948; 50°55′00″N 0°29′06″E		1352886	66, High Street More images	Q26635857
66a, High Street	II	66a, High Street			13 May 1987	TQ7478515967; 50°55′00″N 0°29′07″E		1044187	Upload Photo	Q26296220
67 and 67a, High Street	II	67 and 67a, High Street			13 May 1987	TQ7477015941; 50°54′59″N 0°29′06″E		1352849	67 and 67a, High Street More images	Q26635822
69 and 70, High Street	II	69 and 70, High Street			13 May 1987	TQ7478415925; 50°54′59″N 0°29′06″E		1044188	69 and 70, High Street More images	Q26296221
71 and 72, High Street	II	71 and 72, High Street			13 May 1987	TQ7479415916; 50°54′58″N 0°29′07″E		1044189	71 and 72, High Street More images	Q26296222
73, High Street	II	73, High Street			13 May 1987	TQ7480015907; 50°54′58″N 0°29′07″E		1352850	73, High Street More images	Q26635823
76 and 77, High Street	II	76 and 77, High Street			13 May 1987	TQ7481715887; 50°54′57″N 0°29′08″E		1230527	76 and 77, High Street More images	Q26524202
The Gateway	II	78, High Street			3 August 1961	TQ7482815875; 50°54′57″N 0°29′09″E		1044190	The Gateway More images	Q26296223
82, 83, 84, 85 and 86, High Street	II	82, 83, 84, 85 and 86, High Street			13 May 1987	TQ7486015841; 50°54′56″N 0°29′10″E		1352851	82, 83, 84, 85 and 86, High Street More images	Q26635824
Abbey Green Cottage Market Green Cottage	II	88, High Street			3 August 1961	TQ7487815823; 50°54′55″N 0°29′11″E		1278523	Abbey Green Cottage Market Green Cottage More images	Q26567839
89 and 90, High Street	II	89 and 90, High Street			3 August 1961	TQ7489315815; 50°54′55″N 0°29′12″E		1044191	89 and 90, High Street More images	Q26296224
Senlac House	II	91, High Street			13 May 1987	TQ7491215808; 50°54′55″N 0°29′13″E		1044192	Senlac House More images	Q26296226
The Olde House	II	92 and 93, High Street			3 August 1961	TQ7492615801; 50°54′55″N 0°29′13″E		1278268	The Olde House More images	Q26567610
Olde Church House	II	94, High Street			13 May 1987	TQ7494215796; 50°54′54″N 0°29′14″E		1352852	Olde Church House More images	Q26635825
Foxhole Farmhouse	II	Kane Hythe, Foxhole Farm			13 May 1987	TQ7178817103; 50°55′40″N 0°26′35″E		1231128	Upload Photo	Q26524749
Granary and Oasthouse at Great Beech to the North East of the House	II	Kane Hythe, Great Beech			20 May 1976	TQ7231716340; 50°55′15″N 0°27′01″E		1044193	Upload Photo	Q26296227
Great Beech	II	Kane Hythe, Great Beech			3 August 1961	TQ7230416322; 50°55′14″N 0°27′00″E		1231126	Upload Photo	Q26524747
The Cottage	II	London Road			13 May 1987	TQ7451316917; 50°55′31″N 0°28′54″E		1044194	Upload Photo	Q26296228
1 and 2, Lower Lake	II	1 and 2, Lower Lake			3 August 1961	TQ7519515705; 50°54′51″N 0°29′27″E		1278275	Upload Photo	Q26567617
10, Lower Lake	II	10, Lower Lake			13 May 1987	TQ7522215675; 50°54′50″N 0°29′28″E		1044195	Upload Photo	Q26296229
13, 14, 15 and 16, Lower Lake	II	13, 14, 15 and 16, Lower Lake			13 May 1987	TQ7524415639; 50°54′49″N 0°29′29″E		1231150	Upload Photo	Q26524767
Lake Cottage	II	27, Lower Lake			13 May 1987	TQ7525015571; 50°54′47″N 0°29′30″E		1044196	Upload Photo	Q26296230
29, Lower Lake	II	29, Lower Lake			13 May 1987	TQ7524115597; 50°54′48″N 0°29′29″E		1044197	Upload Photo	Q26296231
30-37, Lower Lake	II	30-37, Lower Lake			5 November 1985	TQ7522915614; 50°54′48″N 0°29′29″E		1231158	Upload Photo	Q26524776
41 and 42, Lower Lake	II	41 and 42, Lower Lake			13 May 1987	TQ7521315643; 50°54′49″N 0°29′28″E		1278244	Upload Photo	Q26567588
44 and 45, Lower Lake	II	44 and 45, Lower Lake, TN33 0AT			3 August 1961	TQ7520615656; 50°54′50″N 0°29′28″E		1044198	Upload Photo	Q26296232
Oasthouses with Attached Stowage at Blackfriars Farm	II	Marley Lane			9 June 1999	TQ7605115762; 50°54′52″N 0°30′11″E		1387294	Upload Photo	Q26666953
Blackfriars Stuart House	II	Marley Lane, Blackfriars			13 May 1987	TQ7601415735; 50°54′51″N 0°30′09″E		1352853	Upload Photo	Q26635826
Greatwood Cottage	II	Marley Lane, Greatwood			30 March 1987	TQ7620015917; 50°54′57″N 0°30′19″E		1231187	Upload Photo	Q26524802
Former Battle Primary School	II	Marley Lane			16 February 1987	TQ7535515770; 50°54′53″N 0°29′35″E		1231165	Upload Photo	Q26524783
Battle Great Barn	II	Marley Lane, Marley House			15 November 1985	TQ7664916534; 50°55′16″N 0°30′43″E		1278258	Upload Photo	Q26567600
Marley House	II	Marley Lane, Marley House			3 August 1961	TQ7658616542; 50°55′17″N 0°30′40″E		1044199	Upload Photo	Q26296233
Forge Cottage Peppers	II	Mount Street			13 May 1987	TQ7472416065; 50°55′03″N 0°29′04″E		1352876	Upload Photo	Q26635848
Little Park Farmhouse	II	Mount Street, Little Park Farm			13 May 1987	TQ7526016146; 50°55′05″N 0°29′31″E		1352874	Upload Photo	Q26635846
Anvil Cottage (at Rear of No 35 Slatters)	II	Mount Street			1 October 1987	TQ7473816069; 50°55′03″N 0°29′04″E		1238393	Upload Photo	Q26531454
Slatters	II	Mount Street			13 May 1987	TQ7472816073; 50°55′04″N 0°29′04″E		1044167	Upload Photo	Q26296201
The King's Head Inn	II	Mount Street			13 May 1987	TQ7472216054; 50°55′03″N 0°29′03″E		1044168	Upload Photo	Q26296202
The Zion Chapel	II	Mount Street			13 May 1987	TQ7472616146; 50°55′06″N 0°29′04″E		1352856	Upload Photo	Q26635829
Lewins Croft	II*	Mount Street			3 August 1961	TQ7475916194; 50°55′07″N 0°29′06″E		1044164	Upload Photo	Q17555888
1, Mount Street	II	1, Mount Street			13 May 1987	TQ7470016051; 50°55′03″N 0°29′02″E		1044200	Upload Photo	Q26296234
2, 3 and 4, Mount Street	II	2, 3 and 4, Mount Street			13 May 1987	TQ7470616065; 50°55′03″N 0°29′03″E		1231198	Upload Photo	Q26524812
5, Mount Street	II	5, Mount Street			13 May 1987	TQ7470816072; 50°55′04″N 0°29′03″E		1352854	Upload Photo	Q26635827
6a and 6b, Mount Street	II	6a and 6b, Mount Street			13 May 1987	TQ7471016079; 50°55′04″N 0°29′03″E		1278224	Upload Photo	Q26567570
7 and 8, Mount Street	II	7 and 8, Mount Street			13 May 1987	TQ7471416088; 50°55′04″N 0°29′03″E		1044201	Upload Photo	Q26296235
9, Mount Street	II	9, Mount Street			13 May 1987	TQ7471916097; 50°55′04″N 0°29′03″E		1352855	Upload Photo	Q26635828
10, 11 and 12, Mount Street	II	10, 11 and 12, Mount Street			3 August 1961	TQ7472316111; 50°55′05″N 0°29′04″E		1231205	Upload Photo	Q26524818
13, Mount Street	II	13, Mount Street			13 May 1987	TQ7472616117; 50°55′05″N 0°29′04″E		1044202	Upload Photo	Q26296236
The Hollies Presbytery	II	14, Mount Street			3 August 1961	TQ7472516130; 50°55′05″N 0°29′04″E		1278229	Upload Photo	Q26567575
15, 16 and 17, Mount Street	II	15, 16 and 17, Mount Street			13 May 1987	TQ7473416204; 50°55′08″N 0°29′04″E		1278232	Upload Photo	Q26567577
18, Mount Street	II	18, Mount Street			13 May 1987	TQ7473616217; 50°55′08″N 0°29′04″E		1044203	Upload Photo	Q26296237
19 and 20, Mount Street	II	19 and 20, Mount Street			13 May 1987	TQ7473716225; 50°55′09″N 0°29′05″E		1231273	Upload Photo	Q26524881
The Old Court House	II	21, Mount Street			3 August 1961	TQ7473716247; 50°55′09″N 0°29′05″E		1044163	Upload Photo	Q26296198
26 and 26a, Mount Street	II	26 and 26a, Mount Street			3 August 1961	TQ7474716129; 50°55′05″N 0°29′05″E		1044165	Upload Photo	Q26296199
27 and 27a, Mount Street	II	27 and 27a, Mount Street			17 August 1973	TQ7474416119; 50°55′05″N 0°29′05″E		1352875	Upload Photo	Q26635847
31, Mount Street	II	31, Mount Street			13 May 1987	TQ7473816097; 50°55′04″N 0°29′04″E		1044166	Upload Photo	Q26296200
38, Mount Street	II	38, Mount Street			13 May 1987	TQ7471816043; 50°55′03″N 0°29′03″E		1352877	Upload Photo	Q26635849
Darwell Beach	II	Darwell Hill (b2096), Netherfield, TN33 9QL			16 August 1979	TQ7063318895; 50°56′39″N 0°25′39″E		1275859	Upload Photo	Q26565415
Gaynes	II	Netherfield Road, Netherfield			16 February 1987	TQ7444616708; 50°55′24″N 0°28′51″E		1352879	Upload Photo	Q26635851
Doctor's Cottage	II	Netherfield Road, Netherfield			13 May 1987	TQ6977219006; 50°56′44″N 0°24′55″E		1278145	Upload Photo	Q26567496
Stonywood Cottage	II	Netherfield Road, Netherfield			13 May 1987	TQ7145118570; 50°56′28″N 0°26′20″E		1278160	Upload Photo	Q26567510
Church of St John	II*	Netherfield Road, Netherfield			13 May 1987	TQ7231918526; 50°56′26″N 0°27′05″E		1278194	Upload Photo	Q17556160
Netherfield Primary School and the Schoolmasters House	II	Netherfield Road, Netherfield			13 May 1987	TQ7235618524; 50°56′25″N 0°27′07″E		1044169	Upload Photo	Q26296203
Ivyland Farmhouse	II	Netherfield Road, Ivyland Farm			13 May 1987	TQ7125218484; 50°56′25″N 0°26′10″E		1044170	Upload Photo	Q26296204
Doctor's Farmhouse	II	Netherfield Road, Doctor's Farm			3 August 1961	TQ6964319050; 50°56′45″N 0°24′49″E		1044171	Upload Photo	Q26296205
Nethercote	II	Netherfield Road, Netherfield			13 May 1987	TQ7353117576; 50°55′54″N 0°28′05″E		1044174	Upload Photo	Q26296208
Stream House	II	Netherfield Road, Netherfield			13 May 1987	TQ7413017066; 50°55′36″N 0°28′35″E		1044173	Upload Photo	Q26296207
White Cottage	II	Netherfield Road, Netherfield			13 May 1987	TQ7255618166; 50°56′14″N 0°27′16″E		1044176	Upload Photo	Q26296210
Beech Farmhouse	II	Netherfield Road, Beech Farm			3 August 1961	TQ7319716611; 50°55′23″N 0°27′46″E		1278122	Upload Photo	Q26567477
The Gun House	II	Netherfield Road, Netherfield			13 May 1987	TQ7061918818; 50°56′37″N 0°25′38″E		1231366	Upload Photo	Q26524965
Clarendon	II	Netherfield Road, Netherfield			13 May 1987	TQ7446216567; 50°55′20″N 0°28′51″E		1231374	Upload Photo	Q26524973
Star Cottage	II	Netherfield Road, Netherfield			13 May 1987	TQ7349917594; 50°55′54″N 0°28′04″E		1231410	Upload Photo	Q26525007
The Old Thatch	II	Netherfield Road, Netherfield			13 May 1987	TQ7335717662; 50°55′56″N 0°27′56″E		1044175	Upload Photo	Q26296209
Le Rette Cottage	II	Netherfield Road, Le Rette			13 May 1987	TQ7419417054; 50°55′36″N 0°28′38″E		1044172	Upload Photo	Q26296206
Ashes Lodge	II	Netherfield Road, Netherfield			13 May 1987	TQ7268418022; 50°56′09″N 0°27′23″E		1278127	Upload Photo	Q26567482
Le Rette Farmhouse	II	Netherfield Road, Le Rette Farm			3 August 1961	TQ7418817544; 50°55′52″N 0°28′39″E		1231389	Upload Photo	Q26524987
Darwell Hill Cottages	II	1 and 2, Netherfield Road, Netherfield			13 May 1987	TQ7035418902; 50°56′40″N 0°25′25″E		1352878	Upload Photo	Q26635850
Battle Lodge And Gate Piers, Gates And Boundary Wall, Ashburnham Place	II	North Trade Road			17 August 1973	TQ7229915999; 50°55′04″N 0°26′59″E		1231450	Upload Photo	Q26525044
Battle Hospital Including Perimeter Wall	II	North Trade Road			1 October 1987	TQ7314015954; 50°55′01″N 0°27′42″E		1238394	Upload Photo	Q26531455
Squirrel Farmhouse	II	North Trade Road			13 May 1987	TQ7233415966; 50°55′03″N 0°27′01″E		1352880	Upload Photo	Q26635852
North Lodge	II	North Trade Road, North Lodge			3 August 1961	TQ7344315946; 50°55′01″N 0°27′58″E		1044177	Upload Photo	Q26296211
Beacon Cottage	II	North Trade Road			13 May 1987	TQ7337515899; 50°54′59″N 0°27′54″E		1231440	Upload Photo	Q26525034
Lower Almonry Farmhouse	II	North Trade Road			3 August 1961	TQ7391015791; 50°54′55″N 0°28′22″E		1231433	Upload Photo	Q26525029
K6 Telephone Kiosk	II	Park Lane			1 October 1987	TQ7482215782; 50°54′54″N 0°29′08″E		1238395	Upload Photo	Q26531456
1 and 2, Park Lane	II	1 and 2, Park Lane			13 May 1987	TQ7477315800; 50°54′55″N 0°29′06″E		1044178	Upload Photo	Q26296212
Powdermill House Powdermill Hotel Formerly Listed As Powdermill House	II	Powdermill Lane, Powdermill House			13 May 1987	TQ7421514610; 50°54′17″N 0°28′35″E		1231456	Upload Photo	Q26525050
Battle War Memorial	II	St Mary The Virgin Churchyard, Upper Lake, TN33 0AN			29 May 2018	TQ7499615788; 50°54′54″N 0°29′17″E		1453482	Battle War Memorial More images	Q66479401
Battle Station	II	Station Approach, Battle Station			13 May 1987	TQ7547915573; 50°54′47″N 0°29′41″E		1044179	Battle Station More images	Q4873077
Telham High Farmhouse	II	Telham Lane			3 August 1961	TQ7656114045; 50°53′56″N 0°30′34″E		1352881	Upload Photo	Q26635853
Lower Telham Farmhouse	II	Telham Lane, Lower Telham			13 May 1987	TQ7504014098; 50°53′59″N 0°29′16″E		1278107	Upload Photo	Q26567465
Peppering Eye Farmhouse	II	Telham Lane, Peppering Eye Farm			3 August 1961	TQ7439913952; 50°53′55″N 0°28′43″E		1044180	Upload Photo	Q26296213
Lake House	II	Upper Lake			13 May 1987	TQ7519315718; 50°54′52″N 0°29′27″E		1044182	Upload Photo	Q26296215
Ye Olde Chequers Inn	II	Upper Lake			13 May 1987	TQ7517015705; 50°54′51″N 0°29′26″E		1231556	Upload Photo	Q26525141
The Deanery Including the Former Stables	II*	Upper Lake			3 August 1961	TQ7502415850; 50°54′56″N 0°29′19″E		1352882	Upload Photo	Q17556174
The Parish Church of St Mary	I	Upper Lake			3 August 1961	TQ7502615798; 50°54′54″N 0°29′19″E		1231477	The Parish Church of St Mary More images	Q17535039
1, Upper Lake	II	1, Upper Lake			3 August 1961	TQ7507115758; 50°54′53″N 0°29′21″E		1231530	Upload Photo	Q26525115
2, Upper Lake	II	2, Upper Lake			19 April 1985	TQ7510015754; 50°54′53″N 0°29′22″E		1044181	Upload Photo	Q26296214
3, Upper Lake	II	3, Upper Lake			13 May 1987	TQ7510815745; 50°54′53″N 0°29′23″E		1231536	Upload Photo	Q26525121
Abbot'S Cottage	II	5, Upper Lake			3 August 1961	TQ7511715742; 50°54′52″N 0°29′23″E		1352883	Upload Photo	Q26635854
6, 8 and 10, Upper Lake	II	6, 8 and 10, Upper Lake			13 May 1987	TQ7513515739; 50°54′52″N 0°29′24″E		1278067	Upload Photo	Q26567432
Pyke House	II	13, 14 and 15, Upper Lake			3 August 1961	TQ7515015708; 50°54′51″N 0°29′25″E		1044183	Upload Photo	Q26296216
16, Upper Lake	II	16, Upper Lake			3 August 1961	TQ7513215716; 50°54′52″N 0°29′24″E		1352884	Upload Photo	Q26635855
The White Horse Cottage	II	18 and 19, Upper Lake			3 August 1961	TQ7512515718; 50°54′52″N 0°29′24″E		1352900	Upload Photo	Q26635870
The Monks Cottage	II	20, 21 and 22, Upper Lake			3 August 1961	TQ7510515724; 50°54′52″N 0°29′23″E		1044143	Upload Photo	Q26296179
23, Upper Lake	II	23, Upper Lake			3 August 1961	TQ7508615717; 50°54′52″N 0°29′22″E		1352901	Upload Photo	Q26635871
1 and 2, Wattles Wish	II	1 and 2, Wattles Wish			13 May 1987	TQ7440716852; 50°55′29″N 0°28′49″E		1352902	Upload Photo	Q26635872
Gate Farmhouse	II	Whatlington Road, Gate Farm			3 August 1961	TQ7507717329; 50°55′44″N 0°29′24″E		1044145	Upload Photo	Q26296181
No 4 Loose Farm Cottages	II	TN33 0TG			17 August 2017	TQ7612914683; 50°54′17″N 0°30′13″E		1438900	Upload Photo	Q66478045

== See also ==
- Grade I listed buildings in East Sussex
- Grade II* listed buildings in East Sussex

== Sources ==
- Antram, Nicholas; Pevsner, Nikolaus (2012) [1965], Sussex: East, The Buildings of England, New Haven and London: Yale University Press, ISBN 978-0-300-18473-0
