= Listed buildings in Northiam =

Civil Parish in East Sussex, England

Northiam is a village and civil parish in the Rother district, in East Sussex, England It contains one grade I, 23 grade II* and 546 grade II listed buildings that are recorded in the National Heritage List for England.

This list is based on the information retrieved online from Historic England.

== Key ==
Grade	Criteria
I	Buildings that are of exceptional interest
II*	Particularly important buildings of more than special interest
II	Buildings that are of special interest

== Listing ==
Name	Grade	Location	Type	Completed (Note: The date given is the date used by Historic England as significant for the initial building or that of an important part in the structure's description.)	Date designated	Grid ref. (Note: The grid reference is based on the British national grid reference system, sometimes known as OSGB36, used by the Ordnance Survey.) Geo-coordinates	Notes	Entry number (Note: The "List Entry Number" is a unique number assigned to each listed building and scheduled monument by Historic England.)	Image	Wikidata
Wildings	II	Beales Lane			13 May 1987	TQ8309325014; 50°59′43″N 0°36′28″E		1235016	Upload Photo	Q26528380
Barn at Wildings	II	Beales Lane			20 February 1987	TQ8305825030; 50°59′44″N 0°36′26″E		1235018	Upload Photo	Q26528382
Clench Green	II	Beales Lane			3 August 1961	TQ8262024984; 50°59′43″N 0°36′04″E		1275824	Upload Photo	Q26565382
Barn at Yew Tree Farm to the North West of the Farmhouse	II	Beckley Road, Yew Tree Farm			15 May 1985	TQ8296322671; 50°58′28″N 0°36′17″E		1275785	Upload Photo	Q26565345
Morley Farm Cottage	II	Beckley Road, Morley Farm			13 May 1987	TQ8286722652; 50°58′27″N 0°36′12″E		1235017	Upload Photo	Q26528381
Great Stent Farmhouse	II	Beckley Road, Great Stent Farm			13 May 1987	TQ8322422242; 50°58′14″N 0°36′30″E		1235019	Upload Photo	Q26528383
Morley Farmhouse	II	Beckley Road, Morley Farm			3 August 1961	TQ8281222657; 50°58′28″N 0°36′09″E		1275825	Upload Photo	Q26565383
Yew Tree Farmhouse (mary Mason's Tea House)	II	Beckley Road, Yew Tree Farm			3 August 1961	TQ8294222653; 50°58′27″N 0°36′16″E		1275826	Upload Photo	Q26565384
Stream Cottage And Numbers 3 And 4 Stream Cottages	II	Beckley Road			13 May 1987	TQ8336622999; 50°58′38″N 0°36′38″E		1235087	Upload Photo	Q26528441
Church House	II*	Church Lane			3 August 1961	TQ8306224552; 50°59′29″N 0°36′26″E		1235021	Upload Photo	Q17556046
Barn at Church House to the North East of the House	II	Church Lane			13 May 1987	TQ8309724558; 50°59′29″N 0°36′27″E		1275828	Upload Photo	Q26565385
The Old School House	II	Church Lane			3 August 1961	TQ8296424525; 50°59′28″N 0°36′20″E		1235091	Upload Photo	Q26528445
Barn to North West of Goteley Old Manor	II	Church Lane			13 May 1987	TQ8335024810; 50°59′37″N 0°36′41″E		1235101	Upload Photo	Q26528455
The Parish Church of St Mary (including the Frewen Mausoleum)	II*	Church Lane			3 August 1961	TQ8300824517; 50°59′27″N 0°36′23″E		1275827	Upload Photo	Q17556134
Goteley Old Manor	II	Church Lane			3 August 1961	TQ8336324774; 50°59′35″N 0°36′41″E		1235022	Upload Photo	Q26528385
Silverden Manor	II	Church Lane			3 August 1961	TQ8317624757; 50°59′35″N 0°36′32″E		1235096	Upload Photo	Q26528450
Coplands	II	Dixter Lane			3 August 1961	TQ8256425538; 51°00′01″N 0°36′02″E		1275829	Upload Photo	Q26565386
Fig Tree Cottage Pear Tree Cottage	II	Dixter Road			13 May 1987	TQ8237125068; 50°59′46″N 0°35′51″E		1216703	Upload Photo	Q26511468
The Little Shop Virginia Cottage	II	Dixter Road			13 May 1987	TQ8254124869; 50°59′39″N 0°35′59″E		1275830	Upload Photo	Q26565387
Higham Cottage	II	Dixter Road			13 May 1987	TQ8209025064; 50°59′46″N 0°35′37″E		1275832	Upload Photo	Q26565389
Blundells	II	Dixter Road			13 May 1987	TQ8253724848; 50°59′39″N 0°35′59″E		1235023	Upload Photo	Q26528386
The Unitarian Chapel	II	Dixter Road			13 May 1987	TQ8237725019; 50°59′44″N 0°35′51″E		1235024	Upload Photo	Q26528387
Longridge Longridge Cottage	II	Dixter Road			13 May 1987	TQ8252624933; 50°59′41″N 0°35′59″E		1216699	Upload Photo	Q26511464
Chapelfield Cottage	II	Dixter Road			13 May 1987	TQ8233025056; 50°59′46″N 0°35′49″E		1235025	Upload Photo	Q26528388
Park Corner Park House	II	Dixter Road			3 August 1961	TQ8248124924; 50°59′41″N 0°35′56″E		1216700	Upload Photo	Q26511465
Rose Cottage	II	Dixter Road			13 May 1987	TQ8256224836; 50°59′38″N 0°36′00″E		1275797	Upload Photo	Q26892662
Domains	II	Dixter Road			3 August 1961	TQ8216625072; 50°59′46″N 0°35′41″E		1275831	Upload Photo	Q26565388
Higham Farmhouse	II	Dixter Road, Higham Farm			3 August 1961	TQ8210025027; 50°59′45″N 0°35′37″E		1275779	Upload Photo	Q26565339
Clare Reed Opticians and J Perigoe and Son, funeral directors	II	Dixter Road, Rye, TN31 6LB			20 June 1989	TQ8251724893; 50°59′40″N 0°35′58″E		1274135	Upload Photo	Q26563821
Doucegrove Farmhouse	II	Doucegrove Lane			3 August 1961	TQ8247221613; 50°57′54″N 0°35′50″E		1216855	Upload Photo	Q26511607
Colnhurst	II	Ewhurst Lane			13 May 1987	TQ8250124887; 50°59′40″N 0°35′57″E		1235027	Upload Photo	Q26528389
Former Stables at Tufton Place to North of the House	II	Ewhurst Lane, Tufton Place			13 May 1987	TQ8145623651; 50°59′01″N 0°35′02″E		1235031	Upload Photo	Q26528393
Hall Cottage	II	Ewhurst Lane			13 May 1987	TQ8247024865; 50°59′39″N 0°35′56″E		1275701	Upload Photo	Q26565263
Strawberry Hole	II*	Ewhurst Lane, Strawberry Hole			3 August 1961	TQ8208724143; 50°59′16″N 0°35′35″E		1235029	Upload Photo	Q17556049
Outbuilding at Tufton Place to the North West of the House and to the West of the Former Stables	II	Ewhurst Lane, Tufton Place			13 May 1987	TQ8142823648; 50°59′01″N 0°35′00″E		1235032	Upload Photo	Q26528394
Barn in the Grounds of Strawberry Oast to the South West of the House	II	Ewhurst Lane			13 May 1987	TQ8211924137; 50°59′16″N 0°35′36″E		1235030	Upload Photo	Q26528392
Strawberry Oast	II	Ewhurst Lane			13 May 1987	TQ8214124160; 50°59′17″N 0°35′38″E		1216867	Upload Photo	Q26511618
Tufton Place	II	Ewhurst Lane, Tufton Place			13 May 1987	TQ8144723623; 50°59′00″N 0°35′01″E		1216876	Upload Photo	Q26511627
Two Barns at Tufton Place to the North of the Former Stables	II	Ewhurst Lane, Tufton Place			13 May 1987	TQ8147423698; 50°59′03″N 0°35′03″E		1216879	Upload Photo	Q26511630
The Cottage	II	1, Ewhurst Lane			13 May 1987	TQ8248224896; 50°59′40″N 0°35′56″E		1235028	Upload Photo	Q26528390
Carriers Farmhouse	II	Hasting Road, Carriers Farm			3 August 1961	TQ8292923835; 50°59′05″N 0°36′17″E		1216884	Upload Photo	Q26511635
Shoreham Cottage	II	Hastings Road			13 May 1987	TQ8266022889; 50°58′35″N 0°36′02″E		1235035	Upload Photo	Q26528397
Sherbourne Bridge Cottage	II	Hastings Road			13 May 1987	TQ8275423028; 50°58′40″N 0°36′07″E		1275673	Upload Photo	Q26565237
Greensleeves	II	Hastings Road			13 May 1987	TQ8229422315; 50°58′17″N 0°35′42″E		1275676	Upload Photo	Q26565240
Barn and Oasthouse at Tanhouse Farm to the South West of the Farmhouse	II	Hastings Road			1 October 1986	TQ8222521814; 50°58′01″N 0°35′38″E		1275677	Upload Photo	Q26565241
Carriers Oast	II	Hastings Road			13 May 1987	TQ8288923822; 50°59′05″N 0°36′15″E		1275833	Upload Photo	Q26565390
Monkings	II	Hastings Road			13 May 1987	TQ8218821990; 50°58′07″N 0°35′36″E		1216893	Upload Photo	Q26511644
Glebe Cottage	II	Hastings Road			13 May 1987	TQ8296423926; 50°59′08″N 0°36′19″E		1235033	Upload Photo	Q26528395
The Thatched Cottage	II	Hastings Road			13 May 1987	TQ8238422373; 50°58′19″N 0°35′47″E		1216892	Upload Photo	Q26511643
Perryman's Cross	II	Hastings Road			3 August 1961	TQ8284123440; 50°58′53″N 0°36′12″E		1235034	Upload Photo	Q26528396
Tanhouse Farmhouse	II	Hastings Road			3 August 1961	TQ8225321827; 50°58′01″N 0°35′39″E		1216894	Upload Photo	Q26511645
Wellhouse	II	Hastings Road, Wellhouse			3 August 1961	TQ8267922806; 50°58′32″N 0°36′03″E		1275675	Upload Photo	Q26565239
Wellhouse Cottages	II	1 and 2, Hastings Road			3 August 1961	TQ8265022858; 50°58′34″N 0°36′01″E		1216890	Upload Photo	Q26511641
Beacon Cottage Beacon House	II	High Park			13 May 1987	TQ8225125242; 50°59′52″N 0°35′45″E		1275629	Upload Photo	Q26565196
Little Dixter	II	High Park, Little Dixter			3 August 1961	TQ8172725191; 50°59′51″N 0°35′18″E		1216901	Upload Photo	Q26511651
The Mill House	II	High Park			11 August 1972	TQ8225925174; 50°59′50″N 0°35′46″E		1216950	Upload Photo	Q26511701
East Cottage West Cottage	II	High Park			13 May 1987	TQ8219225209; 50°59′51″N 0°35′42″E		1216898	Upload Photo	Q26511649
Great Dixter	I	High Park, Great Dixter			3 August 1961	TQ8196825105; 50°59′48″N 0°35′30″E		1216957	Great Dixter More images	Q5599070
The Garage Of The Mill House	II	High Park			13 May 1987	TQ8229725155; 50°59′49″N 0°35′47″E		1216897	Upload Photo	Q26511648
Apple Tree Cottage	II	High Park			11 August 1972	TQ8227725136; 50°59′48″N 0°35′46″E		1216896	Upload Photo	Q26511647
Oasthouses And Barn At Great Dixter To The North West Of The House	II*	High Park, Great Dixter			20 May 1976	TQ8195725164; 50°59′50″N 0°35′30″E		1216899	Oasthouses And Barn At Great Dixter To The North West Of The House More images	Q96251170
1, 2 And 3, High Park	II	1, 2 and 3, High Park			13 May 1987	TQ8224625151; 50°59′49″N 0°35′45″E		1216895	Upload Photo	Q26511646
4, High Park	II	4, High Park			11 August 1972	TQ8226425138; 50°59′48″N 0°35′46″E		1275678	Upload Photo	Q26565242
Barn, Now Garages, At Great Dixter To The North Of The House	II	High Park, Great Dixter			13 May 1987	TQ8198725165; 50°59′50″N 0°35′32″E		1216900	Upload Photo	Q26511650
Hayes Farmhouse	II	Main Street, Hayes Farm			13 May 1987	TQ8303024366; 50°59′23″N 0°36′24″E		1275641	Upload Photo	Q26565207
The Village Green Crafts Centre	II	Main Street			13 May 1987	TQ8291024469; 50°59′26″N 0°36′18″E		1275683	Upload Photo	Q26565247
The Rosary	II	Main Street			30 June 1970	TQ8303524274; 50°59′20″N 0°36′24″E		1275638	Upload Photo	Q26565205
The Peringoe Workshop Museum	II	Main Street			13 May 1987	TQ8275524651; 50°59′32″N 0°36′10″E		1275647	Upload Photo	Q26565213
The White House	II	Main Street			13 May 1987	TQ8267124721; 50°59′34″N 0°36′06″E		1275681	Upload Photo	Q26565245
The Muddy Duck	II	Main Street, Rye, TN31 6LP			13 May 1987	TQ8261424832; 50°59′38″N 0°36′03″E		1275682	Upload Photo	Q26565246
Cherry Orchard Cherry Orchard Cottage Cherry Orchard Cottages	II	Main Street			13 May 1987	TQ8279124658; 50°59′32″N 0°36′12″E		1216906	Upload Photo	Q26511656
Old Wheelwrights	II	Main Street			13 May 1987	TQ8299924326; 50°59′21″N 0°36′22″E		1216909	Upload Photo	Q26511659
Elmside	II	Main Street			13 May 1987	TQ8285624554; 50°59′29″N 0°36′15″E		1216911	Upload Photo	Q26511662
Oakside	II*	Main Street			3 August 1961	TQ8294424475; 50°59′26″N 0°36′19″E		1216981	Upload Photo	Q17555901
Anchorage	II	Main Street			13 May 1987	TQ8300224319; 50°59′21″N 0°36′22″E		1217026	Upload Photo	Q26511768
Former National Westminster Bank	II	Main Street, Rye, TN31 6LP			13 May 1987	TQ8264624757; 50°59′36″N 0°36′05″E		1216907	Upload Photo	Q26511657
Hayes Arms Hotel	II	Main Street			13 May 1987	TQ8298524469; 50°59′26″N 0°36′21″E		1216905	Hayes Arms Hotel More images	Q26511655
Rose Cottage	II	Main Street			13 May 1987	TQ8289624479; 50°59′26″N 0°36′17″E		1216910	Upload Photo	Q26511660
Winton	II	Main Street			13 May 1987	TQ8280124623; 50°59′31″N 0°36′12″E		1217042	Upload Photo	Q26511784
Foxes The Premises Occupied By Hairtique Hairdresser Warwick House	II	Main Street			13 May 1987	TQ8262624798; 50°59′37″N 0°36′04″E		1217021	Upload Photo	Q26511763
Sunnyside	II	Main Street			13 May 1987	TQ8303424288; 50°59′20″N 0°36′24″E		1216903	Upload Photo	Q26511653
Former Northiam Post Office With The House Attached	II	Main Street, Rye, TN31 6LA			13 May 1987	TQ8256524810; 50°59′37″N 0°36′01″E		1216913	Upload Photo	Q26511664
Northiam War Memorial	II	Main Street			22 June 2010	TQ8295724452; 50°59′25″N 0°36′20″E		1393848	Upload Photo	Q26672986
Clinch Green Cottage	II	Main Street			13 May 1987	TQ8259124862; 50°59′39″N 0°36′02″E		1217210	Upload Photo	Q26511939
Eaton House Timber House Walnut Tree House	II	Main Street			3 August 1961	TQ8292924406; 50°59′24″N 0°36′18″E		1217031	Upload Photo	Q26511773
Farthings	II	Main Street			3 August 1961	TQ8269924652; 50°59′32″N 0°36′07″E		1217048	Upload Photo	Q26511790
Stapley Cottage	II	Main Street			13 May 1987	TQ8292724489; 50°59′27″N 0°36′19″E		1216986	Upload Photo	Q26511730
Oak End Oak House	II	Main Street			3 August 1961	TQ8275024635; 50°59′32″N 0°36′10″E		1216912	Upload Photo	Q26511663
Grove Cottage Grove Cottages The Grove	II	Main Street			3 August 1961	TQ8304524256; 50°59′19″N 0°36′24″E		1216902	Upload Photo	Q26511652
The Byre House	II	Main Street			3 August 1961	TQ8289124500; 50°59′27″N 0°36′17″E		1275592	Upload Photo	Q26565164
Rosebud Cottage	II	Main Street			13 May 1987	TQ8258824952; 50°59′42″N 0°36′02″E		1217114	Upload Photo	Q26511853
Oak Cottages	II	1 and 2, Main Street			13 May 1987	TQ8277724638; 50°59′32″N 0°36′11″E		1275597	Upload Photo	Q26565169
Seven Oaks Cottage	II	1 and 2, Main Street			13 May 1987	TQ8278624636; 50°59′32″N 0°36′12″E		1275684	Upload Photo	Q26565248
Beachfield	II	1 and 2, Main Street			13 May 1987	TQ8265224748; 50°59′35″N 0°36′05″E		1216989	Upload Photo	Q26511732
Thistledown	II	Mill Corner			14 October 1996	TQ8259123476; 50°58′54″N 0°35′59″E		1268408	Upload Photo	Q26558717
Orchard Cottage	II	Mill Corner			14 October 1996	TQ8258523454; 50°58′54″N 0°35′59″E		1268445	Upload Photo	Q26558753
Wishing Tree Cottage	II	Mill Corner			13 May 1987	TQ8236623474; 50°58′54″N 0°35′48″E		1275584	Upload Photo	Q26565156
Mill House	II	Mill Corner			13 May 1987	TQ8231823415; 50°58′53″N 0°35′45″E		1275586	Upload Photo	Q26565158
Holmwood	II	Mill Corner			13 May 1987	TQ8215023366; 50°58′51″N 0°35′37″E		1275541	Upload Photo	Q26565118
Mill Cottage	II	Mill Corner			13 May 1987	TQ8231323446; 50°58′54″N 0°35′45″E		1217105	Upload Photo	Q26511844
Yew Tree Cottage	II	Mill Corner			13 May 1987	TQ8245923491; 50°58′55″N 0°35′53″E		1217168	Upload Photo	Q26511901
Park View	II	Mill Corner			13 May 1987	TQ8275823601; 50°58′58″N 0°36′08″E		1217052	Upload Photo	Q26511793
Rose Cottage	II	Mill Corner			13 May 1987	TQ8274723596; 50°58′58″N 0°36′08″E		1217103	Upload Photo	Q26679380
Dial Cottage	II	Mill Corner			13 May 1987	TQ8238323501; 50°58′55″N 0°35′49″E		1217104	Upload Photo	Q26511843
Little Croft Willow Cottage	II	Mill Corner			13 May 1987	TQ8249323498; 50°58′55″N 0°35′54″E		1217106	Upload Photo	Q26511845
Hollywell	II	Mill Corner			13 May 1987	TQ8272223562; 50°58′57″N 0°36′06″E		1217158	Upload Photo	Q26511890
Chasmead Cleve Cottage Mill Terrace	II	Mill Corner			13 May 1987	TQ8228023436; 50°58′53″N 0°35′43″E		1275585	Upload Photo	Q26565157
Apple Yard Cottage	II	Mill Lane, Rye, TN31 6JU			14 October 1996	TQ8260923464; 50°58′54″N 0°36′00″E		1268443	Upload Photo	Q26682781
Oak Cottage	II	New Road			13 May 1987	TQ8160623426; 50°58′54″N 0°35′09″E		1275542	Upload Photo	Q26565119
Brook'S Farmhouse	II	New Road, Brook's Farm			13 May 1987	TQ8218123278; 50°58′48″N 0°35′38″E		1217107	Upload Photo	Q26511846
Former Six Bells Inn	II	Rye, TN31 6NP			13 May 1987	TQ8304324320; 50°59′21″N 0°36′24″E		1275679	Upload Photo	Q26565243
Brickwall	I	Rye Road			3 August 1961	TQ8305724048; 50°59′12″N 0°36′24″E		1217202	Brickwall More images	Q17534976
The Wilderness	II	Rye Road			3 August 1961	TQ8306624205; 50°59′17″N 0°36′25″E		1217108	Upload Photo	Q26511847
The Entrance Gateway And Gates Of Brickwall To The North East Of The House	II	Rye Road			3 August 1961	TQ8308124139; 50°59′15″N 0°36′26″E		1217208	Upload Photo	Q26511937
The Stables Of Brickwall To The South East Of The House	II	Rye Road			3 August 1961	TQ8310124036; 50°59′12″N 0°36′27″E		1275587	Upload Photo	Q26565159
The Garden Walls Of Brickwall On The West, South And South East Side Of The House	II	Rye Road			13 May 1987	TQ8309523891; 50°59′07″N 0°36′26″E		1217109	Upload Photo	Q26511848
Clench Green Cottage Lawn Cottage	II	Station Road			13 May 1987	TQ8259124887; 50°59′40″N 0°36′02″E		1275588	Upload Photo	Q26565160
Dora Cottage	II	Station Road			13 May 1987	TQ8255824958; 50°59′42″N 0°36′00″E		1275589	Upload Photo	Q26565161
Turnpike Cottage	II	Station Road			13 May 1987	TQ8256124975; 50°59′43″N 0°36′01″E		1275590	Upload Photo	Q26565162
Septembre Summer Cottage	II	Station Road			13 May 1987	TQ8256124997; 50°59′43″N 0°36′01″E		1217219	Upload Photo	Q26511948
Oasthouses And Granary At Gate Court To South East Of The House	II	Station Road			20 May 1976	TQ8367826486; 51°00′30″N 0°37′01″E		1217120	Upload Photo	Q26511859
Marlows	II	Station Road			13 May 1987	TQ8263825281; 50°59′53″N 0°36′05″E		1217116	Upload Photo	Q26511855
The Little House	II	Station Road			13 May 1987	TQ8325225940; 51°00′13″N 0°36′38″E		1217119	Upload Photo	Q26511858
Thornton Cottage Thornton House	II	Station Road			13 May 1987	TQ8254924910; 50°59′41″N 0°36′00″E		1217217	Upload Photo	Q26511946
Ivy Lodge	II	Station Road			13 May 1987	TQ8315025891; 51°00′12″N 0°36′32″E		1217117	Upload Photo	Q26511856
Smuggler'S Cottage	II	Station Road			1 October 1987	TQ8258925117; 50°59′47″N 0°36′02″E		1238396	Upload Photo	Q26531457
Tipsy Cottage	II	Station Road			13 May 1987	TQ8259225107; 50°59′47″N 0°36′02″E		1275522	Upload Photo	Q26565100
Gate Court	II	Station Road			3 August 1961	TQ8373426556; 51°00′33″N 0°37′04″E		1275591	Upload Photo	Q26565163
Newenden Bridge	II*	Station Road			3 August 1961	TQ8352127039; 51°00′48″N 0°36′54″E		1217121	Upload Photo	Q17555906
Moloney Country Property	II	The Village Green, Rye, TN31 6ND			13 May 1987	TQ8293724471; 50°59′26″N 0°36′19″E		1275680	Upload Photo	Q26565244

== See also ==
- Grade I listed buildings in East Sussex
- Grade II* listed buildings in East Sussex

== Sources ==
- Antram, Nicholas; Pevsner, Nikolaus (2012) [1965], Sussex: East, The Buildings of England, New Haven and London: Yale University Press, ISBN 978-0-300-18473-0
