= Listed buildings in Sedlescombe =

Civil Parish in East Sussex, England

Sedlescombe is a village and civil parish in the Rother District, East Sussex, England. It contains one grade I, two grade II* and 54 grade II listed buildings that are recorded in the National Heritage List for England.

This list is based on the information retrieved online from Historic England.

== Key ==
| Grade | Criteria |
|---|---|
| I | Buildings that are of exceptional interest |
| II* | Particularly important buildings of more than special interest |
| II | Buildings that are of special interest |

== Listing ==
| Name | Grade | Location | Type | Completed (Note: The date given is the date used by Historic England as significant for the initial building or that of an important part in the structure's description.) | Date designated | Grid ref. (Note: The grid reference is based on the British national grid reference system, sometimes known as OSGB36, used by the Ordnance Survey.) Geo-coordinates | Notes | Entry number (Note: The "List Entry Number" is a unique number assigned to each listed building and scheduled monument by Historic England.) | Image | Wikidata |
|---|---|---|---|---|---|---|---|---|---|---|
| Bourne's Farmhouse | II | Brede Lane, Bourne's Farm | | | 13 May 1987 | TQ7927018620; 50°56′21″N 0°33′01″E | | 1221524 | Upload Photo | Q26515907 |
| 1 and 2 Brede Farm Cottages, Brede Lane | II | 1 and 2 Brede Farm Cottages, Brede Lane | | | 13 May 1987 | TQ7895118443; 50°56′16″N 0°32′44″E | | 1221822 | Upload Photo | Q26516192 |
| Barn at Luff's Farm to the East of the Farmhouse | II | Crazy Lane, Luff's Farm | | | 13 May 1987 | TQ7830317413; 50°55′43″N 0°32′09″E | | 1275086 | Upload Photo | Q26564699 |
| Chittlebirch | II | Cripp's Corner | | | 13 May 1987 | TQ7764120932; 50°57′38″N 0°31′41″E | | 1221526 | Upload Photo | Q26515909 |
| Castlemans | II | Hawkhurst Road | | | 13 May 1987 | TQ7774118734; 50°56′26″N 0°31′43″E | | 1221527 | Upload Photo | Q26515910 |
| Beech House | II | Hawkhurst Road | | | 3 August 1961 | TQ7769518701; 50°56′25″N 0°31′40″E | | 1221529 | Upload Photo | Q26515912 |
| The Parish Church of St John the Baptist | II* | Hawkhurst Road | | | 3 August 1961 | TQ7771218803; 50°56′29″N 0°31′41″E | | 1275087 | Upload Photo | Q17556117 |
| The Old Rectory | II | Hawkhurst Road | | | 3 August 1961 | TQ7765918763; 50°56′27″N 0°31′39″E | | 1275088 | Upload Photo | Q26564700 |
| Beech Farmhouse | II | Hawkhurst Road, Beech Farm | | | 13 May 1987 | TQ7763919809; 50°57′01″N 0°31′39″E | | 1275089 | Upload Photo | Q26564701 |
| Hurst House | II | Hurst Lane | | | 15 September 1998 | TQ7879919059; 50°56′36″N 0°32′37″E | | 1376515 | Upload Photo | Q26657062 |
| Beanford Farmhouse | II | Kent Street, Beanford Farm | | | 13 May 1987 | TQ7771416837; 50°55′25″N 0°31′38″E | | 1221530 | Upload Photo | Q26515913 |
| New England House | II | New England Lane | | | 13 May 1987 | TQ7858616524; 50°55′14″N 0°32′22″E | | 1275090 | Upload Photo | Q26564702 |
| Strawberry Hill Farmhouse | II | Poppinghole Lane, Strawberry Hill Farm | | | 3 August 1961 | TQ7658821532; 50°57′58″N 0°30′49″E | | 1221531 | Upload Photo | Q26515914 |
| Lea Bank | II | Poppinghole Lane | | | 13 May 1987 | TQ7579621527; 50°57′59″N 0°30′08″E | | 1221532 | Upload Photo | Q26515915 |
| Barne's Farmhouse | II | Poppinghole Lane, Barne's Farm | | | 13 May 1987 | TQ7590321516; 50°57′58″N 0°30′13″E | | 1221852 | Upload Photo | Q26516222 |
| Jacob's Farmhouse | II | Powdermill Lane, Jacob's Farm | | | 13 May 1987 | TQ7948118991; 50°56′33″N 0°33′12″E | | 1222005 | Upload Photo | Q26516363 |
| Jacob's Cottage | II | Powdermill Lane, Jacob's Cottage | | | 13 May 1987 | TQ7980319192; 50°56′39″N 0°33′29″E | | 1275091 | Upload Photo | Q26564703 |
| Little Castlemans | II | Stream Lane | | | 3 August 1961 | TQ7755218936; 50°56′33″N 0°31′33″E | | 1221533 | Upload Photo | Q26515916 |
| Durhamford Manor | II* | Stream Lane, Durhamford Manor | | | 3 August 1961 | TQ7728418852; 50°56′31″N 0°31′19″E | | 1222027 | Upload Photo | Q17555930 |
| Spilsted Farmhouse | II | Stream Lane | | | 3 August 1961 | TQ7715118835; 50°56′30″N 0°31′13″E | | 1222049 | Upload Photo | Q26516405 |
| Barn at Durhamford Manor to the North West of the House | II | Stream Lane, Durhamford Manor | | | 13 May 1987 | TQ7725618864; 50°56′31″N 0°31′18″E | | 1275092 | Upload Photo | Q26564704 |
| Spilsted Cottages | II | 1 and 2, Stream Lane | | | 13 May 1987 | TQ7718018850; 50°56′31″N 0°31′14″E | | 1221534 | Upload Photo | Q26515917 |
| Swailes Green Farmhouse | II | Swaile's Green | | | 13 May 1987 | TQ7709421060; 50°57′42″N 0°31′14″E | | 1222085 | Upload Photo | Q26516439 |
| Little Swailes Green Farmhouse | II | Swaile's Green | | | 13 May 1987 | TQ7725720999; 50°57′40″N 0°31′22″E | | 1274778 | Upload Photo | Q26564417 |
| Footland Farmhouse | II | Swaile's Green, Footland Farm | | | 3 August 1961 | TQ7714020408; 50°57′21″N 0°31′15″E | | 1274807 | Upload Photo | Q26564440 |
| Swailes Green Cottages | II | 1-4, Swaile's Green | | | 13 May 1987 | TQ7732621055; 50°57′42″N 0°31′25″E | | 1274846 | Upload Photo | Q26564475 |
| Brickwall Hotel | II | The Street | | | 13 May 1987 | TQ7813918037; 50°56′03″N 0°32′02″E | | 1222071 | Brickwall Hotel More images | Q26516424 |
| The Queen's Head Inn | II | The Street | | | 3 August 1961 | TQ7818617991; 50°56′02″N 0°32′04″E | | 1222072 | The Queen's Head Inn More images | Q26516425 |
| Pump Cottage | II | The Street | | | 13 May 1987 | TQ7820417939; 50°56′00″N 0°32′05″E | | 1222074 | Pump Cottage More images | Q26516428 |
| Asselton House | II | The Street | | | 13 May 1987 | TQ7822517917; 50°55′59″N 0°32′06″E | | 1222076 | Asselton House More images | Q26516430 |
| Farthing Cottage | II | The Street | | | 13 May 1987 | TQ7823617852; 50°55′57″N 0°32′06″E | | 1222078 | Farthing Cottage More images | Q26516432 |
| Postboys | II | The Street | | | 13 May 1987 | TQ7810617979; 50°56′02″N 0°32′00″E | | 1222081 | Postboys More images | Q26516435 |
| Sherrald | II | The Street | | | 13 May 1987 | TQ7814917920; 50°56′00″N 0°32′02″E | | 1222082 | Sherrald More images | Q26516436 |
| Fir Tree Cottage | II | The Street | | | 13 May 1987 | TQ7816617852; 50°55′57″N 0°32′03″E | | 1222083 | Fir Tree Cottage More images | Q26516437 |
| Homestall | II | The Street | | | 13 May 1987 | TQ7817517832; 50°55′57″N 0°32′03″E | | 1222084 | Homestall More images | Q26516438 |
| Harriet House | II | The Street | | | 13 May 1987 | TQ7820817928; 50°56′00″N 0°32′05″E | | 1222099 | Harriet House More images | Q26516453 |
| Homes House Restaurant | II | The Street | | | 3 August 1961 | TQ7821917900; 50°55′59″N 0°32′06″E | | 1222107 | Homes House Restaurant More images | Q26516461 |
| Forge House | II | The Street | | | 13 May 1987 | TQ7823317861; 50°55′58″N 0°32′06″E | | 1222117 | Forge House More images | Q26516469 |
| Chestnut Tree Cottage | II | The Street | | | 3 August 1961 | TQ7810217989; 50°56′02″N 0°32′00″E | | 1222147 | Chestnut Tree Cottage More images | Q26516497 |
| Durud | II | The Street | | | 13 May 1987 | TQ7813817936; 50°56′00″N 0°32′02″E | | 1222149 | Durud More images | Q26516499 |
| Barrack Cottage | II | The Street | | | 3 August 1961 | TQ7824417831; 50°55′57″N 0°32′07″E | | 1274826 | Barrack Cottage More images | Q26564456 |
| Robinson's Stores | II | The Street | | | 13 May 1987 | TQ7819317954; 50°56′01″N 0°32′04″E | | 1274838 | Robinson's Stores More images | Q26564467 |
| The Pump House | II | The Street | | | 13 May 1987 | TQ7818117934; 50°56′00″N 0°32′04″E | | 1274839 | The Pump House More images | Q26564468 |
| The Old School Cottage | II | The Street | | | 13 May 1987 | TQ7802818246; 50°56′10″N 0°31′56″E | | 1221535 | Upload Photo | Q26515918 |
| Cherry Tree Cottage | II | The Street | | | 13 May 1987 | TQ7803418199; 50°56′09″N 0°31′57″E | | 1221536 | Upload Photo | Q26515919 |
| Myrtle Cottage | II | The Street | | | 13 May 1987 | TQ7804218192; 50°56′08″N 0°31′57″E | | 1222068 | Upload Photo | Q26516421 |
| The Old Gun House | II | The Street | | | 13 May 1987 | TQ7805318167; 50°56′08″N 0°31′58″E | | 1222070 | Upload Photo | Q26516423 |
| Barn to the East of the House Known As the Manor | II | The Street | | | 13 May 1987 | TQ7805317996; 50°56′02″N 0°31′57″E | | 1222143 | Upload Photo | Q26516493 |
| Tanyard House and Stores | II | The Street | | | 13 May 1987 | TQ7825817787; 50°55′55″N 0°32′07″E | | 1222163 | Upload Photo | Q26516514 |
| The Old Thatch | II | The Street | | | 3 August 1961 | TQ7821017775; 50°55′55″N 0°32′05″E | | 1222180 | Upload Photo | Q26516529 |
| The Cottage | II | The Street | | | 13 May 1987 | TQ7814617887; 50°55′59″N 0°32′02″E | | 1274802 | Upload Photo | Q26564436 |
| The Tithe Barn Restaurant | II | The Street | | | 13 May 1987 | TQ7826517770; 50°55′55″N 0°32′08″E | | 1274842 | Upload Photo | Q26564471 |
| The Presbytery | II | The Street | | | 13 May 1987 | TQ7809818003; 50°56′02″N 0°32′00″E | | 1274843 | Upload Photo | Q26564472 |
| Sackville Cottage | II | The Street | | | 13 May 1987 | TQ7816017865; 50°55′58″N 0°32′03″E | | 1274845 | Upload Photo | Q26564474 |
| Forge Cottages | II | 1, 2 and 3, The Street | | | 3 August 1961 | TQ7823117883; 50°55′58″N 0°32′06″E | | 1222077 | Forge Cottages More images | Q26516431 |
| Riverbridge Cottages | II | 1-3, The Street | | | 13 May 1987 | TQ7829417712; 50°55′53″N 0°32′09″E | | 1222130 | Upload Photo | Q26516481 |
| Manor Cottages | I | 1-5, The Street | | | 3 August 1961 | TQ7806618038; 50°56′03″N 0°31′58″E | | 1274791 | Upload Photo | Q17535206 |

== See also ==
- Grade I listed buildings in East Sussex
- Grade II* listed buildings in East Sussex

== Sources ==
- Antram, Nicholas; Pevsner, Nikolaus (2012) [1965], Sussex: East, The Buildings of England, New Haven and London: Yale University Press, ISBN 978-0-300-18473-0
