= Listed buildings in Pett =

Historic structures in East Sussex, England

Pett is a village and civil parish in the Rother district, in East Sussex, England It contains 22 grade II listed buildings that are recorded in the National Heritage List for England.

This list is based on the information retrieved online from Historic England.

== Key ==
Grade	Criteria
I	Buildings that are of exceptional interest
II*	Particularly important buildings of more than special interest
II	Buildings that are of special interest

== Listing ==
Name	Grade	Location	Type	Completed (Note: The date given is the date used by Historic England as significant for the initial building or that of an important part in the structure's description.)	Date designated	Grid ref. (Note: The grid reference is based on the British national grid reference system, sometimes known as OSGB36, used by the Ordnance Survey.) Geo-coordinates	Notes	Entry number (Note: The "List Entry Number" is a unique number assigned to each listed building and scheduled monument by Historic England.)	Image	Wikidata
Chick Hill Cottage	II	Chick Hill			13 May 1987	TQ8868413668; 50°53′30″N 0°40′53″E		1275344	Upload Photo	Q26564944
Elms Farmhouse	II	Elms Lane			13 May 1987	TQ8783314101; 50°53′45″N 0°40′11″E		1217581	Upload Photo	Q26512292
Carter's Farmhouse	II	Elms Lane, Carter's Farm			3 August 1961	TQ8870414334; 50°53′52″N 0°40′56″E		1217582	Upload Photo	Q26512293
The Royal Oak Inn	II	Elms Lane			13 May 1987	TQ8773314015; 50°53′42″N 0°40′05″E		1217616	The Royal Oak Inn More images	Q26512321
Boulder Cottage	II	Pett Level			13 May 1987	TQ8889013316; 50°53′18″N 0°41′03″E		1217617	Boulder Cottage More images	Q26512322
Old Marsham Farmhouse	II	Pett Level, Old Marsham Farm			11 August 1972	TQ8846213317; 50°53′19″N 0°40′41″E		1275345	Upload Photo	Q26564945
The Beach House	II	Pett Level Road, Pett Level			26 November 2001	TQ8922613582; 50°53′27″N 0°41′21″E		1389520	Upload Photo	Q26668953
Gatehurst	II	Pett Road, Gatehurst			3 August 1961	TQ8779313890; 50°53′38″N 0°40′08″E		1275346	Upload Photo	Q26564946
French Court Farmhouse	II	Pett Road			13 May 1987	TQ8692514177; 50°53′49″N 0°39′24″E		1275348	Upload Photo	Q26564948
Nineacres	II	Pett Road			13 May 1987	TQ8714813945; 50°53′41″N 0°39′35″E		1275328	Upload Photo	Q26564929
The Old School House And School End	II	Pett Road			13 May 1987	TQ8708513972; 50°53′42″N 0°39′32″E		1275347	Upload Photo	Q26564947
Nedrabs	II	Pett Road			13 May 1987	TQ8656213712; 50°53′34″N 0°39′05″E		1275329	Upload Photo	Q26564930
Pett Methodist Church	II	Pett Road			13 May 1987	TQ8699113939; 50°53′41″N 0°39′27″E		1217586	Pett Methodist Church More images	Q26512298
Fairlight End	II	Pett Road			13 May 1987	TQ8678613867; 50°53′39″N 0°39′17″E		1217587	Upload Photo	Q26512299
Rectory Cottage And Rosemullion Cottage	II	Pett Road			13 May 1987	TQ8753914014; 50°53′43″N 0°39′55″E		1217589	Rectory Cottage And Rosemullion Cottage More images	Q26512301
Lunsford	II	Pett Road, Lunsford			13 May 1987	TQ8831613879; 50°53′37″N 0°40′35″E		1217619	Upload Photo	Q26512324
Vernon Cottage	II	Pett Road			25 May 1988	TQ8691413908; 50°53′40″N 0°39′23″E		1238401	Upload Photo	Q26531462
Barn At Lunsford To The South East Of The Farmhouse	II	Pett Road, Lunsford			13 May 1987	TQ8835313813; 50°53′35″N 0°40′37″E		1217583	Upload Photo	Q26512294
Wandon	II	Pett Road			13 May 1987	TQ8711613968; 50°53′42″N 0°39′34″E		1217585	Upload Photo	Q26512297
Ivy Cottage	II	Pett Road			13 May 1987	TQ8764814002; 50°53′42″N 0°40′01″E		1217624	Upload Photo	Q26512329
Corner Cottage, Meadowsweet And Knight's Cottage	II	Pett Road			24 October 1986	TQ8736413976; 50°53′42″N 0°39′46″E		1217584	Corner Cottage, Meadowsweet And Knight's Cottage More images	Q26512296
The Two Sawyers	II	Pett Road			13 May 1987	TQ8672213847; 50°53′38″N 0°39′13″E		1217588	The Two Sawyers More images	Q26512300

== See also ==
- Grade I listed buildings in East Sussex
- Grade II* listed buildings in East Sussex

== Sources ==
- Antram, Nicholas; Pevsner, Nikolaus (2012) [1965], Sussex: East, The Buildings of England, New Haven and London: Yale University Press, ISBN 978-0-300-18473-0
