= Listed buildings in Bodiam =

Civil Parish in East Sussex, England

Bodiam is a small village and a civil parish in the Rother district of East Sussex, England. It contains 15 listed buildings that are recorded in the National Heritage List for England. Of these one is grade I, one grade II* and 13 are grade II.

This list is based on the information retrieved online from Historic England

== Listing ==
Name	Grade	Location	Type	Completed (Note: The date given is the date used by Historic England as significant for the initial building or that of an important part in the structure's description.)	Date designated	Grid ref. (Note: Sometimes known as OSGB36, the grid reference is based on the British national grid reference system used by the Ordnance Survey.) Geo-coordinates	Entry number (Note: The "List Entry Number" is a unique number assigned to each listed building and scheduled monument by Historic England.)	Image	Wikidata
The Parish Church of St Giles	II*	Bodiam, Sandhurst Road			3 August 1961	TQ7823726191; 51°00′27″N 0°32′21″E	1352896	The Parish Church of St Giles More images	
Bodiam Castle	I	Bodiam, Ewhurst Road			3 August 1961	TQ7855425645; 51°00′09″N 0°32′36″E	1044134	Bodiam Castle More images	Q639208
Court Lodge Oasthouse	II	Bodiam, Sandhurst Road			13 May 1987	TQ7847126036; 51°00′22″N 0°32′33″E	1231997	Court Lodge Oasthouse More images	
Ellen Archers	II	Bodiam, Ewhurst Road			13 May 1987	TQ7832225546; 51°00′06″N 0°32′24″E	1277340	Upload Photo	
Kitchenham Cottage	II	Bodiam, 1, 2 and 3 Sandhurst Road			13 May 1987	TQ7827126470; 51°00′36″N 0°32′23″E	1352897	Upload Photo	
Kitchenham Farmhouse	II	Bodiam, Sandhurst Road			13 May 1987	TQ7832626607; 51°00′40″N 0°32′26″E	1044138	Upload Photo	
Oasthouses and Barn at Kitchenham Farm to North West of the Farmhouse	II	Bodiam, Sandhurst Road			13 May 1987	TQ7828926625; 51°00′41″N 0°32′25″E	1232002	Oasthouses and Barn at Kitchenham Farm to North West of the Farmhouse More images	
Lower Northlands Farmhouse	II	Bodiam, Sandhurst Road			13 May 1987	TQ7800426883; 51°00′50″N 0°32′10″E	1231999	Lower Northlands Farmhouse More images	
New House	II	Bodiam, Salehurst Road			13 May 1987	TQ7771225515; 51°00′06″N 0°31′53″E	1044135	Upload Photo	
Oasthouses and Barn Or Granary at New House to the West of the Farmhouse	II	Bodiam, Salehurst Road			20 May 1976	TQ7767625519; 51°00′06″N 0°31′51″E	1277294	Oasthouses and Barn Or Granary at New House to the West of the Farmhouse More images	
Old Mutton House	II	Bodiam, Salehurst Road			13 May 1987	TQ7778325932; 51°00′19″N 0°31′57″E	1231961	Upload Photo	
Old School House	II	Bodiam, Sandhurst Road			13 May 1987	TQ7814625786; 51°00′14″N 0°32′16″E	1044136	Old School House More images	
St Peter's Green Cottage	II	Bodiam, Sandhurst Road			13 May 1987	TQ7828626424; 51°00′34″N 0°32′24″E	1231998	Upload Photo	
The Mill House	II	Bodiam, Sandhurst Road			13 May 1987	TQ7835326673; 51°00′42″N 0°32′28″E	1044139	Upload Photo	
Woodbine	II	Bodiam, Sandhurst Road			13 May 1987	TQ7825526328; 51°00′31″N 0°32′22″E	1044137	Upload Photo	

== See also ==
- Grade I listed buildings in East Sussex
- Grade II* listed buildings in East Sussex

== Sources ==
- Antram, Nicholas; Pevsner, Nikolaus (2012) [1965], Sussex: East, The Buildings of England, New Haven and London: Yale University Press, ISBN 978-0-300-18473-0
