= Grade II* listed buildings in East Sussex =

East Sussex shown within England

The county of East Sussex is divided into six districts. The districts of East Sussex are Hastings, Rother, Wealden, Eastbourne, Lewes, and Brighton & Hove.

As there are 348 Grade II* listed buildings in the county they have been split into separate lists for each district.

- Grade II* listed buildings in Hastings
- Grade II* listed buildings in Rother
- Grade II* listed buildings in Wealden
- Grade II* listed buildings in Eastbourne
- Grade II* listed buildings in Lewes (district)
- Grade II* listed buildings in Brighton and Hove

== See also ==
- Grade I listed buildings in East Sussex
