= Denham Tracts =

Folklore compendium influencing J. R. R. Tolkien's hobbits

The Denham Tracts constitute a publication of a series of pamphlets and jottings on folklore, fifty-four in all, collected between 1846 and 1859 by Michael Aislabie Denham, a Yorkshire tradesman. Most of the original tracts were published with fifty copies (although some of them with twenty-five or even thirteen copies). The tracts were later re-edited by James Hardy for the Folklore Society and imprinted in two volumes in 1892 and 1895. It is possible that J. R. R. Tolkien took the word hobbit from the list of fairies in the Denham Tracts.

== List of the original tracts ==
I.

- «A collection of Proverbs and Popular Sayings related to the Seasons, the Weather, and Agricultural pursuits. Gathered chiefly from oral tradition.»
  Lond. printed for Percy Society by T.Richards, 100. St. Martin's Lane. 1846, pp. 73.

II.

- «A Myth of Mildridge; a story anent a Witless Wight's Adventures with the Mildridge Fairies in ye Bishoprick of Durham; now more than two centuries ago.»
  A Broadside of three columns, August 1849. Fifty copies.

III.

- «The Noble Nevills.» A notice of their Monuments in Staindrop Church, co. Durham.
  A Broadside of two pages. Oct. 1849. Fifty copies

IV. Slogans; and War and Gathering Cries.

- (1) «Slughorns of the North of England.»
  1st edit. Six pages, January 1850. Fifty copies.
- (2) «The Slogans; or, Gathering Cries of the North of England.»
  2nd edit. Twenty-four pages, Decem. 1850. Novo-Castro-Sup-Tynam. Printed by M. & M.W.Lambert, Grey-st. Fifty copies.
- (3) «Slogans of the North of England.»
  3rd edit., beautifully printed in colours, with many engravings. One hundred and ten pages. June, 1851. Newcastle upon Tyne, imprinted by George Bouchier Richardson, at the sign of the River God Tyne, 38, Clayton-st., West. Cr. 8vo., a few copies printed in 4to.

V.

- «A Collection of English Border Rhymes, Proverbs and Sayings in connexion with the Feudal Period.»
  Twelve pages, July, 1850. Fifty copies.

VI. Co: Pal: Durham. – Five Parts.

- Part I. «A collection of Bishoprick Rhymes, Proverbs and Sayings, in connexion with the Border and Feudal periods.»
  Twelve pages, August, 1850. Fifty copies. Inscribed «To the families of Hylton and Conyers.»
- Part II. «A collection of Rare and Popular Rhymes, Proverbs, Sayings of Reproach and Praise, &c., &c., relating to the City of Durham and its Inhabitants.»
  Pages 13 to 28, January 1851. Fifty copies. Inscribed «To ye Clargy, Lawers, and Olde Maids, of ye afore-named Cittie, &c.»
- Part III. «Rare and Popular Rhymes, Proverbs, Sayings, Characteristics, Reproaches, &c., &c., relating to the Inhabitants of certain Towns and Villages; and also to particular Families and Individuals in the County of Durham.»
  Pages 29 to 50, April, 1851. Fifty copies. Inscribed «To Joseph Ritson, Esq.»
- Part VI. «Rare and Popular Rhymes, Sayings, Characteristics, &c., &c., relating to certain Towns and Villages in the County of Durham.»
  Pages 51 to 78, May, 1851. Fifty copies. Inscribed «To Sir Cuthbert Sharp.» Civ. Dunelm. Imprinted by Will. Elliott Duncan & Sons, in Saddler-street.
- Part V. «Supplement to the Local Rhymes, Proverbs, Sayings, &c., &c., of the County of Durham.»
  Eight pages, September 1858. Fifty copies. Civ. Dunelm. Imprinted by Will. Duncan & Sons, in Saddler-street, 1859.

and 42 more pamphlets.

== List of spirits and fairies ==
This is a long list of spirits, fairies, bogies and other creatures, based on an older list in the Discoverie of Witchcraft, dated 1584, with many additions, a few repetitions and mention of many creatures that do not appear elsewhere. While the fact that the tracts contain creatures that are not referenced anywhere else could indicate that Denham had researched the subject more thoroughly than others of his time, a lack of other sources makes some think this unlikely despite Denham being regarded as a trustworthy source of information.

"What a happiness this must have been seventy or eighty years ago and upwards, to those chosen few who had the good luck to be born on the eve of this festival of all festivals; when the whole earth was so overrun with ghosts, boggles, Bloody Bones, spirits, demons, ignis fatui, brownies, bugbears, black dogs, spectres, shellycoats, scarecrows, witches, wizards, barguests, Robin-Goodfellows, hags, night-bats, scrags, breaknecks, fantasms, hobgoblins, hobhoulards, boggy-boes, dobbies, hob-thrusts, fetches, kelpies, warlocks, mock-beggars, mum-pokers, Jemmy-burties, urchins, satyrs, pans, fauns, sirens, tritons, centaurs, calcars, nymphs, imps, incubuses, spoorns, men-in-the-oak, hell-wains, fire-drakes, kit-a-can-sticks, Tom-tumblers, melch-dicks, larrs, kitty-witches, hobby-lanthorns, Dick-a-Tuesdays, Elf-fires, Gyl-burnt-tales, knockers, elves, rawheads, Meg-with-the-wads, old-shocks, ouphs, pad-foots, pixies, pictrees, giants, dwarfs, Tom-pokers, tutgots, snapdragons, sprets, spunks, conjurers, thurses, spurns, tantarrabobs, swaithes, tints, tod-lowries, Jack-in-the-Wads, mormos, changelings, redcaps, yeth-hounds, colt-pixies, Tom-thumbs, black-bugs, boggarts, scar-bugs, shag-foals, hodge-pochers, hob-thrushes, bugs, bull-beggars, bygorns, bolls, caddies, bomen, brags, wraiths, waffs, flay-boggarts, fiends, gallytrots, imps, gytrashes, patches, hob-and-lanthorns, gringes, boguests, bonelesses, Peg-powlers, pucks, fays, kidnappers, gallybeggars, hudskins, nickers, madcaps, trolls, robinets, friars' lanthorns, silkies, cauld-lads, death-hearses, goblins, hob-headlesses, bugaboos, kows, or cowes, nickies, nacks, waiths, miffies, buckies, ghouls, sylphs, guests, swarths, freiths, freits, gy-carlins, pigmies, chittifaces, nixies, Jinny-burnt-tails, dudmen, hell-hounds, dopple-gangers, boggleboes, bogies, redmen, portunes, grants, hobbits, hobgoblins, brown-men, cowies, dunnies, wirrikows, alholdes, mannikins, follets, korreds, lubberkins, cluricauns, kobolds, leprechauns, kors, mares, korreds, puckles, korigans, sylvans, succubuses, blackmen, shadows, banshees, lian-hanshees, clabbernappers, Gabriel-hounds, mawkins, doubles, corpse lights or candles, scrats, mahounds, trows, gnomes, sprites, fates, fiends, sibyls, nicknevins, whitewomen, fairies, thrummy-caps, cutties, and nisses, and apparitions of every shape, make, form, fashion, kind and description, that there was not a village in England that had not its own peculiar ghost. Nay, every lone tenement, castle, or mansion-house, which could boast of any antiquity had its bogle, its spectre, or its knocker. The churches, churchyards, and crossroads were all haunted. Every green lane had its boulder-stone on which an apparition kept watch at night. Every common had its circle of fairies belonging to it. And there was scarcely a shepherd to be met with who had not seen a spirit!"
