= Water monster =

Water monster may refer to:

- a sea monster
- a lake monster
- a water spirit
- a water bogey such as the grindylow, Jenny Greenteeth or Peg Powler
- an Axolotl, Mexican salamander

== See also ==
- List of aquatic humanoids
- River monster (disambiguation)
- Sea Monsters (disambiguation)
