= Hobbit (word) =

Word used by J.R.R. Tolkien

The word hobbit was used by J. R. R. Tolkien as the name of a race of small humanoids in his fantasy fiction, the first published being The Hobbit in 1937. The Oxford English Dictionary, which added an entry for the word in the 1970s, credits Tolkien with coining it. Since then, however, it has been noted that there is prior evidence of the word, in a 19th-century list of legendary creatures. In 1971, Tolkien stated that he remembered making up the word himself, admitting that there was nothing but his "nude parole" to support the claim that he was uninfluenced by such similar words as hobgoblin. His choice may have been affected on his own admission by the title of Sinclair Lewis's 1922 novel Babbitt. The Tolkien scholar Tom Shippey has pointed out several parallels, including comparisons in The Hobbit, with the word "rabbit".

== Use by Tolkien ==
=== Proposed etymology ===
By Tolkien's own account, the coining of the name hobbit was a spontaneous flash of intuition. When he was busy grading examination papers, the word popped into his mind, not in isolation but as part of an entire sentence, which was to become the incipit of The Hobbit, "In a hole in the ground there lived a hobbit."

Tolkien etymologized the name hobbit as the regular Modern English outcome of a hypothetical Old English *hol-bytla "hole builder". Within the linguistic fiction of The Lord of the Rings, the English etymology of Old English hol-bytlan → Modern English hobbit is the supposed translation of an "original" etymology of Rohirric kud-dukan → Westron kuduk.

=== Tolkien's statements ===
On 16 January 1938, shortly after the original release of The Hobbit a letter by a Habit in the English paper The Observer asked if Tolkien's Hobbits were modelled after "'little furry men' seen in Africa by natives and … at least one scientist", and also referenced an old fairy tale called The Hobbit from 1904, but Tolkien denied using these sources as inspiration, and no trace of the African Hobbits or the fairy tale collection was ever found. Tolkien replied to this letter with:

"I do not remember anything about the name and inception of the hero… I have no waking recollection of furry pigmies (in book or moonlight); nor of any Hobbit bogey in print by 1904. I suspect that the two hobbits are accidental homophones, and am content that they are not synonymous. And I protest that my hobbit did not live in Africa, and was not furry, except about the feet. Nor indeed was he a rabbit…."

Tolkien also acknowledged the possible unconscious connection to others' writings, particularly those of Sinclair Lewis, who wrote the novel Babbitt in 1922. In a 1966 correspondence with Professor Harry Bauer of the University of Washington, Tolkien wrote, "...I now wonder whether Sinclair Lewis's Babbitt had not some part in the invention of this name: hobbit. I read all of Sinclair Lewis's works."

In 1970 the Oxford Dictionary wrote to Professor Tolkien asking for the origins of the word, as they wished to include 'Hobbit' in the dictionary. Tolkien replied:

"For the moment this is held up, because I am having the matter of the etymology: 'Invented by J. R. R. Tolkien': investigated by experts. I knew that the claim was not clear, but I had not troubled to look into it, until faced by the inclusion of hobbit in the Supplement."

In the event Hobbit was fully ascribed to Tolkien, as no earlier source was found.

hobbit n. one of an imaginary race of half-sized persons in stories by Tolkien; hence ~RY (5) n. [invented by J.R.R. Tolkien, Engl. writer d. 1973, and said by him to mean 'hole-builder']

— The Concise Oxford Dictionary of Current English

In 1971 Tolkien once again referred to his "invention":

"The Ox. E. D. has in preparation of its Second Supplement got to Hobbit, which it proposes to include together with its progeny: hobbitry, -ish, etc. I have had, therefore, to justify my claim to have invented the word. My claim rests really on my 'nude parole' or unsupported assertion that I remember the occasion of its invention (by me); and that I had not then any knowledge of Hobberdy, Hobbaty, Hobberdy Dick etc. (for 'house-sprites')†; and that my 'hobbits' were in any case of wholly dissimilar sort, a diminutive branch of the human race.

"† I have now! Probably more than most other folk; and find myself in a v. tangled wood—the clue to which is, however, the belief in incubi and 'changelings'. Alas! one conclusion is that the statement that hobgoblins were 'a larger kind' is the reverse of the original truth. (The statement occurs in the preliminary note on Runes devised for the paperback edition, but now included by A & U in all edns.)"

== Possible inspirations ==
=== Hob-beings ===
The name hobbit for a diminutive legendary creature fits into a category of English words in hob- for such beings, based on the Middle English hobbe. These include hob, hobby, hobgoblin, Hobberdy Dick, Hobberdy, Hobbaty, hobbidy, Hobley, hobbledehoy, hobble, hobi, hobyn (small horse), hobby horse (perhaps from Hobin), Hobby (nickname for Robert), hobyah, Hob Lantern. This theory was reinforced when in 1977 the Oxford English Dictionary announced that it had found the source that it supposed Tolkien to have used: J. Hardy's 1895 The Denham Tracts, Volume 2, which stated that "The whole earth was overrun with ghosts, boggles ... hobbits, hobgoblins." The Tolkien scholar Tom Shippey writes that the list was, however, of ghostly creatures without bodies, nothing like Tolkien's solid flesh-and-blood hobbits.

=== Rabbit ===
Shippey notes a different connection, with rabbit, something that Tolkien "emphatically rejected", although the word appears in The Hobbit in other characters' opinions of Bilbo in several places. Bilbo compares himself to a rabbit when he is with the eagle that carries him; the eagle, too, tells Bilbo not to be "frightened like a rabbit". The giant bear-man Beorn teases Bilbo and jokes that "little bunny is getting nice and fat again", while the dwarf Thorin shakes Bilbo "like a rabbit".

Shippey writes that rabbit is not a native English species, but was deliberately introduced in the 13th century, and has become accepted as a local wild animal. Shippey compares this "situation of anachronism-cum-familiarity" with the lifestyle of the hobbit, giving the example of smoking "pipeweed". He argues that Tolkien did not want to write "tobacco", as it did not arrive until the 16th century, so Tolkien invented a calque made of English words. Donald O'Brien notes, too, that Aragorn's description of Frodo's priceless mithril mail-shirt, "here's a pretty hobbit-skin to wrap an elven-princeling in", is a "curious echo" of the English nursery rhyme "To find a pretty rabbit-skin to wrap the baby bunting in."

Tom Shippey's analysis of the parallels between "Hobbit" and "Rabbit"
Feature	"Hobbit"	"Rabbit"
Neologism	Tolkien, 1937	1398 (OED)
Etymology	Doubtful, see text	Unknown before Middle English
Familiar; Anachronism	Smokes "pipeweed", but tobacco did not arrive until 16th century	Introduced species but accepted as native
Appearance	Small, plump	(and also edible)
Name	Called "rabbit" by Bert the troll, eagle; called "little bunny" by Beorn	(both are common names)

== Evidence of earlier use ==
The only source known today that makes reference to hobbits in any sort of historical context is the Denham Tracts by Michael Denham. More specifically, it appears in James Hardy's edition (London: Folklore Society, 1895), vol. 2, the second part of a two-volume set compiled from Denham's publications between 1846 and 1859. The text contains a long list of sprites and bogies, based on an older list, the Discovery of Witchcraft, dated 1584, with many additions and a few repetitions. The term hobbit is listed in the context of "boggleboes, bogies, redmen, portunes, grants, hobbits, hobgoblins, brown-men, cowies, dunnies".

The Tolkien researcher Mark T. Hooker catalogues a number of words with a silhouette similar to hobbit, including:

Word	Meaning
hobit	a type of artillery piece; howitzer is a related word
hōbid	Old Saxon for "head"
hobaid	(anglicised hobbit) an Old Welsh measure of grain
hobet	variant of hobby, a small falcon species, Falco subbuteo
habit	In the Welsh fable Hanner Dyn, the title character's name means "half man"; the character is a personification of the force of habit
Hobith	The name of one of the "home gods" in The Gods of Pegāna by Lord Dunsany

Hooker fails to find any of them "an unambiguous source for the Hobbits of Middle-earth".

In the December 2003 Oxford English Dictionary newsletter, the following appears:

"4. hobbit — J. R. R. Tolkien modestly claimed not to have coined this word, although the Supplement to the OED credited him with the invention of it in the absence of further evidence. It seems, however, that Tolkien was right to be cautious. It has since turned up in one of those 19th-century folklore journals, in a list of long-forgotten words for fairy-folk or little people. It seems likely that Tolkien, with his interest in folklore, read this and subconsciously registered the name, reviving it many years later in his most famous character. [Editor's note: although revision of the OED's entry for hobbit will of course take this evidence for earlier use into account, it does not yet appear in the online version of the entry.]"

As of 2024 the entry had "not yet been fully revised" in the OED Online.

== Proprietary status ==
In 1968 United Artists acquired film and related merchandising rights to The Hobbit and The Lord of the Rings. Saul Zaentz bought the merchandising rights in 1976, vested in the Saul Zaentz Company (SZC; trade name "Middle-earth Enterprises", formerly "Tolkien Enterprises"). SZC registered trademarks in various product categories for names related to elements of the novels.

The role-playing game Dungeons & Dragons has humanoid races approximating Tolkien's. The halfling race was called "hobbit" until it was changed after a 1977 lawsuit by Tolkien Enterprises in the run-up to the release of the animated film The Lord of the Rings. For the same reason, Dungeons & Dragons "ents" were renamed treants; on the other hand elf, orc, and dwarf races were not renamed. Although the word halfling is used in The Lord of the Rings as an exonym of hobbit, it is not proprietary to Tolkien and an earlier published citation in the OED is from The Sword of Rhiannon. Later fantasy works also used halfling in a similar sense.

In 2008 SZC won a World Intellectual Property Organization case against a cybersquatter for control of the domain name hobbits.com and typosquat hobbitts.com.

In 2012 Warner Bros. released The Hobbit: An Unexpected Journey in association with SZC. To coincide with the release, a New Zealand scientist planned a public lecture on Homo floresiensis, an extinct human-like species discovered in 2003 and unofficially nicknamed "the hobbit" after its 2004 publication, because of its small stature. SZC refused permission to use the word "hobbit" in publicising the lecture. The same year, The Asylum tried to release a mockbuster film with the title Age of the Hobbits. SZC and Warner sued, alleging Asylum's title was confusingly similar and violated its trademarks on the word "hobbit". Asylum claimed that its film was about Homo floresiensis, "uniformly referred to as 'Hobbits' in the scientific community", and also cited the word hobbit's appearance in the Denham Tracts. The U.S. District Court said Asylum's evidence did not invalidate the trademark's distinctiveness and granted an injunction; Asylum's film was eventually released as Clash of the Empires.

Businesses to which SZC has sent cease-and-desist letters include the Hobbit Grille restaurant in Bonita Springs, Florida in 2007; The Hungry Hobbit café in Birmingham in 2011; a Scottish manufacturer of cylindrical timber lodges called "hobbit houses" in 2011; The Hobbit pub in Southampton in 2012; and an English wine importer called Giraffe and Hobbit in 2016. SZC offered a cheap copyright licence to the pub in response to online criticism of perceived excessive litigiousness. Hobbit Travel of Minnesota won a 2008 case against SZC on the ground of laches (unreasonable delay) as it had used the word "hobbit" in its name since 1976.

== See also ==
- "Guide to the Names in The Lord of the Rings"
- Hobbit (unit), a unit of weight or volume formerly used in Wales

== Sources ==
- Shippey, Tom (2005) [1982]. The Road to Middle-Earth: How J. R. R. Tolkien Created a New Mythology (Third ed.). HarperCollins. ISBN 978-0-261-10275-0.
