= Bogle =

Ghost or folkloric being

- Grouping: Folkloric creature
- Sub grouping: Household spirit
- Similar entities: Boggart
- Folklore: Northumbrian Folklore
- Other name(s): Boggle; Bogill
- Country: Scotland and England
- Region: Lowland Scotland/Northumbria/Cumbria
- Habitat: Within the home

A bogle, boggle, or bogill is a Northumbrian, Cumbrian and Scots term for a ghost or folkloric being, used for a variety of related folkloric creatures including Shellycoats, Barghests, Brags, the Hedley Kow and even giants such as those associated with Cobb's Causeway (also known as "ettins", "yetuns" or "yotuns" in Northumberland and "Etenes", "Yttins" or "Ytenes" in the South and South West). They are reputed to live for the simple purpose of perplexing mankind, rather than seriously harming or serving them.

== Etymology ==
The name is derived from the Middle-English Bugge (from which the term bogey is also derived) which is in turn a cognate of the German term word bögge (from which böggel-mann ("Goblin") is derived) and possibly the Norwegian dialect word bugge meaning "important man". The Welsh Bwg could also be connected, and was thought in the past to be the origin of the English term; however, it has been suggested that it is itself a borrowing from Middle English.

The Irish Gaelic word "bagairt" meaning "threat" could also be related.

Terms such as ettin and yotun are derived from Middle English eten, etend, from Old English eoten (“giant, monster, enemy”), from Proto-Germanic *etunaz (“giant, glutton”), from Proto-Indo-European *h₁ed- (“to eat”) and is cognate with Old Norse jötunn.

== Usage ==
One of the most famous usages of the term was by Gavin Douglas, who was in turn quoted by Robert Burns at the beginning of Tam O' Shanter:

Of Brownyis and of Bogillis full is this Buke.

There is a popular story of a bogle known as Tatty Bogle, who would hide himself in potato fields (hence his name) and either attack unwary humans or cause blight within the patch. This bogle was depicted as a scarecrow, "bogle" being an old name for "scarecrow" in various parts of England and Scotland. Another popular Scottish reference to bogles comes in The Bogle by the Boor Tree, a Scots poem written by W. D. Cocker. In this ghostly ode, the Bogle is heard in the wind and in the trees to "fricht wee weans" (frighten small children).

In the Scottish Lowlands circa 1950, a bogle was a ghost as was a bogeyman, and a Tattie-Bogle was a scarecrow, used to keep creatures out of the potato fields. All three words were in common use among the children.

It is unclear what the connection is between "Bogle" and various other similarly named creatures in various folklores. The "Bocan" of the Highlands may be a cognate of the Norse Puki however, and thus also the English "Puck".

The Larne Weekly Reporter of 31 March 1866, in County Antrim, Northern Ireland, carried a front-page article entitled Bogles in Ballygowan, detailing strange goings on in a rural area where a particular house became the target for missiles being thrown through windows and on one occasion through the roof. Local people were terrified. The occurrences appeared to have ceased after several months and were being blamed on the fact that the house in question had been refurbished using materials from an older house that was apparently the preserve of the "little people". This is one of the few references in Northern Ireland to "bogles" although the phrase "bogey man" is widely used.

== See also ==
- Bogeyman
- Boggart
- Wirry-cow
