= Bogeyman =

Mythological antagonist

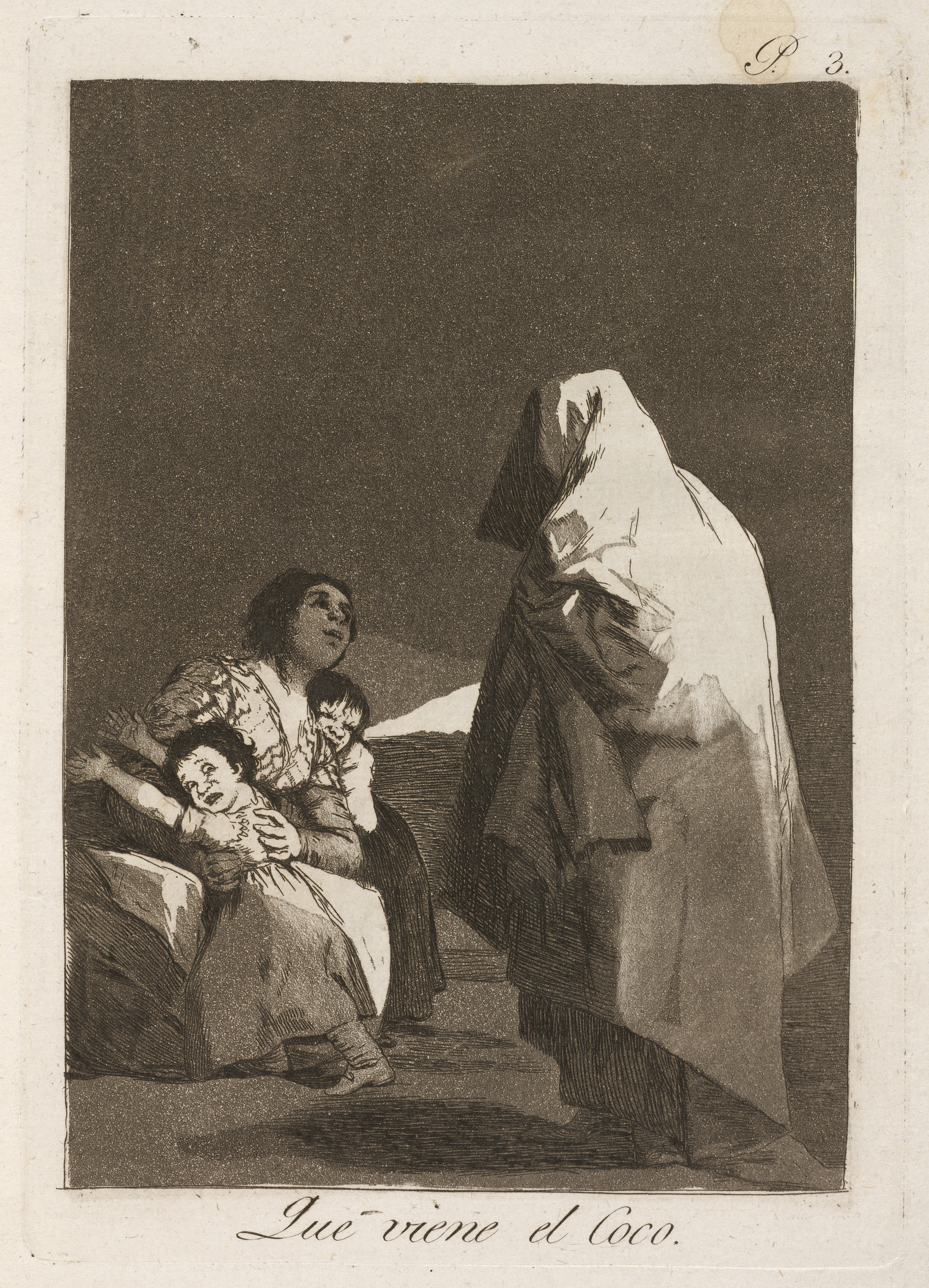
Goya's Que viene el Coco (Here Comes the Boogeyman/The Boogeyman Is Coming), c. 1797

The bogeyman (/ˈboʊɡimæn/; also spelled bogyman, bogy, or bogey, and known as boogeyman in the United States and Canada) is a mythical creature typically used to frighten children into good behaviour. Bogeymen take a variety of different forms both male and female, around the world, shaped by local customs and culture, but they are most commonly depicted as monsters who punish children for misbehaving. Bogeymen are often invoked by authority figures for the purposes of discouraging a child from a specific act or general misbehaviour. The term is sometimes used as a non-specific personification of, or metonym for, terror – and sometimes the Devil.

== Etymology ==
The word bogeyman, used to describe a monster in English, may have derived from Middle English bugge or bogge, which means 'frightening specter', 'terror', or 'scarecrow'. It relates to boggart and bugbear, a bear-like demon (bug) who eats small children. It was also used to mean a general object of dread. The word bugaboo, with a similar pair of meanings, may have arisen as an alteration of bugbear. Bogeyman itself is known from the 15th century, though bogeyman stories are likely to be much older.

While the derivation of bogge is obscure, the word has apparent cognates in many other European languages, including bogle (Scots), púca (Irish), bucca (Cornish), Babay (Slavic languages), bampoúlas (Greek) and mumus (Hungarian).

=== Physical description ===
It is often described as a dark, formless creature with shapeshifting abilities. The bogeyman is known to satiate its appetite by snatching and consuming children. Descriptions of the bogeyman vary across cultures, yet there are often commonalities between them including claws/talons, or sharp teeth. The nature of the creature also varies from culture to culture, although most examples are said to be a kind of spirit, with demons, witches, and other legendary creatures being less common variants. Some are described as having animal features such as horns, hooves, or a bug-like appearance.

=== Other putative origins ===
Because of the myth's global prevalence, it is difficult to find the original source of the legends. The Bogeyman was first referenced for the hobgoblins described in the 16th century England. Many believed they were made to torment humans, and while some only played simple pranks, others were more foul in nature.

== Cultural variants ==
Bogeymen, or bogeyman-like beings, are common to the folklore of many cultures, with numerous variations and equivalents.

=== Sack Man ===
The Sack Man is a variant of the Bogeyman folklore which, as its name suggests, stuffs children into a sack. It predominantly exists in the culture of Latin American countries, such as Argentina, Uruguay, Chile, Paraguay and Brazil; as well as in Iberian culture (Spain and Portugal), where the variant originated and whence it was brought over to the Americas through colonisation.

It is sometimes referred to as el hombre del costal, el hombre de la bolsa, el hombre del saco, or in Portuguese, o homem do saco; all such names meaning either "the sack man" or "the bag man". It may also be known as el viejo del saco (in Spanish) or o velho do saco (in Portuguese), which mean "the old man with the sack". Another Spanish-language variation is el roba-chicos, "the child-stealer".

Similar legends are present in Eastern Europe (e.g. Bulgarian Torbalan, "sack man"), as well as in Haiti and some countries in Asia.

=== El Coco ===
El Coco (also El Cuco and Cucuy, sometimes called El Bolo) is another version of the Bogeyman, common to many Spanish-speaking countries. The Cuca Fera (or Cucafera) monster is the equivalent in certain parts of Catalonia.

In Spain, parents will sing lullabies and tell rhymes to children, warning them if they do not sleep, El Coco will come to get them. The rhyme originated in the 17th century and, while it has evolved over the years, it has retained its original meaning. Coconuts (Spanish: coco) received their name because of the hairy, brown "face" created by the coconut shell's three indentations, which reminded the Portuguese sailors of "Coco".

Latin America also has El Coco, although its folklore is different, commonly mixed with native beliefs and, because of cultural contacts, sometimes more closely related to the US version of the Boogeyman. However, the term El Coco is also used in Spanish-speaking Latin American countries, such as Bolivia, Colombia, Guatemala, Peru, Mexico, El Salvador, Honduras, and Venezuela, although there it is more usually called El Cuco, as in Puerto Rico, the Dominican Republic, Chile, Uruguay, Panama and Argentina.

Among Mexican-Americans, El Cucuy is portrayed as an evil monster that hides under children's beds at night and kidnaps or eats those who do not obey their parents when told to go to sleep. However, the Spanish American bogeyman does not resemble the shapeless or hairy monster of Spain: social sciences professor Manuel Medrano says popular legend describes el cucuy as a small humanoid with glowing red eyes who hides in closets or under the bed. "Some lore has him as a kid who was the victim of violence... and now he's alive, but he's not," Medrano said, citing Xavier Garza's 2004 book Creepy Creatures and other Cucuys."

=== Cuca ===
In Brazilian folklore, a similar character called Cuca is depicted as a female humanoid alligator, or an old lady with a sack. There is a lullaby sung by many parents to their children that says that the Cuca will come to get them and make a soup, or soap out of them if they do not sleep, just as in Spain. The Cuca is also a character of Monteiro Lobato's Sítio do Picapau Amarelo ("Yellow Woodpecker's Farm"), a series of short novels for children, which contain a large number of characters from Brazilian folklore.

=== Babau ===
In central and eastern Mediterranean countries, children who misbehave are threatened with a creature known as "babau" (or "baubau", "baobao", "bavbav", or بعبع "Bu'Bu'" or similar). In Italy, the Babau is also called l'uomo nero or "black man". In Italy, he is portrayed as a tall man wearing a heavy black coat, with a black hood or hat which hides his face. Sometimes, parents will knock loudly under the table, pretending that someone is knocking at the door, and say something like: "Here comes l'uomo nero! He must know that there's a child here who doesn't want to eat his dinner!" It is also featured in a widespread nursery rhyme in Italy: "Ninna nanna, ninna oh, questo bimbo a chi lo do? Lo darò all' uomo nero, che lo tiene un anno intero." (English: "Lullaby Lulla Oh, who do I give this child to? I will give him to the Boogeyman, who's going to keep him for a whole year") L'uomo nero is not supposed to eat or harm children, but instead takes them away to a mysterious and frightening place.

=== Butzemann ===
German folklore has dozens of different figures that correspond to the Bogeyman. These have various appearances (such as of a gnome, man, animal, monster, ghost or devil). They are sometimes said to appear at or near very specific places (such as forests, bodies of water, cliffs, cornfields, or vineyards). These figures are called by many different names, which are often only regionally known. One of these, possibly etymologically related to the Bogeyman, is the Butzemann, which can be of gnome-like and other demonic or ghostly appearance. Other examples include the Buhmann (who is mostly proverbial) and der schwarze Mann ("The Black Man"), an inhuman creature which hides in the dark corners under the bed or in the closet and carries children away. The figure is part of the children's game Wer hat Angst vorm schwarzen Mann? ("Who's afraid of the bogeyman?").

=== Other examples ===
- Afghanistan – The Madar-i-Al is a nocturnal hag who slaughters infants in their cribs and is invoked to frighten children into obedience. Burning wild rue seeds and fumigating the area around the baby is believed to offer protection against her.
- Albania – The Buba is a serpentine monster. Mothers would tell their children to be quiet or the Buba would get them. The Gogol is a terrible giant who frightens children into being good. The Lubia is a female demon with an insatiable appetite for the flesh of children, especially girls. She has many heads, from seven to a hundred, and like the Greek hydra if one head is severed then others will grow in its place.
- Algeria - The H'awouahoua is a chimeric monster made from various animal parts and eyes of flaming spit. Algerian parents warn their children to behave or the H'awouahoua will come for them and eat them and use their skin to mend his coat that's made of human skin.
- Azerbaijan – The Div is a hairy giant who eats children. It was outsmarted and defeated by a clever young boy named Jirtdan, a popular hero in Azerbaijani fairy tales.
- Belize – Tata Duende is a mythical goblin described as being of small stature, with a beard, wrinkles, backwards feet, a large brimmed hat, and lacking thumbs. He is the protector of the forests and animals and was used to scare children from going out to play at night or going into the jungle, but he can also help those who are lost, who want to learn music or who want to find fortune.
- Bosnia and Herzegovina, Croatia, Serbia and North Macedonia – Babaroga (a South Slavic variant of Baba Yaga; baba meaning hag and rog meaning horn, thus literally meaning horned hag) is commonly attributed the characteristics of the bogeyman. The details vary regionally and by household due to oral tradition, but it always manifests as a menacing hag who hunts irreverent children. It is described as fond of trapping and eating caught children.
- Brazil and Portugal – A monster more akin to the Bogeyman is called Bicho Papão ("Eating Beast") or Sarronco ("Deep-Voiced Man"). A notable difference between it and the homem do saco is that the latter is a daytime menace and "Bicho Papão" is a nighttime menace. Another important difference is that "Homem do Saco" ("Sack Man") usually kidnaps children who go to places without parents authorisation, while "Bicho Papão" scares naughty children and hides under their beds, closets or roofs.
- In Inuit religion, there is a shapeshifter called the Ijiraq which is said to kidnap children, hide them away, and abandon them. If the children can convince the Ijiraq to let them go, they can use inukshuk to find their way home. Within Inuit mythology, there is also the Qallupilluit, human-like creatures with long fingernails, green skin, and long hair that live in the sea. They carry babies and children away in their parkas if the children disobey their parents and wander off alone close to the water. The Qalupalik adopt the children and bring them to live with them underwater.
- Canada – Within the culture of French Canadians the Bogeyman is called Bonhomme Sept Heures (En: The Seven O'Clock Man). Children are cautioned to go to bed by 7 pm, or else be taken by The Seven O'Clock Man.
- China, Hong Kong and Macau – Among Cantonese people, 鴉烏婆 (Jyutping: aa1 wu1 po4), roughly meaning "ugly old woman", refers to a mythical black-clad old hag who kidnaps children at night. This was used in the past as a cautionary scary tale to keep naughty children in line. However, the term does not refer to a "crow" even though the two Chinese characters used are those for "crow" in reverse. These are, in fact, phonetically similar modern choice of characters that replaced the unfamiliar original archaic characters.
- Cyprus – In Cypriot Greek, the Bogeyman is called Kkullas (Κκουλλάς); a man (vaguely described as hooded and/or deformed) who will put misbehaving children in a bag and take them away from their homes.
- Czech Republic – The equivalent of the Bogeyman in the Czech Republic is bubák (≈ imp) or strašidlo (≈ ghost), but these are not typically connected with abducting children nor with discriminating between well and bad behaved ones. This is more often attributed to polednice and klekánice (Lady Midday), or to the čert (Krampus, or lit. devil) who, along with St. Nicholas is traditionally believed to visit families on December 5.
- Egypt – The "Abu Rigl Maslukha" (ابو رجل مسلوخة), which translates to the "Man With Burnt/Skinned Leg". It is a story that is traditionally told by parents when children misbehave. It is a monster said to have been burnt as a child because he did not listen to his parents. He grabs naughty children to cook and eat them.
- England:
  - In East Yorkshire, children were warned that if they stole from orchards they might be eaten by a creature called Awd Goggie.
  - Yorkshire children were also warned if they were naughty the Great Black Bird would come and carry them away.
  - In Devon, local versions of Spring-Heeled Jack included a "bogeyman" who used to "dance about on the road and leap over hedges with the greatest of ease", with reported sightings in North Devon and locals describing "haunted" stretches of road in the South Devon towns of St Marychurch and Torquay, beginning in the 1840s.
  - The Gooseberry Wife was said to guard gooseberry bushes on the Isle of Wight and took the form of a large hairy caterpillar.
  - Churnmilk Peg in West Yorkshire was a female goblin who guarded nut thickets until they could be harvested and would always be seen smoking a pipe. Melsh Dick was her male counterpart in the West Riding and performed the same function.
  - Tom Dockin had iron teeth that he used to devour bad children.
  - Black Annis was a hag with a blue face and iron claws who lived in a cave in the Dane Hills of Leicestershire. She ventured forth at night in search of children to devour.
  - Grindylow, Jenny Greenteeth and Nelly Longarms were grotesque hags who lived in ponds and rivers and dragged children beneath the water if they got too close.
  - Peg Powler is a hag who is said to inhabit the River Tees.
  - Other nursery bogies include Mumpoker, Tankerabogus who drags children into his deep, dark pit and Tom-Poker who lives in dark closets and holes under stairs.
- Finland – The equivalent of the Bogeyman in Finland is mörkö, often depicted as a dark and hairy creature that may or may not be humanoid. A contemporary usage of the word is in Moomin-stories (originally written in Swedish) in which mörkö (the Groke) is a large, frightening, dark blue, ghost-like creature.
- France – The French equivalent of the Bogeyman is le croque-mitaine ("the mitten-biter" or "the hand-cruncher").

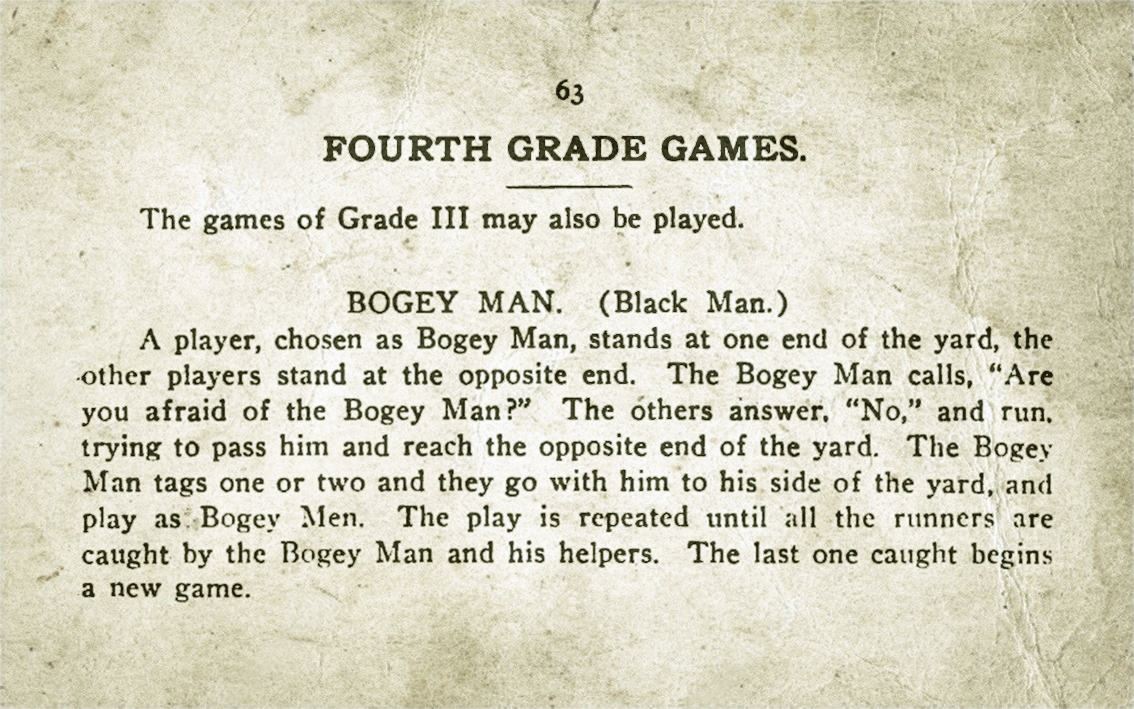
German game Der schwarze Mann, Philadelphia 1907.

- Germany – The Bogeyman is known as Der schwarze Mann ("the Black Man"). The word black/schwarz does not refer to the colour of his skin, but rather to his preference for hiding in dark places, such as in the closets or under the beds of children. There is also a folk game played by young children called "Wer hat Angst vorm schwarzen Mann?" (Who is afraid of the Black Man?), which is equivalent to the English game British Bulldog, and a folk song called "Es tanzt ein Bi-Ba-Butzemann in unserm Haus herum" (A Bi-Ba-Bogeyman Dances Around in Our House).
- Greece – In Greek culture, there exists a mythical creature called Baboulas (Greek: Μπαμπούλας). It is used by parents to scare children into behaving. It is said to be some kind of cannibal which eats children. A common phrase involving it is: "Greek: Ο Μπαμπούλας θα έρθει και θα σε φάει", meaning "The Bogeyman will come and eat you".
- Haiti – In Haiti, a Bogeyman-like entity exists known as Mètminwi / The Master of Midnight. It is depicted as a skinny, extremely tall man who walks around late at night and eats those on the streets. The story is told to children to deter them from going out late.
- Hungary – The Hungarian equivalent of the Bogeyman is the Mumus, which is a monster-like creature, as well as the Zsákos Ember, literally meaning "a man with a sack". A third creature is the Rézfaszú bagoly ("Copperpenis Owl"), a giant owl with a copper penis.
- Iceland – The Icelandic equivalent of the Bogeyman is Grýla, a female troll who is said to take and eat misbehaving children on Christmas Eve, despite supposedly having been dead for some time. She is also the mother of the Yule Lads, an Icelandic equivalent of Santa Claus.
- India – In India, the entity is known by many names across the subcontinent's numerous cultures. Urdu speaking peoples refer to Bogeyman-like creatures by names including Shaitan, Bhoot and Jin Baba. Hindi speakers call them Baba and Bhoot. In Bihar, parents use a demon named Bhakolwa as a Bogeyman. The terms Petona and Kaatu are also used. In Rajasthan, parents use the name Haboo. In Karnataka, the demon Goggayya (roughly meaning "terrible man") is a Bogeyman counterpart. In the state of Tamil Nadu, Rettai Kannan (the two-eyed one) or Poochaandi (பூச்சாண்டி) are equivalents. In Andhra Pradesh, the equivalent of the bogeyman is Boochodu. In central Kerala, the bogeyman is referred to as "Kokkachi", who is said to take away disobedient children. In South Kerala, the bogeyman is called "Oochandi". Among Konkani speakers on India's western coast, "Gongo" is the Bogeyman equivalent. Among Marathi speaking people (predominantly in Maharashtra), parents threaten the misbehaving children with a male ghost called "Bāgul Buā" (बागुल बुवा). In general, the "Buā" is supposed to kidnap children when they misbehave or do not sleep. In the eastern state of Odisha, the Bogeyman is a ghost figure called "Baaya" (ବାୟା). In West Bengal among Bengali speaking people, the equivalent is Juju (জুজু).
- Indonesia – In Indonesian mythology, particularly on Java, Wewe Gombel is a benevolent ghost which takes away children mistreated by their parents. She keeps the children in her nest atop a palm tree and takes care of the children until the parents decide to mend their ways. If they truly want their children back, Wewe Gombel will return them unharmed.
- Iran – In Iran, a popular children's folklore creature known as "لولو خورخوره" (Lulu Khor-Khore). Perception of it varies widely, but it's commonly represented as coming out at night and eating misbehaving children.
- Iraq – Iraqi folklore has the saalua, a half-witch half-demon ghoul who "is used by parents to scare naughty children". She is briefly mentioned in a tale of the 1001 Nights, and is known in some other Persian Gulf countries as well.
- Ireland – In Ireland, "An fear dubh" is similar to "L'uomo nero" in Italian folklore.
  - Petticoat Loose is the shade of a woman, damned for killing her children who haunted the South of Ireland.
- Italy – In Italy, "L'uomo nero" (meaning "the black man") is a demon who can appear as a black man or black ghost without legs, often used by adults for scaring their children when they do not want to sleep. In some parts of the country, it is known also as "babau".
  - Marabbecca is a malevolent water monster from the mythology of Sicily that was said to reside in wells and reservoirs and to come up and drag in children who played too close to the water.
- Latvia – referred to as the "Bubulis", an abstract masculine evil being who comes for disobedient children.
- Lithuania – referred to as the Baubas, an evil spirit with long lean arms, wrinkly fingers, and red eyes. He harasses people by pulling their hair or stifling them.
- Luxembourg – De béise Monni (the evil uncle), De Kropemann (the hookman), De Bö, and de schwaarze Mann (the black man) are Luxembourg's equivalents of the Bogeyman. Luxembourg's many variations of the bogeyman may be the result of the strong influence of neighbouring cultures. The Kropemann is said to live in the sewer, using his hook to catch children by the nose if they stand too close to a storm drain. Children may also be warned of the béise Monni / schwaarze Mann, will come to take them away if they don't behave.
- Malta – The Kaw Kaw / Gaw Gaw is said to be a grey slimy male humanoid creature who roams the streets at night. It smells guilt and enter the homes of guilty people, supposedly through cracks and fissures and by extending and contracting its snail-like body. Once inside, it is said to smile uncannily and terrify victims to death. There is also the Il-Belliegħa (the swallowing whirlpool), a female humanoid monster who can shapeshift into a giant serpentine eel-like monster with the face of a monstrous fish and a humanoid arm-like tail with seven fingers who she uses to pull down children who looks down on her wells, or sometimes her long frog-like tongue, but also subsists worms and eels if children are unavailable.

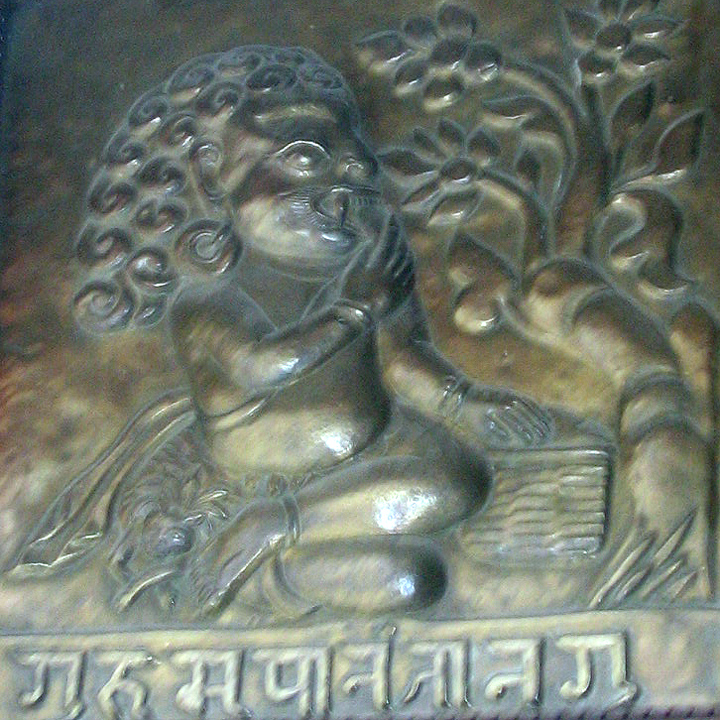
Plaque at Itum Bahal, Kathmandu showing Gurumapa

- Nepal – In Nepali culture, a popular bogeyman-like figure is hau-guji. Among the Newar people, the "Gurumapa" is a mythical ape-like creature who is said to enjoy devouring children, but is easily reasoned with. In central Kathmandu, at Itum Bahal, in front of the Bhadrakali Temple, is a plaque associated with Gurumapa.
- Netherlands – The Bokkenrijders or "buck riders" are ghostly thieves who ride flying goats.
- Niger – Jobars are giant monsters living in the desert that would eat naughty children.
- Pakistan – The Mamma is a large apelike creature who lives in the mountains and ventures forth to kidnap young girls. He will carry them back to his cave where he licks their palms and the soles of their feet which makes them permanently unable to flee.
- Panama – In Panama, children are warned that if they are naughty, La Tulivieja will come to get them. She is said to be a spirit cursed by God for drowning her child, and transformed into a hideous monster with a pockmarked face, long and bristly hair, clawed hands, a cat's body, and hoofed feet. She was also cursed to forever look for her drowned child.
- Poland – Baba Jaga is a mythological forest character who is said to kidnap badly behaving children and eat them. In some regions (mainly in western Poland) a more common creature is Bebok/Bobo, which in Polish folk beliefs was a small, ugly, annoying and mischievous owl-like creature who was used to scare children in order to discipline them. He is imagined as a small shaggy man wielding a stick or cane with an unnaturally large head, horse hooves and a huge sack into which he throws naughty children.
- Russia and Ukraine – Children are warned of Babay/Babayka, buka and Baba Yaga, who are said to come for them at night if they misbehave.
- Saudi Arabia – Abu Shalawlaw (أبو شلولو) is a Bogeyman-like creature said by parents to come to eat children who are disobedient, e.g., by not going to sleep on time or not completing their homework.
  - Hejaz, Saudi Arabia – أمنا الغولة والدوجيرة or "Dojairah and Umna al Ghola", which means "Our mother the Monster", is used to scare children when they misbehave or walk alone outside.
- Scotland - Misbehaving children were warned of a goblin or demon known as the bodach who would come down the chimney and take them.
  - The each-uisge is the Scottish version of the water horse, a monster who lives in seas and lochs and usually takes the form of a horse. A cautionary tale tells how the each-uisge persuaded seven little girls to get on its back before carrying them into the water to be devoured.
- Serbia – The Bauk is a bear-like mythic creature in Serbian folklore. Bauk is described as hiding in dark places, holes or abandoned houses, waiting to grab, carry away, and devour its victim; it has a clumsy gait and can be scared away by light and noise.
- South Africa – The Tokoloshe or Tikoloshe is a dwarfish creature of Xhosa and Zulu mythology said to be summoned by sangomas, a traditional healer of the region. It wanders around causing mischief and frightening children. It is also described as a small, muscular, hairy witch-familiar with an unusually large penis which visits women in their dreams and sexually assaults them.
- South Korea – The "Net Bag Grandfather" (Mangtae Hal-abeoji, 망태 할아버지) is an imaginary old man employed by adults to frighten children into obedience. It is said to kidnap spoiled, misbehaving children and take them away to the mountains, where they are never seen again.
- Spain
  - Catalonia – espantacriatures (lit. 'scare children' in Catalan/Valencian) is the general term for imaginary beings employed by adults to frighten children into obedience. Some examples include El Butoni, El Banyeta, la Quarantamaula, l'Home del sac (Sack Man), les encantades 'the enchanted (women)', la Cuca Fera, el Moro Mussa (or "Mussa the Moor"), la Bubota, els gambosins, and l'Home dels nassos.
- Sri Lanka - In Sri Lanka, the creature is called the Goni Billa, which originated from when India was kidnapping Sinhalese people for slavery in about 130–150 AD. They would put sacks on their heads (Goni in Sinhalese) and kidnap the Sri Lankans at night.
- Switzerland – In Switzerland, the Bogeyman is called Böllima or Böögg and has an important role in springtime traditions. The figure is a symbol of winter and death, and in the annual Sechseläuten ceremony of Zürich, a figure of the Böögg is burnt. In Southern Switzerland, people have the same traditions as in Italy.
- Syria – Principally in Syria, but also in bordering countries such as Lebanon and Turkey, parents warn at bedtime to go to sleep or King Richard the Lionheart will get them. The image of the English King Richard the First as a bogeyman in the Middle East has existed since the Third Crusade.
- Taiwan – The Grandmother/Aunt Tiger (Chinese: 虎姑婆; Pe̍h-ōe-jī: hó͘-ko͘-pô) is a figure used to scare disobedient children.
- Tanzania – Zimwi is a figure of Swahili folklore used to scare disobedient children.
- Trinidad and Tobago – Most Trinbagonians (mostly rural peoples) use folklore to scare disobedient children. The most common beings invoked are the Jumbee. Some "jumbies" are the Soucouyant, Lagahoo, La Diablesse, Papa Bois, etc. Bogeyman is also used in the same way, but it is more common in the cities. It is also called "The Babooman".
- Turkey – The Öcü ([œˈdʒy]) is an equivalent monster in Turkish culture. Much like its English language counterpart, the form, powers, or even general temperament of the creature is undefined to the degree that it is unclear whether the word refers to a single being or a category or species of mythic creatures.
- United Arab Emirates - Children were scared with Om Al-Khadar wa Alleef (أم الخضر واللّيف), which means "Mother of Vegetables and Fiber". This name is used in both the UAE and in some neighbouring countries like Bahrain. This mythical humanoid female creature is used by parents to make their children stay inside after sunset and go to sleep, along with getting them to eat their vegetables. The name was inspired by the palm tree because of the scary sounds it makes when the wind blows, and because it is tall and its leaves are so long that it resembles a woman.
- United States – The Bogeyman may be called "Boogerman" or "Boogermonster" in rural areas of the American South ("booger" being an American English equivalent of the British English "bogey"), and was most often used to keep young children from playing outside past dark, or wandering off in the forest. During the Green Corn Ceremony, young Cherokee boys wearing caricature masks would make fun of politicians, frighten children into being good, and shake their masks at young women and chase them around. Male participants in this "booger dance" were referred to as the "booger men". In some Midwestern states, the boogeyman scratches at the window. In the Pacific Northwest, he may manifest in "green fog". In other places he hides or appears from under the bed or in the closet and tickles children when they go to sleep at night, while in others he is a tall figure in a black hooded cloak who puts children in a sack. It is said that a wart can be transmitted to someone by the boogeyman.
  - The Jersey Devil, which originated in the Pine Barrens of New Jersey in the early 18th century, was originally described as having a horse's head, bat wings, cloven hooves, and a serpent's tail. Regarding the famous Jersey Devil sightings of 1909, Loren Coleman and Ivan T. Sanderson offered the explanation that they were part of an elaborate real estate hoax, used by developers as a boogeyman figure to frighten residents into selling their property at lower prices.
  - Bloody Bones, also known as Rawhead or Tommy Rawhead, is a boogeyman of the American South. Rawhead and Bloody Bones are sometimes regarded as two individual creatures or two separate parts of the same monster. One is a bare skull that bites its victims and its companion is a dancing headless skeleton. Bloody Bones tales originated in Britain.
  - The Nalusa Falaya ("Long Black Being") is a ghost being of Choctaw mythology described as a tall spindly humanoid that can slither like a snake or become a shadow. It may frighten children from staying out too late and can bewitch hunters.
  - Cipelahq (or Chebelakw) is a dangerous bird spirit of Wabanaki folklore, used in stories to scare children into obeying their parents. Chebelakw has an unearthly cry and resembles a large diving owl, with only its head and talons visible. Similar monsters called Stinkini and Big Owl were found in Seminole and Apache mythologies, respectively.
  - Madame Grands-Doigts ("Lady Long Fingers") in Louisiana has been used to scare children into behaving. She "is said to come at night and pull the toes of naughty children with her long, bony fingers."
- Vietnam – In Vietnam, the Ông Ba bị, Ông kẹ or Ngáo ộp is a creature often used by adults to scare children if they disobey. The Ông Ba bị is described as having nine jaws and twelve eyes ("Ba bị chín quai mười hai con mắt").

== In popular culture ==
"Hush, Hush, Hush, Here Comes the Bogeyman" is a children's novelty song recorded by British bandleader Henry Hall in 1932.

In the 1973 short story "The Boogeyman" by Stephen King, a titular monster kills the children of the protagonist, Lester Billings, driving him into a mental breakdown.

In several movies, the Bogeyman is portrayed as a villainous, dark humanoid figure, such as John Carpenter's Halloween (1978) Disney's The Nightmare Before Christmas (1993) (which featured Oogie Boogie), Scott Derrickson's Sinister, and DreamWorks' Rise of the Guardians (2012), among numerous others.

In a season one episode of the 1990s reboot of The Outer Limits titled "Under the Bed", it featured the plot of a small boy disappearing and his sister stating that the Boogeyman (performed by David Mylrea) took him. In this episode, the Boogeyman is a scaly shapeshifting creature that can only move around in nights of the New Moon where any type of light can turn it to stone. The Boogeyman is overpowered by a police detective (portrayed by Barbara Williams) and a psychologist (portrayed by Timothy Busfield) where they expose it to sunlight.

In the Disney Channel Original Movie Don't Look Under the Bed, boogeymen are corrupted imaginary friends that maliciously prank their creators with the intent of ruining their relationships with real friends and family. This transformation occurs when a child stops believing in their imaginary friend too soon, and is undone when the creator acknowledges that they were too quick to grow up and leave their childhood behind.

In John Wick (2014), the title character was known as Baba Yaga, because "John wasn't exactly the Boogeyman. He was the one you sent to kill the fucking Boogeyman."

== See also ==
- Albert Fish
- Baba Yaga
- Companions of Saint Nicholas
- Demon
- Erlkönig
- Jack the Ripper
- John Wayne Gacy
- Kappa (folklore)
- La Llorona
- Madam Koi Koi
- Michael Myers (Halloween)
- Nian
- Pennywise
- Shellycoat
- Slender Man
- Struwwelpeter
- Ted Bundy
- Tsutomu Miyazaki
- Yama (Buddhism)
- Yara-ma-yha-who
