= Black Penny =

Medicinal coin

The Black Penny, also known as the Hume-Byres Penny, was a coin with medicinal properties mentioned in the "Remedies for Hydrophobia", a short folkloric tale included in the Denham Tracts.

Farmers in Northumberland, Durham, and Yorkshire often borrowed the coin to cure madness in cattle. In order to take effect, the coin had to first be dipped into south-running water. Then, this water was collected and given to afflicted cattle to drink.

The penny belonged to the Turnbull family who resided in Hume-Byres of Northumberland. The Turnbulls were living in Hadden, near Sprouston when it came into their hands and it stayed in the family's possession for more than a hundred years, until it was lost around 1827. A man near Morpeth claimed to have returned the coin by post after borrowing it, but it had never arrived and was never to be found.

The nephew of the Turnbull family wrote in 1843 that the Black Penny was smaller and thicker than a common coin, had a raised rim, and seemed to be composed of copper and zinc. From this description, it was believed to be a Roman coin or medal.

== Remedies for Hydrophobia ==
"Remedies for Hydrophobia" mentions several stones and pennies that have similar healing properties as the Black Penny. Especially, "Lockerlee water" and "Lockerby Penny" must not be confused with the Lee Penny owned by the Lockhart family.

=== Lockerlee Water ===
A well located in "Lockerly (Lockerlee)" near the borders of Scotland had a stone dropped into it, and thus its waters gained healing powers which became known as "Lockerlee water". When a dog went mad in South Tynedale and bit a weaver's dog and some cattle, a man was sent to Lockerly to fetch some of this curing water. He returned and the afflicted animals who drank it soon recovered.

=== Lockerby Penny ===
The Lockerby Penny was a piece of silver in Dumfriesshire that was used to treat madness in cattle. When a mad dog bit a cow and donkey in a Northumbrian farm, the penny was borrowed with a deposit of 50 pounds. The cow was cured, the donkey died, and the dog was shot.

On March 23 of 1844, The Gateshead Observer reported that many rabid dogs had been spotted around Kirkwhelpington and Birtley in Northumberland. A messenger was sent to the borders of Cumberland for a stone that would cure the cattle afflicted by hydrophobia, caused by the resulting increase in dog bitings. When the stone was boiled in water which was then given to the cattle, however, it failed to cure the disease. The narrator notes that the messenger must have intended to borrow the Lockerby Penny but had brought home something else.

=== Black Penny ===
The Black Penny was owned by Mr. Turnbull, who had received it from his aunt as an heirloom when he was living in Hadden, near Sprouston. Its healing properties, much like that of "Lockerlee water" was first demonstrated by a crow dabbling the penny in water.

The penny became well known around Northumberland and Yorkshire and was lent to many farmers wanting to cure their cattle over the years. The last person recorded to have been in its possession was Mr. Thomas Millburn, resided in the Parish of Bothal in Ogle, North Seaton, who had borrowed the Black Penny on behalf of a cattle owner. This cattle owner was called John Sadler and had recently established a mansion in Tritlington, Hebron Chaperley, Morpeth to practice agriculture. Millburn claimed to have returned the penny by post, but it was lost and unheard of afterwards.

=== The Stone of Corbieheugh ===
Another healing stone was found in Corbieheugh in Ayton around 1730, described as "an article of glamourie". The stone, which was taken from a corbie (raven)'s nest, was triangular and transparent as if made of glass. In 1861 however, Mr. Henderson wrote that the corbie stone was white and opaque, the size of a pigeon's egg. It was used to cure pestilential disease in the Laird of Kimmerghame's cattle.

== Other stones of Northumberland and Scottish Borders ==
In Ireland, an elf arrow head was boiled with a reap halfpence and served to a suffering creature. Irish stones were once common in Northumberland, often used to ward off vermin from entering the house, which power came from St. Patrick's blessing on the Emerald Isle. One of these stones belonged to Thomas Hedley of Redesdale, had a pale brown colour, and was about three and a quarter inches thick.

Curing stones were stored in Stewart Hall in the Parish of Rothesay, Isle of Bute, which formerly seated the Stewarts of Kilwhineloch.

== See also ==
- Denham Tracts
