= Bloody Bones =

Figure in British and North American folklore

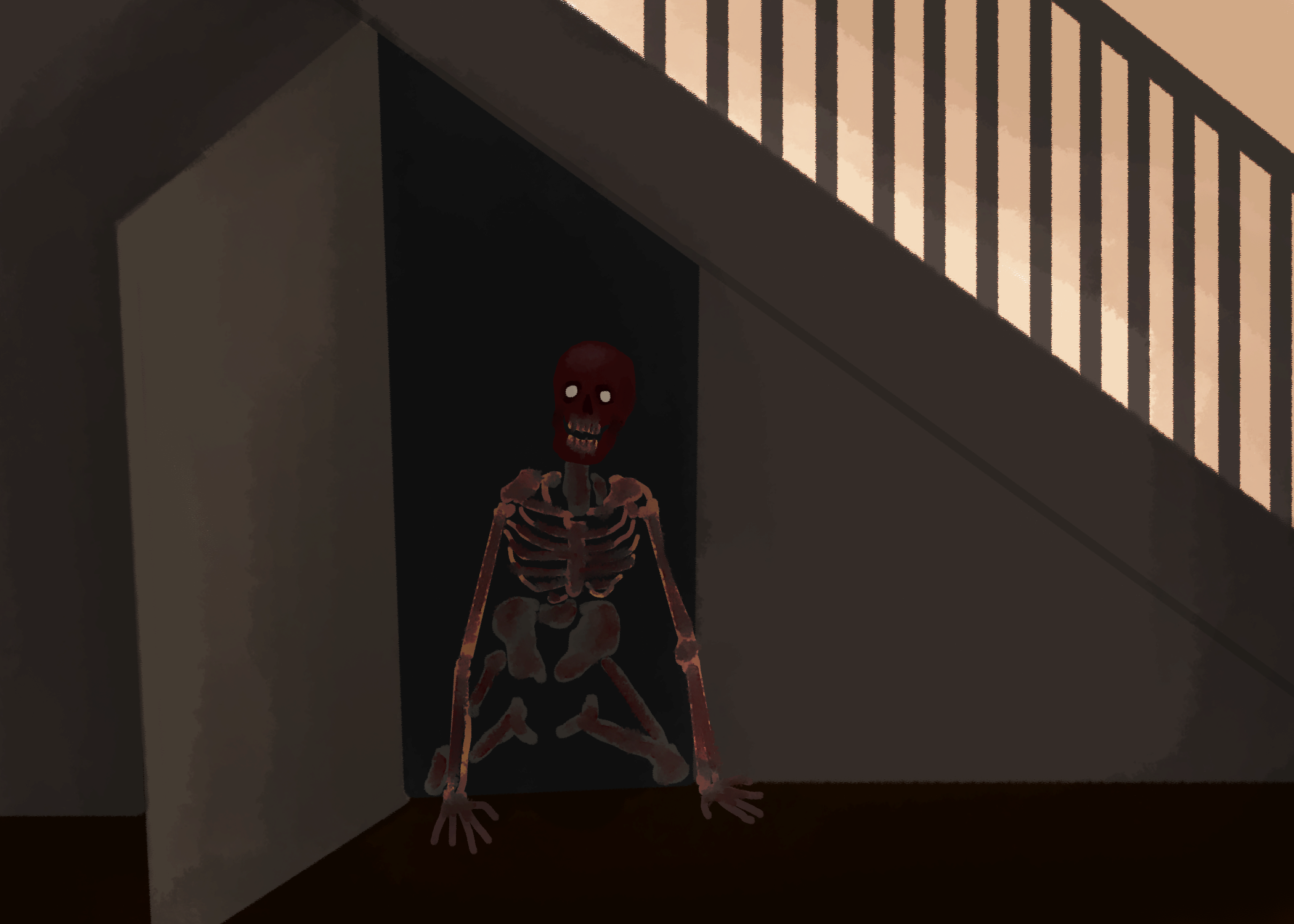
- An artistic depiction of Bloody Bones under stairs

Creature information
- Other names: Rawhead; Tommy Rawhead; Rawhead-and-Bloody-Bones; Old Bloody Bones
- Similar entities: Bogeyman

Origin
- Region: Lancashire; Yorkshire; Cornwall; Southern United States

Bloody Bones is a bogeyman figure in English and North American folklore whose first written appearance is approximately 1548. As with all bogeymen the figure has been used to frighten children into proper deportment. The character is sometimes called Rawhead, Tommy Rawhead, or Rawhead-and-Bloody-Bones (with or without the hyphens).

== Origins ==
The Oxford English Dictionary cites approximately 1548 as the earliest written appearance of "Bloodybone". The term "Raw-Head and Bloody-Bones, and such other Names" was used "to awe children, and keep them in subjection", as recorded by John Locke in 1693. Samuel Johnson in his Dictionary of the English Language (first published in 1755) defined "Rawhead" as "the name of a spectre, mentioned to fright children". The stories originated in Great Britain where they were particularly common in Lancashire and Yorkshire, and spread to North America where the stories were common in the Southern United States.

== Folklore ==
Bloody Bones is sometimes regarded as a water demon haunting deep ponds, oceans, and old marl pits (which often became filled with water to form ponds) where it dragged children into the depths, much like the grindylow and Jenny Greenteeth. Children were told to "keep away from the marl-pit or Rawhead and Bloody Bones will have you."

Ruth Tongue said in Somerset Folklore that he "lived in a dark cupboard, usually under the stairs. If you were heroic enough to peep through a crack you would get a glimpse of the dreadful, crouching creature, with blood running down his face, seated waiting on a pile of raw bones that had belonged to children who told lies or said bad words. If you peeped through the keyhole he got you anyway."

Old Bloody Bones is a Cornish version of Rawhead-and-Bloody-Bones according to F. W. Jones in Old Cornwall. Old Bloody Bones inhabited Knockers Hole near the village of Baldhu. There was said to have been a massacre in the area, and it is suggested that he was a ghost or evil spirit attracted by the carnage.

In the Southern United States, Rawhead and Bloody Bones are sometimes regarded as two individual creatures or two separate parts of the same monster. One is a skull stripped of skin that bites its victims (Rawhead) and its companion is a dancing headless skeleton (Bloody Bones). In one cautionary tale a gossip loses his head to the monster as punishment for his wicked tongue. Legends about Bloody Bones eventually made their way into African-American tradition as well as spreading to other parts of the United States.

== In popular culture ==
Rawhead Rex (1986) is a movie set in Ireland where Rawhead is unleashed on the countryside.

"Rawhead and Bloody Bones" (1988) is a song from the album Peepshow by English rock band Siouxsie and the Banshees.

The Anita Blake series book Bloody Bones (1996), a novel by Laurell K. Hamilton also deals with a version of Rawhead and Bloody Bones.

In the start of episode 12 in the first season (2005) of TV series Supernatural, the lead characters, Sam and Dean, are fighting a rawhead.

In the novel The Haunting of Alaizabel Cray (2006), Rawhead is the entity behind the Green Tack Murders.

A rawhead shows up in the first chapters of the Dresden Files novel Cold Days (2012).
