= Halfling =

Fictional race appearing in many fantasy works

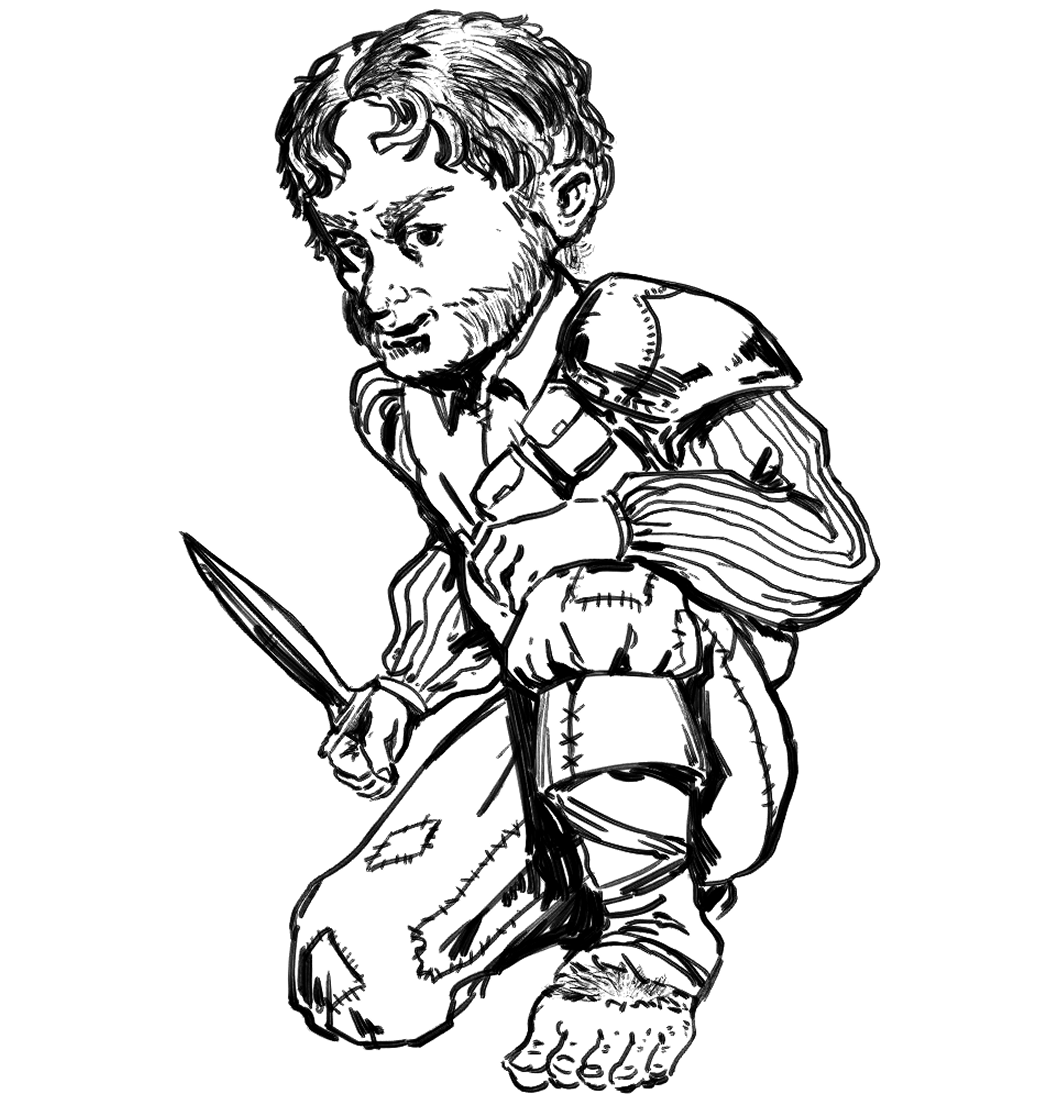
- An illustration of a halfling.
- Genre: Fantasy
- Other name: Hobbit

Halflings, sometimes called hobbits, are a fictional race found in some fantasy novels and games.

== Description ==
Halflings are often depicted as similar to humans except about half as tall, and are not quite as stocky as the similarly sized dwarves. They have slightly pointed ears along with leathery-soled feet which are covered with curly hair. They tend to be portrayed as stealthy and lucky.

== Etymology ==
Author J. R. R. Tolkien originated the race of halflings in his Middle-earth works, usually calling them "hobbits". The Oxford English Dictionary used to credit Tolkien with inventing the word hobbits, and Middle-earth Enterprises trademarked the term hobbits, but evidence of earlier use was discovered.

The term Halfling had previously been used in Scotland, Northern Ireland, and Northern England for a boy or girl who is not yet fully grown; a youth, an adolescent, and formerly sometimes a boy or young man employed in a junior role in domestic, agricultural, or industrial work. Halflin derives from the Scot word hauflin, which was used before both The Hobbit and Dungeons & Dragons and has the synonyms hobbledehoy and hobby.

== Usage in fantasy fiction ==
Author J. R. R. Tolkien included halflings in his Middle-earth works like 1937's The Hobbit and 1954–1955's The Lord of the Rings. The term has since been used in other fiction works as an alternate name for hobbit-like peoples inspired by Tolkien's legendarium.

A prominent example is Dungeons & Dragons (D&D), where halflings have long been one of the playable humanoid races. In the original 1974 Men & Magic, they were called hobbits, but later editions of the original D&D box set changed the name to halfling to avoid infringing on the trademark for the term hobbit. Besides licensed D&D novels, halfling characters have appeared in various tabletop and video games.

== Other uses ==
Some fantasy stories use the term halfling to describe a person born of a human parent and a parent of another race, often a female human and a male elf. Terry Brooks describes characters such as Shea Ohmsford from his Shannara series as a halfling of elf–human parentage. In Jack Vance's Lyonesse series of novels, "halfling" is a generic term for beings such as fairies, trolls and ogres, who are composed of both magical and earthly substances. In Clifford D. Simak's 1959 short story "No Life of Their Own", halflings are invisible beings in a parallel dimension who, like brownies or gremlins, bring good or bad luck to people.
