= Hans in Luck =

German fairy tale

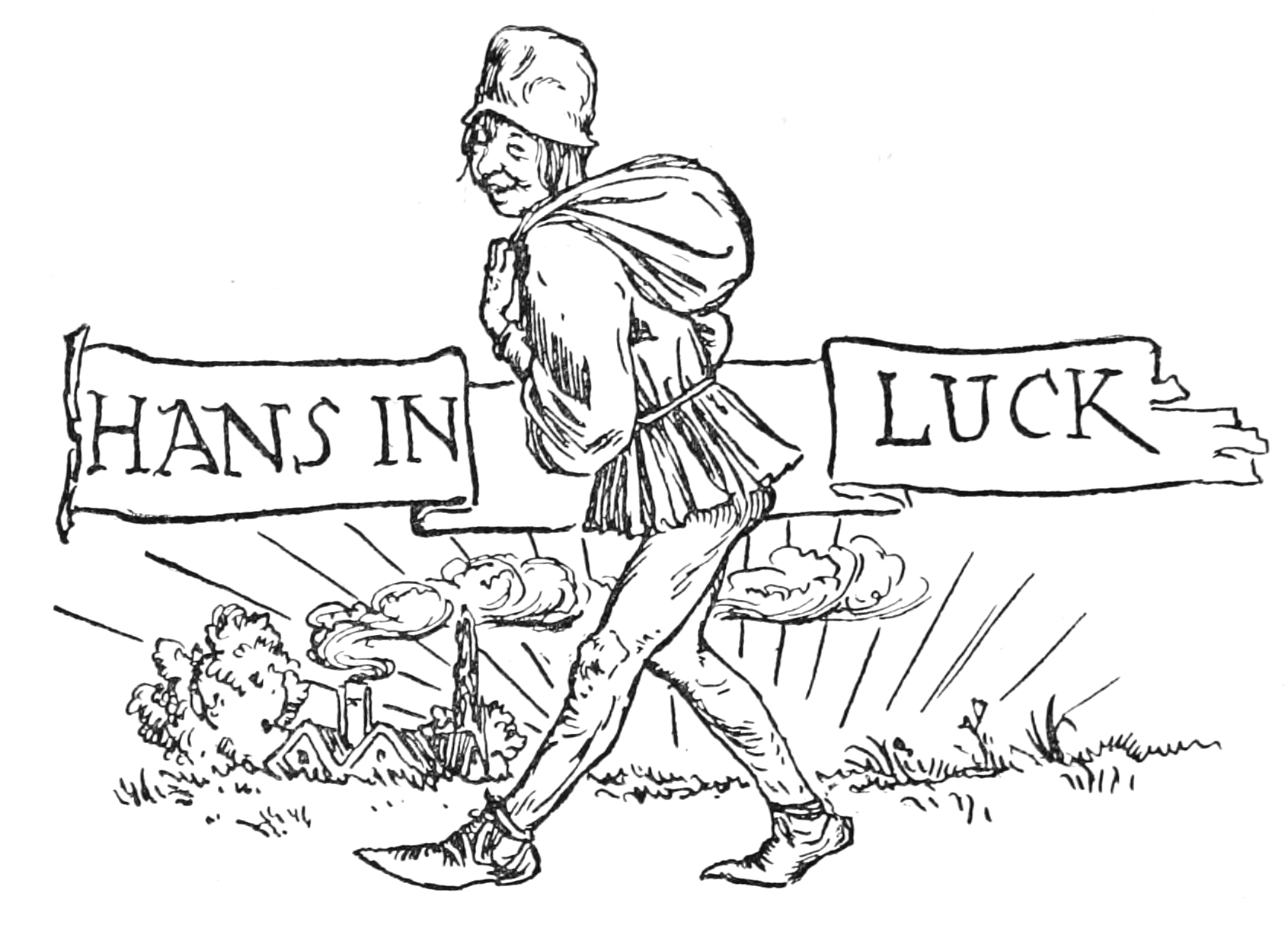
- 1912 illustration by Robert Anning Bell

Folk tale
- Name: Hans in Luck
- Country: Germany
- Region: Cassel
- Origin Date: 1812
- Published in: Grimm's Fairy Tales

"Hans in Luck" (German: Hans im Glück) is a fairy tale of Germanic origin, recorded by the Brothers Grimm. It is Aarne-Thompson type 1415 "Trading Away One's Fortune".

== Plot summary ==
Hans has been working hard for seven years but wishes to return to see his poor mother. His master pays him his wages which amounts to a lump of gold the size of his head. Hans puts the gold in a handkerchief and starts out on his journey jogging but soon becomes tired. He spots a rider on horseback and seeing the ease at which the horse travels he offers to exchange his lump of gold for the horse. Happy with the exchange, the man gives him the horse and Hans rides off.

The horse bolts and Hans gets bucked off, whereupon he meets a shepherd who convinces Hans to trade his horse for a cow. Telling Hans that a cow can provide milk, cheese and butter and is of more leisurely company. Hans takes up on the offer and continues his journey only to find that the cow is dry and not producing any milk as he had been told.

Disgruntled with the cow, Hans meets a butcher who gives him a pig for the cow. Thanking the butcher for the pig, Hans sets off jogging again, hopeful he has now found an ideal travel companion. Alas, Hans meets a countryman who informs him that the pig's owner is the squire and he is in danger of being arrested for taking the squire's pig. Hans takes the countryman's goose in exchange for his pig, happy that it will provide a good roast and a supply of goose fat.

At his next stop in a village, Hans meets a scissor-grinder and explains his story to him. The scissor-grinder offers him a grindstone for his goose arguing that a grindstone will provide a source of income. Hans happily exchanges the goose for the grindstone. He continues on his way, but is tired carrying the grindstone and is short of money for food.

Hans stops for a drink on the banks of a river, the grindstone falls into the deep water and is lost. Hans is happy to be rid of the heavy grindstone and being free of all troubles. He walks on to his mother's house and recounts his lucky tale.

== Analysis ==
=== Tale type ===
The tale is classified, in the international Aarne-Thompson-Uther Index, as type ATU 1415, "Lucky Hans", a tale type characterized by foolish bargains made by the titular foolish hero: the protagonist is paid for his service with a large gold nugget, which he trades for a horse, which he trades for a cow and other animals, until he eventually gains a whetstone which he drops in a well; losing each object gained in the chain of trades, he believes that he has made a fair deal, and is happy enough with the results of his trades.

=== Origins ===
"Hans in Luck" is a German folk tale recorded by the Brothers Grimm and published in the second edition of Grimm's Fairy Tales in 1819. It was based on a publication of the tale "Hans Wohlgemut" by Friedrich August Wernicke in magazine Wünschelruthe, 1818, issue 33. German folklorist Hans-Jörg Uther, in Enzyklopädie des Märchens, suggested that Wernicke's is a literary fairy tale, rather than a truly folk one, and argued that the stabilization of its structure (e.g., the chain of trades done by Hans) "prevented" its transmission as a legitimate oral tale.

=== Interpretation ===
"Hans in Luck" has been described as an ironic, humorous tale (schwank) which inverts the normal "rags to riches" story format: the story goes in the direction of anticlimax It can be interpreted as anti-materialistic as Hans trades in his newly won treasures and expresses relief to be freed from the weight to return home happily. Furthermore, Uther interprets Hans's character as carefree and naïve, who is yet cheerful and enjoying his personal happiness more than material gains.

It can also be set apart from many other folk and fairy tales as it avoids romantic themes, since the protagonist returns home without a bride; instead, he ends the story wanting to return home to his mother.

== Adaptations ==
The story has been adapted in several films: 1925, 1928, 1936, 1949, 1956; and later:

- de:Hans im Glück (1999)
- 2006: Hans im Glück – Tauschrausch im Märchenwald, an Austria/Germany parody from the series Die ProSieben Märchenstunde
- de:Hans im Glück (2015)

Some of the works titled Hans im Glück are only superficially related to the fairy tale, mostly due to the catchy title. These include:

- The TV film de:Hans im Glück (1976)
- The TV series de:Hans im Glück (Fernsehserie)

== Variants of the motif ==
The English fairy tale The Hedley Kow contains a similar sequence in which the main character persuades herself that every change is proof of her good luck.

American folklorist Arthur Fauset listed The Contented Old Lady as another variant.

A French variant, "Jean-Baptiste's Swaps," was collected by Paul Delarue.

Gudbrand on the Hill-side is a Norwegian variant.

Vance Randolph's anthology, The Devil's Pretty Daughter and Other Ozark Follk Tales, includes a variant entitled "Setting Down the Budget."

A Russian variant ("Barter"; pre-reform Russian: Мѣна, modern Russian: Мeна) was collected by Alexander Afanasyev in his Russian Fairy Tales, two Russian and one Ukrainian variants. It was translated into English by Norbert Guterman.
