= Thrummy-cap =

A Thrummy-cap is a character in Scottish folklore, that appears in many tales. It may have been invented by John Burness in his 1796 Thrummy Cap, A Legend of the Castle of Fiddes.

The poetic tale, Thrummy Cap, A Legend of the Castle of Fiddes (1796), written by John Burness (cousin of Robert Burns), was popular during the 19th century in the northeast of Scotland - it may be that Burness invented the legend. The name of the tale "Thrummy Cap" holds the name of one of its protagonists. Thrummy Cap encounters a ghost identical to himself (see also Doppelganger). This ghost shows Thrummy where the castle deeds are, which he had stolen from the Laird. This tale employs the restless ghost motif.

"Thrummy cap" was the name of a ghost in another legend in Methil. In the Methil tale, Thrummy Cap haunts a building at the harbor head - this was said to be the ghost of a wood merchant or carpenter, who was not paid for his work, and consequently drowned himself in Methil harbor, and took to haunting the building.

Additionally "thrummy cap" was a nickname for the devil.

In his 1848 Dictionary of Archaic & Provincial Words, James Halliwell-Philipps claimed the term was from Northumbrian fairy tales, and referred to a "queer-looking little auld man" with exploits taking place in vaults or cellars of old castles. "Thrummy Caps" also appear in Michael Aislabie Denham's 1850s list of spirits and fairies - in which Denham makes an unclear reference to the "Thrummy Hills" near Catterick, and also repeats the claim of it appearing in Northumbrian folktales.

== See also ==
- Castle of Fiddes
