= River monster =

River monster may refer to:

- Hudson River Monster, a creature in New York folklore
- Northern Kentucky River Monsters, a professional indoor football team
- River Monsters, a wildlife documentary television series
- White River Monster, a creature in Arkansas folklore

== See also ==
- Lake monster
- List of aquatic humanoids
- List of water deities
- Monster (disambiguation)
- Sea monster
- Water monster (disambiguation)
- Water spirit
