= Nelly Longarms =

Character in English folklore

Nelly Longarms (or Nellie Longarms) is a hag and water spirit in English folklore who dwells at the bottom of deep ponds, rivers and wells. Like the Grindylow, Peg Powler and Jenny Greenteeth she will reach out with her long sinewy arms and drag children beneath the water if they get too close. She is regarded as a bogeyman figure who is invoked by parents to frighten children into appropriate behaviour.

The legend finds its origins around St Margaret's Garth, Durham, England. Residents have reported sightings and strange sounds, especially at night, since the early 18th Century. Nelly Longarms must typically be invited into a property for her to drag children into the water, and most sightings of the spirit are at the threshold of properties, often heard slamming or opening doors.
