= Eagles in Middle-earth =

Animal from J. R. R. Tolkien's legendarium

Eagles
- "Bilbo Woke Up with the Early Sun in His Eyes" by J.R.R. Tolkien, first published in a 1938 edition of The Hobbit

In-universe information
- Creation date: First Age
- Home world: Middle-earth
- Base of operations: Encircling Mountains, Misty Mountains
- Leader: Thorondor, Gwaihir

In J. R. R. Tolkien's Middle-earth, the Eagles or Great Eagles (Note: Tolkien 1954a "The Council of Elrond") (Note: Tolkien 1977, "Of the Ruin of Doriath") are immense birds that are sapient and can speak. The Great Eagles resemble actual eagles, but are much larger. Thorondor is said to have been the greatest of all birds, with a wingspan of 30 fathoms (55 m; 180 ft). (Note: Tolkien 1977, "Of the Return of the Noldor") Elsewhere, the Eagles have varied in nature and size both within Tolkien's writings and in later adaptations.

Scholars have noticed that the Eagles appear as agents of eucatastrophe or deus ex machina throughout Tolkien's writings, from The Silmarillion and the accounts of Númenor to The Hobbit and The Lord of the Rings. Where Elves are good, and fully sentient, and Orcs bad, Eagles amongst other races are in between; the Hobbit Bilbo Baggins fears he will become their supper, torn up like a rabbit, and is indeed served rabbit for supper. The scholar Marjorie Burns notes, too, that Gandalf's association with Eagles is reminiscent of the god Odin in Norse mythology. Others have seen Biblical echoes, especially when the Eagle-messenger sings of the final victory to Faramir in phrases reminiscent of Psalm 24.

== Context ==
J. R. R. Tolkien was an English author and philologist of ancient Germanic languages, specialising in Old English; he spent much of his career as a professor at the University of Oxford. He is best known for his novels about his invented Middle-earth, The Hobbit and The Lord of the Rings, and for the posthumously published The Silmarillion which provides a more mythical narrative about earlier ages. He invented several peoples for Middle-earth, including Elves, Dwarves, Hobbits, Orcs, Trolls, and Eagles, among others. A devout Roman Catholic, he described The Lord of the Rings as "a fundamentally religious and Catholic work", rich in Christian symbolism.

== Appearances ==
=== First Age ===
Throughout The Silmarillion, the Eagles are associated with Manwë, the ruler of the sky and Lord of the Valar. It is stated that "spirits in the shape of hawks and eagles" brought news from Middle-earth to his halls upon Taniquetil, the highest mountain in Valinor, (Note: Tolkien 1977, "Of the Beginning of Days") and in the Valaquenta of "all swift birds, strong of wing". (Note: Tolkien 1977, "Valaquenta") Upon their first appearance in the main narrative, it is stated that the Eagles had been "sent forth" to Middle-earth by Manwë, to live in the mountains north of the land of Beleriand, to "watch upon" Morgoth, and to help the exiled Noldorin Elves "in extreme cases". (Note: Tolkien 1993, "The Annals of Aman") The Eagles were ruled by Thorondor, "Lord of the Eagles", and "mightiest of all birds that have ever been". (Note: Tolkien 1977, "Of the Noldor in Beleriand") (Note: Tolkien 1977, "Of the Ruin of Beleriand") When Turgon built the Hidden City of Gondolin, the eagles of Thorondor became his allies, bringing him news and keeping spies and Orcs away. (Note: Tolkien 1977, "Of Tuor and the Fall of Gondolin") (Note: Tolkien 1980, "Of Tuor and His Coming to Gondolin", and note 25) The eagles' watch was redoubled after the coming of Tuor, enabling Gondolin to remain undiscovered longer than any other Elvish kingdom in Beleriand. When the city fell, the eagles protected the fugitives from ambushing orcs. The Eagles fought alongside the army of the Valar, Elves, and Men during the War of Wrath at the end of the First Age. In The Silmarillion it is recounted that after the appearance of winged dragons, "all the great birds of heaven" gathered under the leadership of Thorondor to Eärendil, and destroyed the majority of the dragons in an aerial battle. (Note: Tolkien 1977, "Of the Voyage of Eärendil")

=== Second Age ===
On the island of Númenor in the Second Age, three Eagles guarded the summit of the holy mountain Meneltarma, appearing whenever anyone approached it, and staying in the sky during the Númenórean "Three Prayers" religious ceremony. The Númenóreans called them "the Witnesses of Manwë", believing he had sent them from Aman "to keep watch upon the Holy Mountain and upon all the land". (Note: Tolkien 1980, "A Description of Númenor") Another eyrie upon the tower of the King's House in the capital Armenelos was always inhabited by a pair of eagles, until the days of Tar-Ancalimon and the coming of Shadow to Númenor. Many eagles lived upon the hills around Sorontil in the north of the island. When the Númenóreans began to speak openly against the Ban of the Valar, Manwë appeared as eagle-shaped storm clouds, called the "Eagles of the Lords of the West", to try to reason with or threaten them. (Note: Tolkien 1977, "Akallabêth")

=== Third Age ===
By the end of the Third Age, a colony of Eagles lived in the north of the Misty Mountains, as described in The Hobbit. These Eagles opposed the goblins; however, their relationship with the local Woodmen was only cool, as the eagles often hunted their sheep. (Note: Tolkien 1937, "Out of the Frying-Pan and into the Fire") They rescued Thorin's company from a band of goblins and Wargs, ultimately carrying the dwarves to the Carrock. (Note: Tolkien 1937, "Queer Lodgings") Later, having seen the mustering of goblins in the Mountains, a great flock of Eagles participated in the Battle of the Five Armies. (Note: Tolkien 1937, "The Return Journey")

In The Lord of the Rings, the Eagles of the Misty Mountains helped the Elves of Rivendell and the Wizard Radagast to gather news of the Orcs. (Note: Tolkien 1954a, "The Ring Goes South"; "A Journey in the Dark") Gwaihir the Windlord carries news to Isengard, rescues the wizard Gandalf from the top of the tower there, and again rescues Gandalf from the top of Celebdil after searching for him at Galadriel's request. (Note: Tolkien 1954, "The White Rider") Gwaihir and his Eagles appear in great numbers towards the end of the book. The Eagles similarly arrive at the Battle of the Morannon, helping the Host of the West against the Nazgûl, while Gwaihir, Landroval, and Meneldor rescue Frodo Baggins and Samwise Gamgee from Mount Doom after the One Ring had been destroyed. (Note: Tolkien 1955 "The Field of Cormallen")

== Analysis ==
=== Origins ===
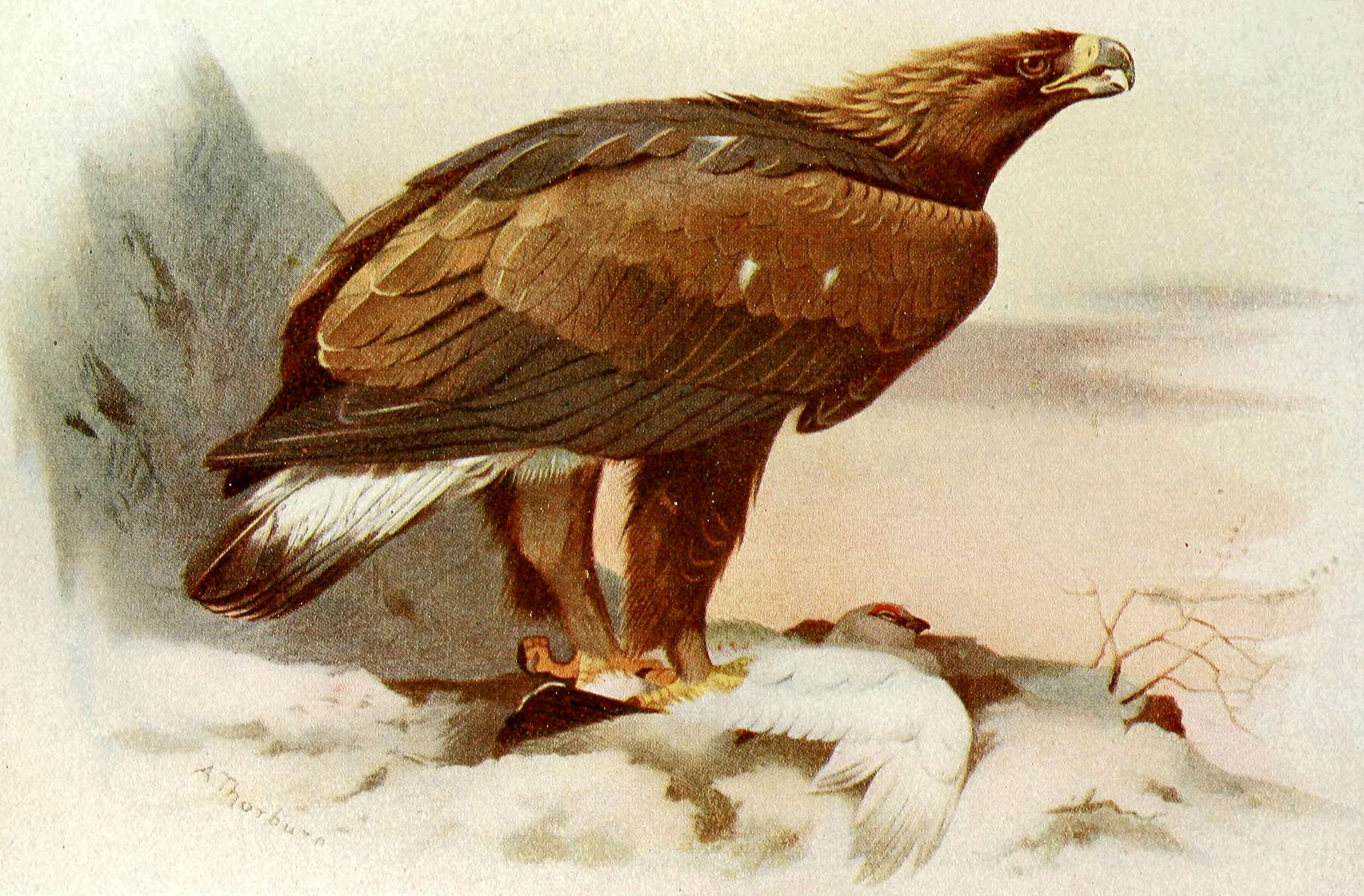
Tolkien based his painting of an eagle in The Hobbit on this 1919 illustration of an immature golden eagle by Archibald Thorburn. (Note: Tolkien 1979 plate 9)

Tolkien's painting of an eagle on a crag appears in some editions of The Hobbit. According to Christopher Tolkien, the author based this picture on a painting by the Scottish ornithological artist Archibald Thorburn of an immature golden eagle, which Christopher found for him in Thomas Coward's 1919 book The Birds of the British Isles and Their Eggs. (Note: Tolkien 1937, Foreword to the 50th-anniversary edition)

The Great Eagles appeared in "The Fall of Gondolin", the first tale about Middle-earth that Tolkien wrote in the late 1910s. (Note: Tolkien 1984b "The Fall of Gondolin") In Tolkien's early writings, the eagles were distinguished from other birds: (Note: Tolkien 1986, "Ambarkanta") common birds could keep aloft only within the lower layer of the space above the Earth, (Note: Tolkien 1987, "The Fall of Númenor", (i)) while the Eagles of Manwë could fly "beyond the lights of heaven to the edge of darkness". (Note: Tolkien 1987, "Ainulindalë") The eagle-shaped clouds that appeared in Númenor formed one of Tolkien's recurring images of the downfall of the island; (Note: Tolkien 1992, "The Notion Club Papers") they appear, too, in his abandoned time-travel stories, The Lost Road and The Notion Club Papers. (Note: Tolkien 1987, "The Lost Road", (ii))

=== Sentient beings ===
Tolkien faced the question of the Great Eagles' nature with apparent hesitation. In early writings there was no need to define it precisely, since he imagined that, beside the Valar, "many lesser spirits... both great and small" had entered the Eä upon its creation; (Note: Tolkien 1987, "Quenta Silmarillion", §2) and such sapient creatures as the Eagles or Huan the Hound, in Tolkien's own words, "have been rather lightly adopted from less 'serious' mythologies". (Note: Tolkien 1993, "Myths Transformed", VIII) The phrase "spirits in the shape of hawks and eagles" in The Silmarillion derives from that stage of writing. After completing The Lord of the Rings, Tolkien moved toward a more carefully defined "system" of creatures. At the top were incarnates or Children of Ilúvatar: Elves and Men, those who possessed fëar or souls, with the defining characteristic of being able to speak; (Note: Tolkien 1994, "Quendi and Eldar") next were self-incarnates, the Valar and Maiar, "angelic" spirits that "arrayed" themselves in bodily forms of the incarnates or of animals, (Note: Tolkien 1993, "Myths Transformed", (VIII)) and were able to communicate both by thought and speech; and finally animals, mere beasts, unable to speak. For some time Tolkien considered the Eagles as bird-shaped Maiar; however, he realised that the statement about Gwaihir and Landroval's descent from Thorondor had already appeared in print in The Lord of the Rings, while he had long before rejected the notion of their being "Children" of the Valar and Maiar. (Note: Tolkien 1993, "The Annals of Aman"; "The Later Quenta Silmarillion", ch. 1) In the last of his notes on this topic, dated by his son Christopher to the late 1950s, Tolkien decided that the Great Eagles were animals that had been "taught language by the Valar, and raised to a higher level—but they still had no fëar [souls]."

The Tolkien scholars Paul Kocher and Tom Shippey note that in The Hobbit, the narrator provides a firm moral framework, with good elves, evil goblins, and the other peoples like dwarves and eagles somewhere in between. Shippey remarks that the eagles are in the narrator's "euphemistic" words, "not kindly birds". Marjorie Burns comments that the "threat of being eaten [by the Eagle] is so dominant" that the Hobbit Bilbo, who the Eagle described as being rather like a rabbit, is afraid of being torn up and eaten; he is relieved that he is not to become their supper, "but rabbit is precisely what the eagles do bring them for supper".

=== Norse mythology ===
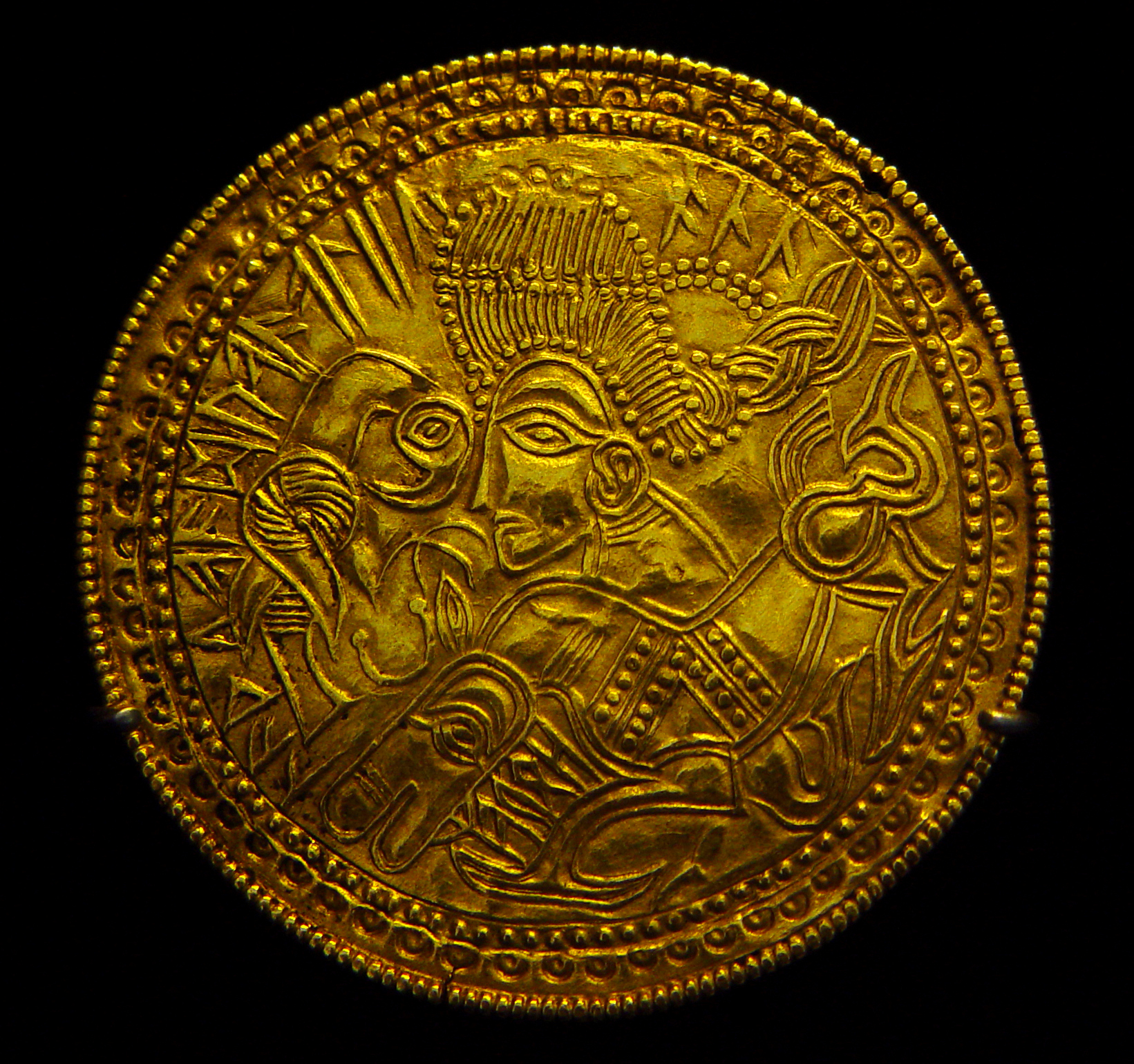
The Norse god Odin, like Gandalf, was associated with eagles. A bird with a hooked beak beside Odin (named as houaz, "the high") on a bracteate from Funen, Denmark

In Norse mythology, eagles were associated with the god Odin; for example, he escapes from Jotunheim back to Asgard as an eagle. Burns remarks the similarity with Gandalf, who repeatedly escapes by riding on an eagle. She comments that Tolkien's Eagles, like his Dwarves, Dragons, and Trolls, all signal Norse influence on his stories.

=== Deus ex machina ===
Burns notes that Tolkien uses the Eagles three times to save his protagonists: to rescue Bilbo and company in The Hobbit; to lift Gandalf from imprisonment by Saruman in the tower of Orthanc; and finally, to save Frodo and Sam from Mount Doom when they have destroyed the One Ring. The Tolkien scholar Jane Chance describes these interventions as a deus ex machina, a sudden and unexpected mechanism to bring about a eucatastrophe. The screenwriter Brad Johnson, writing in Script, argues that this last deus ex machina instance is a complete surprise to the audience, and undesirable as the sudden appearance of the Eagles "takes the audience out of the scene emotionally". Tolkien was aware of this problem, recognising the risky nature of the mechanism; in one of his letters, he wrote: (Note: Carpenter 2023, #210 to F. Ackerman, June 1958)

The Eagles are a dangerous 'machine'. I have used them sparingly, and that is the absolute limit of their credibility or usefulness. The alighting of a Great Eagle of the Misty Mountains in the Shire is absurd; it also makes the later capture of G[andalf] by Saruman incredible, and spoils the account of his escape".

=== Biblical messenger ===
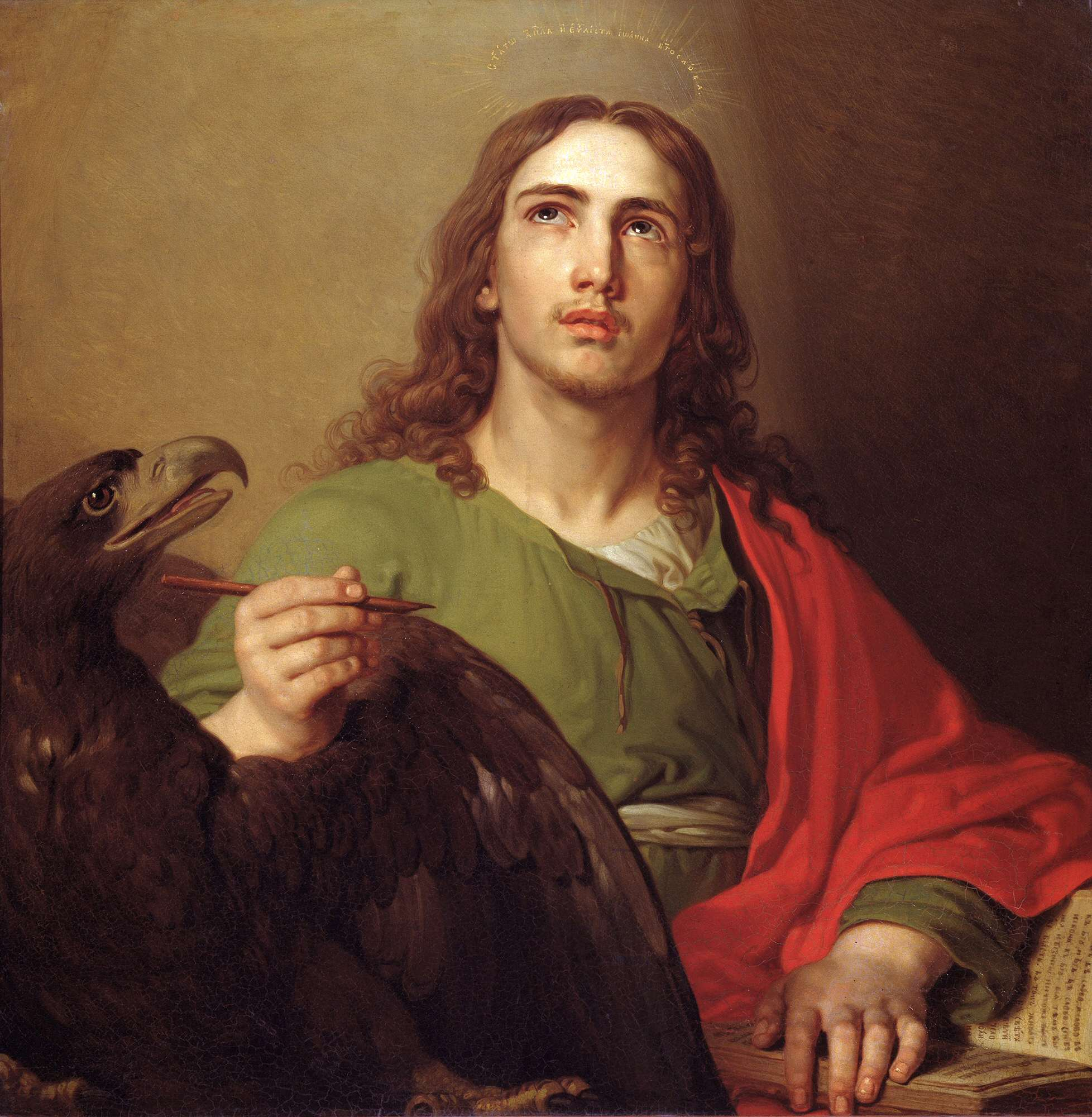
Scholars have linked the Eagles to Christianity, as an Eagle is John the Evangelist's traditional symbol. Icon of St John with eagle, Kazan Cathedral, St. Petersburg

Shippey notes that throughout The Lord of the Rings Tolkien carefully avoided direct reference to Christianity, so as not to make the story an allegory. He comments however that in one place "Revelation seems very close and allegory does all but break through", namely the eucatastrophic moment when the Eagle-messenger sings to Faramir about Frodo and Sam's destruction of the One Ring:

Sing now, ye people in the Tower of Anor
for the realm of Sauron is ended for ever,
and the Dark Tower is thrown down.

Sing and rejoice, ye people of the Tower of Guard,
for your watch hath not been in vain,
and the Black Gate is broken,
and your King hath passed through,
and he is victorious.

Shippey writes that this is certainly Biblical, indeed that it is specifically in the style of Psalm 24 in the King James Version of the Bible, with its phrases "Lift up your heads, O ye gates, and be ye lift up, ye everlasting doors, for the King of glory shall come in". E. L. Risden, making a different connection with Christianity, describes the Eagles' rescue of Frodo and Sam as a "ritual rebirth", and the rescuing bird as "a symbol of the spirit", John the Evangelist's traditional symbol.

== Adaptations ==
Different adaptations of Tolkien's books treated both the nature of the Eagles and their role in the plots with varying level of faithfulness to originals. The first scenario for an animated motion-picture of The Lord of the Rings proposed to Tolkien in 1957 was turned down because of several cardinal deviations, among which Tolkien's biographer Humphrey Carpenter recorded that "virtually all walking was dispensed with in the story and the Company of the Ring were transported everywhere on the backs of eagles".

According to the fantasy artist Larry Dixon, the digitally animated eagles in Peter Jackson's The Lord of the Rings film trilogy were based on a stuffed golden eagle he had provided to Weta Workshop. Two large sculptures of the eagles from the trilogy were installed in Wellington Airport in 2013, each having a wingspan of 50 feet (15 m) and weighing 2,600 pounds (1,200 kg). They were removed in 2025.

In the 2011 video game The Lord of the Rings: War in the North, an eagle named Beleram acts as a supporting character, aiding the players in battle.
