= Qallupilluit =

Inuit mythological creature

Creature information
- Other name(s): Inuktitut: ᖃᓪᓗᐱᓪᓗᐃᑦ; Qalupalik
- Similar entities: Bogeyman Jenny Greenteeth
- Folklore: Mythical creature

Origin
- Region: Nunavut, Alaska

In Inuit mythology, the Qallupilluit or Qalupalik are creatures that live along Arctic shorelines near ice floes. They are said to steal children that wander too close to the water. This myth is believed to serve the purpose of protecting children from a dangerous environment, such as keeping them from playing on hazardous sea ice.

== Appearance ==
The accounts of the appearance of the Qallupilluit differ across tales, but there are some commonalities. The Qallupilluit is often described as having green, slimy skin, long hair, and long fingernails. Their hands are webbed like an aquatic creature, along with scales and fins. It wears an amautik, an Inuit parka mostly worn by women. Some say that their parkas are made of eider duck feathers and are used to carry kidnapped children. It is said to have two flippers, one is able to emit a shrill sound that paralyzes its victims. They also have the ability to alter their appearance, through a technique known as pilutitaminik.

While some interpretations include the pronoun 'he', the Qallupilluit is predominantly described in a feminine manner. It is said that the Qallupilluik uses the abducted children to maintain her long, flowing hair.

== Mythology ==
They lurk under the water in the Arctic regions of the world, living along the coast. The Qallupilluit hunt along the ice floes, kidnapping children that wander too close. One strategy they use for hunting is to emit an ethereal hum that will draw children closer to the water so they can be pulled in. Accounts vary as to what actually happens to the taken children. Some versions say that the child is simply devoured, while others say that they are held in a stasis-like state and used to fuel the youth of the Qallupilluit like sirens luring in their prey of sailors, and they have harpy like qualities given the fact that they take away misbehaving children or are offered them upon prayers .

Qallupilluit can be outsmarted by its targets. They are said to be invulnerable in their natural state, but some clever Inuit hunters found a way to bypass this. They would call out to it, and ask it to change shape for them, usually into something like a seal or a whale. Then, they could kill it and bring home a valuable catch.

There are tales of children willingly being given to a Qallupilluit. One such tale is about a grandmother and her grandson, struggling without food. The grandmother called upon a Qallupilluit to come and take him away, as she was not able to feed him and he would be better off. Once the tribe was able to successfully hunt again, a young Inuit couple took it upon themselves to retrieve the child. They were able to track him down, tethered to a piece of seaweed by the Qallupilluit so he could not escape her. However, they were not able to retrieve him because the Qallupilluik would drag him back under the waves whenever they got too close. They stealthily hid nearby all night long, and cut him loose once the sun rose. This tale has different variations, some versions have the grandmother giving the child to the Qallupilluit as a punishment, or becoming a great hunter after being rescued.

== In media ==
- The Qallupilluit is featured in the popular children's book A Promise Is A Promise by Robert Munsch and Michael Kusugak. In the story, a young Inuk child must outwit the Qallupilluit in order to save her siblings.
- The Qallupilluit is featured in the graphic novel Putuguq & Kublu & the Qalupalik by Roselynn Akulukjuk and Danny Christopher.
- The Qallupilluit is featured in the indie game Beneath Floes, which was released to critical acclaim.
