= Castle of Fiddes =

Tower house in Aberdeenshire, Scotland

Coordinates: 56°55′20.95″N 2°17′24.81″W

The Castle of Fiddes is a 16th-century tower house in Aberdeenshire, Scotland, located around 6 kilometres (3.7 mi) south-west of Stonehaven. It is dated 1592 on a window lintel, with a later date of 1673 on the east wall suggesting a renovation at this time. It was the property of the Arbuthnott family, who sold it in the later 17th century to the Thomson family of Arduthie. It was modernised around 1930 and remains occupied. It is a category A listed building.

The four-storey tower is built on an unusual variant of the L-plan, with a large circular stair tower and several projecting turrets supported on corbels.

== See also ==
- Thrummy-cap, ghost tale by John Burness associated with the castle.
