= Hobley =

Surname

Hobley is a surname.

A possible meaning is "The little people from the meadow", derived from a combination of the words "hob" and "ley". In Middle English, the word "hob" means a hobgoblin, sprite, or elf, and "ley" is a grassy meadow.

Despite the spelling, the name is pronounced with an "obb" not an "obe". This is probably because it is a combination of two words, and the pronunciation has not changed as the words have combined.

Notable people with the name include:

- Amelia Dyer (1837–1896; née Hobley), English serial killer and baby farmer
- Charles William Hobley (1867–1947), pioneering British colonial administrator in Kenya
- Hannah Hobley (born 1988), British actress and singer
- John William Dixon Hobley (1929–1993), British lawyer, Attorney General of Bermuda and then Hong Kong
- Liffort Hobley (born 1962), American football player (born 1962)
- McDonald Hobley (1917–1987), British actor, early television announcer, presenter and commentator
- Pamela Hobley, American teenager who disappeared in 1969
- Peter Hobley Davison (1926–2002), British professor of English
- Tina Hobley (born 1971), British television actress and radio presenter

== See also ==
- Anthene hobleyi, also known as the Hobley's hairtail
