= Bicorn and Chichevache =

Medieval fabulous beasts used to satirize marriage relationships

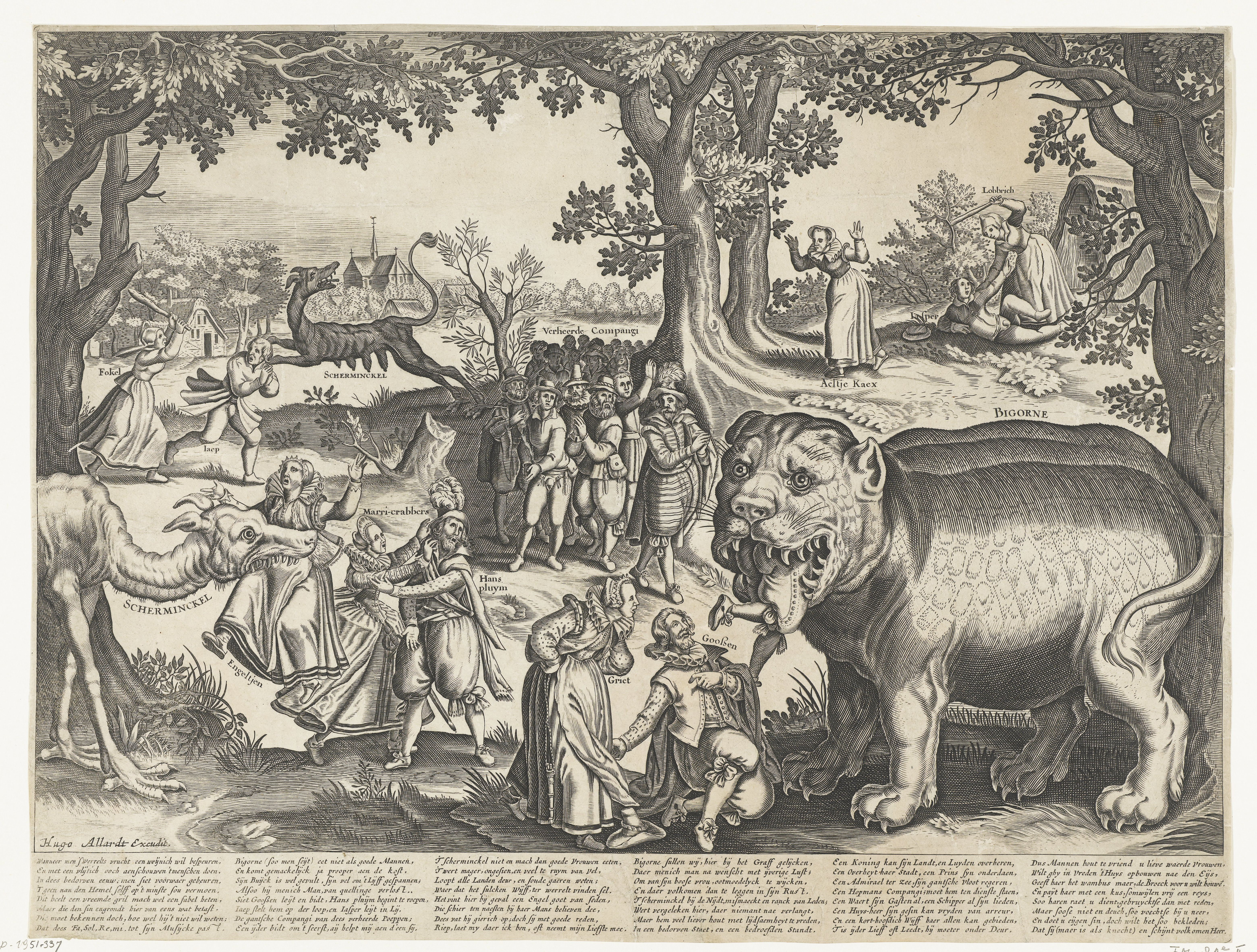
17th-century engraving of Bicorn and Chichevache. Print published by Hugo Allard. Original artist unknown. Collection if the Rijksmuseum, Amsterdam

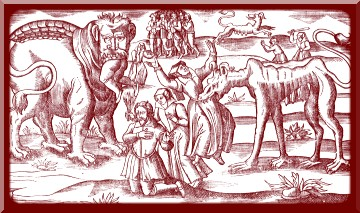
17th-century engraving of Bicorn and Chichevache

Bicorn and Chichevache are fabulous beasts that appear in European satirical works of the Middle Ages and Renaissance. Bicorn is a creature—part panther, part cow, with a human-like face—that devours kind-hearted and devoted husbands and (because of their abundance) is plump and well fed. Chichevache, on the other hand, devours obedient wives and (because of their scarcity) is thin and starving.

== Chaucer ==
Geoffrey Chaucer mentions Chichevache in the envoy of the Clerk's Tale in his Canterbury Tales, ironically warning wives against the patience and obedience shown by Griselda in the story:

O noble wyves, ful of heigh prudence,
Lat noon humylitee youre tonge naille,
Ne lat no clerk have cause or diligence
To write of yow a storie of swich mervaille
As of Grisildis pacient and kynde,
Lest Chichevache yow swelwe in hire entraille! (ll. 1183–1188)

Chaucer may have borrowed the French term chichifache ("thin face") and blended it with vache ("cow") to make the similar term chichevache ("thin or meagre cow"). D. Laing Purves notes that "The origin of the fable was French; but Lydgate has a ballad on the subject. 'Chichevache' literally means 'niggardly' or 'greedy cow'."

== Lydgate ==
In the early fifteenth century John Lydgate wrote "Bycorne and Chychevache", a 133-line poem in 7-line stanzas, probably from a French original. Written "at the request of a worthy citizen of London" to accompany a tapestry or painted wall-hanging, the poem is accompanied by instructions for pictorial representations. Lydgate describes the two beasts as husband and wife.

== In popular culture ==
- A bicorn is mentioned in Harry Potter and the Chamber of Secrets. Its powdered horn is used as an ingredient in Polyjuice Potion.
- The science fiction manga Battle Angel Alita: Last Order features giant, bioengineered monsters named Bicorne and Chichevache.
- Bicorns are a recurring creature in the Megami Tensei video game franchise.
- A bicorn is featured in the Overlord light-novel and anime series.
- A bicorn is featured in a chapter of the fantasy manga Delicious in Dungeon, appearing as a black horse with two horns. In the manga, the bicorn devours devoted husbands and is attracted to corrupt individuals.
- A bicorn is mentioned in Schitt's Creek season 5, episode 13, "The Hike". The bicorn is used metaphorically for its reputation of endangering husbands' lives.
