= Home dels nassos =

Catalan mythological character

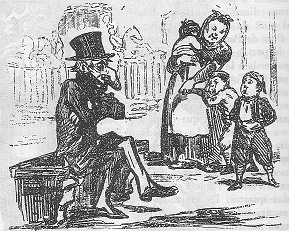
Home dels Nassos

Home dels nassos (Catalan pronunciation: [ˈɔmə ðəlz ˈnasus]; "Hombre de las Narices"; "Man of the noses" ) is a mythological character whose tradition is kept in Catalonia and other regions from Spain like Aragon, La Rioja, Navarre, Álava, Burgos, etc. The legend says that this man has as many noses as the year has days, and loses one every day and can only be seen on December 31. In this way, children of Catalonia are led to believe that there is a man with 365 noses, and they are asked to search him on last day of the year. Being the last day of the year, he has only one nose remaining, the rest have been already lost. The first person to arrive in the house on December 31st, or Saint Sebastian's eve, would play the part of Home dels nassos.
