= Peg Powler =

Hag and water spirit in English folklore

Peg Powler is a hag and water spirit in English folklore who inhabits the River Tees. Similar to the Grindylow, Jenny Greenteeth, and Nelly Longarms, she drags children into the water if they get too close to the edge. She is regarded as a bogeyman figure who is invoked by parents to frighten children into proper behaviour. The 19th century folklorist William Henderson describes Peg Powler as having green hair and "an insatiable desire for human life" and she is said to lure people into the river to drown or be devoured. The foam or froth which is often seen floating on certain parts of the Tees is called "Peg Powler's suds" or "Peg Powler's cream".

A similar creature named Nanny Powler is said to haunt the River Skerne, a tributary of the Tees. Michael Denham regards her as either the sister or daughter of Peg Powler.

Elliott O'Donnell paints a somewhat different picture of Peg Powler in his 1924 book Ghosts, Helpful and Harmful. He describes her as a spirit who lures men and boys to their doom in the River Tees by appearing as a beautiful young woman with green hair and pretending to drown so that her victim will enter the water in an attempt to save her. She may even appear on land on foggy nights and lead men astray until they stumble into the river.
