= Lagahoo =

Mythical shapeshifting monster seen in Trinidad and Tobago

In the folklore of Trinidad and Tobago the Lagahoo or Lugarhou is a mythical shapeshifting monster. It is cousin to the French and the Germanic werewolf .

It seems like a normal human by day, but this creature takes on the form of a man with no head, who roams the night with a wooden coffin on its neck. On top of the coffin are three lighted candles and the long loose end of a heavy iron chain, noosed around its waist, trails behind him. Often, it is seen with chains around its neck, which change size. One appendage is said to be turned backwards.

It can shapeshift into various animals, including horses, pigs or goats, and said to often take the form of a creature similar to a centaur; it is also thought to be a blood sucker which is less than particular about its food source, making do with such animals as cows and goats. The Lagahoo also possesses the ability to alter its size from tiny to gigantic in an instant.

To kill the Lagahoo one must beat the creature with a stick which has been anointed with holy water and holy oil for nine days. While beating the demon, it changes into other beasts such as a snarling dog, horse, cat, and pig, a wild bull and thunderous waves of water and finally will disappear into a black mist.

== In popular culture ==
In Wayne Gerard Trotman's science fiction novel, Veterans of the Psychic Wars, Soraya Doyle, a Trinidadian character, repeatedly refers to a shapeshifting alien as a Ligahoo.

In the novel Kaya Abaniah and the Father of the Forest by Wayne Gerard Trotman, a psychotic shapeshifter from another planet has been impersonating several of Trinidad and Tobago’s folkloric characters, including Ligahoo.

The Lagahoo of James Christopher Aboud’s 2004 poetry anthology, Lagahoo Poems, is an ageless, restless wanderer who "takes his shape from the wind" and "has no master", except his own hunger and desire.

In Escape From Silk Cotton Forest by Francis Escayg, the Lagahoo are not all evil. They actually want to be part of a peaceful society. However, due to their "different" appearance - in this case they look like canine-humanoids with totally white eyes and can replicate the traits of the species they change into - they take the forms of several local species, goans and douans being the most mentioned

Mentioned in the 2015 children's novel "The Jumbies" by Tracey Baptiste.
