= Brag (folklore) =

Goblin in Northumbrian folklore

A brag is a mischievous shapeshifting goblin in the folklore of Northumbria (Northumberland and Durham) and often takes the form of a horse or donkey. It is fond of letting unsuspecting humans ride on its back before bucking them off into a pond or bush and running away laughing. One notable example is the Picktree Brag that was said to take other unusual forms such as a calf with a white handkerchief around its neck, a naked headless man, and even four men holding a white sheet. A brag at Humbleknowe was never seen but made hideous noises in the night.

== Popular culture ==
Gary the Horse, from the webcomic Bad Machinery, identifies himself as a brag after bucking Shauna Wickle into the water after convincing her to take a ride on his back.

== See also ==
- A Midsummer Night's Dream
- Dunnie
- Hedley Kow
- Púca
- Kelpie
- Nuggle
- Tangie
- Nixie (folklore)
