= Bugbear =

Creature from myth

A bugbear is a legendary creature or type of hobgoblin comparable to the boogeyman (or bugaboo or babau or cucuy), and other creatures of folklore, all of which were historically used in some cultures to frighten disobedient children.

== Etymology ==
Its name is derived from the Middle English word "bugge" (a frightening thing), or perhaps the Old Welsh word bwg (evil spirit or goblin), or Old Scots bogill (goblin), and cognates most probably English "bogeyman" and "bugaboo".

In medieval England, the bugbear was depicted as a creepy bear that lurked in the woods to scare children. It was described in this manner in the play The Buggbears, an adaptation, with additions, from Antonio Francesco Grazzini’s La Spiritata (‘The Possessed [Woman]’, 1561).

In a modern context, the term bugbear may also mean pet peeve.

== In popular culture ==
Bugbears appear in a number of modern fantasy literature and related media, where they are usually minor antagonists. They also appear as monsters, described as large, hairy goblinoids, in the canon of popular fantasy role-playing games.

== See also ==
- Moss people
- Nachtkrapp
- Bogeyman
- Sprite (creature)
- Ghost
- Goblin
- Wirry-cow
- Yōkai
