= Wirry-cow =

Scottish word

In Scotland, a wirry-cow (Scots pronunciation: [ˈwɪɾɪkʌu̯, ˈwʌɾɪkʌu̯]) is a bugbear, goblin, ghost, ghoul or other frightful object. Sometimes the term is used for the Devil or a scarecrow.

Draggled sae 'mang muck and stanes, They looked like wirry-cows

— Allan Ramsay

The word was used by Sir Walter Scott in his novel Guy Mannering.

The word is derived by John Jamieson from worry (Modern Scots wirry), in its old sense of harassment in both English and Lowland Scots, from Old English wyrgan cognate with Dutch wurgen and German würgen; and cowe, a hobgoblin, an object of terror.

Wirry appears in several other compound words such as wirry hen, a ruffianly character, a rogue; wirry-boggle, a rogue, a rascal; and wirry-carle, a snarling, ill-natured person, one who is dreaded as a bugbear.
