= The Hedley Kow =

English fairytale

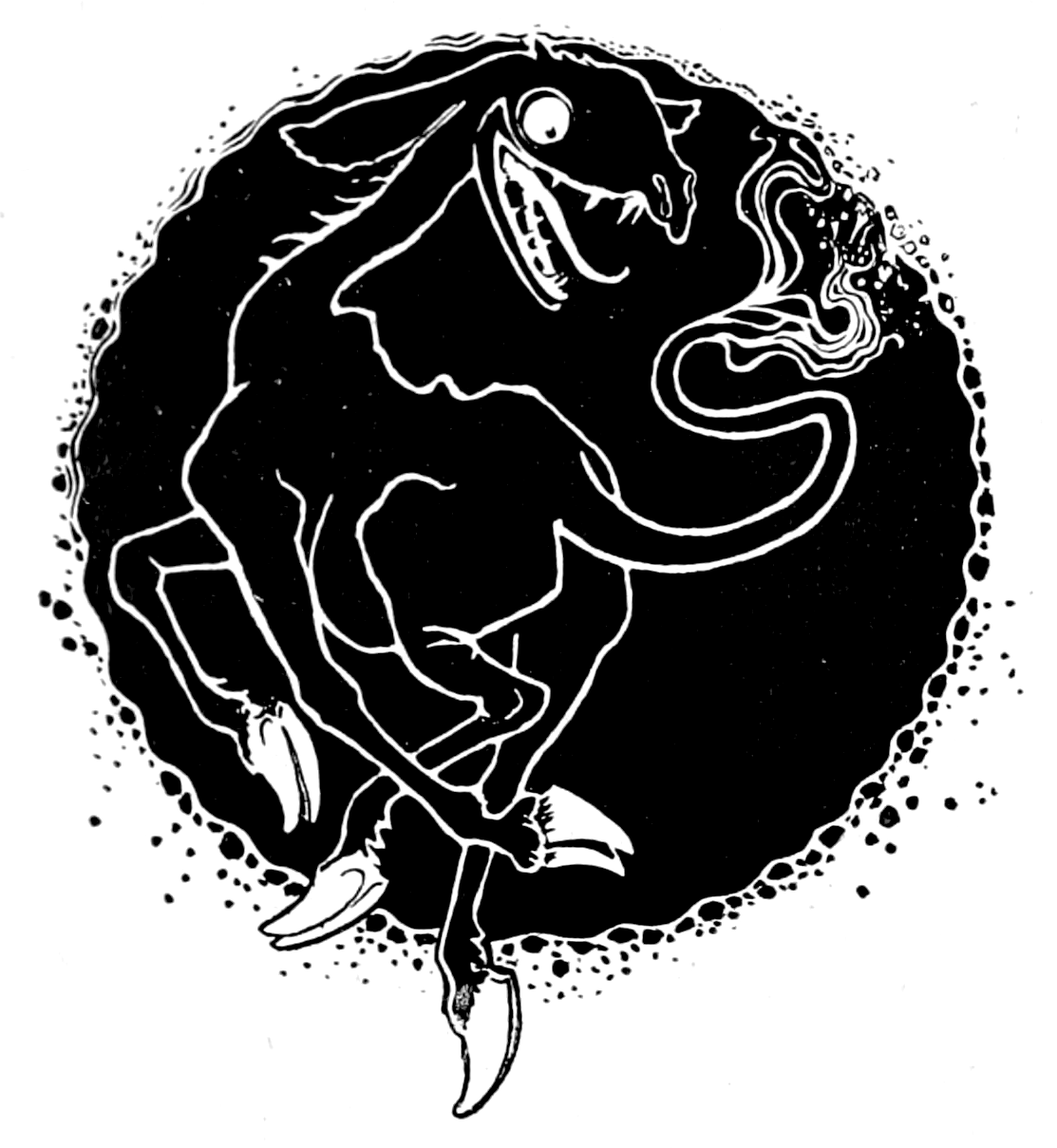
1894 illustration by John D. Batten

"The Hedley Kow" is an English fairy tale, particular to the village of Hedley on the Hill in Northumberland. It was collected by Joseph Jacobs in More English Fairy Tales in 1894. The story concerns a shapeshifting trickster known as the Hedley Kow.

Flora Annie Steel included in English Fairy Tales, renaming it "The Bogey Beast".

== Synopsis ==
A poor woman finds a pot on the road. She thinks it must have a hole for it to be discarded, but optimistically decides she might find a use for it as a flowerpot. Looking inside she discovers it is full of gold pieces, and decides to drag it home in her shawl. She drags it for a while, but when she looks back, the pot has become a lump of silver. She decides this is better than gold, as it is less likely to be stolen, and goes on. After a time she turns back again, to find the silver has turned into a chunk of iron. She observes this will be easier to sell, and that the penny pieces it will bring would be safer than either gold or silver. She goes on again, and when she turns back a third time, the iron has become a rock. She exclaims how convenient this will be as a doorstop, and happily goes home.

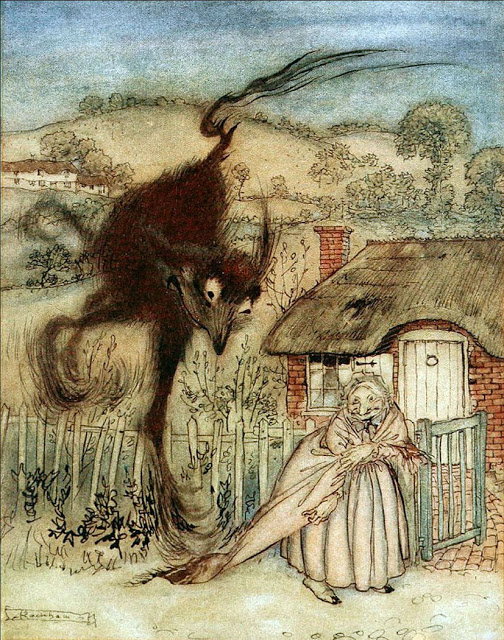

When she reaches her home, the rock transforms again, revealing itself to be the Hedley Kow, a mischievous shapeshifting creature. The creature trots off laughing, leaving the woman staring after it. She proclaims that it was quite a thing to have seen the Hedley Kow for herself, and goes inside to think about her good luck.

== Commentary ==
The Hedley Kow was a kind of elf noted for its mischievous habits of shapeshifting. Similar creatures include the Brag, also from Northumberland, and the Dutch Kludde and Oschaert. However, the old woman's equanimity in face of the creature's changes distinguishes this tale.

The German fairy tale "Hans in Luck" has a similar sequence in which the character believes that every change is for the better. The Hedley Kow is likewise catalogued under ATU 1415 Lucky Hans.
