= Dunnie =

Character in Anglo-Scottish folklore

A Dunnie is a small Brownie-like being in the folklore of the Anglo-Scottish borders, specifically Northumberland, the most famous being that of the Hazlerigg Dunnie of Hazlerigg in the parish of Chatton, Northumberland. The Dunnie has been known to take the form of a horse in order to trick a rider into mounting him before disappearing and leaving them in the muddiest part of the road. He also is said to disguise as plough-horses only to vanish when the ploughman takes him into the stalls.

The Dunnie was also said to wander the crags and dales of the Cheviots singing:

"Cockenheugh there's gear enough,
Collierheugh there's mair,
For I've lost the key o' the Bounders, (or "It is also "I've lost the key o' the Bowden-door.")
An' I'm ruined for evermair."

The Dunnie is thus thought to be a ghost of a reiver who hoarded his loot in the fells and guards his ill-gotten gains to this day.

In full the song of the dunnie goes:

"Cockenheugh there's gear enough,
Collierheugh there's mair,
For I've lost the key o' the Bounders"

"Ross for rabbits, and Elwick for kail,
Of a' the' towns e'er I saw Howick for ale:
Howick for ale, and Kyloe for scrubbers,
Of a' the towns e'er I saw Lowick for robbers;-
Lowick for robbers, Buckton for breed,
Of a' the towns e'er I saw Holy Island for need;-
Holy Island for need, and Grindon for kye,
Of a' the towns e'er I saw Doddington for rye:-
Doddington for rye, Bowisdon for rigs,
Of a' the towns e'er I saw Barmoor for whigs:-
Barmour for whigs, Tweedmouth for doors,
Of a' the towns e'er I saw Ancroft for whores:-
Ancroft for whores, and Spittal for fishers,
Of a' the towns e'er I saw Berrington for dishes."
