= Grindylow =

Water spirit in English folklore

In English folklore, Grindylow or Grundylow is a creature in the counties of Yorkshire and Lancashire. The name is thought to be connected to Grendel, a name or term used in Beowulf and in many Old English charters where it is seen in connection with meres, bogs and lakes.

Grindylows are supernatural creatures that appear in the folklore of England, most notably the Lancaster area. They are described as diminutive humanoids with scaly skin, a greenish complexion, sharp claws and teeth, and long, wiry arms with lengthy fingers at the end. They are said to dwell in ponds and marshes waiting for unsuspecting children, which they grab with their shockingly strong grip, and then drag under the surface of the waters.

Grindylows have been used as shadowy figures to frighten children away from pools, marshes, or ponds where they could drown.

Peg Powler, Nelly Longarms, and Jenny Greenteeth are similar water spirits.

== See also ==
- Borda (legendary creature)
- Kappa (folklore)
- Vodyanoy
