= Shellycoat =

Mythical bogeyman

In Scottish and Northern English folklore, a shellycoat (also called spellycoat) is a prankster water spirit that haunts rivers and streams. They are mainly described on the east coast of Scotland.

== Description ==
The shellycoat is said to have long hair all over its body, along with webbed feet. The hair is covered in shells and other ocean debris, making a clattering sound as it moves. They are similar to a tangie, which is covered in seaweed.

Shellycoats are considered to be relatively harmless compared to other water spirits like the kelpie. They may mislead wanderers, particularly those they think are trespassing upon the creature's territory, but without malice. A common tactic of a shellycoat would be to cry out as if drowning and then laugh like a horse at the distracted victim. If they are disrespected shellycoats may physically fight the offending party, a trait that they share with urisks and glaistig. It is believed that the shellycoat cannot cross running water and that it leaves women with children alone.

=== Shellycoat of Leith ===
The shellycoat of Leith was described as a large, evil spirit that was capable of flight. He would hide his magic coat of shells under a rock when not wearing it, during which times he was harmless. Young boys in Leith would sometimes run thrice around the rock he was said to haunt while chanting the following rhyme:

Shellycoat, shellycoat, gang awa hame (Note: go away home)
I cry na'yer mercy, I fear na'yer name

The shellycoat of Leith has been called more violent and dangerous than other shellycoats, with one story saying that he once played with a man until he dropped dead. Another story tells of a man named English Dick, who tried to challenge the shellycoat. His friends found him by the rock hours later with his legs broken, and he told them that the shellycoat had grabbed him and flown him to Inchkeith and thrown him against the rocks several times before bringing him back.

The shellycoat's rock was destroyed during dock construction in the early 1900s.

== Academic study ==
Jacob Grimm stated in his Deutsche Mythologie that the Scottish goblin Shellycoat is one and the same as the German Schellenrock, that is bell-coat:

A pück [home-sprite] served the monks of a Mecklenburg monastery for thirty years, in kitchen, stall and elsewhere; he was thoroughly good-natured, and only bargained for 'tunicam de diversis coloribus, et tintinnabulis plenam.' [a "parti-coloured coat with tinkling bells"] In Scotland there lived a goblin Shellycoat, and we saw (p. 465) that the dwarfs of the Mid. Ages also loved bells [schellen; and schellenkappe is Germ. for cap and bells]. The bells on the dress of a fool still attest his affinity to the shrewd and merry goblin (fol, follet); see Suppl.

Thomas Keightley quotes Grimm and classifies the shellycoat as a type of brownie:

Another name by which the domestic spirit was known in some parts of Scotland was Shellycoat, of which the origin is uncertain.

== Bibliography ==
- Burns Chronicle and Club Directory. Burns Federation. 1988.
- The Twentieth Century. Nineteenth Century and After. 1927.
- Bassett, Fletcher S. (1885). Legends and Superstitions of the Sea and of Sailors in All Lands and at All Times. S. Low, Marston, Searle, & Rivington.
- Brand, John; Ellis, Henry; Hazlitt, William Carew (1905). Brand's Popular Antiquities of Great Britain: Faiths and Folklore; a Dictionary of National Beliefs, Superstitions and Popular Customs, Past and Current, with Their Classical and Foreign Analogues, Described and Illustrated. Reeves and Turner.
- Briggs, Katharine Mary (2002). The Fairies in Tradition and Literature. Psychology Press. ISBN 978-0-415-28601-5.
- Grimm, Jacob. Deutsche Mythologie. Vollständige Ausgabe. Marix Verlag: Wiesbaden 2007, ISBN 978-3-86539-143-8. English version at Northvegr Grimm's Teutonic Mythology Translation Project. Available online at http://www.northvegr.org/lore/grimmst/017_14.php
- Keightley, Thomas. The Fairy Mythology: Illustrative of the Romance and Superstition of Various Countries. 1870. Available online at http://www.sacred-texts.com/neu/celt/tfm/tfm130.htm.
- Mackenzie, Donald (14 January 2013). Scottish Folk-Lore and Folk Life - Studies in Race, Culture and Tradition. Read Books Ltd. ISBN 978-1-4474-8270-3.
- Scott, Walter (1875). Poetical Works: Together with the Minstrelsey of the Scottish Border, with the Author's Introductions and Notes. World Publishing House.
- Watt, Francis (1912). The Book of Edinburg Anecdote. T.N. Foulis.
