= Jenny Greenteeth =

Creature from English folklore

Jenny Greenteeth a.k.a. Wicked Jenny, Ginny Greenteeth and Grinteeth is a figure in English folklore. A river-hag, similar to Peg Powler and derived from the grindylow, she would pull children or the elderly into the water and drown them. The name is also used to describe pondweed or duckweed, which can form a continuous mat over the surface of a small body of water, making it misleading and potentially treacherous, especially to unwary children. With this meaning the name is common around Liverpool and southwest Lancashire.

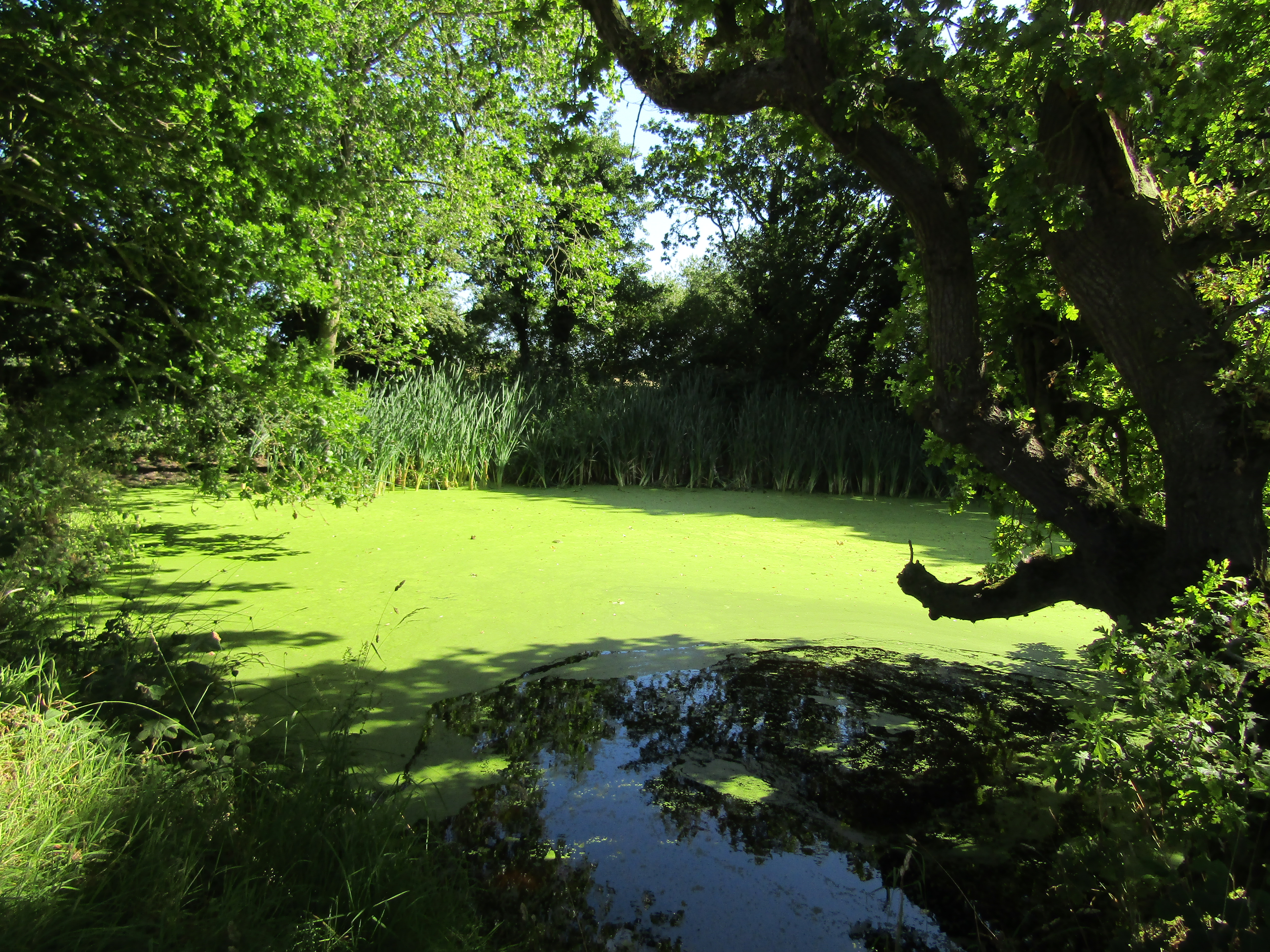
Duckweed half-covering a pond. Jenny Greenteeth is said to hide within such waters.

== Description and name ==
Jenny Greenteeth was often described as green-skinned, with long hair, and sharp teeth. She is called Jinny Greenteeth in Lancashire and north Staffordshire but in Cheshire and Shropshire she is called Wicked Jenny, Ginny Greenteeth or Jeannie Greenteeth. She is also described as lurking in the upper branches of trees at night, although this may be confusion with the northern English Jinny-hewlet, a folk name for an owl.

Her name is derived from that of the Grindylow which has the alternate name "Grendith" or "Grinteeth" which eventually developed into the term "Jenny Greenteeth".

== Similar folk figures around the world ==
She is likely to have been an invention to frighten children from dangerous waters, similar in nature to the Slavic Rusalka, the Kappa in Japanese mythology, or Australia's Bunyip. Some folklorists believe the tale recalls sacrificial practices.

The Qallupilluit is a being in Inuit mythology that lives along Arctic shorelines near ice floes and is said to steal children that wander too close to the water. This myth is believed to serve the purpose of protecting children from a dangerous environment, such as keeping them from playing on hazardous sea ice. Qallupilluit is often described as having green, slimy skin, long hair, and webbed hands like an aquatic creature with long fingernails, along with scales and fins. It wears an amautik, an Inuit parka mostly worn by women; some stories say that their parkas are made of Eider feathers and are used to carry away kidnapped children. It also has the ability to alter its appearance, through a technique known as pilutitaminik. While some interpretations include the pronoun 'he', the Qallupilluit is predominantly described in a feminine manner.

A similar figure in Jamaican folklore is called the River Mumma (River Mother). She is said to live at the fountainhead of large rivers in Jamaica sitting on top of a rock, combing her long black hair with a gold comb. She usually appears at midday and she disappears if she observes anyone approaching. However, if an intruder sees her first and their eyes meet, terrible things will happen to the intruder. A similar figure known as the Storm Hag (uncommonly also known as Jenny Greenteeth) appears in American folklore around Lake Erie, specifically in the urban legends of Erie, Pennsylvania, in which sailors use a paranormal being to explain the dangers and shipwrecks in the Erie Triangle. The Storm Hag is said to be a green skinned woman with teeth like a shark's but green, as well as piercing yellow eyes, who rests on the bottom of the Lake, off the coast of Presque Isle and sings a song whenever a ship approaches. When the sailors of the ship hear the song, the Storm Hag attacks the ship and crew with violent storms and waves, sinking and devouring them.

Come into the water, love,
Dance beneath the waves,
Where dwell the bones of sailor-lads
Inside my saffron cave.

— S. E. Schlosser, Spooky Pennsylvania

== In popular culture ==
Jenny Greenteeth inspired the lake monster Meg Mucklebones in the 1985 Ridley Scott fantasy film Legend.

Jenny Greenteeth is recalled by John Heath-Stubbs in his poem "The Green Man's Last Will and Testament", lamenting the eclipse of "the cruel nymphs/ Of the northern streams, Peg Powler of the Tees/ And Jenny Greenteeth of the Ribble".

In the novelette "Water Babies" by Simon Brown, Jenny Greenteeth is mentioned as being one of many names for a child-snatching water-demon. In the novella, an Australian police officer investigates a series of drownings that turn out to be predatory attacks by a seal-like creature.

Jenny Greenteeth appears in a number of Dungeons & Dragons (5th Edition) adventure modules, including: DDEX01-08 "Tales Trees Tell" (2014), DDAL04-01 "Suits of the Mist" (2016), DDAL04-06 "The Ghost" (2016), and DDAL04-14 "The Dark Lord" (2016).

She also appears in the story "Pretty Jennie Greenteeth" by Leife Shallcross, which won the 2016 Aurealis Award for best young adult short story.

The novel Greenteeth by Molly O'Neill is told from the perspective of Jenny Greenteeth, who leaves her home lake on a quest with a hobgoblin and an accused witch. In the context of the novel, Jenny Greenteeth is the name of both the individual character and the species of fairie creatures to which she belongs.

Jenny Greenteeth appears in the first chapter of Terry Pratchett's fantasy novel The Wee Free Men. The main character, a young witch named Tiffany Aching, briefly sees Jenny in a river. Jenny is described as having "a thin face with long sharp teeth, huge round eyes, and dripping green hair like waterweed."

She appears briefly in the Hellboy story The Corpse.

== See also ==
- Belisama
- Black Annis
- Circe
- Goldberry
- Grindylow
- Näkki
- Nelly Longarms
- Nimue
- Siren
