= Michael Aislabie Denham =

English merchant and collector of folklore

Michael Aislabie Denham (1801 – 10 September 1859) was an English merchant and collector of folklore.

== Life ==
A native of Gainford, County Durham, Denham was in business at Kingston-upon-Hull in the early part of his life. Ultimately he settled as a general merchant at Piercebridge, near Gainford, where he died on 10 September 1859.

== Works ==
Denham collected local lore. His works were:

- A Collection of Proverbs and Popular Sayings relating to the Seasons, the Weather, and Agricultural Pursuits, gathered chiefly from oral tradition, London, 1846, printed by the Percy Society.
- The Slogans, and War and Gathering Cries of the North of England, 1850, and with additions, Newcastle upon Tyne, 1851.
- A Collection of Bishoprick Rhymes, Proverbs, and Sayings, to which he afterwards added four tracts of the same kind, completing the last about 1858.
- Cumberland Rhymes, Proverbs, and Sayings, in four parts, the last of which appeared in 1854.
- A similar work relating to Westmorland, in two parts, 1858.
- Roman Imperial Gold Coin, a description of a coin of the Emperor Maximus [Durham (?) 1856], under the pseudonym "Archæus".
- Folklore of the North, in six parts, the last appearing in 1856.
- Folklore, or a Collection of Local Rhymes, Proverbs, Sayings, Prophecies, Slogans, &c., relating to Northumberland, Newcastle-on-Tyne, and Berwick-on-Tweed; Richmond, Yorkshire, 1858. Limited to fifty copies.
- Minor Tracts on Folklore, to the number of twenty, starting about 1849 and ending about 1854.
- A Classified Catalogue of the Antiquarian Tomes, Tracts, and Trifles, referring to the works Denham had edited himself, 1859.
