= Tolkien's modern sources =

Effect on Tolkien's legendarium

J. R. R. Tolkien derived the characters, stories, places, and languages of Middle-earth from many sources, including numerous modern works of fiction. These include adventure stories from Tolkien's childhood, such as books by John Buchan and H. Rider Haggard, especially the 1887 She: A History of Adventure. Tolkien stated that he used the fight with werewolves in Samuel Rutherford Crockett's 1899 historical fantasy The Black Douglas for his battle with wargs.

Tolkien appears to have made use, too, of early science fiction, such as H. G. Wells's subterranean Morlocks from the 1895 The Time Machine and Jules Verne's hidden runic message in his 1864 Journey to the Center of the Earth.

A major influence was the Arts and Crafts polymath William Morris. Tolkien wanted to imitate his prose and poetry romances such as the 1889 The House of the Wolfings, and read his 1870 translation of the Völsunga saga when he was a student. Further, as Marjorie Burns states, Tolkien's account of Bilbo Baggins and his party setting off into the wild on ponies resembles Morris's account of his travels in Iceland in several details.

Tolkien's other writings have been described by Anna Vaninskaya as fitting into the romantic Little Englandism and anti-statism of 20th century writers like George Orwell and G. K. Chesterton. His The Lord of the Rings was criticized by postwar literary figures like Edwin Muir and dismissed as non-modernist, but accepted by others such as Iris Murdoch.

== Context ==
J. R. R. Tolkien was a scholar of English literature, a philologist and medievalist interested in language and poetry from the Middle Ages, especially that of Anglo-Saxon England and Northern Europe. His professional knowledge of works such as Beowulf shaped his fictional world of Middle-earth, including his fantasy novel The Lord of the Rings. (Note: Carpenter 1981, #131 to Milton Waldman, late 1951) This did not prevent him from making use of modern sources as well; in the J.R.R. Tolkien Encyclopedia, Dale Nelson discusses 25 authors whose works are paralleled by elements in Tolkien's writings. Thomas Kullmann and Dirk Siepmann state that "the tradition Tolkien owes most to ... is nineteenth- and early twentieth-century novel-writing." Holly Ordway, in her book Tolkien's Modern Reading, lists over 200 books, by 149 authors, that Tolkien certainly "interacted with", having written about them, mentioned them in letters or interviews, taught from them, heard the work discussed, owned the work or an anthology containing part of it, gave a copy as a gift, or is reliably reported to have been familiar with the work.

== Adventure stories from Tolkien's childhood ==
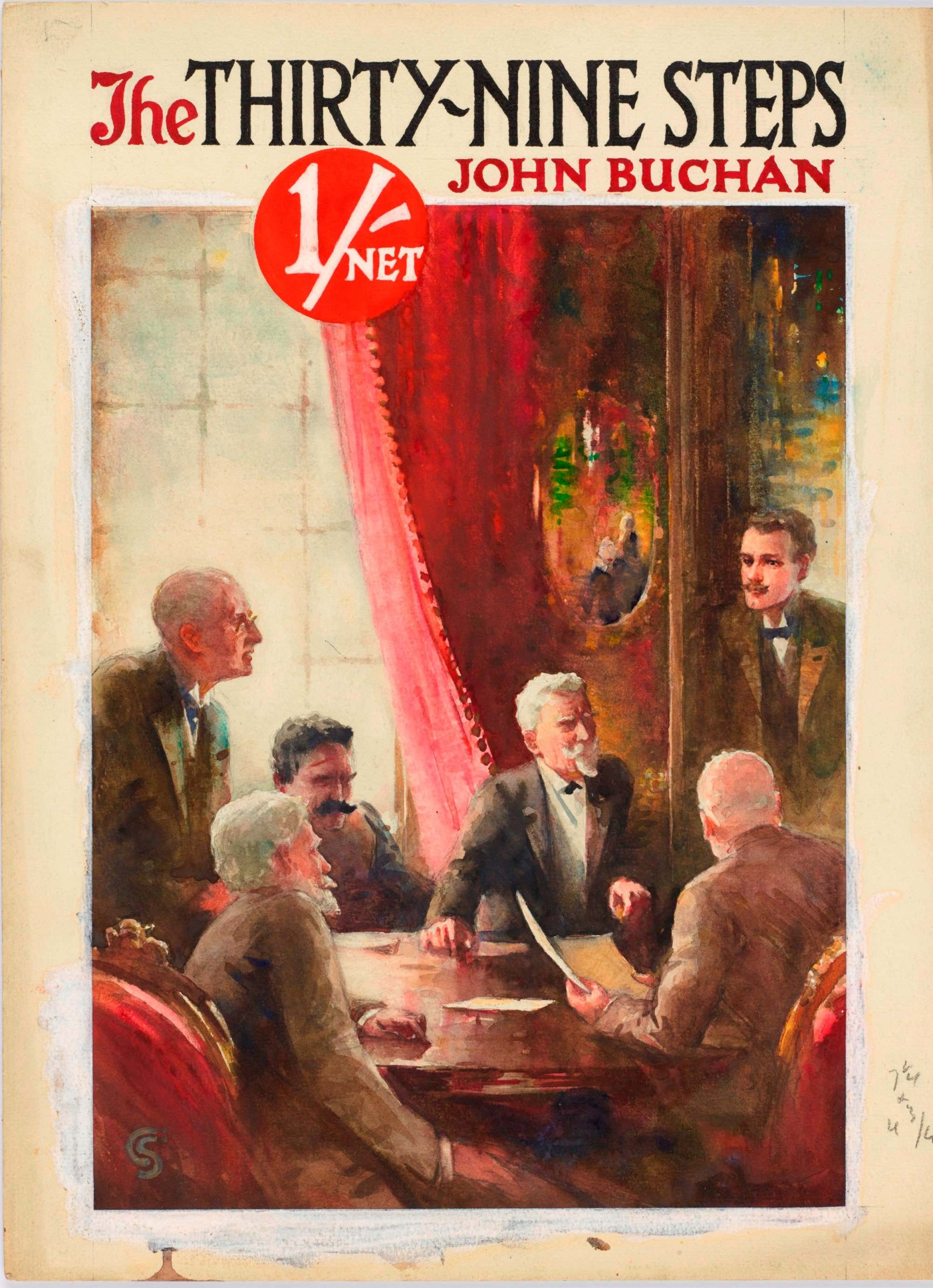
Tolkien said he enjoyed John Buchan's stories; scholars have compared his writings to Buchan's, such as his 1915 The Thirty-Nine Steps.

In the case of a few authors, such as John Buchan and H. Rider Haggard, it is known that Tolkien enjoyed their adventure stories. Tolkien stated that he "preferred the lighter contemporary novels", such as Buchan's. Critics have detailed resonances between the two authors. Nelson states that Tolkien responded rather directly to the "mythopoeic and straightforward adventure romance" in Haggard's novels. When interviewed in 1966, the only book Tolkien named as a favourite was Haggard's 1887 adventure novel She: "I suppose as a boy She interested me as much as anything—like the Greek shard of Amyntas [Amenartas], which was the kind of machine by which everything got moving." Scholars have commented, too, on the similarities between Tolkien's monstrous Gollum and the evil and ancient hag Gagool in Haggard's 1885 novel King Solomon's Mines. Tolkien wrote of being impressed as a boy by Samuel Rutherford Crockett's 1899 historical fantasy novel The Black Douglas and of using its fight with werewolves for the battle with the wargs in The Fellowship of the Ring. (Note: Carpenter 1981, Tolkien's footnote to letter 306 to Michael Tolkien, 1967-8) Jared Lobdell proposes that The Lord of the Rings is "an adventure story in the Edwardian mode", supporting this with multiple parallels.

== Science fiction, fantasy, and William Morris ==
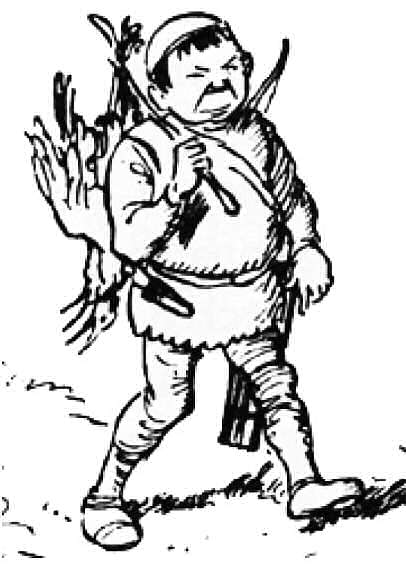
Edward Wyke-Smith's 1927 The Marvellous Land of Snergs influenced Tolkien's hobbits.

Tolkien read and made some use of modern fantasy, such as George MacDonald's The Princess and the Goblin. Edward Wyke-Smith's Marvellous Land of Snergs, with its "table-high" title characters, influenced the incidents, themes, and depiction of hobbits. Books by Tolkien's fellow-Inkling Owen Barfield contributed to his world-view of decline and fall, particularly the 1928 Poetic Diction.

H. G. Wells's description of the subterranean Morlocks in his 1895 science fiction novel The Time Machine are suggestive of Gollum. Parallels between The Hobbit and Jules Verne's Journey to the Center of the Earth include a hidden runic message and a celestial alignment that direct the adventurers to the goals of their quests. Tolkien acknowledged MacDonald's 1858 fantasy Phantastes as a source in a letter. He wrote that MacDonald's sentient trees had "perhaps some remote influence" on his tree-giant Ents. (Note: Tolkien, J. R. R. Letter to L.M. Cutts of 26 October 1958, Sotheby's English Literature, History, Fine Bindings, Private Press Books, Children's Books, Illustrated Books and Drawings 10 July 2003 (Auction Catalogue), Sotheby's.)

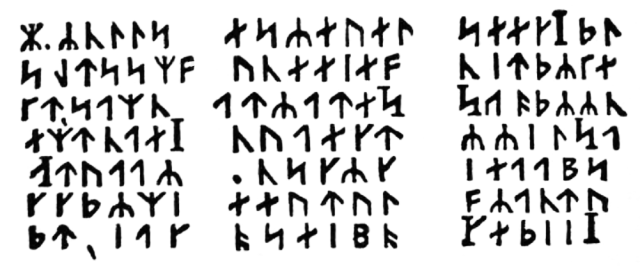
Jules Verne's runic cryptogram from his 1864 Journey to the Center of the Earth may have influenced Tolkien's Book of Mazarbul.

A major influence was the Arts and Crafts polymath William Morris. Tolkien wished to imitate the style and content of Morris's medievalising prose and poetry romances such as the 1889 The House of the Wolfings, (Note: Carpenter 1981, #1 to Edith Bratt, October 1914) and made use of placenames such as the Dead Marshes (Note: Carpenter 1981, #226 to L. W. Forster, December 1960) and Mirkwood. (Note: Tolkien 1937, p. 183, note 10) Tolkien read Morris's 1870 translation of the Völsunga saga when he was a student, introducing him to Norse mythology. The medievalist Marjorie Burns writes that Bilbo Baggins's character and adventures in The Hobbit match Morris's account of his travels in Iceland in the early 1870s in numerous details. Like Bilbo's, Morris's party set off enjoyably into the wild on ponies. He meets a "boisterous" Beorn-like man called "Biorn the boaster" who lives in a hall beside Eyja-fell, and who tells Morris, tapping him on the belly, "... besides, you know you are so fat", just as Beorn pokes Bilbo "most disrespectfully" and compares him to a plump rabbit. Burns notes that Morris was "relatively short, a little rotund, and affectionately called 'Topsy', for his curly mop of hair", all somewhat Hobbit-like characteristics. Further, she writes, "Morris in Iceland often chooses to place himself in a comic light and to exaggerate his own ineptitude", just as Morris's companion, the painter Edward Burne-Jones, gently teased his friend by depicting him as very fat in his Iceland cartoons. Burns suggests that these images "make excellent models" for the Bilbo who runs puffing to the Green Dragon inn or "jogs along behind Gandalf and the dwarves" on his quest. Another definite resemblance is the emphasis on home comforts: Morris enjoyed a pipe, a bath, and "regular, well-cooked meals"; Morris looked as out of place in Iceland as Bilbo did "over the Edge of the Wild"; both are afraid of dark caves; and both grow through their adventures.

In the 20th century, Lord Dunsany wrote fantasy novels and short stories that Tolkien read, without agreeing with Dunsany's irony, skepticism, or the use of dreams to explain fantasy away. Further, Tolkien found Dunsany's creation of names inconsistent and unconvincing; Tolkien wrote that Middle-earth names were "coherent and consistent and made upon two related linguistic formulae [i.e. Quenya and Sindarin], so that they achieve a reality not fully achieved ... by other name-inventors (say Swift or Dunsany!)." (Note: Carpenter 1981, #19 to Stanley Unwin, 16 December 1937) The fantasy author E. R. Eddison was influenced by Dunsany. (Note: Eddison was an occasional member of the Inklings literary group, to which Tolkien and Lewis belonged.) His most famous work is the 1922 The Worm Ouroboros. Tolkien had met Eddison and had read The Worm Ouroboros, praising it in print, but commenting in a letter that he disliked Eddison's philosophy, cruelty, and choice of names. (Note: Carpenter 1981, #199 to Caroline Everett, 24 June 1957)

Tolkien stated that he derived the phrase "crack of doom" from an unnamed story by Algernon Blackwood. Holly Ordway identifies this as his 1909 novel The Education of Uncle Paul, where the children tell him of the "crack between Yesterday and To-morrow", and that "if we're very quick, we can find the crack and slip through... And, once inside there, there's no time, of course... Anything may happen, and everything come true." Ordway comments that this would have attracted Tolkien because of his interest in travelling back in time.

David Lindsay's 1920 science fiction and fantasy novel A Voyage to Arcturus was a central influence on C. S. Lewis's Space Trilogy, and through him on Tolkien. Tolkien said he read the book "with avidity", finding it "more powerful and more mythical" than Lewis's 1938 Out of the Silent Planet, but less of a story. (Note: Carpenter 1981, #26 to Stanley Unwin, 4 March 1938) On the other hand, Tolkien did not approve of the framing device that Lindsay had used, namely anti-gravity rays and a crystal torpedo ship; in his unfinished novel The Notion Club Papers, Tolkien makes one of the protagonists, Guildford, criticise those kinds of "contraptions".

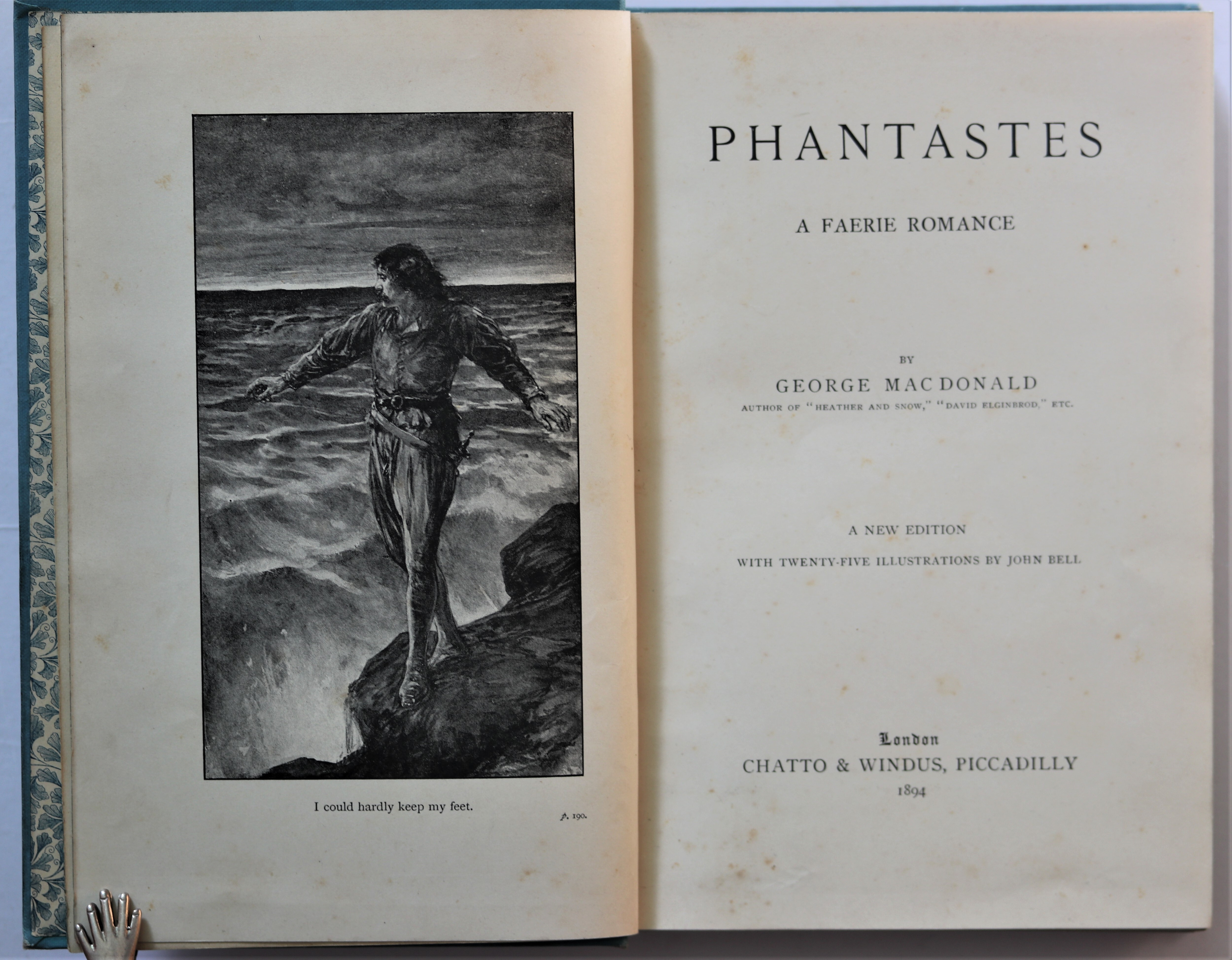
Frontispiece and title page of George MacDonald's 1858 Phantastes, illustrated by John Bell. The novel was one of the first fantasies for adults.

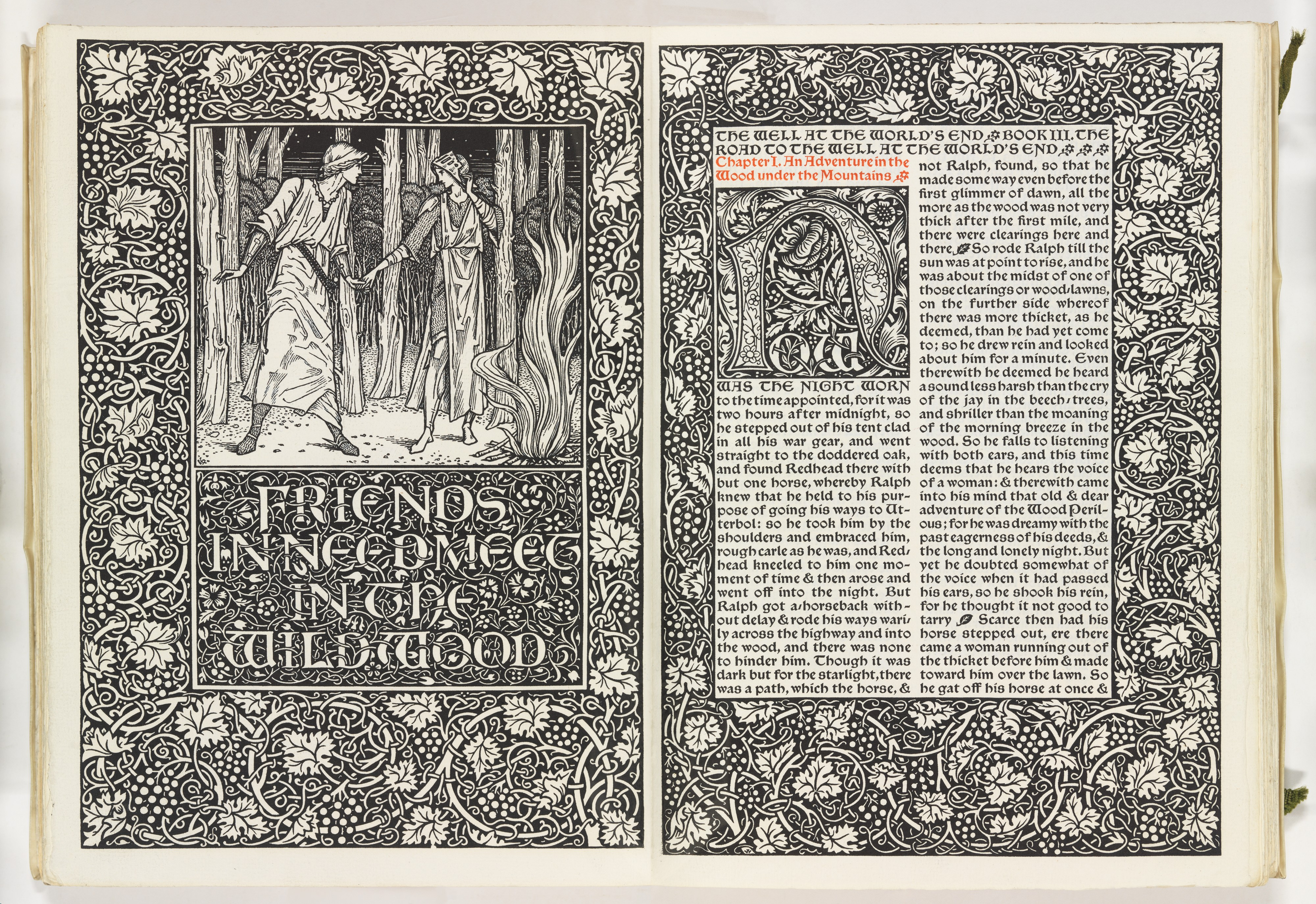
A double-page spread in archaic style in William Morris's 1896 novel The Well at the World's End, illustrated with woodcuts on vellum by his friend Edward Burne-Jones

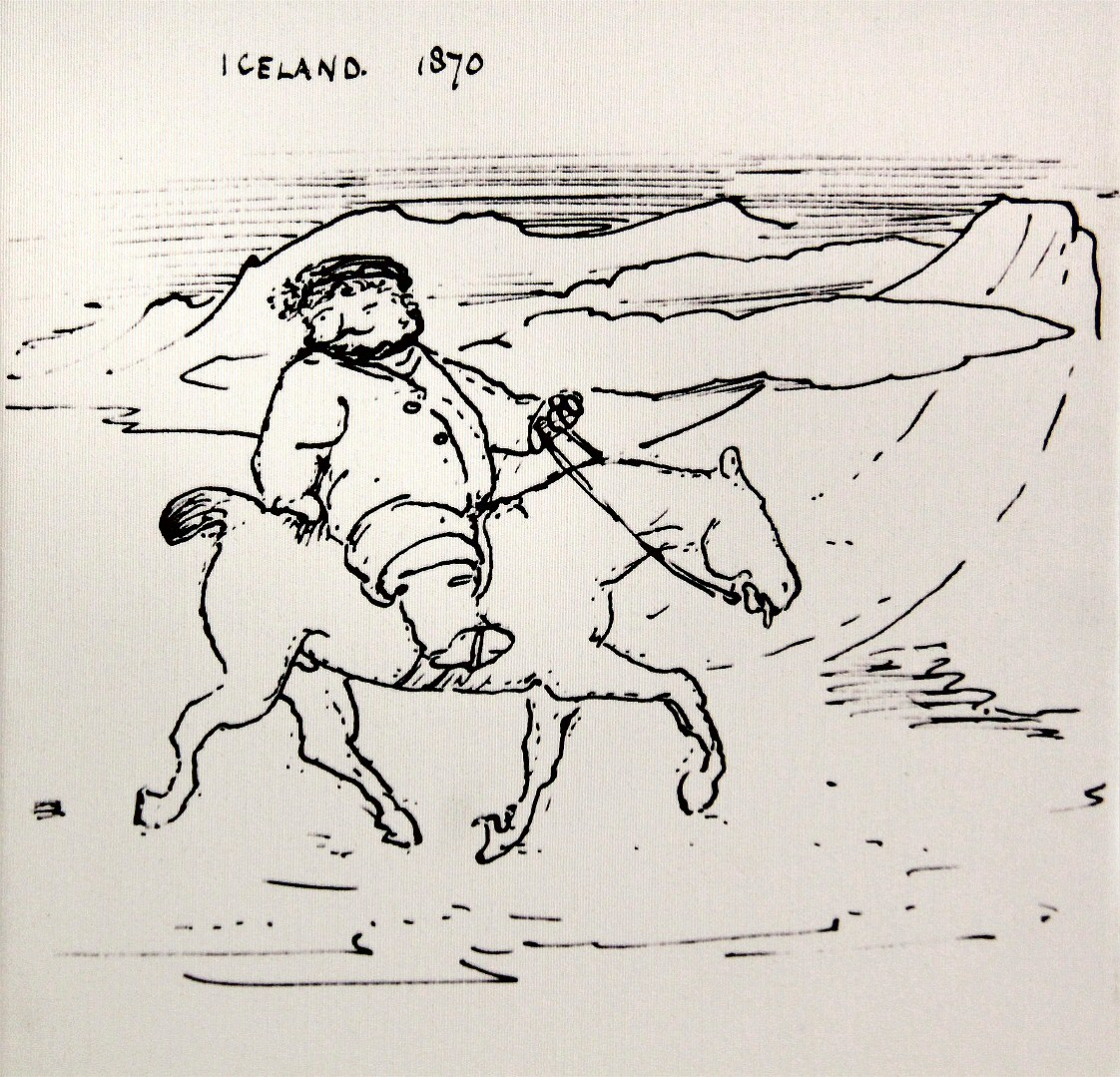
Bilbo's character and adventures match many details of William Morris's expedition in Iceland. Cartoon of Morris riding a pony by his travelling companion Edward Burne-Jones (1870)

== English literary traditions ==
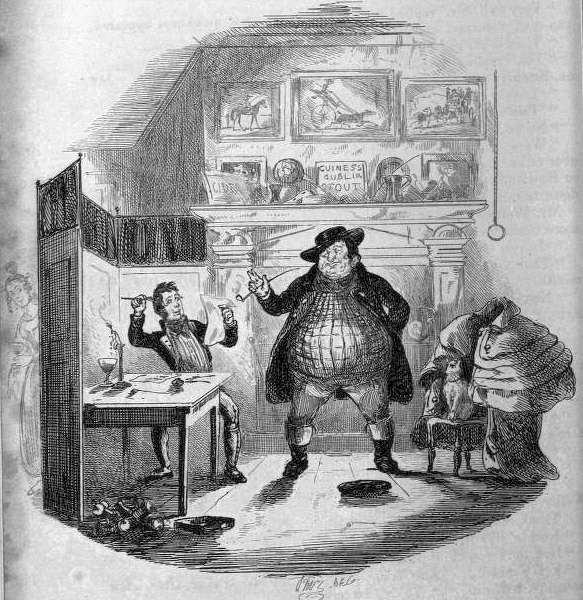
Englishmen smoking pipes: Illustration by Hablot Knight Browne for Charles Dickens' 1837 The Pickwick Papers

Charles Dickens' 1837 novel The Pickwick Papers has likewise been shown to have reflections in Tolkien. Michael Martinez, writing for The Tolkien Society, finds "similar dialogue styles and character qualities" in Dickens and Tolkien, and "moments that elicit the same emotional resonance". Martinez gives as examples the likeness of the Fellowship of the Ring's group of nine to Pickwick's group of friends, and of Bilbo's speech at his birthday party to Pickwick's first speech to his group.

The scholar of English literature Anna Vaninskaya argues that the form and themes of Tolkien's early writings fit into the romantic tradition of writers like Morris and W. B. Yeats. In terms of politics, she compares Tolkien's mature writings with the romantic Little Englandism and anti-statism of 20th century writers like George Orwell and G. K. Chesterton. Postwar literary figures such as Anthony Burgess, Edwin Muir and Philip Toynbee heavily criticized The Lord of the Rings, but others like the novelists Naomi Mitchison and Iris Murdoch respected the work, while the poet W. H. Auden championed it. Later critics have placed Tolkien closer to the modernist tradition with his emphasis on language and temporality, while his pastoral emphasis is shared with First World War poets and the Georgian movement. The Tolkien scholar Claire Buck suggests that if Tolkien was intending to create a new mythology for England, that would fit the tradition of English post-colonial literature and the many novelists and poets who reflected on the state of modern English society and the nature of Englishness. Ordway notes that Tolkien remained interested in Joseph Henry Shorthouse's "strange, long-forgotten" 1881 novel John Inglesant, and suggests that its "moral conflict and competing loyalties" and its "providentially freeing climax consequent upon the exercise of pity" are reflected in "perhaps the key theme" of The Lord of the Rings.

Thomas Kullmann and Dirk Siepmann state that aspects of Tolkien's prose style and language in The Lord of the Rings are comparable with that of nineteenth and twentieth century novelists, giving multiple examples.

Kullmann and Siepmann's comparison of Tolkien with modern novelists
The Lord of the Rings	Analogous novelists and novels	Similarities
Limited point of view	Horace Walpole's The Castle of Otranto; Jane Austen's Pride and Prejudice; Joseph Conrad	Reader often gets one character's "perceptions, thoughts, and feelings"
Landscape descriptions	Bronte sisters Thomas Hardy	Landscapes "accompany, illustrate, and provide comments on the protagonist's experience"
Characterisation by non-standard speech	Emily Brontë's Wuthering Heights; Charles Dickens's David Copperfield	e.g. Sam Gamgee, Gollum
Use of ancient mythology	James Joyce's Ulysses	Both create "intense dialogue" with myths, achieving literary effect by involving the reader; Joyce with allusion and quotation, Tolkien by emulating style and content

== See also ==
- Shakespeare's influence on Tolkien
- Tolkien and the Celtic
- Tolkien and the classical world
- Tolkien and the medieval
- Tolkien and the Norse
- Tolkien's impact on fantasy

== Sources ==
- Carpenter, Humphrey, ed. (1981). The Letters of J. R. R. Tolkien. Houghton Mifflin. ISBN 978-0-395-31555-2.
- Carpenter, Humphrey (1978) [1977]. J. R. R. Tolkien: A Biography. Unwin Paperbacks. ISBN 978-0-04928-039-7.
- De Camp, Lyon Sprague (1976). Literary Swordsmen and Sorcerers. Arkham House. ISBN 978-0-87054-076-9.
- Flieger, Verlyn (1983). Splintered Light: Logos and Language in Tolkien's World. Wm. B. Eerdmans. ISBN 0-8028-1955-9.
- Hooker, Mark T. (2006). Tolkienian Mathomium: A Collection of Articles on J. R. R. Tolkien and his Legendarium. Llyfrawr. ISBN 978-1-4382-4631-4.
- Hooker, Mark T. (2011). "Reading John Buchan in Search of Tolkien". In Fisher, Jason (ed.). Tolkien and the Study of his Sources: Critical Essays. McFarland. ISBN 978-0-7864-6482-1. OCLC 731009810.
- Hooker, Mark T. (2014). The Tolkienaeum: Essays on J.R.R. Tolkien and his Legendarium. Llyfrawr. ISBN 978-1-49975-910-5.
- Kullmann, Thomas; Siepmann, Dirk (2021). Tolkien as a Literary Artist. Cham: Palgrave Macmillan. ISBN 978-3-030-69298-8.
- Lee, Stuart D., ed. (2020) [2014]. A Companion to J. R. R. Tolkien. Wiley Blackwell. ISBN 978-1-119-65602-9.
- Lobdell, Jared C. (2004). The World of the Rings: Language, Religion, and Adventure in Tolkien. Open Court. ISBN 978-0-8126-9569-4.
- Moorcock, Michael; Miéville, China; VanderMeer, Jeff (1 January 2004). Wizardry & Wild Romance. MonkeyBrain Books. ISBN 978-1-932265-07-1.
- Ordway, Holly (2021). Tolkien's Modern Reading: Middle-earth Beyond the Middle Ages. Word on Fire. ISBN 978-1-9432-4372-3.
- Rogers, William N. II; Underwood, Michael R. (2000). "Gagool and Gollum: Exemplars of Degeneration in King Solomon's Mines and The Hobbit". In Sir George Clark (ed.). J. R. R. Tolkien and His Literary Resonances: Views of Middle-earth. Westport, Connecticut: Greenwood Publishing Group. pp. 121–132. ISBN 978-0-313-30845-1.
- Shippey, Tom (2005) [1982]. The Road to Middle-Earth (Third ed.). Grafton (HarperCollins). ISBN 978-0-261-10275-0.
- Tolkien, J. R. R. (1937). Douglas A. Anderson (ed.). The Annotated Hobbit. Boston: Houghton Mifflin (published 2002). ISBN 978-0-618-13470-0.
