= 1881 in the United Kingdom =

Events from the year 1881 in the United Kingdom.

== Incumbents ==
- Monarch – Victoria
- Prime Minister – William Ewart Gladstone (Liberal)

== Events ==
- 1 January – postal orders issued for the first time in Britain.
- 14 January – Fenian dynamite campaign in Britain begins: A bomb explodes at a military barracks in Salford, Lancashire; a young boy is killed.
- 17–18 January – blizzard over southern parts of Britain.
- 18 January – First Boer War: British forces defeated at the Battle of Laing's Nek.
- 8 February – First Boer War: British forces defeated at the Battle of Schuinshoogte.
- 27 February – First Boer War: British forces defeated at the Battle of Majuba Hill.
- 1 March – the Cunard Line's SS Servia, the first steel transatlantic liner, is launched at Clydebank.
- 12 March – Andrew Watson of Glasgow's Queen's Park F.C. (from a mixed Scottish/British Guianese background) captains the Scotland national football team in a 6–1 victory against England, becoming the world's first mixed race international Association football player.
- 27 March – in Basingstoke, antagonism between the Salvation Army and supporters of the licensed trade becomes so great that the Riot Act is read and troops are called in to restore order.
- 31 March – Edward Rudolf founds the 'Church of England Central Society for Providing Homes for Waifs and Strays' (later The Children's Society).
- 3 April – census in the United Kingdom. Two-thirds of the population are urbanised; one-seventh live in London.
- 5 April – the Treaty of Pretoria gives the Boers self-government in the Transvaal under a theoretical British oversight.
- 9 April – Old Carthusians F.C. beat Old Etonians 3–0 in the FA Cup Final at The Oval, the last time it will be played between two amateur sides.
- 18 April – the Natural History Museum is opened in London.
- 19 April – Robert Cecil, Marquess of Salisbury, becomes the Conservative leader in the House of Lords following the death of Benjamin Disraeli.
- 23 April – first performance of the Gilbert and Sullivan opera Patience, a satire on aestheticism, at the Opera Comique in London.
- 27 April – British troops leave Afghanistan.
- 1 May – Childers Reforms of the British Army begin to reorganise the infantry into multi-battalion regiments, coming into effect on 1 July with the issue of General Order 70.
- 7 June – the Democratic Federation, predecessor of the Social Democratic Federation, established as Britain's first organised socialist political party by Henry Hyndman, holds its first meeting.
- 14–20 July – International Anarchist Congress held in London.
- 26 July – first publication of the London Evening News.
- 16 August – a tribunal is set up under the Land Law (Ireland) Act 1881 to examine excessive rents.
- 27 August – the Sunday Closing (Wales) Act prohibits the sale of alcohol in Wales on a Sunday. This is the first act of Parliament of the United Kingdom, Great Britain or England since the 1542 Act of Union between England and Wales whose application is restricted to Wales.
- 26 September – Godalming becomes the first town in England to have its streets illuminated by electric light (hydroelectrically generated).
- 10 October – Richard D'Oyly Carte's Savoy Theatre opens in London, the world's first public building to be fully lit by electricity, using Joseph Swan's incandescent light bulbs. The run of Patience transfers from the Opera Comique. The stage is first lit electrically on 28 December.
- 13 October – Charles Stewart Parnell imprisoned for to his part in land agitation in Ireland.
- 14 October – great gale across the country; in the Eyemouth disaster ("Black Friday"), a severe storm strikes the Berwickshire coast of Scotland and 189 fishermen die.
- 16 October – The People Sunday newspaper founded.
- 22 October – Tit-Bits weekly digest magazine founded by George Newnes.

== Publications ==
- Henry James' novel The Portrait of a Lady.
- Talbot Baines Reed's school story The Fifth Form at St. Dominic's begins serialisation in The Boy's Own Paper.
- Dante Gabriel Rossetti's Ballads and Sonnets.
- Joseph Henry Shorthouse's novel John Inglesant.
- Robert Louis Stevenson's children's adventure novel Treasure Island begins serialization in Young Folks (1 October) as by "Captain George North".
- New Testament in the Revised Version of The Bible.

== In fiction ==
- Sherlock Holmes and Dr John H. Watson first meet at Bart's Hospital, London, prior to the events narrated in Conan Doyle's A Study in Scarlet (1887) commencing on 4 March.

== Births ==
- 9 January – Lascelles Abercrombie, poet and critic (died 1938)
- 28 January – Ruby M. Ayres, romance novelist (died 1955)
- 13 February – Eleanor Farjeon, author of children's literature (died 1965)
- 21 February – Kenneth J. Alford, soldier and composer (died 1945)
- 9 March – Ernest Bevin, labour leader, politician and statesman (died 1951)
- 10 March – Thomas Quinlan, operatic impresario (died 1951)
- 25 March – Mary Webb, novelist (died 1927)
- 8 April – Ellen Bird, Titanic survivor (died 1949)
- 25 June – Robert Vansittart, diplomat (died 1957)
- 1 August – Rose Macaulay, novelist (died 1958)
- 2 August – Ethel M. Dell, romantic fiction writer (died 1939)
- 6 August – Alexander Fleming, bacteriological researcher, recipient of the Nobel Prize in Physiology or Medicine (died 1955)
- 19 August – Kingsley Wood, politician (died 1943)
- 20 August – Edgar Guest, poet (died 1959)
- 5 September – Victor Grayson, socialist politician (disappeared 1920)
- 12 September – Daniel Jones, phonetician (died 1967)
- 16 September – Clive Bell, art critic (died 1964)
- 17 September – Alfred Carpenter, naval officer, recipient of the Victoria Cross (died 1955)
- 11 October – Lewis Fry Richardson, mathematical physicist (died 1953)
- 15 October
  - William Temple, Archbishop of Canterbury (died 1944)
  - P. G. Wodehouse, comic writer (died 1975)

== Deaths ==
- 24 January
  - Frances Stackhouse Acton, antiquarian and botanist (born 1794)
  - James Collinson, Pre-Raphaelite painter (born 1825)
- 5 February – Thomas Carlyle, writer and historian (born 1795)
- 19 April – Benjamin Disraeli, Prime Minister of the United Kingdom (born 1804) (subsequently commemorated as Primrose Day)
- 24 May – Samuel Palmer, watercolour landscape painter (born 1805)
- 30 July – George Meads, cricketer (born 1797)
- 11 August – Jane Digby, adventurer (born 1807)
- 14 December – Decimus Burton, architect and garden designer (born 1800)
- 18 December – George Edmund Street, architect (born 1824)
