= E. V. Lucas =

English writer (1868–1938)

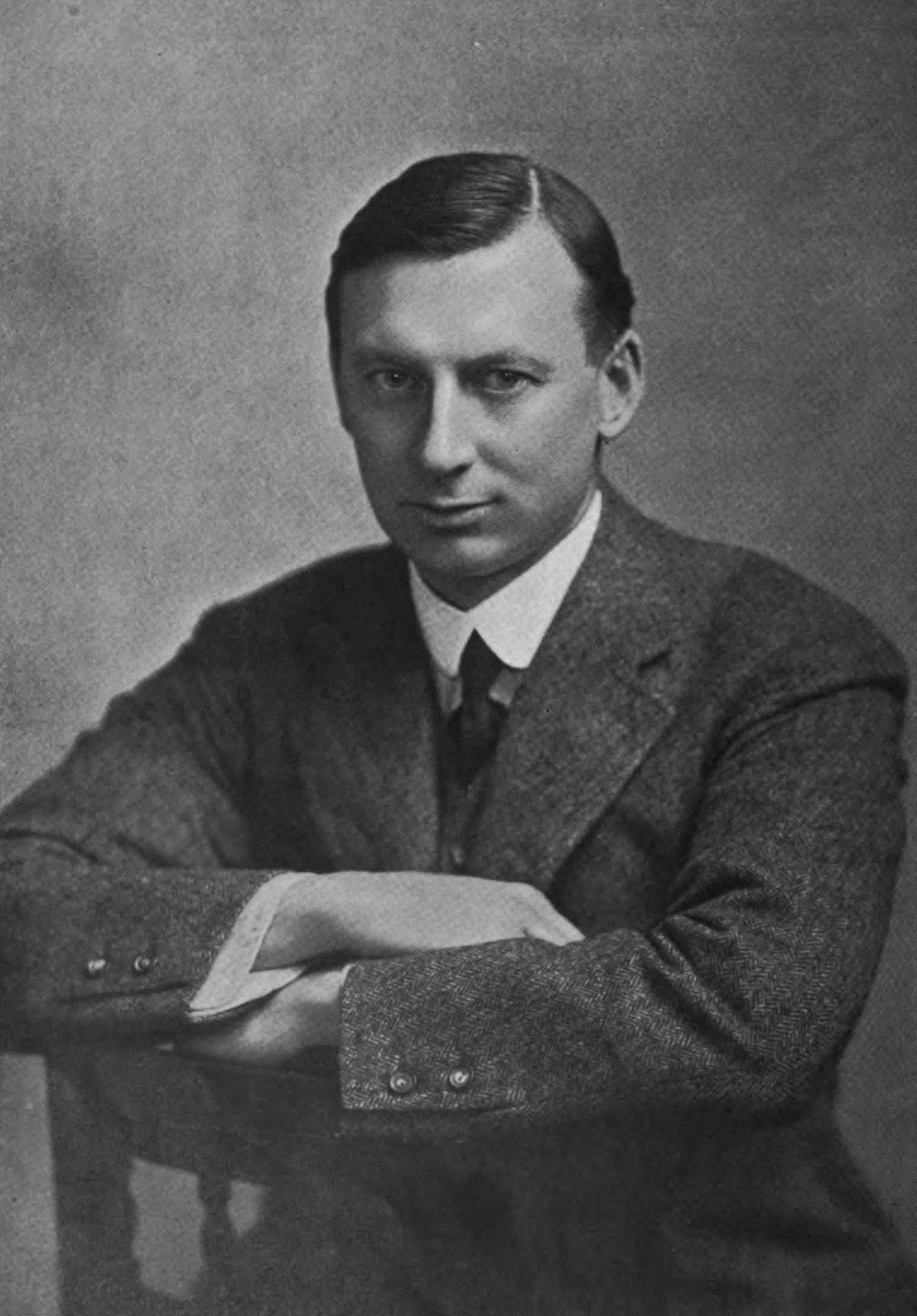
E.V. Lucas

Edward Verrall Lucas (11/12 June 1868 – 26 June 1938) was an English humorist, essayist, playwright, biographer, publisher, poet, novelist, short story writer and editor.

Born to a Quaker family in Eltham, on the fringes of London, Lucas began work at the age of sixteen, apprenticed to a bookseller. After that he turned to journalism, and worked on a local paper in Brighton and then on a London evening paper. He was commissioned to write a biography of Bernard Barton, the Quaker poet. This led to further commissions, including the editing of the works of Charles Lamb.

Lucas joined the staff of the humorous magazine Punch in 1904, and remained there for the rest of his life. He was a prolific writer, most celebrated for his short essays, but he also produced verses, novels and plays.

From 1908 to 1924 Lucas combined his work as a writer with that of publisher's reader for Methuen and Co. In 1924 he was appointed chairman of the company.

== Life and career ==
=== Early years and marriage ===
Lucas was born in Eltham, Kent, the second son of the four sons and three daughters of Alfred Lucas and his wife, Jane née Drewett. The Lucases were a Quaker family, and the young Lucas was educated at Friends School in Saffron Walden. His father's "laxity in financial matters" prevented Lucas from going to a university, and at the age of sixteen he was apprenticed to a Brighton bookseller.

In 1889 Lucas joined the staff of the Sussex Daily News. The following year he published, anonymously, his first volume of poems, Sparks from a Flint. With financial help from an uncle he moved to London to attend lectures at University College, after which he joined the staff of The Globe, one of London's evening papers. His duties there allowed him a great deal of spare time, and he read extensively in the Reading Room of the British Museum.

In 1897 he married (Florence) Elizabeth Gertrude, daughter of Colonel James Theodore Griffin, of the United States army; there was one child of the marriage, Audrey Lucas, who became an actor, playwright and novelist. Elizabeth Lucas was a writer, and husband and wife collaborated on several children's books.

=== Career ===
Lucas's Quaker background led to a commission from the Society of Friends for a biography of Bernard Barton, the Quaker poet and friend of Charles Lamb. The success of the book was followed by further commissions from leading publishers; the most important of these commissions was a new edition of Lamb's works, which eventually amounted to seven volumes, with an associated biography, all published between 1903 and 1905. His biographer Katharine Chubbuck writes, "These works established him as a critic, and his Life of Charles Lamb (1905) is considered seminal." In 1904, while in the middle of his work on Lamb, he joined the staff of Punch, remaining there for more than thirty years. Lucas introduced his Punch colleague A A Milne to the illustrator E H Shepard with whom Milne collaborated on two collections of verse and the two Winnie-the-Pooh books.

Lucas was prolific; by Max Beerbohm's estimation he spoke fewer words than he wrote. Lucas's Punch colleague E V Knox commented, "Lucas's publications include many anthologies and about thirty collections of light essays, on almost any subject that took his fancy, and some of the titles which he gave to them, Listener's Lure (1905), One Day and Another (1909), Old Lamps for New (1911), Loiterer's Harvest (1913), Cloud and Silver (1916), A Rover I Would Be (1928), indicate sufficiently the lightness, gaiety, and variety of their contents." He wrote travel books, parodies, and books about painters. Of the last he said, "I know very little about pictures, but I like to write about them for the benefit of those who know less." In 1910 Lucas wrote the short article on Jane Austen in the 11th edition of the Encyclopædia Britannica.

Before the First World War, Lucas was for a while interested in the theatre. His play The Visit of the King was produced at the Palace Theatre in 1912, but was not well received.[10]

Lucas was athletic and enjoyed billiards as well as cricket. He was a member of J. M. Barrie's team the "Allahakbarries", along with Henry Herbert La Thangue and Arthur Conan Doyle. Rupert Hart-Davis collected and published a collection of Lucas's essays, Cricket All His Life, which John Arlott called "the best written of all books on cricket".

Lucas had a long association with the publishing house Methuen and Co, which published his edition of Lamb. From 1908 to 1924 he was a reader for the firm; in 1924 he was appointed its chairman, a post he occupied with considerable success.

=== Later years ===
Lucas received honorary degrees from the Universities of St Andrews and Oxford, and was appointed Member of the Order of the Companions of Honour in 1932. He was appointed a member of the Royal Commission on the Historical Monuments of England in 1928, and from 1933 until his death he was a member of the Crown Lands Advisory Committee.

In his later years Lucas cut his domestic ties and lived alone, spending his evenings in restaurants and clubs, and developing a wide collection of pornography. He was a member of the Athenæum, Beefsteak, Buck's and the Garrick. When he was stricken with his final illness he steadfastly refused to allow his friends into his sickroom.

Lucas died in a nursing home in Marylebone, London, at the age of 70.

== Reception and legacy ==
Frank Swinnerton wrote of him:

Lucas had a great appetite for the curious, the human, and the ridiculous. If he were offered a story, an incident or an absurdity, his mind instantly shaped it with wit and form. He read a character with wisdom, and gravely turned it to fun. He versified a fancy, or concentrated in an anecdote or instance all that a vaguer mind might stagger for an hour to express. But his was the mind of a critic and a commentator; and the hideous sustained labour of the ambitious novelist was impossible to him.

Lucas's fluency was thought by some to dilute his skill. Although Swinnerton declared Lucas's essays "among the most agreeable of our age", Agnes Irene Smith wrote in The Sewanee Review of Lucas that despite his huge output "he seems to have left no finger prints. Eminently readable, he is read without being remembered; unusually quotable, he was never quoted much and seems never to be quoted any more."

His study of Highways and Byways in Sussex continues to influence postmodern explorations of the local; while his 1932 memoirs Reading, Writing and Remembering retained their interest longer than most of his other essays.

== Works ==
- The Face on the Wall
- Sparks from a Flint: Odd Rhymes for Odd Times (1891) As "E. V. L."
- Songs of the Bat (1892)
- Bernard Barton and his friends: a record of quiet lives (1893)
- A Book of Verse for Children (1897)
- The Flamp, the Ameliorator, and the Schoolboy's Apprentice (1897)
- All the World Over (1898), illustrated by Edith Farmiloe
- The War of the Wenuses (1898) with C. L. Graves (a parody of H. G. Wells's The War of the Worlds)
- Charles Lamb and the Lloyds (1898)
- Willow and Leather (1898), cricket essays
- The Open Road (1899), anthology
- The Book of Shops (1899)
- Four And Twenty Toilers (1900), poems
- What Shall We Do Now? (1900) with Elizabeth Lucas, games book
- Domesticities: A Little Book of Household Impressions (1900)
- The Visit to London (1902)
- Wisdom While You Wait (1903) with C. L. Graves, parody encyclopaedia
- England Day by Day (1903) with C. L. Graves
- Works and Letters of Charles and Mary Lamb (1903–05), editor
- Highways and Byways in Sussex (1904)
- The Life of Charles Lamb (1905), biography (revised editions 1907 and 1921)
- The Friendly Town (1905)
- A Wanderer in Holland (1905)
- A Wanderer in London (1906)
- Fireside and Sunshine (1906) Lucas, Edward Verrall (1907). 3rd edition.
- Listener's Lure (1906)
- An Oblique Narration (1906)
- Change for a Halfpenny (1906) with C. L. Graves
- Signs of the Times, with C. L. Graves
- The Doll Doctor (1907)
- Character and Comedy (1907)
- A Swan and her Friends (1907), about Anna Seward
- The Hambledon Men (1907), cricket history
- The Gentlest Art (1907), anthology of letters
- Another Book of Verses for Children (1907)
- Anne's Terrible Good Nature (1908)
- Over Bemerton's (1908), novel
- If: A Nightmare in the Conditional Mood (1908) with C. L. Graves
- Hustled History, Or, As It Might Have Been (1908), with C. L. Graves
- The Slowcoach (1908), fiction
- Mr Coggs and other songs for children (1908), with Liza Lehmann
- A Wanderer in Paris (1909)
- One Day and Another (1909)
- Farthest from the Truth (1909)
- Good Company – A Rally of Men (1909)
- Sir Pulteney (1910), as E. D. Ward, fantasy
- Mr Ingleside (1910), novel
- The Slowcoach (1910), illustrated by M.V. Wheelhouse
- The Second Post (1910), anthology of letters
- Old Lamps for New (1911)
- Harvest Home (1911, Macmillan (1913)
- What a Life! (1911), with George Morrow
- William Cowper's Letters (1911), editor
- A Wanderer in Florence (1912)
- London Lavender (1912)
- A Little of Everything (1912)
- Loiterer's Harvest (1913), essays
- A Group of Londoners, privately printed (Minneapolis) (1913)
- British Pictures and Their Painters (1913)
- Swollen Headed William (1914), parody
- A Wanderer in Venice (1914)
- All the Papers (1914), with C. L. Graves
- Landmarks (1914)
- A Picked Company: being a selection of writings (1915), editor
- Guillaumism, privately printed (London) (1915)
- Her Infinite Variety: A Feminine Portrait Gallery (1915), anthology
- In Gentlest Germany (1915)
- The Hausfrau Rampant (1916), novel
- Cloud and Silver (1916)
- The Vermilion Box (1916), novel
- London Revisited (1916)
- Variety Lane (1916)
- His Fatal Beauty: or, The Moore of Chelsea, privately printed (London) (1917)
- A Boswell of Baghdad (1917), essays
- Outposts of Mercy: The Record of a Visit to Various Units of the Red Cross in Italy (1917)
- Twixt Eagle & Dove (1918)
- The Phantom Journal and Other Essays and Diversions (1919)
- Quoth the Raven (1919)
- Mixed Vintages (1919)
- Traveller's Joy (1919)
- Adventures and Enthusiasms (1920)
- David Williams: Founder of the Royal Literary Fund (1920)
- Specially Selected (1920)
- Verena in the Midst (1920)
- Roving East and Roving West (1921)
- Urbanities (1921)
- Edwin Austin Abbey, Royal Academician, The Record of His Life and Work (1921), biography
- Rose and Rose (1922)
- Vermeer of Delft (1922)
- Giving and Receiving (1922)
- You Know What People Are (1922)
- Ginevra's Money (1922)
- Advisory Ben (1923)
- Luck of the Year (1923)
- Michael Angelo (1924)
- Rembrandt (1924)
- A Wanderer among Pictures (1924)
- As the Twig Is Straightened (1924)
- Encounters and Diversions (1924)
- The Same Star (1924), play
- Chardin and Vigee-Lebrun (1924)
- Michael Angelo (1924)
- Zigzags in France (1925)
- Playtime and Company (1925)
- John Constable the Painter (1925)
- Introducing London (1925)
- A Wanderer in Rome (1926)
- Wanderings and Diversions (1926)
- Events and Embroideries (1926)
- 365 Days and One More (1926)
- Frans Hals (1926), biography
- Giorgione (1926)
- Leonardo da Vinci (1926)
- Van Dyck (1926)
- Velasquez (1926)
- Selected Essays, edited by E. A. Woodhouse (1926)
- Twelve Songs From "Playtime & Company" (1926)
- A Cat Book (1927)
- The Joy of Life (1927), anthology of popular poetry
- A Fronded Isle (1927)
- The More I See of Men: Stray Essays on Dogs (1927)
- A Rover I Would Be (1928)
- Out of a Clear Sky (1928)
- Mr Punch's County Songs (1928)
- The Colvins and their Friends (1928), biography
- Introducing Paris (1928)
- Windfall's Eye (1929)
- Turning Things Over (1929), essays
- If Dogs Could Write: A Second Canine Miscellany (1929), anthology
- Vermeer the Magical (1929)
- Down the Sky (1930)
- Lippincott (1930)
- Traveller's Luck (1930), essays
- The Pekinese National Anthem (1930)
- And Such Small Deer (1931)
- The Barber's Clock: A Conversation Piece (1931)
- French Leaves (1931)
- Visibility Good (1931)
- No-Nose at the Show (1931)
- At the Sign of the Dove (1932)
- The Day of the Dog (1932)
- Lemon Verbena (1932), essays
- Reading, Writing, and Remembering (1932), autobiography
- English Leaves (1933)
- Saunterer's Rewards (1933)
- Postbag Diversions (1933)
- At the Shrine of St Charles (1934), for Charles Lamb anniversary
- Pleasure Trove (1935)
- The Old Contemporaries (1935)
- Only the Other Day (1936)
- London Afresh (1937)
- All of a Piece (1937)
- As the Bee Sucks (1937) illustrated by E. H. Shepard
- Adventures and Misgivings (1938)
- A Hundred Years of Trent Bridge (1938), editor
- Cricket All His Life (1950), edited by Rupert Hart-Davis, cricket writing
- Selected Essays of E. V. Lucas, edited by Herbert Newton Wethered (1954)
