= Edward Wyke-Smith =

English writer

E. A. Wyke-Smith
- Born: Edward Augustine Smith; 12 April 1871; United Kingdom
- Died: 16 May 1935 (aged 64)
- Occupation: Novelist
- Writing career
- Genre: Children's literature
- Notable work: The Marvellous Land of Snergs

Edward Augustine Wyke-Smith (12 April 1871 – 16 May 1935) was an English adventurer, mining engineer and writer. He is known mainly for The Marvellous Land of Snergs, a children's fantasy novel he wrote as E. A. Wyke-Smith, whose "snergs" provided inspiration for Tolkien's creation of hobbits.

== Biography ==
Born Edward Augustine Smith, he "reclaimed older family name Wyke-Smith" by deed poll.

After a time in the Horse Guards at Whitehall, Wyke-Smith joined the crew of a windjammer and sailed to Australia and the west coast of the United States. In the American West, he worked as a cowboy. Back in England, he studied mine engineering and later managed mines in Mexico, the Sinai, South America, Spain, Portugal and Norway. During the 1913 revolution in Mexico, he rescued his wife from the capital. He built a pontoon bridge across the Suez canal during the First World War.

According to John Clute, Wyke-Smith "began writing fantasy tales for his children as an apparent antidote to the experience of World War I." He wrote his first book, Bill of the Bustingforths, at his children's request. He went on to write several others, both for children and adults.

== Influence on Tolkien ==
J. R. R. Tolkien, author of The Hobbit and The Lord of the Rings is known to have read The Marvellous Land of Snergs to his children. He said, "I should like to record my own love and my children's love of E. A. Wyke-Smith's Marvellous Land of Snergs, at any rate of the snerg-element of that tale, and of Gorbo the gem of dunderheads, jewel of a companion in an escapade."

The similarities between the races of snergs and hobbits have led to speculation that the book was a major inspiration. They are similar in their physical descriptions, their love of communal feasting, and their names, particularly Gorbo and Bilbo. In all the books there are also journeys through dangerous forests and caverns.

== Works ==
=== Novels for children and adults ===
- Bill of the Bustingforths (1921), illustrated by Winifred Smith (uncredited), frontispiece by George Morrow, endpaper map by Alfred Bestall
- The Last of the Baron (1921), illus. Morrow
- Some Pirates and Marmaduke (1921), illus. Morrow
- Captain Quality (1922)
- The Second Chance (1923)
- Because of Josephine (1924)
- Fortune My Foe (1925)
- The Marvellous Land of Snergs (1927), illus. Morrow

=== Short works ===
- "A Lecture on Libraries, Their Acquisition and Maintenance" (1919)
- "One Touch of Dickens" (1920)
- "An Antiseptic for Efficiency" (1921)
- "Conversation without Words" (1921)
- "Tales within Tales" (1922)
- "Reconstructing the Past" (1921)
- "My Lord's Affairs: A Mediaeval Story" (1923)
- "The Compleat Mushroomer: A Sequel to Isaak Walton's 'Compleat Angler'" (1928)

== Other sources ==
- Douglas A. Anderson (annotations), J. R. R. Tolkien, The Annotated Hobbit (2002)
- Douglas A. Anderson Tales Before Tolkien: The Roots of Modern Fantasy (2003)
