= What a Life! (novel) =

Book by E. V. Lucas

- 1975 edition
- Author: E. V. Lucas & George Morrow
- Language: English
- Genre: Satirical, Autobiographical novel
- Publisher: Methuen
- Publication date: 17 August 1911
- Publication place: United Kingdom
- Media type: Print (hardback & paperback)

What A Life! is a work of satirical fiction by Edward Verrall Lucas and George Morrow published in 1911. The book is best known for its inventive narrative technique: the story takes the reader through the life of an upper-class British gentleman, with the plot being dictated by the book's illustrations, which the authors took from a copy of Whiteley's General Catalogue (Whiteley's was a London department store at the time). It was included in the 1936 MOMA exhibition "Fantastic Art, Dada, and Surrealism".

Though the book is still copyrighted in the United Kingdom, it is in the public domain in the US.

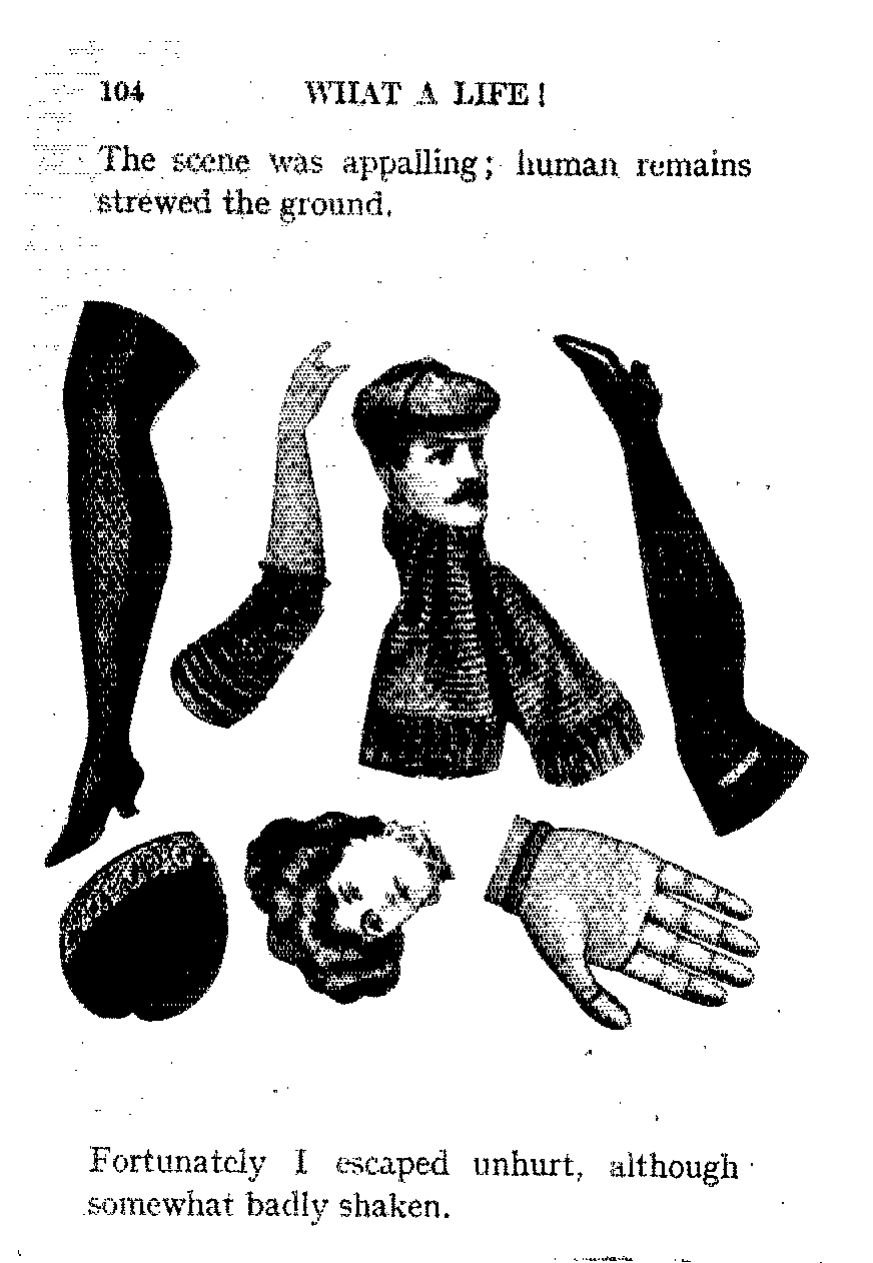
What a life !, p.104

== Release details ==
- 1911, UK, Methuen & Co. (ISBN NA), Pub date August 17, 1911, hardback (First edition)
- 1975, US, Dover Publications (ISBN 0-486-23133-X), Pub date ? ? 1975, paperback
- 1987, US, Dover Publications (ISBN 0-486-23133-X), Pub date May 20, 1987, paperback (reissue)
- 1987, UK, William Collins Sons & Co. (ISBN 0-00-217796-X), Pub date October 19, 1987, hardback
- 2015, FR, Quelle vie!, Editions Prairial (ISBN 979-10-93699-05-9), July 1, 2015, paperback
- 2018, US, Black Scat Books (ISBN 978-1-7323506-9-4), Pub date May 16, 2018, paperback
