= Hobbit =

Fictional race from J. R. R. Tolkien's legendarium

- Middle-earth race
- First appearance: The Hobbit
- Created by: J. R. R. Tolkien

In-universe information
- Other names: Halflings, Holbytlan, Periannath
- Home world: Middle-earth
- Capital: Michel Delving
- Base of operations: The Shire, Bree
- Sub-races: Harfoots, Fallohides, Stoors
- Language: Westron
- Leaders: Thain; Mayor of the Shire; Master of Buckland
- Notable members: Bilbo Baggins; Frodo Baggins; Samwise Gamgee; Merry Brandybuck; Pippin Took; Gollum

Hobbits are a fictional race of people in the novels of J. R. R. Tolkien. About half average human height, Tolkien presented hobbits as a variety of humanity, or close relatives thereof. Occasionally known as halflings in Tolkien's writings or “the little people”, they live barefooted, and traditionally dwell in homely underground houses which have windows, built into the sides of hills, though others live in houses. Their feet have naturally tough leathery soles (so they do not need shoes) and are covered on top with curly hair.

Hobbits first appeared in the 1937 children's novel The Hobbit, whose titular Hobbit, the protagonist Bilbo Baggins, is thrown into an unexpected adventure involving a dragon and its treasure hoard. In its sequel, The Lord of the Rings, the hobbits Frodo Baggins, Sam Gamgee, Pippin Took, and Merry Brandybuck are primary characters who all play key roles in fighting to save their world ("Middle-earth") from evil. In The Hobbit, hobbits live together in a small town called Hobbiton, which in The Lord of the Rings is identified as being part of a larger rural region called the Shire, the homeland of the hobbits in the northwest of Middle-earth. Some also live in a region east of the Shire, Bree-land, where they co-exist with Men.

The origins of the name and idea of "Hobbits" have been debated; literary antecedents include Sinclair Lewis's 1922 novel Babbitt, and Edward Wyke Smith's 1927 The Marvellous Land of Snergs. The word "hobbit" also appears in a list of ghostly beings in The Denham Tracts (1895), though these bear no similarity to Tolkien's Hobbits. Scholars have noted Tolkien's denial of a relationship with the word "rabbit", pointing to several lines of evidence to the contrary. Hobbits are modern, unlike the heroic ancient-style cultures of Gondor and Rohan, with familiar things like umbrellas, matches, and clocks. As such they mediate between the modern world known to readers and the heroic ancient world of Middle-earth.

Halflings appear as a race in Dungeons & Dragons, and the works of other fantasy authors including Terry Brooks, Jack Vance, and Clifford D. Simak.

== Origins of the word ==
Tolkien claimed that he started The Hobbit suddenly, without premeditation, in the midst of grading a set of student essay exams in 1930 or 1931, writing its famous opening line on a blank piece of paper: "In a hole in the ground there lived a hobbit".

=== In English literature ===
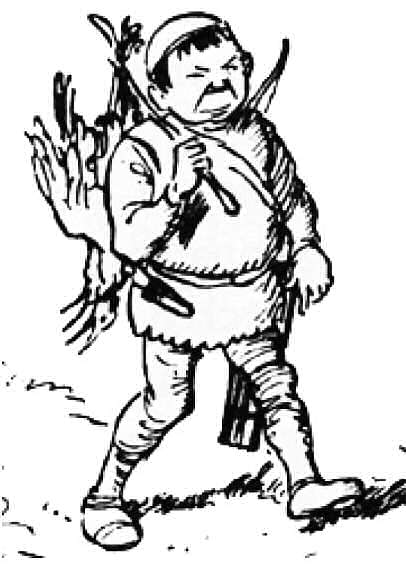
A Snerg with a bow and arrows. Edward Wyke-Smith's 1927 The Marvellous Land of Snergs is seen by Tolkien scholars as an influence on Tolkien's hobbits.

The term "hobbit", however, has real antecedents in modern English. One is a fact that Tolkien admitted: the title of Sinclair Lewis's 1922 novel Babbitt, about a "complacent American businessman" who goes through a journey of some kind of self-discovery, facing "near-disgrace"; the Tolkien scholar Tom Shippey observes that there are some parallels here with Bilbo's own journey.

According to a letter from Tolkien to W. H. Auden, one "probably ... unconscious" inspiration was Edward Wyke Smith's 1927 children's book The Marvellous Land of Snergs. (Note: Carpenter 2023, Letter 163 to W. H. Auden, 7 June 1955) Tolkien described the Snergs as "a race of people only slightly taller than the average table but broad in the shoulders and [who] have the strength of ten men."

Another possible origin emerged in 1977 when the Oxford English Dictionary announced that it had found the source that it supposed Tolkien to have used: James Hardy wrote in his 1895 The Denham Tracts, Volume 2: "The whole earth was overrun with ghosts, boggles ... hobbits, hobgoblins." Shippey writes that the list was of ghostly creatures without bodies, nothing like Tolkien's solid flesh-and-blood hobbits. Tolkien scholars consider it unlikely that Tolkien saw the list.

=== Rabbit ===
An additional connection is with rabbit, one that Tolkien "emphatically rejected", although the word appears in The Hobbit in connection with other characters' opinions of Bilbo in several places. Bilbo compares himself to a rabbit when he is with the eagle that carries him; the eagle, too, tells Bilbo not to be "frightened like a rabbit". The giant bear-man Beorn teases Bilbo and jokes that "little bunny is getting nice and fat again", while the dwarf Thorin shakes Bilbo "like a rabbit".

Shippey writes that the rabbit is not a native English species, but was deliberately introduced in the 13th century, and has become accepted as a local wild animal. Shippey compares this "situation of anachronism-cum-familiarity" with the lifestyle of the Hobbit, giving the example of smoking "pipeweed". He argues that Tolkien did not want to write "tobacco", as it did not arrive until the 16th century, so Tolkien invented a calque made of English words. Donald O'Brien, writing in Mythlore, notes, too, that Aragorn's description of Frodo's priceless mithril mail-shirt, "here's a pretty hobbit-skin to wrap an elven-princeling in", is a "curious echo" of the English nursery rhyme "To find a pretty rabbit-skin to wrap the baby bunting in."

Tom Shippey's analysis of the parallels between "Hobbit" and "Rabbit"
Feature	"Hobbit"	"Rabbit"
Neologism	Tolkien, 1937	1398 (OED)
Etymology	Doubtful, see text	Unknown before Middle English
Familiar; Anachronism	Smokes "pipeweed", but tobacco did not arrive until 16th century	Introduced species but accepted as native
Appearance	Small, plump (and also edible)	
Name	Called "rabbit" by Bert the troll, eagle; called "little bunny" by Beorn	(both are common names)

=== Fictional etymology ===
As a philologist, Tolkien provided a backstory for many of the invented names featured in his stories. For Hobbits, he has King Théoden of Rohan say "the Halflings, that some among us call the Holbytlan". (Note: Tolkien 1954, book 3, ch. 8 "The Road to Isengard") Tolkien set out a fictional etymology for the word "Hobbit" in an appendix to The Lord of the Rings, that it was derived from holbytla (plural holbytlan), (Note: Tolkien 1955, Appendix F, 2. "On Translation", "Note on three names: Hobbit, Gamgee, and Brandywine") meaning "hole-builder". This was Tolkien's own new construction from Old English hol, "a hole or hollow", and bytlan, "to build".

== Description ==
=== Characteristics ===
Tolkien describes hobbits as between two and four feet (0.6–1.2 m) tall, with the average height being three feet six inches (1.1 m). They dress in bright colours, favouring yellow and green. They are usually shy, but are nevertheless capable of great courage and amazing feats under the proper circumstances. They are adept at throwing stones. For the most part, they cannot grow beards, but a few Stoor hobbits can. Their feet are covered with curly hair (usually brown, as is the hair on their heads) and have leathery soles, so Hobbits hardly ever wear shoes. (Note: Tolkien 1954a, "Prologue") Hobbits are not quite as stocky as the similarly sized dwarves, but still tend to be stout, with slightly pointed ears. Tolkien clarified their appearance in a 1938 letter to his American publisher: (Note: Carpenter 2023, letter 27 to Houghton Mifflin Company, probably March or April 1938, specifically about Bilbo Baggins)

I picture a fairly human figure, not a kind of 'fairy' rabbit as some of my British reviewers seem to fancy: fattish in the stomach, shortish in the leg. A round, jovial face; ears only slightly pointed and 'elvish'; hair short and curling (brown). The feet from the ankles down, covered with brown hairy fur. Clothing: green velvet breeches; red or yellow waistcoat; brown or green jacket; gold (or brass) buttons; [and specifically for Bilbo, in The Hobbit] a dark green hood and cloak (belonging to a dwarf).

Tolkien presented hobbits as relatives of the human race, or a "variety" (Note: Tolkien 1975, Firstborn) or separate "branch" (Note: Carpenter 2023, Letter 131 to Milton Waldman, late 1951) of humanity. In Tolkien's fictional world, hobbits and other races are aware of the similarities between humans and hobbits (hence the colloquial terms for each other of "Big People" and "Little People"); nevertheless, hobbits consider themselves a separate people. (Note: Tolkien 1954a, Book II, Chapter 1 "Many Meetings". "If you can't distinguish between a Man and a Hobbit, your judgement is poorer than I imagined. They're as different as peas and apples.")

The race's average life expectancy is 100 years, but some of Tolkien's main Hobbit characters live much longer: Bilbo Baggins and the Old Took are described as living to the age of 130 or beyond, though Bilbo's long lifespan owes much to his possession of the One Ring. Hobbits are considered to "come of age" on their 33rd birthday, so a 50-year-old hobbit would be regarded as entering middle-age. (Note: Tolkien 1954a, "Prologue", 1. "Concerning Hobbits")

=== Types ===
Hobbits are described as being of three types, Harfoots, Fallohides, and Stoors, all deriving from a region to the east of the Shire, in particular the Angle between two rivers, and migrating to the Shire at different times.

Tolkien devised a fictional history with three types of hobbits, with different physical characteristics and temperaments: Harfoots, Fallohides, and Stoors. By the time of Bilbo and Frodo, these kinds had intermixed for centuries, though unevenly, so that some families and regions skewed more towards descent from one of the three groups.

The Harfoots were by far the most numerous group of hobbits and were the first to enter the land of Eriador, which contains the Shire and Bree. They were the smallest in stature, "browner of skin" in complexion, and the most typical of the race as described in The Hobbit. They lived in holes, or smials, and had closer relations with Dwarves than other hobbits did. Harfoots tended to live in gentle rolling hill country, and were mostly agrarian. They were the first group to cross the Misty Mountains, settling in the lands around Bree starting in Third Age 1050 (about 2,000 years before the time of Bilbo and Frodo, and five and a half centuries before the founding of the Shire in Third Age 1601). Tolkien coined the term "Harfoot" as analogous to "hairfoot".

The Fallohides were the least numerous, and the second group to enter Eriador. They were generally fair-haired, and taller and slimmer than other Hobbits. While the other two types of hobbit were on average about three and a half feet tall, Fallohides were closer on average to four feet. They were more adventurous than the other breeds and preferred living in woodlands, where they became skilled huntsmen, known for their accuracy with ranged weapons. They had closer relations with Elves, who also tended to live in forests. Due to their contact with the Elves, Fallohides were the first hobbits to learn literacy, and therefore were the only ones who preserved even vague knowledge of their past before crossing the Misty Mountains. The Fallohides crossed into Eriador about a century after the Harfoots did, and settled in the pre-existing Harfoot villages of the Bree-land. Never very numerous, the Fallohides intermixed with and were largely absorbed by the Harfoots during this time, though several prominent families such as the Tooks and the Masters of Buckland had a substantial Fallohide descent, unlike many of the people that they led. After about four centuries, a large expedition of hobbits migrated westward from Bree-land led by the Fallohide brothers Marcho and Blancho, who settled and founded the Shire in TA 1601.

Bilbo and three of the four principal hobbit characters in The Lord of the Rings (Frodo, Pippin, and Merry) had Fallohide blood through their common ancestor, the Old Took. The one physical description given for Frodo matches this, as Gandalf identifies him as "taller than some, and fairer than most". (Note: Tolkien 1954a, book 1, ch. 10, "Strider") Tolkien created the name from the archaic meanings of English words "fallow" and "hide", meaning "pale skin".

The Stoors were the second most numerous group of hobbits and the last to enter Eriador. They were quite different from the other two groups: they were stockier than other hobbits, though slightly shorter, and they were also the only group whose males were able to grow beards. They had an affinity for water, dwelt mostly beside rivers, and were the only hobbits to use boats and swim, activities which other hobbits considered dangerous and frightening. Their hands and feet were sturdier than those of other hobbits, who generally did not wear shoes. Because the Stoors tended to live near muddy riverbanks they often wore boots to keep their feet dry. Tolkien says they were "less shy of Men". The Stoors migrated into Eriador two centuries after the Fallohides did, but instead of settling in Bree-land they headed farther south to Dunland by Third Age 1300, finally migrating to the newly founded Shire in Third Age 1630, the last of the three groups to arrive. The Stoors mostly settled along the banks of the River Brandywine in the east of the Shire, thus many hobbits of Buckland and the Marish were of Stoor descent. Due to the time the Stoors spent living in Dunland before migrating to the Shire, their names have a slight Celtic influence.

A small group of Stoors did not go as far south as Dunland but settled in the wetlands of the Angle in southern Rhudaur, between Dunland and Bree. When the evil power of Angmar rose in the north many of these Stoors joined their kin in Dunland, but some fled back east over the mountains and settled in the marshes of the Gladden Fields: Déagol and Sméagol/Gollum both belonged to this group. (Note: Tolkien 1980, part 3, ch. 4 "The Hunt for the Ring", note 9) Tolkien used the Old English word stor or stoor, meaning "strong".

=== Lifestyle and culture ===
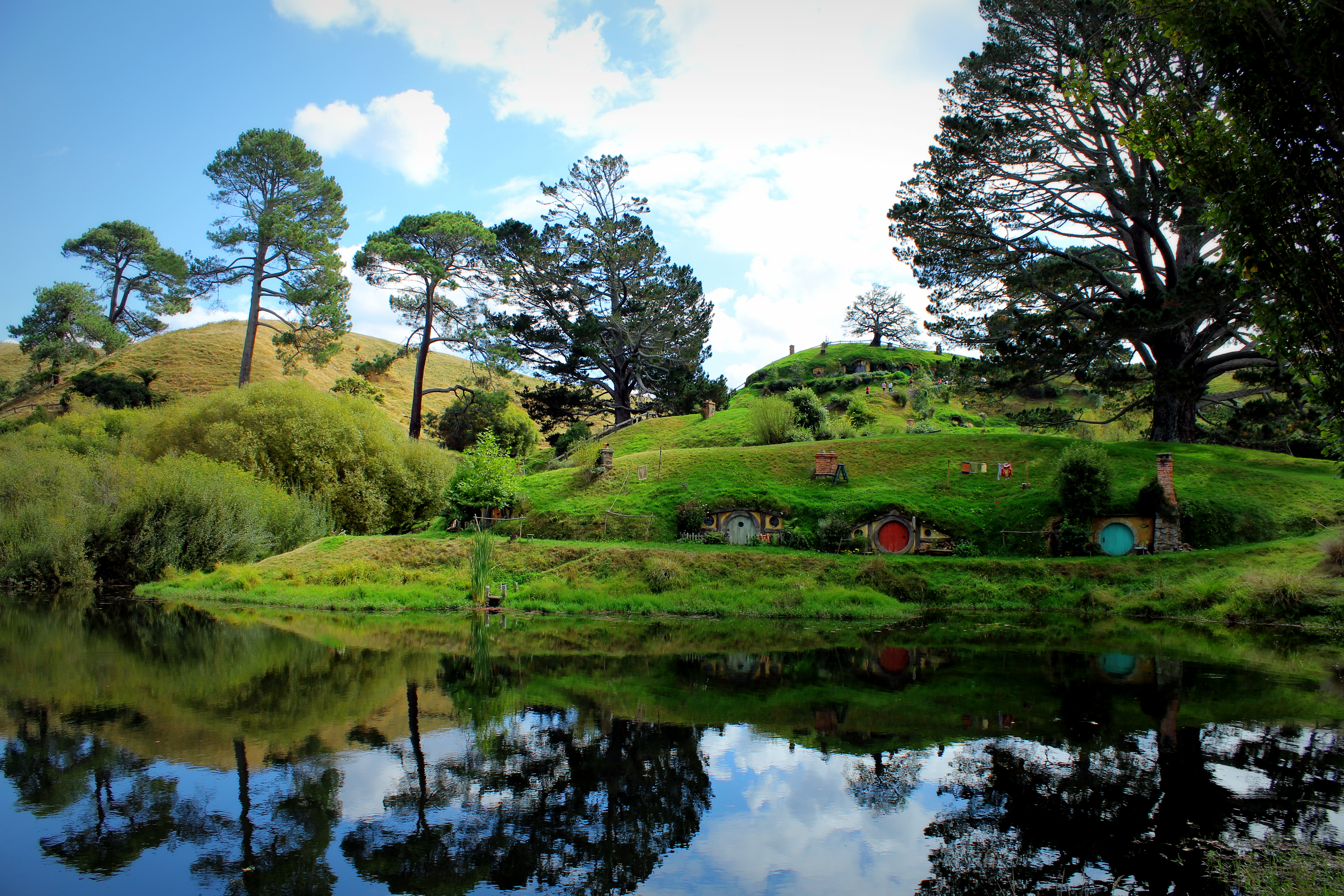
Hobbit holes or smials as depicted in Peter Jackson's The Lord of the Rings film trilogy

In his writings, Tolkien depicted hobbits as fond of an unadventurous, bucolic and simple life of farming, eating, and socializing, although capable of defending their homes courageously if the need arises. They would enjoy six meals a day, if they could get them. They claimed to have invented the art of smoking pipe-weed. (Note: Tolkien 1954a, "Prologue", 2. "Concerning Pipe-weed") They were extremely "clannish" and had strong "predilections for genealogy"; accordingly, Tolkien included several Hobbit family trees in The Lord of the Rings.

The hobbits of the Shire developed the custom of giving away gifts on their birthdays, instead of receiving them, although this custom was not universally followed among other hobbit cultures or communities. (Note: Gollum refers to the One Ring as his "birthday present" in The Hobbit. (Note: Tolkien 1937, ch. 5 "Riddles in the Dark")) The term mathom is used for old and useless objects, but which hobbits are unwilling to throw away. Mathoms are invariably given as presents many times over, sometimes returning to the original owner, or are stored in a museum (mathom-house).

The hobbits had a distinct calendar: every year started on a Saturday and ended on a Friday, with each of the twelve months consisting of thirty days. Some special days did not belong to any month—Yule 1 and 2 (New Year's Eve and New Years Day) and three Lithedays in mid-summer. Every fourth year there was an extra Litheday, most likely as an adaptation, similar to a leap year, to ensure that the calendar remained in time with the seasons. (Note: Tolkien 1955, Appendix D)

Tolkien stated that he liked gardens, trees, and wearing waistcoats, just as hobbits did; he was often photographed with trees. (Note: Carpenter 2023, Letter 213 to Deborah Webster, 25 October 1958)

Hobbits traditionally live in "hobbit-holes", or smials, underground homes found in hillsides, downs, and banks, though others lived in houses. It has been suggested that the soil or ground of the Shire consists of loess and that this facilitates the construction of hobbit-holes. Loess is a yellow soil, which would explain the colour of the Brandywine River, and the nature of the bricks made at Stock, the main Shire brickyard. (Note: A stock brick is a handmade yellow brick from Southeast England.) Hobbit architecture favours round doors and windows.

Tolkien likened his own tastes to those of hobbits in a 1958 letter:

I am in fact a Hobbit in all but size. I like gardens, trees, and unmechanized farmlands; I smoke a pipe, and like good plain food (unrefrigerated), but detest French cooking; I like, and even dare to wear in these dull days, ornamental waistcoats. I am fond of mushrooms (out of a field); have a very simple sense of humour (which even my appreciative critics find tiresome); I go to bed late and get up late (when possible). I do not travel much.

== Fictional history ==
=== In Rhovanion ===
In their earliest folk tales, hobbits appear to have lived in Rhovanion, in the Valley of Anduin, between Mirkwood and the Misty Mountains. According to The Lord of the Rings, they had lost the genealogical details of how they are related to the Big People. Still, Tolkien clearly states in "Concerning Hobbits" that hobbits are not technically a distinct race from Men, the way that Elves or Dwarves are, but branched off from other humans in the distant past of the Elder Days. Many eons later, but still early in the Third Age, the ancient hobbits lived in the valley of the Anduin River, close by the Éothéod, the ancestors of the Rohirrim. This led to some contact between the two, and as a result many old words and names in "Hobbitish" are derivatives of words in Rohirric (which Tolkien "translated" into his text by presenting it as Old English).

The Harfoots lived on the lowest slopes of the Misty Mountains in Hobbit-holes dug into the hillsides. They were not only smaller and shorter, but also beard- and bootless. The Stoors lived on the marshy Gladden Fields where the Gladden River met the Anduin, and were broader and heavier in build; and the Fallohides preferred to live in the woods under the Misty Mountains. They were described as fairer of skin and hair, as well as taller and slimmer than the rest of the hobbits.

=== Migration to the West ===
The three peoples who founded England included those who came from the Angle between Flensburg Fjord and the Schlei, from the East (across the North Sea), hence the name "England". The migrations of these three peoples are reflected in those of the three types of Hobbits.

In the Third Age, hobbits undertook the arduous task of crossing the Misty Mountains—a migration period they refer to as the "Wandering Days", the earliest remembered time in their history. Reasons for this trek are unknown, but they possibly had to do with Sauron's growing power in nearby Greenwood, which later became known as Mirkwood as a result of the shadow that fell upon it during his search of the forest for the One Ring. Hobbits took different routes in their journey westward, but as they began to settle together in Bree-land, Dunland, and the Angle formed by the rivers Mitheithel and Bruinen, the divisions between the hobbit-kinds began to blur. Shippey explains that the name "Angle" has a special resonance, as the name "England" comes from the Angle (Anglia) between the Flensburg Fjord and the River Schlei, in the north of Germany next to Denmark, the origin of the Angles among the Anglo-Saxons who founded England. Further, the migrations of the three types of hobbit mirror those of England's founders.

=== Foundation of the Shire ===
In the year 1601 of the Third Age (year 1 in the Shire Reckoning), two Fallohide brothers named Marcho and Blanco gained permission from the King of Arnor at Fornost to cross the River Brandywine and settle on the other side. The new land that they founded on the west bank of the Brandywine was called The Shire. Many hobbits followed them, and by the end of the Third Age most hobbits outside The Shire could be found in their village of Staddle on the southeastern slopes of Bree-hill. However, some also lived with Men in the village of Bree itself and in nearby Archet and Combe. (Note: Tolkien 1954a, At the Sign of The Prancing Pony)

Originally the hobbits of the Shire swore nominal allegiance to the last Kings of Arnor, being required only to acknowledge their lordship, speed their messengers, and keep the bridges and roads in repair. During the final fight against Angmar at the Battle of Fornost, the hobbits maintain that they sent a company of archers to help but this is nowhere else recorded. After the battle, the kingdom of Arnor was destroyed, and in the absence of the king, the hobbits elected a Thain of the Shire from among their own chieftains.

The first Thain of the Shire was Bucca of the Marish, who founded the Oldbuck family. However, the Oldbuck family later crossed the Brandywine River to create the separate land of Buckland and the family name changed to the familiar "Brandybuck". Their patriarch then became Master of Buckland. With the departure of the Oldbucks/Brandybucks, a new family was selected to have its chieftains be Thain: the Took family (Pippin Took was son of the Thain and would later become Thain himself). The Thain was in charge of Shire Moot and Muster and the Hobbitry-in-Arms, but as the hobbits of the Shire generally led entirely peaceful, uneventful lives the office of Thain came to be seen as something of a formality.

Hobbits first appear in The Hobbit as the rural people of the Shire; the book tells of the unexpected adventure that happened to one of them, Bilbo, as a party of Dwarves seeks to recover an ancient treasure from the hoard of a dragon. They are again central to The Lord of the Rings, an altogether darker tale, where Bilbo's younger cousin Frodo sets out from the Shire to destroy the Ring that Bilbo had brought home.

== Analysis ==
=== Moral significance ===
While Tolkien was infamous for disliking allegory, the Tolkien critic Paul H. Kocher notes that Tolkien's literary techniques require readers to view hobbits as like humans, especially when placed under moral pressure to survive a war that threatens to devastate their land. Frodo becomes in some ways the symbolic representation of the conscience of hobbits, a point made explicitly in the story "Leaf by Niggle" which Tolkien wrote at the same time as the first nine chapters of The Lord of the Rings. Niggle is a painter struggling against the summons of death to complete his one great canvas, a picture of a tree with a background of forest and distant mountains. He dies with the work incomplete, undone by his imperfectly generous heart: "it made him uncomfortable more often than it made him do anything". After discipline in Purgatory, however, Niggle finds himself in the very landscape depicted by his painting which he is now able to finish with the assistance of a neighbour who obstructed him during life. The picture complete, Niggle is free to journey to the distant mountains which represent the highest stage of his spiritual development. Thus, upon recovery from the wound inflicted by the Witch-King of Angmar on Weathertop, Gandalf speculates that the hobbit Frodo "may become like a glass filled with a clear light for eyes to see that can". Similarly, as Frodo nears Mount Doom he casts aside weapons and refuses to fight others with physical force: "For him struggles for the right must hereafter be waged only on the moral plane".

=== Modern mediators ===
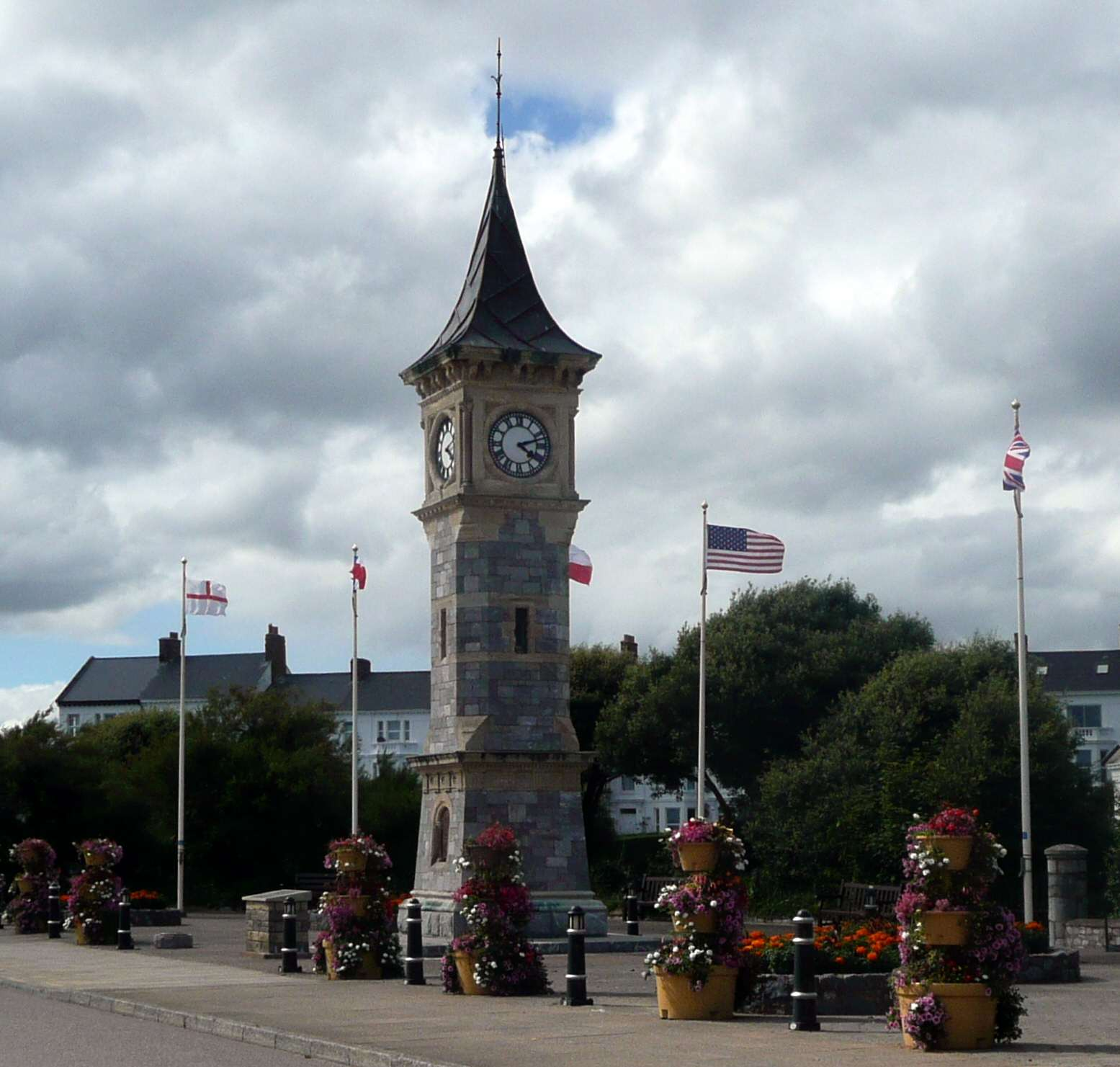
Tolkien dated the Shire to the time of the Diamond Jubilee of Queen Victoria, 1897, when Exmouth's Jubilee clock was built. (Note: Carpenter 2023, #178 to Allen & Unwin, 12 December 1955)

Tolkien scholars including Shippey and Dimitra Fimi have stated that the hobbits are misfits in Middle-earth's heroic cultures like Gondor and Rohan. Those have a basis in ancient societies such as ancient Rome and the Anglo-Saxons. In contrast, Tolkien placed the Shire in a society he had personally experienced, "more or less a Warwickshire village of about the period of the Diamond Jubilee [of Queen Victoria, in 1897]". Shippey described hobbit culture, complete with tobacco and potatoes, as a "creative anachronism" on Tolkien's part. In his view, anachronism is the "essential function" of hobbits, enabling Tolkien to "bridge the gap" by mediating between readers' lives in the modern world and the dangerous ancient world of Middle-earth.

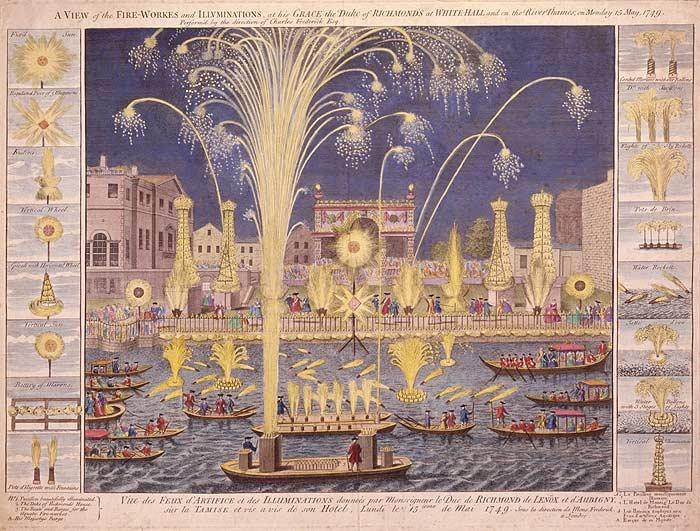
Fireworks (England's Royal Fireworks of 1749 pictured) are among the anachronistically modern material features of hobbits' lives.

Fimi comments that this applies both to the style of language used by hobbits, and to their material culture of "umbrellas, camping kettles, matches, clocks, pocket handkerchiefs and fireworks", all of which are plainly modern, as are the fish and chips that Sam Gamgee thinks of on his journey to Mordor. Most striking, in her view, however, is Tolkien's description of the enormous dragon firework at Bilbo's party which rushed overhead "like an express train". Tolkien's drawing of the hall of Bilbo's home, Bag End, shows both a clock and a barometer (mentioned in an early draft), and he had another clock on his mantelpiece. (Note: Tolkien 1937, Chapter 2. Roast Mutton. "If you had dusted the mantelpiece you would have found this just under the clock,' said Gandalf, handing Bilbo a note" [from Thorin].) (Note: Tolkien, J. R. R. Bilbo's last Song: (for "XIV. Return to Hobbiton" note 21) "the Hornblower who received the barometer now changes from Cosimo (by way of Carambo) to Colombo." (A Long-expected Party): "For Cosimo Chubb, treat it as your own, Bingo: on the barometer. Cosimo used to bang it with a large fat finger whenever he came to call. He was afraid of getting wet, and wore a scarf and macintosh all the year round.") To arrange a party, hobbits rely on a daily postal service. The effect, the scholars agree, is to bring the reader comfortably into the ancient heroic world.

The Hobbits' "strikingly anachronistic" material culture
Object	First existed	Notes
Tobacco	After 1492	Columbian exchange brought it to Europe
Potato	After 1492	As for tobacco
Umbrella	18th century	Folding umbrellas, Paris
Camping kettle	After 1880s	Camping trips on River Thames; Kelly Kettle from end of 19th century
Safety match	1850s	Lundström brothers, Sweden
Clock	13th century	First clocks in church towers
Pocket handkerchief	19th century	In pocket of two-piece suit
Fireworks	10th century	Made in Europe by 14th century
Express train	19th century	"certainly unimaginable in Middle-earth"
Fish and chips	1860s	First fish and chip shops in England
Postal service	1840	Uniform Penny Post

== In popular culture ==
=== Fantasy ===
Harfoots in The Rings of Power

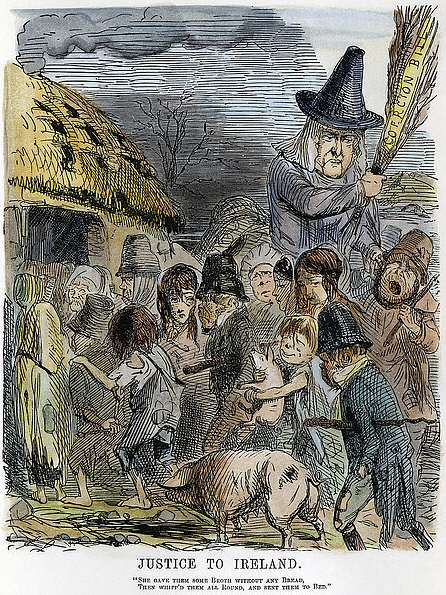
John Leech's cartoon "Justice to Ireland", c. 1845

The harfoots in The Rings of Power speak in Irish accents and have been said to resemble Leech's "wildly unflattering" Irish peasants.

Dungeons & Dragons began using the name halfling as an alternative to hobbit for legal reasons. Fantasy authors including Terry Brooks, Jack Vance, and Clifford D. Simak use races of halflings.

Peter Jackson's films of The Lord of the Rings and The Hobbit made extensive use of prosthetics. Wētā Workshop spent a year creating hobbit feet to look like large, furry feet, yet act as shoes for the actors. In total, 1,800 pairs were worn by the four lead hobbit actors during production. In addition, actors went in for face casts to create pointed ears and false noses.

The Lord of the Rings: The Rings of Power, a series screened from 2022, has attracted "fierce debate" about its handling of race, and racism aimed at the non white actors playing some of the Harfoots. The fantasy author Neil Gaiman, defending the casting, commented that "Tolkien described the Harfoots as "browner of skin" than the other Hobbits. So I think anyone grumbling is either racist or hasn't read their Tolkien." Commentators have observed that the hobbit-like Harfoots speak in Irish accents, behave as friendly peasants, and are accompanied by Celtic music; and that they resemble the 19th century caricaturist John Leech's "wildly unflattering" depictions of the Irish in Punch magazine.

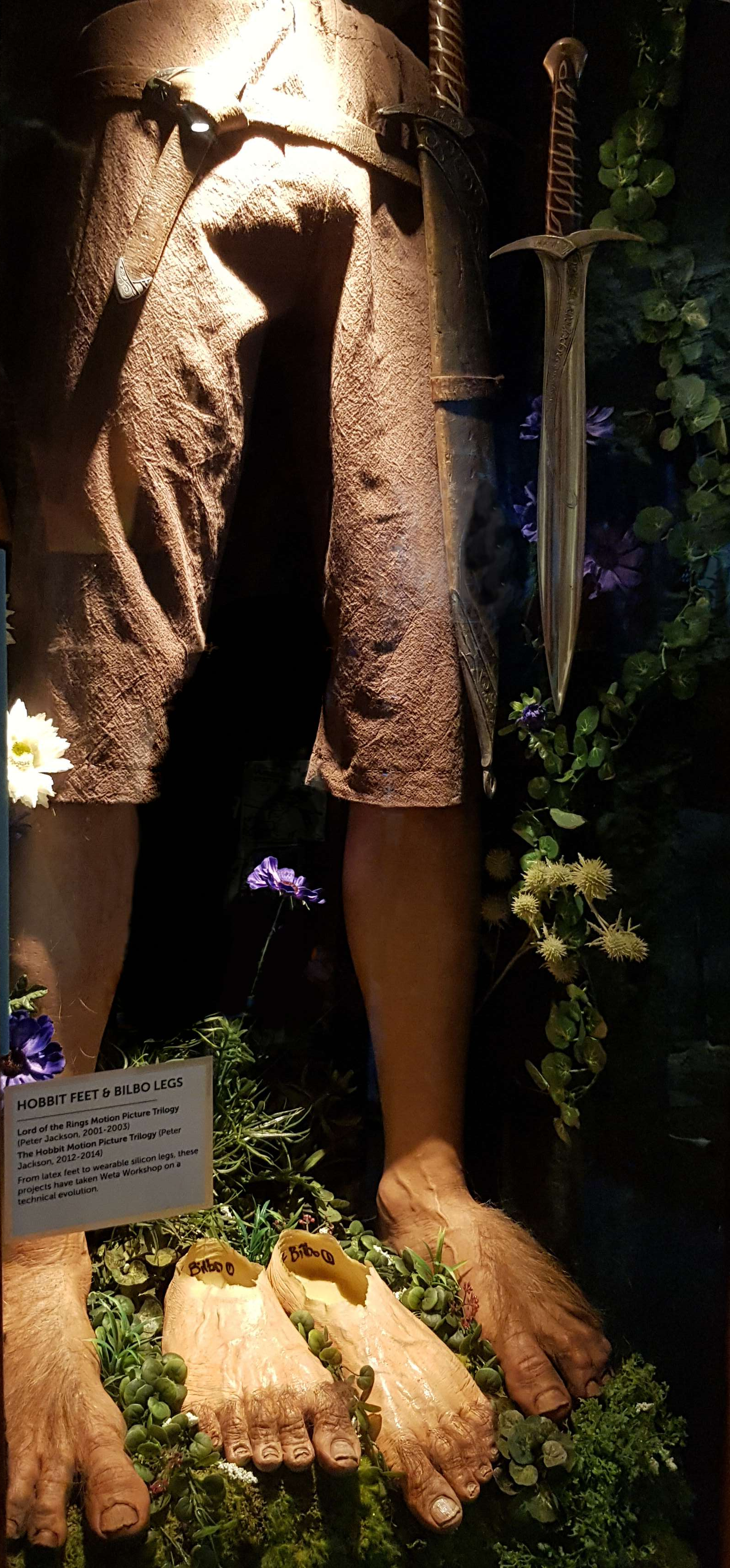
Hobbit feet used in The Hobbit films served as shoes for the actors.

=== Popular music ===
The comic horror rock band Rosemary's Billygoat recorded a song and video called "Hobbit Feet", about a man who takes a girl home from a bar only to discover she has horrifying "hobbit feet". According to lead singer Mike Odd, the band received over 100 pieces of hate mail from angry Tolkien fans.

=== Fossil hominids ===
The skeletal remains of several diminutive paleolithic hominids were discovered on the Indonesian island of Flores in 2004. The fossils, of a species named Homo floresiensis after the island on which the remains were found, were informally dubbed "Hobbits" by their discoverers in a series of articles published in the scientific journal Nature. The excavated skeletons reveal a hominid that (like a Hobbit) grew no larger than a three-year-old modern child and had proportionately larger feet than modern humans.

== See also ==
- Hobbit Day

== Sources ==
- Carpenter, Humphrey (1978) [1977]. J. R. R. Tolkien: A Biography. George Allen & Unwin. ISBN 0-049-28039-2.
- Carpenter, Humphrey, ed. (2023) [1981]. The Letters of J. R. R. Tolkien: Revised and Expanded Edition. New York: HarperCollins. ISBN 978-0-35-865298-4.
- Clark Hall, J. R. (2002) [1894]. A Concise Anglo-Saxon Dictionary (4th ed.). University of Toronto Press.
- Fimi, Dimitra (2010) [2008]. Tolkien, Race, and Cultural History: From Fairies to Hobbits. Palgrave Macmillan. ISBN 978-0-230-21951-9. OCLC 222251097.
- Flowers, Michael (2017). ""Hobbits?...And what may they be?"". Journal of Tolkien Research. 4 (1). Article 2.
- Hammond, Wayne G.; Scull, Christina (1995). J. R. R. Tolkien: Artist and Illustrator. Illustrated by J. R. R. Tolkien. Boston: Houghton Mifflin. ISBN 0-395-74816-X.
- Kocher, Paul H. (1974). Master of Middle Earth. The Achievement of J.R.R. Tolkien. Penguin Books. ISBN 0-14-003877-9.
- Shippey, Tom (2001). J. R. R. Tolkien: Author of the Century. HarperCollins. ISBN 978-0261-10401-3.
- Shippey, Tom (2005) [1982]. The Road to Middle-Earth: How J. R. R. Tolkien Created a New Mythology (Third ed.). HarperCollins. ISBN 978-0-261-10275-0.
- Stanton, Michael N. (2013) [2007]. "Hobbits". In Drout, Michael D.C. (ed.). J.R.R. Tolkien Encyclopedia. Routledge. pp. 280–282. ISBN 978-0-415-86511-1.
- Tolkien, J. R. R. (1937). The Hobbit. United Kingdom: George Allen & Unwin.
- Tolkien, J. R. R. (1954a). The Fellowship of the Ring. The Lord of the Rings. Boston: Houghton Mifflin. OCLC 9552942.
- Tolkien, J. R. R. (1954). The Two Towers. The Lord of the Rings. Boston: Houghton Mifflin. OCLC 1042159111.
- Tolkien, J. R. R. (1955). The Return of the King. The Lord of the Rings. Boston: Houghton Mifflin. OCLC 519647821.
- Tolkien, J. R. R. (1975). "Guide to the Names in The Lord of the Rings" (PDF). In Lobdell, Jared (ed.). A Tolkien Compass. Open Court. pp. 155–201. ISBN 978-0875-48316-0.
- Tolkien, J. R. R. (1980). Christopher Tolkien (ed.). Unfinished Tales. Boston: Houghton Mifflin. ISBN 978-0-395-29917-3.
