= John Inglesant =

1881 novel by Joseph Henry Shorthouse

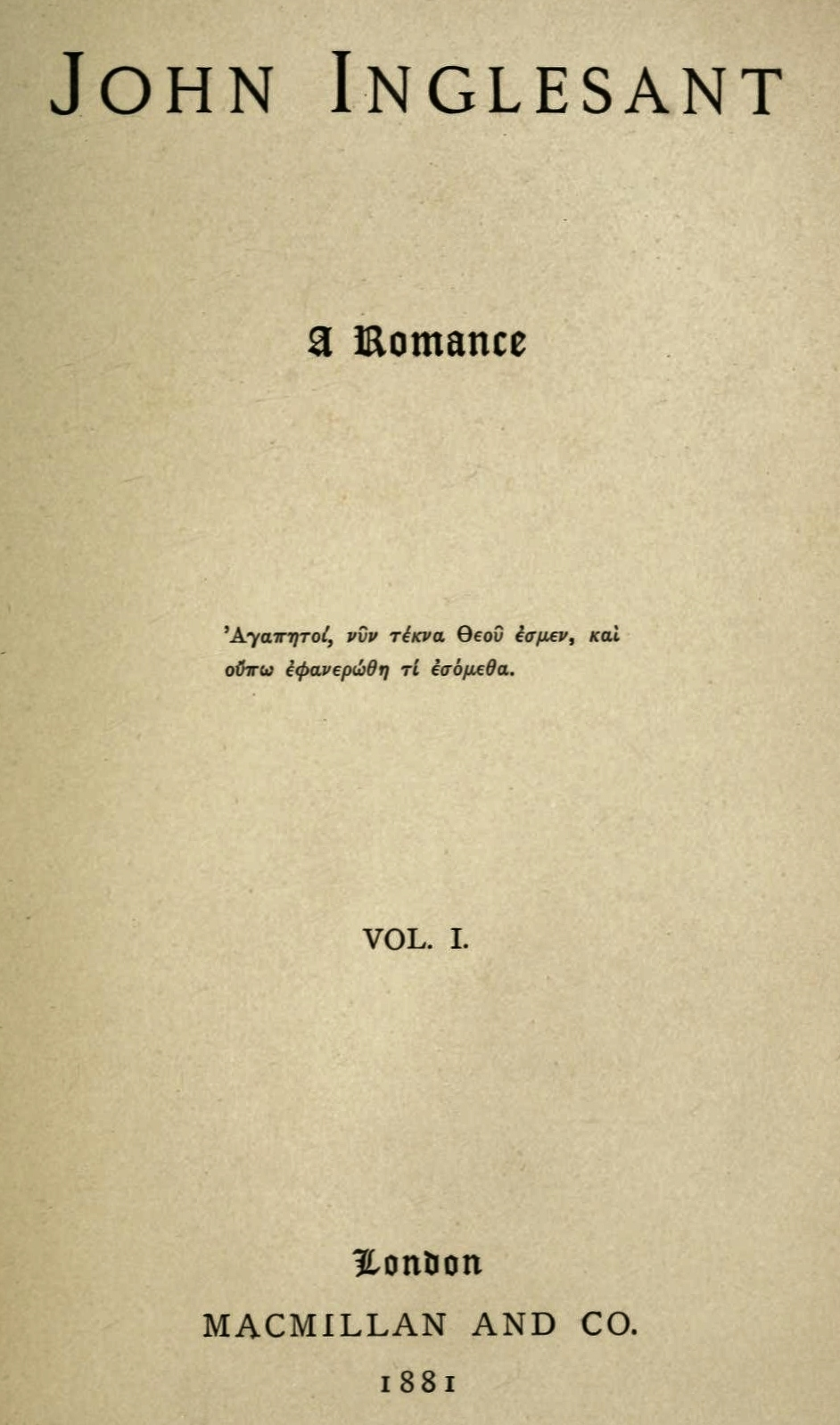
- First edition title page
- Author: Joseph Henry Shorthouse
- Publisher: Macmillan Publishers
- Publication date: 1881

John Inglesant is a celebrated historical novel by Joseph Henry Shorthouse, published in 1881, and set mainly in the middle years of the 17th century.

== Story ==
The eponymous hero is an Anglican, despite being educated partly by Jesuits, and remains so, largely on the advice of his Jesuit mentor, despite strong temptations to convert to Roman Catholicism. Even so, he finds himself involved in intrigues between the Roman Catholic Church and the High Church party of the Church of England, and becomes a courtier of Charles I. He also spends some time at the Little Gidding community in Huntingdonshire, where he falls in love (the girl soon dies). He fights on the Royalist side in the English Civil War, is wounded at the battle of Edgehill, and fights at Naseby. As a result of his role in negotiations on the King's behalf in Ireland, he is tried and condemned for treason; he only narrowly escapes execution. Soon afterwards his brother is murdered, and he pursues his brother's murderer to Italy, where among much else (including marriage) he observes a Papal Conclave as it elects a new Pope in Rome.

== Analysis ==
Despite all the above, this is a book of ideas, not action. Almost every page of brisk activity is followed by at least two more of debate on such topics as Arminianism, Quietism, or the Papacy. Even by the standards of its time, it is quite long, not like the all-action mode of the 21st century. It nonetheless has what might be described as a cult following.

Its subtitle ('John Inglesant: a romance') may be misleading to modern readers; it implies free invention, not love interest, and the book has little or nothing in common with the romance novel of the present day.

== Legacy ==
Holly Ordway notes that J. R. R. Tolkien remained interested in Shorthouse's "strange, long-forgotten" novel, and suggests that John Inglesant's "moral conflict and competing loyalties" and its "providentially freeing climax consequent upon the exercise of pity" are reflected in "perhaps the key theme" of The Lord of the Rings.
