= Blizzard of January 1881 =

January 1881 snowstorm in the UK

January 1881 Snowstorm
- Blizzard at its height on 19 January.

Meteorological history
- Formed: 10 January 1881
- Dissipated: 23 January

Blizzard
- Lowest pressure: 985
- Lowest temp: −30.0 °C (−22.0 °F)
- Max. snowfall: 4 ft (120 cm): Dartmoor, United Kingdom

Overall effects
- Casualties: 100 (estimated)
- Areas affected: United Kingdom, Belgium, France, Netherlands

The southern parts of the United Kingdom were hit by a severe blizzard from 17 to 20 January 1881.

On 17 January 1881, a low pressure system rapidly developed in the English Channel. The snowfalls began on the 17th in the southwest and as the system deepened as it moved through the Channel, a gale force easterly developed over southern parts with heavy blizzards and drifting snow. The blizzard paralysed all transport, communication, trade and industries. Hundreds of miles of rail track were blocked by drifting snow, dozens of feet high in places. Even in central London, there were 3-foot drifts in places. Around 100 people are believed to have died as a result of the blizzard. The storm was accompanied by extreme cold.

== Temperatures ==
The severity of the frosts was remarkable and they were probably second only to those that occurred during February 1895 in intensity and length. The Central England temperature for the period of 8th to 27th was −4.4 °C.

Note that, due to non-standard exposures, many of the contemporary reported temperatures are no longer accepted by the Meteorological Office.

Other low minima.

| Location | Date | Temperature |
|---|---|---|
| Aberdeen | 17 Jan | −15.6 °C |
| Banbury | 20 Jan | −15 °C |
| Barnstaple | 22 Jan | −14.4 °C |
| Bodmin | 26 Jan | −13.3 °C |
| Braemar | 17 Jan | −20 °C |
| Camden Square | 17 Jan | −11.2 °C |
| Cork | 15 Jan | −13.3 °C |
| Galway | 17 Jan | −10.6 °C |
| Hitchin | 20 Jan | −15 °C |
| Llandudno | 26 Jan | −9.7 °C |
| Derry | 22 Jan | −10 °C |
| Manchester | 17 Jan | −12.2 °C |
| Manchester | 26 Jan | −12.2 °C |
| Norwich | 26 Jan | −17.2 °C |
| Omagh | 23 Jan | −19.4 °C |
| Skipton | 25 Jan | −18.9 °C |
| Waterford | 17 Jan | −12 °C |

At Orleton, the maximum never got above −7.0 °C on the 25th. Rivers in the area had frozen over by the 15th.

Boston: 15 days the mean temp was −6.1 °C, 6.5 inches thick ice on river.

Haverfordwest: River Cleddan frozen over. A maximum of −7.8 °C on the 20th.

Killaloe: Large part of Lough Derg frozen over.

An aurora was widely seen over the UK on the 31st.

== Reports from counties of snow depths ==
From the Wirral to just north of Flamborough Head northwards, no snow fell from this storm although there was a deep cover of snow over a wide area. For instance, parts of the Lancashire plain had a general cover of 6 inches.

| County | Snow/inches | Notes |
|---|---|---|
| Norfolk | 9 | |
| Suffolk | 2-7 | 2-3 inches along the coast up to 7 inches in west |
| Essex | 6-9 | |
| Cambridgeshire | 7 | |
| Bedfordshire | 7 | 10 foot drifts |
| Huntingdonshire | 5-8 | |
| Northamptonshire | 6 | SW of county 12 inches |
| Oxfordshire | 12-13 | |
| Buckinghamshire | 12 | |
| Hertfordshire | 6-9 | |
| London/Middlesex | 9 | Snow started falling around 9 am on the 18th and lasted until about midday on the 19th. It was accompanied by a violent gale. |
| Kent | 3-7 | 3 to 4 inches along coast, 4-6 inches inland, 7 inches nearer London. 14 feet drifts on the Isle of Thanet. |
| Sussex | 7-24 | 7-8 inches to the north. 24 inches at Worthing, 18 inches at Brighton, 12 inches at St Leonard's, 9 to 12 inches at Littlehampton |
| Isle of Wight and south Hampshire | 18-34 | A staggering 34 inches in two falls at Newport on Isle of Wight. St Lawrence with 22 inches, Osborne and Ventnor with 18 inches and 24 inches at Ryde. Many roads were filled with snow up to halfway on lamp-posts. 12 feet drifts at Cowes. A hall collapsed at Portsmouth due to weight of snow |
| Berkshire | 9-15 | Ranging from 9 inches to east up to 15 inches in west |
| Wiltshire | 6-36 | 6 inches at Calne, 36 inches at Warminster. 12 feet drifts. |
| Dorset | 12-20 | 12-14 inches inland, 18 to 20 inches along coast |
| Devonshire | 12-14 | 12 to 14 inches generally, 3 feet over Dartmoor. 15 feet drifts. |
| Cornwall | 7-12 | 12 inches in far east, 7 inches generally. |
| Somerset | 8-13 | 12 to 13 inches in the south and east, 8 to 10 inches in west and north |
| Gloucestershire | 6-10 | 9 to 10 inches in south, 6 to 7 inches in north. 7 to 10 feet drifts. |
| Herefordshire | 6-11 | 10 to 11 inches in south, 6 inches in the north. |
| Shropshire | 3-5 | 3 inches in the north, 5 inches in the south. |
| Staffordshire | 1-4 | |
| Worcestershire | 5-6 | |
| Warwickshire | 4-12 | 4 inches in north, 7 to 8 inches over central parts, 12 inches in SE of county. |
| Leicestershire | 6 | 6 foot drifts |
| Lincolnshire | 6-7 | |
| South Wales | 6-9 | About 6 inches with 9 inches around Monmouthshire. |
| Radnorshire | 15 | |
| Denbighshire | 6 | |

=== Specific towns and cities reports ===
| City | Snow/Inches |
|---|---|
| Andover | 12 |
| Basingstoke | 4 |
| Barnstaple | 36 |
| Dorchester | 36 |
| Exeter | 12 |
| Fareham | 30 |
| Guildford | 8 |
| Havant | 36 |
| Lidford | 15 |
| Okehampton | 36 |
| Plymouth | 18 |
| Portsmouth | 30 |
| Ringwood | 36 |
| Salisbury | 9 |
| Southampton | 12 |
| Tottenham | 8 |
