= George Morrow (illustrator) =

Irish cartoonist and book illustrator (1869–1955)

- Self portrait (1920)
- Born: 5 September 1869; Belfast, Ireland
- Died: 18 January 1955 (aged 85); Thaxted, Essex, England
- Known for: Cartooning, illustration

George Morrow (5 September 1869 – 18 January 1955) was an Irish cartoonist and book illustrator.

== Early life and education ==
George Morrow was born in Belfast. He was the son of George Morrow, a painter and decorator from Clifton Street in west Belfast, and his wife Catherine. George was the fifth of 8 children, with five of his siblings, Albert, Jack, George, Edwin and Norman also working as artists. In April 1905 Morrow married a Dublin nurse, Mary Matilda McCracken at Ballyclare Presbyterian Church. Morrow attended the Belfast Government School of Art, graduating in 1891.

== Life and works ==
Morrow contributed one work to an exhibition with the Belfast Rambler's Sketching Club in 1888 and four paintings to the Belfast Art Society exhibition in 1893. From the mid to late 1890s he lived at 324 King's Road in Chelsea, where he made the acquaintance of Mark Twain. In 1896 Morrow showed a watercolour from Rudyard Kipling's book Strange Ride of Morrowby Jukes, in the Empire exhibition at the Earl's Court. In the same year he was published in Pick-Me-Up and Mary Russell Mitford's Country Stories.

George and his brother Albert were instrumental in the formation of the Ulster Arts Club in 1902. Both showed with three other brothers in the club's first exhibition alongside John Lavery, Hans Iten and FW Hull, at Fisherwick Place Belfast in November 1903. George Morrow exhibited three oil paintings, Donaghadee, Flaxpool, and The Geraldine's Daughter. Morrow exhibited one oil painting entitled The Saint of the Island at the Royal Academy of Arts summer exhibition of 1904.

In 1905 he contributed to the Ulster Literary Theatre's short-lived Ulad magazine and in the following year was published in the first edition of the equally short-lived Shanachie. In 1906 he sat on the committee of the first Oireachtas Art Exhibition with Jack Butler Yeats and Sarah Purser, and in the following year he showed two works at the Oireachtas exhibition of 1907. Morrow contributed a picture showing a complacent John Bull squatting in the home of peasants, to Bulmer Hobson's separatist magazine The Republic in 1906, which was later distributed as a postcard for the Dungannon Clubs.

More significantly the year 1906 marked the beginning of Morrow's long association with Punch. In 50 years Morrow was to contribute 2,704 cartoons to the publication, of which 22 were full-page political cartoons. He joined the staff of the magazine in 1924 and was appointed art editor in 1932, a position he held until 1937. Morrow then retired as editor and was succeeded by 'Fougasse'. In 1940 Morrow returned to the magazine to fill the position of assistant literary editor due to the staff shortages of WW2. Other publications he contributed to included the Bystander, The Pall Mall Magazine, Sphere, Strand Magazine, Tatler, Windsor Magazine and the Radio Times.

In 1908 Morrow and his brothers, Albert, Henry, Jack, Edwin and Norman, held an exhibition at the family business of 15 D'Olier Street in Dublin which consisted of seventy-three works, with several paintings by George, including Whitehead, Co.Antrim and Donaghadee. Snoddy speculates that this was at the launch of the business.

Morrow was a founder of the Society of Humorous Art and was represented at the inaugural exhibition in 1912, alongside W Heath Robinson. By 1917 George Morrow was a household name when he joined his brother Albert, and 150 artists and writers, in petitioning the British Prime Minister Lloyd George to find a way of enacting the unsigned codicil to Hugh Lane's will and establish a gallery to house Lane's art collection in Dublin. Amongst the 32 notable artists who signed this petition were Jack B Yeats, Sir William Orpen, Sir John Lavery, and Augustus John.

Morrow also designed posters for London Underground between the years 1918 to 1931. Morrow donated a picture of a mounted knight confronting a cheerful dragon upon an invitation from the Ulster Society for the Prevention of Cruelty to Animals for inclusion in their centenary publication. The volume is a virtual who's-who of Ulster artists, writers and musicians of the time. Morrow's work was later displayed in 1945 in a solo exhibition of 100 Punch drawings at the Belfast Museum and Art Gallery.

For many years Morrow produced Royal Academy Depressions, a series of comic parodies of Royal Academy pictures. Several collections of his cartoons were published including An Alphabet of the War (1915) which reprinted cartoons from Punch Almanack. He also illustrated more than 70 books by other authors for adults and children. He collaborated in producing 12 books with EV Lucas, who was the editor of Punch from 1932 to 1949. Their best loved title was the satirical life story of a fictional English aristocrat, What a Life! An Autobiography published in 1911. Morrow also had a number of books published by Methuen, under his own name -George Morrow: His Book (1920), More Morrow (1921) and Some More (1928). RGG Price referred to Morrow as,

"...a cheerful Bohemian Irishman[...] Morrow in his prime, which lasted much longer than with most humorous artists, could draw a simple little figure with a face that was funny per se [...] his versatility and his variety make some of the later draughtsmen look tired and repetitive."

Morrow lived most of his adult life in London, although he spent many summers painting watercolours in Ireland, mainly in County Donegal.

== Death and legacy ==
Morrow had no children and died at his home in Thaxted, Essex on 18 January 1955 aged 85, one month after his last cartoon appeared in Punch.

His work is to be found in the collections of the Ulster Museum, Linen Hall Library, Royal Albert Memorial Museum, Manchester City Art Gallery, the Science Museum, the Wellcome Collection, London Transport Museum, and the British Museum.

== Partial bibliography ==
- Change for a Halfpenny (1905) (online version)
- The Game of Ju-Jitsu (1906), by Taro Miyake and Yukio Tani
- What a Life! (1911, with E. V. Lucas)
- The House of the Ogress (1921), by W. E. Cule
- Elnovia (1925)
- Cinderella's Garden (1927)
- Chuckles (1927)
- The Marvellous Land of Snergs (1927)
- Simple People (1928), by Archibald Marshall
- Here Be Dragons (1930)
- Light Articles Only (1939), by A. P. Herbert
- The Birdikin Family (1932), by Archibald Marshall
