= Prosthetics in fiction =

Prosthetics, artificial replacements for organic limbs or organs, have appeared in fiction since at least the 1800s.

Early fictional characters, such as Captain Ahab and his ivory leg from Moby-Dick and Captain Hook and his hook for a hand, have prostheses that are inferior substitutes. More recent science fiction characters—for example Steve Austin, the Six Million Dollar Man, and his female counterpart, Jamie Summers, the Bionic Woman, with their multiple prostheses, and the inhabitants of William Gibson's cyberpunk universe—have ones that give them more-than-human abilities.

== See also ==
- Cyborgs in fiction
