= The Marvellous Land of Snergs =

1927 novel by E. A. Wyke-Smith

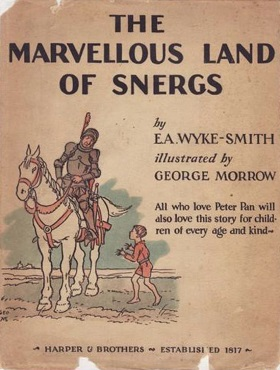
- First edition (US)
- Author: Edward Wyke-Smith
- Illustrator: George Morrow
- Language: English
- Genre: Children's novel, Fantasy literature
- Publisher: Ernest Benn (UK); Harper & Brothers
- Publication date: September 1927
- Publication place: United States
- Pages: 218 (first edition)
- OCLC: 504683286
- LC Class: PZ7.W9747

The Marvellous Land of Snergs is a children's fantasy, written by Edward Wyke-Smith and illustrated by the Punch cartoonist George Morrow. It was originally published in Britain by Ernest Benn in September 1927, and later published in the U.S. in 1928 by Harper & Brothers. It is notable as an inspiration source for J. R. R. Tolkien's The Hobbit.

== Plot summary ==
The Marvellous Land of Snergs is set on a fictional island somewhere on Earth, but difficult to reach. On the island is a colony of children (rescued from neglect by the redoubtable Miss Watkyns), the crew of the Flying Dutchman, and the Snergs, a race of short, thick-set, helpful people. Unfortunately Golithos, a reformed (but relapsing) ogre, and Mother Meldrum, a wicked witch, also live there. Also in the forest across the river there are tigers, brown bears, European dragons, ghouls, and unicorns. When Sylvia and Joe run away for a big adventure their lives are in deadly peril when they fall into the clutches of Golithos and Mother Meldrum. Gorbo the Snerg and Baldry the court jester come to the rescue.

== Snergs and Hobbits ==
J. R. R. Tolkien, author of The Hobbit and The Lord of the Rings, is known to have read The Marvellous Land of Snergs to his children. He said: "I should like to record my own love and my children's love of E. A. Wyke-Smith's Marvellous Land of Snergs, at any rate of the snerg-element of that tale, and of Gorbo the gem of dunderheads, jewel of a companion in an escapade."

The similarities between the races of snergs and hobbits have led to speculation that the book was a major inspiration. They are similar in their physical descriptions, their love of communal feasting, and their names, particularly Gorbo and Bilbo. In all the books there are also journeys through dangerous forests and caverns.

== Reviews ==
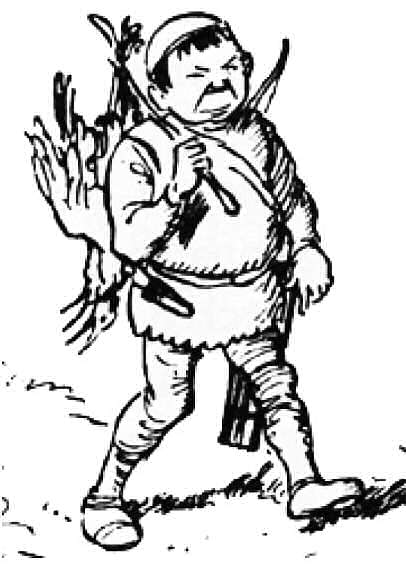
A Snerg with a bow and arrows. The book is seen by Tolkien scholars as an influence on Tolkien's hobbits.

The review in The Tolkien Collector notes the points of similarity with Peter Pan – a remote island populated by disparate groups – and Alice's Adventures in Wonderland – a haphazard plot and fantastic creatures. It criticizes the inconsistencies in the island story and the stylistic flaws which come from an over-awareness of the child audience, but considers that "Wyke-Smith transcends such superficial, dreamlike stories by creating a true fairy story, along the lines that were later elucidated by Tolkien". David Bratman, reviewing for the Mythopoeic Society, calls the book a "long and discursive novel, lacking the clear-cut structure and tight plotting of The Hobbit," but says it nonetheless is "an intriguing book that well deserves this resurrection from the dusty out-of-print shelves."
