= Holly Ordway =

Cultural Apologist

- Education: University of Massachusetts Amherst (BA, 1995; PhD, 2011); University of North Carolina at Chapel Hill (MA, 1997); Biola University (MA, 2011)
- Occupations: Author; academic; Tolkien scholar; cultural apologist
- Employer(s): Word on Fire Institute, Houston Christian University
- Notable work: Apologetics and the Christian Imagination: An Integrated Approach to Defending the Faith (2017); Tolkien's Modern Reading (2021); Tolkien's Faith: A Spiritual Biography (2023)
- Title: Cardinal Francis George Professor of Faith and Culture
- Awards: Mythopoeic Scholarship Award in Inklings Studies (2022)

Holly Ordway is an American author, Tolkien scholar, and academic. She serves as the Cardinal Francis George Professor of Faith and Culture at the Word on Fire Institute and is a Visiting Professor of Apologetics at Houston Christian University. She previously served as the founding Chair of the Department of Apologetics and Director of the Master of Arts in Apologetics program at HCU, where she architected the program's foundational curriculum. She won a 2022 Mythopoeic Award for her book Tolkien's Modern Reading: Middle-earth Beyond the Middle Ages.

== Life ==
Holly Ordway gained her bachelor's degree in English at the University of Massachusetts Amherst in 1995. She took an MA in English at the University of North Carolina at Chapel Hill, in 1997, and completed her PhD in English back at the University of Massachusetts Amherst in 2011. In 2005 she joined the faculty at MiraCosta College, Oceanside, California, teaching English literature. She took a further MA in Christian Apologetics at Biola University in 2011.

In 2012, Ordway was recruited by Houston Christian University Provost John Mark Reynolds to help found the university's new graduate program in apologetics, alongside Mary Jo Sharp and Nancy Pearcey. Rather than teaching in the English department, Ordway served as a leader in the Department of Apologetics, where she architected the practical structure of the Master of Arts in Apologetics (MAA) curriculum. She pioneered a unique hybrid online model for the university, using digital tools to facilitate intimate, global seminars, and was personally responsible for recruiting Oxford Tolkien and Lewis scholar Michael Ward to the HCU faculty.

Since 2010, when she became a Christian while already a lecturer, Ordway has published several books on Christian apologetics, and two on the Roman Catholic novelist J. R. R. Tolkien.

Ordway fenced competitively for twenty years; she gave up after becoming a Christian.

== Awards and distinctions ==
In 2021, Michael Ward and others published An Unexpected Journal: The Imaginative Harvest of Holly Ordway: Celebrating the Difference a Teacher Can Make about Ordway.

In 2022, Ordway won a Mythopoeic Scholarship Award in Inklings Studies for her book Tolkien's Modern Reading: Middle-earth Beyond the Middle Ages.

== Books ==
Written

- Ordway, Holly (2010). Not God's Type: A Rational Academic Finds a Radical Faith. Moody Publishers. ISBN 978-157567936-5. (revised ed., Ignatius Press, 2014)
- ————— (2017). Apologetics and the Christian Imagination: an integrated approach to defending the faith. Living Faith. ISBN 978-1-945125-38-6.
- ————— (2022). Tales of Faith: A Guide to Sharing the Gospel through Literature. Word on Fire.
- ————— (2021). Tolkien's Modern Reading: Middle-earth Beyond the Middle Ages. Word on Fire. ISBN 978-1-943243-72-3.
- ————— (2023). Tolkien's Faith: a Spiritual Biography. Word on Fire. ISBN 978-1-68578-991-6.

Edited

- Ordway, Holly, ed. (2023). As Kingfishers Catch Fire: Selected and Annotated Poems of Gerard Manley Hopkins. Word on Fire.

== Reception ==
=== Not God's Type ===
Janet Brennan Croft notes that Ordway's apologetics may interest Mythlore readers, as Ordway credits the Inkling authors Tolkien and C. S. Lewis for her conversion from being an atheist to a Roman Catholic.

Hannah Bitner, for The Christian Librarian, writes that as a child, Ordway longed to immerse herself in the imagined worlds of Anne McCaffrey and Gene Roddenberry. The joy of these worlds faded, but that of Tolkien did not, even though Ordway was an atheist, unwilling to accept the Christianity behind Middle-earth. She became a Catholic when a Christian friend enabled her "to see The Lord of the Rings and The Chronicles of Narnia with fresh eyes."

=== Tolkien's Modern Reading ===
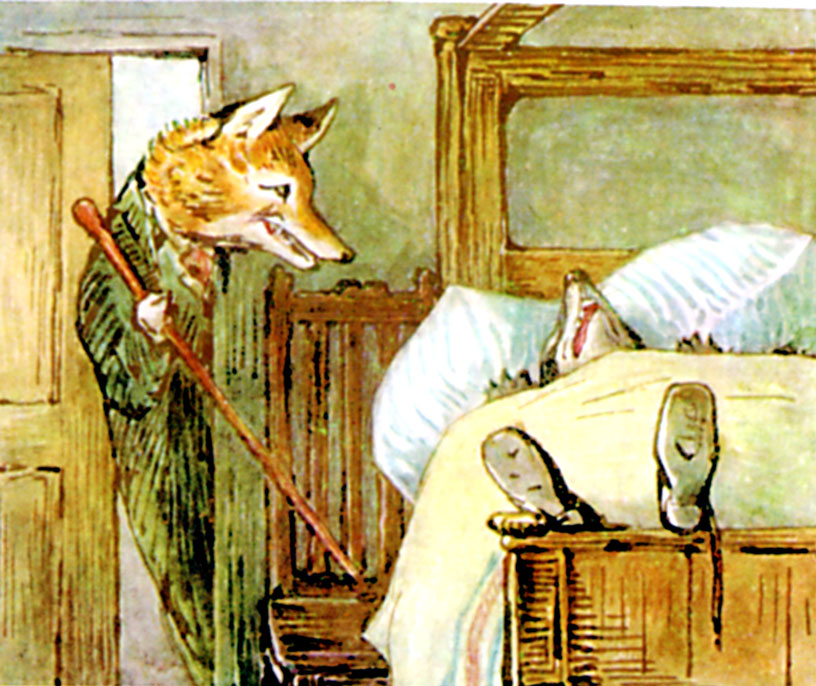
In Maureen Mann's view, Ordway notes that Tolkien gave a "nod" to Beatrix Potter's "dark and ruthless animal fantasy", without explaining what effect it might have had on Tolkien. Painting by Potter in The Tale of Mr. Tod, 1912.

Maureen Mann, responding to Tolkien's Modern Reading in Journal of Tolkien Research, called it "a surprising book", presenting authors that he had read "in some unexpected ways". Mann was surprised in particular by the "polemical style of rhetoric", including an "extended diatribe" against Tolkien's official biographer, Humphrey Carpenter. Further, Mann considers that Ordway has made an "exaggerated claim" to be the first to study "Tolkien's interest in modern literature". Mann acknowledges Ordway's "substantial" research, and finds "valuable" the study of children's books read by Tolkien: she notes that, like fantasy, the area has often been "dismissed in ... scholarly study". She wonders what Tolkien's "nod" to Beatrix Potter's "dark and ruthless animal fantasy" might mean, mere homage not being the only possibility. On authors of adult fiction mentioned later in the book, Mann writes that many are merely listed, and that Ordway does not attempt to show that they influenced "the Middle-earth works or Tolkien's creative imagination" in any way. Mann suggests that "Not everything identified in this article is necessarily attributable to her [Christian] apologetics, but many things can be." Mann concludes that Ordway has the ambition to establish "a new narrative about Tolkien the man, the growth of the writer's mind". In Mann's view, Ordway's "polemical method tarnishes her work" and crosses the boundary "between literary criticism and apologetics".

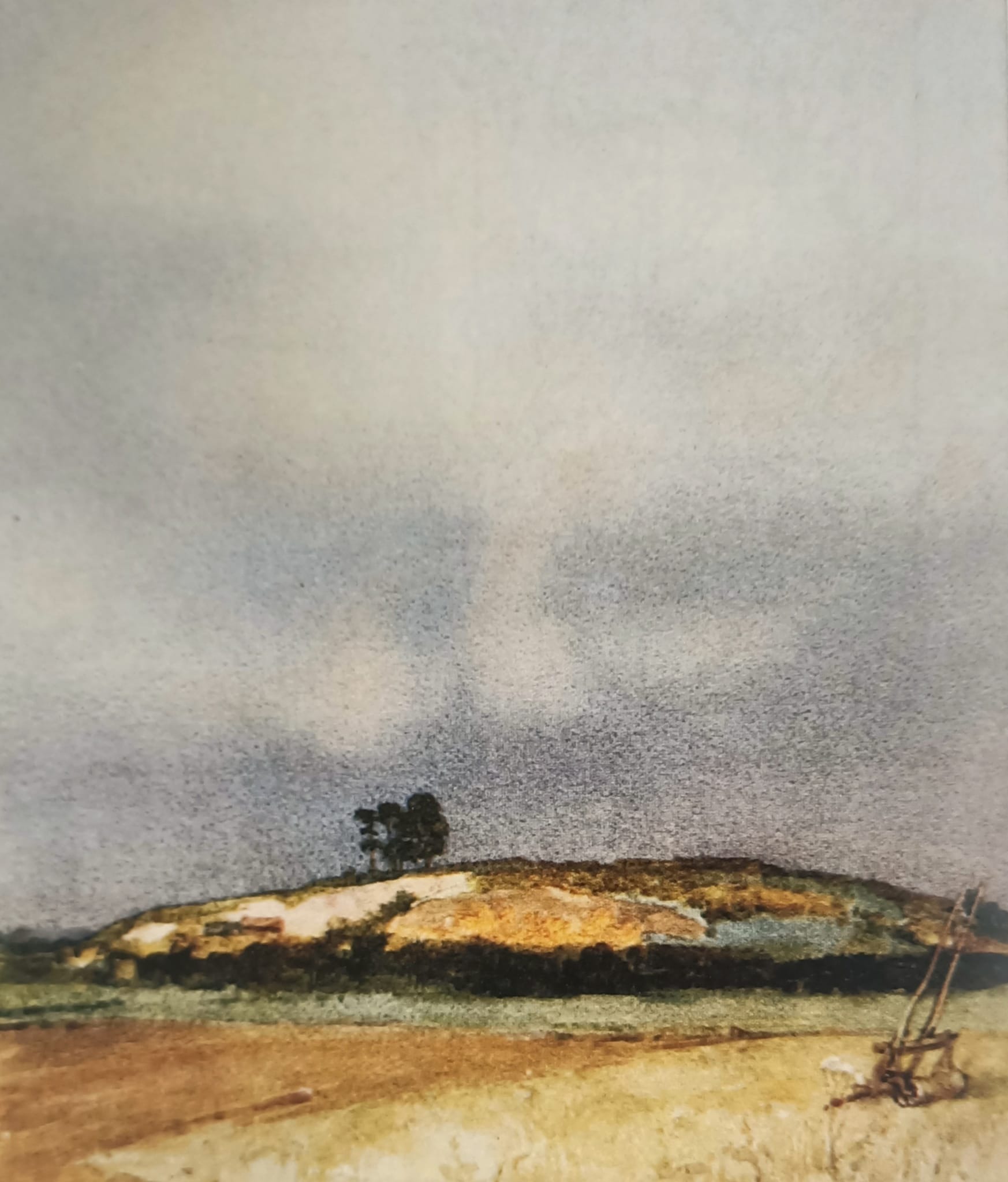
Ordway suggests that Tolkien's painting of the Shire, The Hill: Hobbiton-across-the-Water, derives from The Fir-Topped Hurst by William Russell Flint, 1910 (pictured). However, Tolkien's painting closely resembles a 1936 advertisement.

Kris Swank, reviewing the book for Mythlore, praises Ordway for her "deep dive into sources" and for studying just a specific period (after 1850) and only books Tolkien certainly "read, owned, or mentioned", but regrets the book's limited fact-checking. Swank finds some claims of resemblance "unsubstantiated, such as Tolkien's and G. K. Chesterton's uses of the word "shire". Swank agrees there is "some similarity" between Tolkien's painting The Hill: Hobbiton-across-the-Water and William Russell Flint's The Fir-Topped Hurst. Ordway notes that Tolkien took a print of this from Matthew Arnold's 1910 book The Scholar Gipsy & Thyrsis and framed it. Swank observes however that John Garth has shown its close resemblance to Shell Oil's 1936 advertisement which depicts Faringdon Folly. Otherwise, Swank writes, Ordway's conclusions will not come as "news to Tolkien scholars", though they may be of interest to fans. The claim that Tolkien was significantly influenced by his modern reading was, Swank notes, demonstrated by Anna Vaninskaya in 2006, and by Ralph C. Wood in 2015. On the other hand, Swank endorses at least part of Ordway's "welcome corrective to Humphrey Carpenter's outsized effect over Tolkien biography."

=== Tolkien's Faith ===
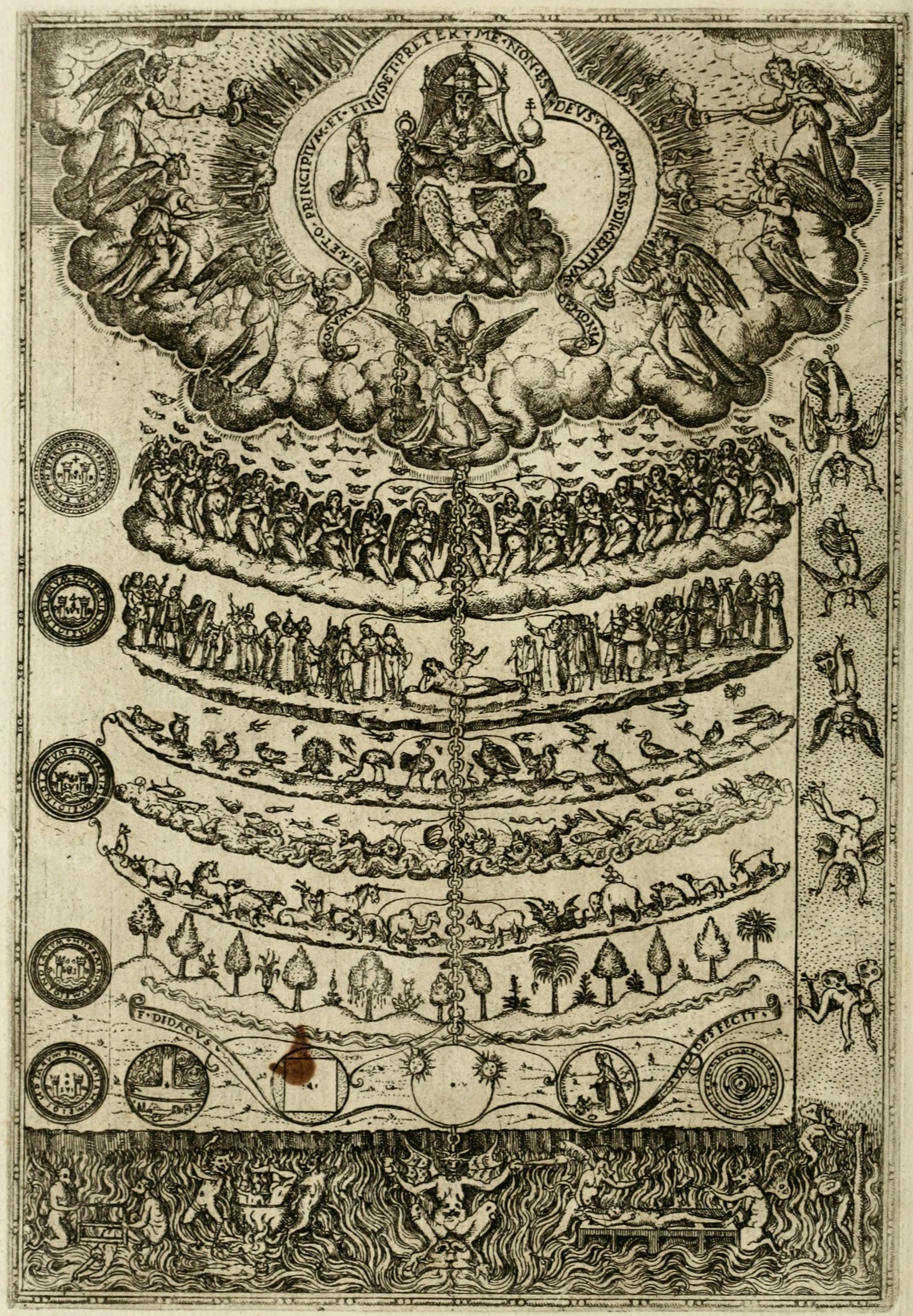
In Tom Emanuel's view, Tolkien's attitude to race reflected the great chain of being, a medieval Christian view with fixed categories of "higher" and "lower" beings, but Ordway had ignored this.

Steven Umbrello, in Literature and Theology, writes that Ordway "rigorous[ly] explor[es] Tolkien's spiritual development" to uncover how his faith influenced his writing. He writes that the biography provides "a holistic view of the man behind Middle-earth", incorporating evidence from Tolkien's letters, unpublished documents, and "the socioreligious context of his time". In Umbrello's view, the book "neither critiques nor endorses Tolkien's religious beliefs but presents them with an academic rigor that allows readers to form their [own] interpretations."

The Protestant minister Tom Emanuel, in Journal of Tolkien Research, writes that Ordway's earlier book, Tolkien's Modern Reading, gave him the strong impression that she was frustrated with Carpenter's depiction of Tolkien as "a staunch anti-modernist". Emanuel was therefore not as surprised as Ordway was that she would write a "Roman Catholic biography" of the author, in which she states up front that earlier scholarship played down Tolkien's faith, and her work is meant to counterbalance that, indeed to show that his faith was as he had indicated "central to his identity". She adds that she is writing a "work of biography, not a[n all-positive] hagiography". Emanuel writes that Ordway's intention already "expresses a particular perspective", assuming there is "only one kind of Catholicism", and opposing a major theme of both Carpenter and Verlyn Flieger: " that even as he was a staunch Roman Catholic, Tolkien was also [a] man of paradoxes, and it is his dynamic tensions which power his literary art." Emanuel notes that Tolkien's friend, the Jesuit priest Robert Murray, cautioned that he "could not support an interpretation" which set Tolkien's Catholic faith as "the key to everything". Emanuel comments that Dimitra Fimi warned in her book Tolkien, Race and Cultural History that it was not safe to take Tolkien's own word about himself, since he was building a "biographical legend" to place literary criticism of himself in the frame he wanted.

Emanuel writes that he "actually agree[s] with Ordway" that subjectivity on religion is inevitable, and it can be productive. He finds it so in parts of Ordway's book, where she has found aspects of Tolkien's life "which a non-Catholic would miss"; and he notes the "painstaking research" into Tolkien's time at the Birmingham Oratory from 1904 onwards. But he observes that Ordway does not consider whether the Oratory, and Father Francis Morgan's guardianship, was necessarily always "perfectly benign". He comments, too, that Ordway seemingly intentionally ignores evidence of anti-Protestant prejudice. She largely avoids the question of Tolkien's attitude to race, complete with higher and lower "human-like beings" on the lines of the medieval great chain of being, a matter clearly related to his faith. In Emanuel's view, the book largely fails "to acknowledge the wider social and political valences of Tolkien's faith." He expresses "enormous sympathy" for Ordway and her feeling that The Lord of the Rings was for her "the Roman Catholic work of imaginative apologetics par excellence". He interprets her biography of Tolkien as "an attempt to lead others" to the Catholic faith, whether consciously intended as such or not. Was Tolkien then "a plaster saint" for Ordway? She replies to that "No. A complex, fascinating, flawed, devout, funny and brilliant man"; in other words, Emanuel concludes, Tolkien was to Ordway a genuine saint; and the book is, despite Ordway's statement to the contrary, a hagiography.

The Catholic priest Juan R. Vélez, in The Downside Review, writes that Ordway proposes numerous possible sources for events in The Lord of the Rings from Tolkien's personal experiences, giving as an example the way that the protagonist Frodo Baggins's act of mercy to the monster Gollum "is repaid": Gollum turns out to be essential to the destruction of the One Ring. Ordway likens this to the adolescent Tolkien's learning of forgiveness from Father Francis Morgan.

== Sources ==
- Tolkien, J. R. R. (1955). The Return of the King. The Lord of the Rings. Boston: Houghton Mifflin. OCLC 519647821.
