= Joseph Henry Shorthouse =

English novelist (1834–1903)

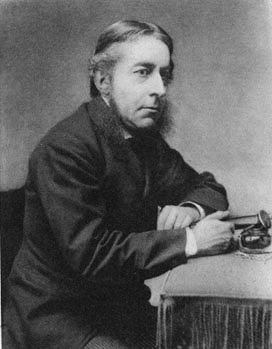
- Born: 9 September 1834; Birmingham, England
- Died: 4 March 1903 (aged 68)
- Education: Grove School, Tottenham

Joseph Henry Shorthouse (9 September 1834 – 4 March 1903) was an English novelist. His first novel, John Inglesant, was particularly admired as a "philosophical romance". It discusses a religious intrigue in the English 17th century.

== Biography ==
Shorthouse was born in Great Charles Street, Birmingham, on 9 September 1834, as the eldest of three sons of Joseph Shorthouse (1797–1880) and his wife, Mary Ann, née Hawker. He grew up in Calthorpe Street, Edgbaston. His father had inherited a family chemical works manufacturing vitriol, and his mother's father had founded the first glasshouse in Birmingham. Both families were Quakers. He was educated partly at home and partly at Grove House School, Tottenham, and became a chemical manufacturer.

At the Friends meeting house in Warwick on 19 August 1857, he married a childhood friend, Sarah Scott (1832–1909), the eldest daughter of John and Elizabeth Scott. Two events of importance ensued. He and his wife joined the Church of England in 1861, and he had the first of many attacks of epilepsy in January 1862. Shorthouse later identified himself with "the new Oxford school of High Churchmen", but he preferred the freedom and reason of the Anglican church to the authority over private judgement that he saw exercised by Roman Catholicism.

Shorthouse's health began to deteriorate in 1900 and he died at his home, 60 Wellington Road, Edgbaston, on 4 March 1903. He left no children.

== John Inglesant ==
Shorthouse spent ten years up to 1876 working on his first book, John Inglesant, which initially appeared privately. It was eventually noticed by Mrs Humphry Ward and through her intervention by Alexander Macmillan, who published it commercially in 1881. A story of 17th-century religious intrigue and faith, it hinges on a man who fights on the Royalist side in the Civil War, moves between Anglican and Catholic circles, and forgives the man who murdered his brother. However, as an encyclopedist notes, "Its revenge plot – in which Inglesant pursues his brother's murderer – is less important than the hero's spiritual journey and assertion of the claims of the Anglican Church."

The book at once made Shorthouse famous. Though said to be deficient in its structure as a story and unappealing to the general public, it fascinated people by the charm of its style, by a "dim religious light", with which it was suffused, and by occasional striking scenes. More recently it has been described as "one of the best examples of the philosophical romance in English literature".

Shorthouse dedicated John Inglesant to Rawdon Levett, his friend and fellow teacher at King Edward's School, Birmingham. Other admirers of the work included T. H. Huxley, Charlotte Yonge and Edmund Gosse. He was invited to breakfast at 10 Downing Street by the Prime Minister, Gladstone. The book sold 9000 copies in its first year.

== Other works ==
Shorthouse's other novels, The Little Schoolmaster Mark (1883), Sir Percival (1886), The Countess Eve (1888), A Teacher of the Violin (1888) and Blanche, Lady Falaise (1891) have some of the same characteristics, but were less successful than the first. Shorthouse also wrote literary essays, including one called "The Platonism of Wordsworth".

The Life, Letters, and Literary Remains of J. H. Shorthouse were edited by the author's wife and published in 1905. A biographical study of Shorthouse appeared in 1995.
