= Liebrecht =

Liebrecht is a surname. Notable people with the surname include:

- Torben Liebrecht (born 1977), German actor
- Jason Liebrecht, American voice actor
- Felix Liebrecht (1812–1890), German folklorist
- Kurt Liebrecht (1936–2022), German footballer
- Savyon Liebrecht, Israeli writer
- Coenraad Liebrecht Temminck Groll, Dutch architect, historian, and conservator
