= Brown Man of the Muirs =

Cryptid in the folklore of the UK

In the folklore on the Anglo-Scottish border, the Brown Man of the Muirs is a dwarf who serves as a guardian spirit of wild animals. There is also a folklore story, called "Brown Man of the Moor" in the Richardson's table book from the 19th century according to Publications of the Folklore Society of North England, which features the creatures such as boggleboes, bogies, redmen, portunes, grants, hobbits, hobgoblins and brown men.

== Folklore ==
William Henderson provides an account of the Brown Man and a pair of hunters in Folklore of the Northern Counties (1879), taken from a letter sent by the historian Robert Surtees to Sir Walter Scott:

In the year before the Great Rebellion two young men from Newcastle were sporting on the high moors above Elsdon, and at last sat down to refresh themselves in a green glen near a mountain stream. The younger lad went to drink at the brook, and raising his head again saw the "Brown man of the Muirs", a dwarf very strong and stoutly built, his dress brown like withered bracken, his head covered with frizzled red hair, his countenance ferocious, and his eyes glowing like those of a bull. After some parley, in which the stranger reproved the hunter for trespassing on his demesnes and slaying the creatures who were his subjects, and informed him how he himself lived only on whortleberries, nuts, and apples, he invited him home. The youth was on the point of accepting the invitation and springing across the brook, when he was arrested by the voice of his companion, who thought he had tarried long, and looking round again "the wee brown man was fled". It was thought that had the young man crossed the water the dwarf would have torn him to pieces. As it was he died within the year, in consequence, it was supposed, of his slighting the dwarf's admonition, and continuing his sport on the way home.

Walter Scott in a return letter to Surtees suggested that the Brown Man may be related to the duergar (dwarfs) of Northumberland.

== Fairy tales ==
In folklore the Brown Man appears as a solitary fairy, but in fairy tale literature he is a member of a tribe of similar beings. They once lived all over England and Scotland, but in the wake of human progress they dwindled in number and now live in a cave in Cumberland. Known as the Brown Men of the Moors and Mountains, they have great strength that allows them to hurl small boulders. By day they mine the mountains for gold and diamonds, and by night they feast in their underground hall or dance on the moors. They kidnap human children and kill any man they catch alone in the wilderness, but they can be made subservient by repeating the incantation, "Munko tiggle snobart tolwol dixy crambo".

== See also ==
- Brownie (folklore)
- Redcap
- Hobbit (word)
