= Rhetorica ad Herennium =

Ancient Latin book on rhetoric

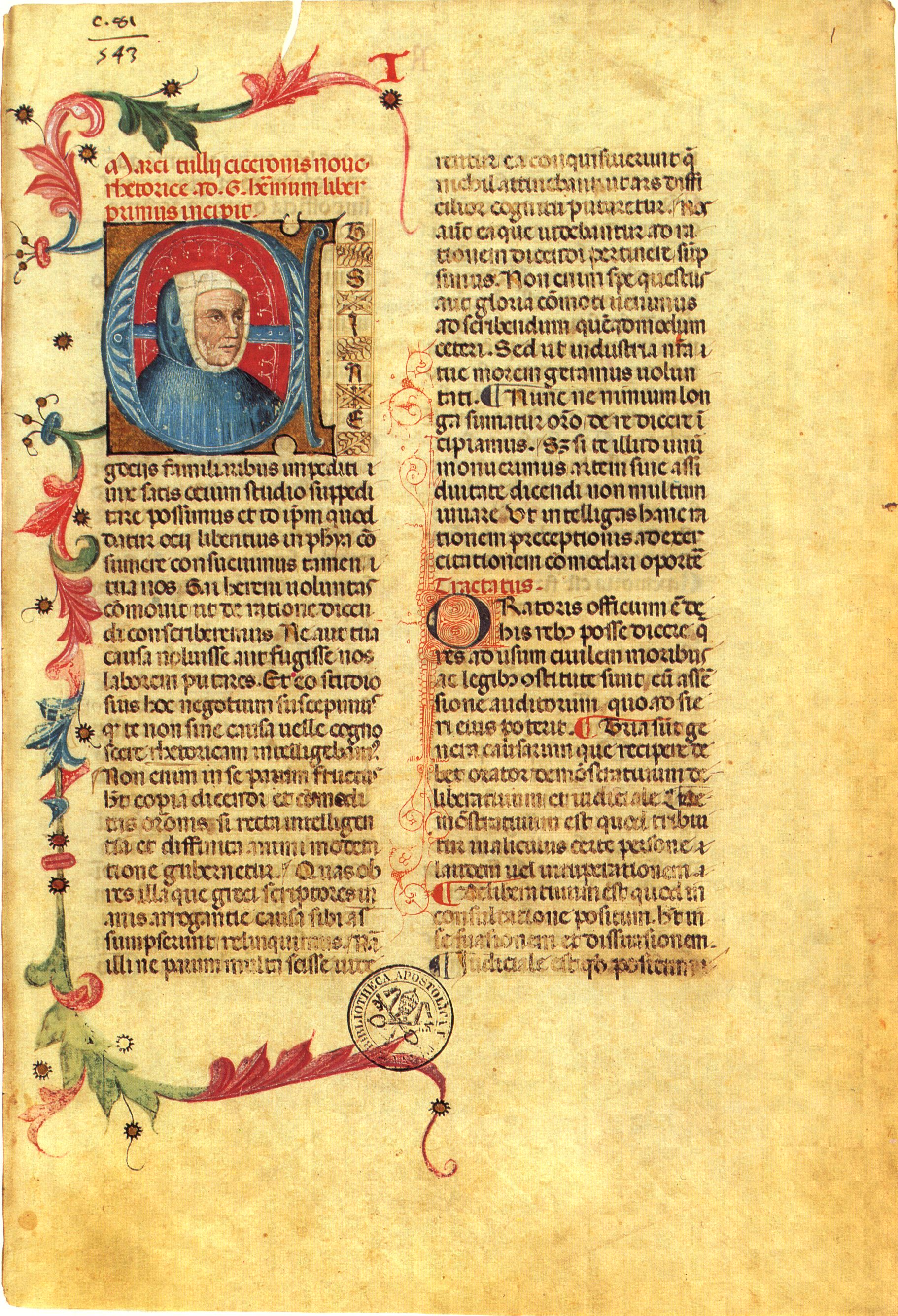
- Author: Cicero or Cornificius
- Language: Latin
- Subject: Rhetoric
- Set in: Ancient Rome
- Publication date: c. 90 BCE
- Publication place: Roman Empire

The Rhetorica ad Herennium (Rhetoric for Herennius) is the oldest surviving Latin book on rhetoric, dating from the late 80s BC. It was formerly attributed to Cicero or Cornificius, but is in fact of unknown authorship, sometimes ascribed to an unnamed doctor.

== Overview ==
The Rhetorica ad Herennium was addressed to Gaius Herennius (otherwise unknown). The Rhetorica remained the most popular book on rhetoric during the Middle Ages and the Renaissance. It was commonly used, along with Cicero's De Inventione, to teach rhetoric, and over one hundred manuscripts are extant. It was also translated extensively into European vernacular languages and continued to serve as the standard schoolbook text on rhetoric during the Renaissance. The work focuses on the practical applications and examples of rhetoric. It is also the first book to teach rhetoric in a highly structured and disciplined form.

Its discussion of elocutio (style) is the oldest surviving systematic treatment of Latin style, and many of the examples are of contemporary Roman events. This new style, which flowered in the century following this work's writing, promoted revolutionary advances in Roman literature and oratory. However, according to some analysts, teaching oratory in Latin was inherently controversial because oratory was seen as a political tool, which had to be kept in the hands of the Greek-speaking upper class. The Rhetorica ad Herennium can be seen as part of a liberal populist movement, carried forward by those, like Lucius Plotius Gallus, who was the first to open a school of rhetoric at Rome conducted entirely in Latin. He opened the school in 93 BCE. The work contains the first known description of the method of loci, a mnemonic technique. Ad Herennium also provides the first complete treatment of memoria (memorization of speeches).

According to the work, there are three types of causes that a speaker would address:

- Demonstrativum, where there is praise or condemnation of a particular person
- Deliberativum, where policy is discussed
- Iudiciale, where legal controversies are addressed

The Rhetorica ad Herennium suggests that in a standard format for argument there were six steps:

- Exordium, in which the writer uses relevant generalities, anecdotes, quotes, or analogies to capture attention and then connects them to the specific topic
- Narratio, in which the author succinctly states what will be the argument, thesis or point that is to be proven
- Divisio, in which the author outlines the main points, or reviews the debate to clarify what needs to be discussed further
- Confirmatio, which sets out the arguments (often three) for the thesis that the author supports as well as evidence supporting them
- Refutatio, which sets out and refutes the opposing arguments
- Conclusio, which is a summary of the argument, describing the urgency of the viewpoint and actions that could be taken

The Rhetorica ad Herennium divides oral rhetoric into three styles. Each style has traits that make it most effective for specific purposes in oration.

- Grand, a style using intricate arrangement of complex language
  The diction used is formal and impressive. The purpose of this style is to move an audience, either emotionally or to perform some action.
- Middle, a style using more relaxed language than the Grand style but not quite at the level of casual conversation
  It avoids using colloquialisms but is not overly formal. The Middle style's purpose is to please or entertain an audience.
- Simple, a style using ordinary speech common to everyday conversation
  It uses colloquialisms and informal language, and is best suited for instruction and explanation.

== Rhetorical figures from Book 4 ==
Book 4 of the Rhetorica ad Herennium's systematic treatment of Latin oratory style identifies two categories of rhetorical devices, or Figures. These are Figures of Diction, which are identifiable in the language itself, and Figures of Thought, which are derived from the ideas presented. Although these figures have been in use in rhetoric throughout history, the Rhetorica ad Herennium was the first text to compile them and discuss the effects they have on an audience. Many of the following figures described in Book 4 are still used in modern rhetoric, though they were originally intended specifically for use in oral debate.

The Figures of Diction include the following:

- Epanaphora, when the same word starts successive sentences
- Antistrophe, when the same word ends successive sentences
- Interlacement, when the previous two occur simultaneously
- Transplacement, when the same word is reused frequently

The repetition of the same word in these four figures produces an elegant and pleasant sound for the listener, rather than simply being repetitive.

- Antithesis is when the structure of the sentence is built upon contraries.
- Apostrophe expresses grief or resentment by addressing a specific person or object.
- Interrogation reinforces an argument by asking the opposition a series of rhetorical questions after they have presented their case, while reasoning by question and answer involves asking and answering oneself the reasoning behind every statement made.

These figures use conversational style to hold the audience's attention.

- A maxim is a saying that concisely shows what happens in life and therefore ought to happen as it applies to the situation the speaker is talking about.
- Reasoning by contraries uses one statement to prove an opposite statement.
- Colon or clause is when a series of up to three brief but complete clauses are strung together to communicate an entire thought; it is called isocolon when the clauses have an equal number of syllables.
- Similar to this is the comma or phrase, where single words are split up in a sentence to give it a halting, staccato sound.

Both these figures create emphasis on the independent words or clauses within the entire thought; Period is the opposite, in which words in a sentence are close-packed and uninterrupted to form a complete thought.

- Homoeoptoton occurs when two or more words in the same sentence are in the same case with the same ending;
- in contrast, homoeoteleuton features words without inflection that have the same ending.
- Paronomasia (a term often treated as a formal term for a pun) changes a sound or a letter in a word to make it sound similar to another word with a different meaning; these three figures are most relevant in highly inflected languages with cases like Latin, and the Rhetorica ad Herennium states they are best used in speeches of entertainment.
- Hypophora occurs in debate when the speaker asks himself or his opponent what points can be made against his case or in favor of the opponent's, then uses the response (whether his own or his opponent's) to attack the position of the opponent.
- Climax is the repetition of a preceding word in the process of moving on to a new one. (An example is "The industry of Africanus brought him excellence, his excellence glory, his glory rivals.")
- Definition is the concise statement of a person or object's characteristic traits, transition restates a previous statement to set up the presentation of a new one, and correction is the deliberate retraction of a statement in order to replace it with a more fitting one. Paralipsis is best used as an indirect reference in a debate, it occurs when a speaker pretends to be passing or ignorant of points that are not relevant, when he is actually addressing them as points relevant to the discussion.

Disjunction happens when two or more clauses end in verbs with similar meanings, conjunction when the clauses are connected by one verb between them, and adjunction when the verb connecting the clauses is located at the beginning or end. The author groups these three figures together, stating that disjunction is best suited for limited use to convey elegance while one should use conjunction more frequently for its brevity.

Reduplication is the repetition of words for emphasis or an appeal to pity. Synonymy or Interpretation is similar to reduplication, only instead of repeating the same word it replaces it with a synonym. Reciprocal change is when two differing thoughts are arranged so that one follows the other despite the discrepancy (example: I do not write poems, because I cannot write the sort I wish, and I do not wish to write the sort I can). Surrender evokes pity by submitting to another's opinion on the topic. A speaker uses indecision by asking rhetorically which of two or more words he should use. Elimination lists multiple options or possibilities, and then systematically removes all except one of them, the point the speaker is arguing. Asyndeton is the presentation of concise clauses connected without conjunctions, which the Rhetorica ad Herennium claims creates animation and power in the speech. Aposiopesis occurs when a speaker deliberately does not finish a statement about his opponent, allowing suspicion of his opponent to settle in the audience. Conclusion identifies the necessary consequences or results of a previous statement.

The author distinguishes the last ten figures of diction from the rest. The common characteristic of these ten figures is the application of language beyond the strict meaning of the words. The first he identifies as Onomatopoeia, the term given for words assigned to sounds we cannot properly imitate with language, such as "hiss" or "roar." Antonomasia or pronomination is the use of an epithet when addressing a person or object in place of their proper name. Metonymy occurs when an object is referred to as something closely associated with it rather than its proper name. Periphrasis is the use of more words than are necessary to express a simple idea (example: "The steadiness of the tortoise defeated the impatience of the hare," rather than "The tortoise defeated the hare,"). Hyperbaton upsets the order of the words used. Hyperbole exaggerates the truth. Synecdoche occurs when a whole point is understood when only a small part is addressed. Catachresis is the use of an inexact but similar word in place of the proper one (example: The power of man is short). The author defines metaphor as the application of one object to another due to some indirect similarity, and allegory as the implication of multiple meanings to a phrase beyond the actual letter of the words used.

The Figures of Thought include: Distribution, which assigns specific roles to a number of objects or people in order to identify their place in the structure of the argument, and frankness of speech, in which the speaker exercises his right to speak freely despite the presence of superiors. Understatement occurs when a speaker downplays a particular advantage he might have over someone in order to avoid appearing arrogant. Vivid description describes the consequences of something with impressive and elaborate detail. Division separates all the possible causes of something, and then resolves them with reasoning that is connected. Accumulation is the connection of all the points made throughout an argument at the end of a speech, adding emphasis to the conclusion. Dwelling on the point is the continuous repetition of the same point, while refining disguises dwelling on the same topic by continuously saying the same thing in new ways. Dialogue is used as a figure of thought when the speaker puts words in the mouth of his opponent for the sake of rhetorical conversation to illustrate his point. Comparisons point out similar traits in different people or objects, while exemplification is the citing of something done in the past along with the name of the person or thing that did it. Portrayal identifies a person with a physical description rather than their name, while character delineation identifies a person with noticeable elements of their character or personality. Both of these figures allow the speaker to draw particular attentions to specific traits of that person. Personification assigns an inanimate object or an absent person traits to help the audience understand its character. Emphasis leaves more to be suspected about a topic than what is actually said, while conciseness is the precise expression of a thought using the least amount of language possible. Ocular demonstration is similar to vivid description, though the emphasis is on the visual elements of the scene described.

== Old French translation ==
At the request of William of Santo Stefano, the Rhetorica ad Herennium was translated into Old French by John of Antioch in 1282.

== See also ==
- Rhetorical operations
- Five paragraph essay
- Cicero, De Inventione
- Rhetorica ad Alexandrum
