= John of Antioch (translator) =

Thirteenth-century writer

The start of John's autograph manuscript of Cicero from 1282. The red text reads Ci comense le prologue que maistre Johan d'Anthioche fist ("Here begins the prologue that Master John of Antioch made").

John of Antioch, also known as Harent of Antioch, was a 13th-century Old French writer of Outremer who made important translations from Latin. He translated Cicero, Boethius, the Otia imperialia and possibly the rule of the Knights Hospitaller. His original writing consists of an epilogue to Cicero and some additional chapters appended to the Otia.

== Life ==
John was born in Antioch to a family of western European origin. There is no evidence that he ever attended university. He lived in Antioch before its conquest by the Mamlūks in 1268, after which he moved to Acre. He was attached to the Knights Hospitaller, probably as a priest at the main hospital in Acre. Some Italianisms in his translations suggest that his first language was Italian rather than French.

== Works ==
At the request of fellow Hospitaller William of Santo Stefano, (Note: The inspiration for William's request came from his native Lombardy, where vernacular Italian translations of De inventione and Rhetorica ad Herennium had been produced by Brunetto Latini and Guidotto da Bologna, respectively.) John translated Cicero's De inventione and the anonymous Rhetorica ad Herennium. At the time these works were considered two parts of a singular work of Cicero's on rhetoric. John's translation thus came under the title Rectorique de Marc Tulles Cyceron. (Note: It is sometimes spelled Rettorique. Elisa Guadagnini has produced an edition.) It was completed at Acre in 1282. (Note: The dates 1272 (MCCLXXII), 1282 (MCCLXXXII) and 1382 (MCCCLXXXII) are all found in the manuscript, but only the second corresponds to a time when William of Santo Stefano was in Acre.) The manuscript presented to William—now Chantilly, Musée Condé, MS fr. 433 (590)—also contains a preface, an epilogue on the methodology of translation and a treatise on logic. These parts may also have been completed at Acre in 1282 or perhaps a little later in Cyprus. The preface and the treatise on logic are in a different hand from the rest of the manuscript, which is probably in John's hand. The epilogue was written by John (and thus probably at Acre in 1282). The treatise on logic consists of excerpts from Boethius' De topicis differentiis, most likely translated but probably not selected by John.

John also translated Gervase of Tilbury's Otia imperialia from Latin into Old French. (Note: Cinzia Pignatelli and Dominique Gerner have produced an edition with a modern French translation. It should not be confused with the translation of Jean de Vignay, known under the title Oisivetez des empereurs.) This translation, now in Paris, Bibliothèque nationale de France, MS fr. 9113, is ascribed to "maystre Harent d'Antioche". Although doubt has been cast on the identity of this person with John, the Chantilly manuscript refers to the translator of the Rectorique as "Johan d’Anthioche, que l'en apele de Harens" ("who is called Harent") and there is no reason to doubt that they are one and the same. To Gervase's Otia he added five chapters of original material in Old French. In these he provides some of the best evidence that he was a man of the church, including several accounts of miracles. Gaston Paris placed the production of the translation of the Otia at Acre before 1287, and in one place precisely in 1285, but it is not certain it was made at Acre.

The influence of Brunetto Latini's Livres dou trésor is apparent in John's addenda to the Otia. These five additional chapters rely heavily on chapters 82–98 of the first book of Brunetto's Trésor as completed after 1266. These contain references to Emperor Frederick II and King Manfred of Sicily, and permit John to extend Gervase's list of rulers of the Holy Roman Empire down to his own time.

John may also be behind the Old French translation of the Hospitaller rule and of certain documents from the Hospitaller archives in Acre initiated by William of Santo Stefano and undertaken between 1278 and 1283.

== Methodology ==
John's translations were pioneering. Only about ten Old French translations of classical writers are known down to John's time. His Rectorique may be among the two or three earliest true translations, rather than adaptations, from Latin into Old French. It was the first such translation on rhetoric other than a few passages of Brunetto Latini's Trésor. The translation of De topicis differentiis is "one of the first vernacular [European] texts in logic". The significance of this translation lies in the fact that leading contemporary opinion, as expressed by no less than Roger Bacon, was that logic could not be adequately expressed in vernacular languages. Indeed, John had to create new words to translate Boethius, such as entimeme for enthymeme, a word not otherwise attested in medieval French.

In his epilogue on translation, John describes the difference between translating by word and by sense:

... the manner of speaking in Latin is not generally the same as that of French. Neither the properties of words nor the methods of arranging arguments and words in Latin are the same as those of French. And that is [so] generally in every language. Because every language has its own properties and its manner of speaking. ... For that reason it was useful for the translator of this science to translate sometimes word for word, and sometimes and more frequently sentence for sentence, and sometimes because of the great obscurity of a sentence to add to it and lengthen it.

Although the ad verbum (by word) and ad sensum (by sense) distinction was ancient, John's phrase maniere de parler (manner of speaking) has an exact equivalent in Philip of Tripoli's prologue to his translation of the Arabic Secret of Secrets into Latin, which was made in Outremer and where Philip speaks of the differing loquendi modus (way of speaking) between Arabic and Latin. Some of John's emendations that appear in the Rectorique suggest the influence of Donatus.

== Bibliography ==
- Delisle, Léopold (1899). "Notice sur la Rhétorique de Cicéron traduite par Maître Jean d'Antioche". Notices et extraits des manuscrits de la Bibliothèque Nationale et autres bibliothèques. 36: 207–265.
- Folda, Jaroslav (1976). Crusader Manuscript Illumination at Saint-Jean d'Acre, 1275–1291. Princeton University Press.
- Folda, Jaroslav (2005). Crusader Art in the Holy Land, From the Third Crusade to the Fall of Acre. Cambridge University Press.
- Guadagnini, Elisa, ed. (2009). La “Rectorique de Cyceron” tradotta da Jean d'Antioche. Pisa: Edizioni della Normale.
- Pignatelli, Cinzia; Gerner, Dominique, eds. (2006). Les traductions françaises des Otia imperialia de Gervais de Tilbury par Jean d'Antioche et Jean de Vignay. Librairie Droz.
- Pignatelli, Cinzia (2009). "Jean d'Antioche et les exempla ajoutés à la traduction des Otia imperialia de Gervais de Tilbury". In Michèle Goyens; Werner Verbeke (eds.). "Lors est ce jour grant joie nee": Essais de langue et de littérature françaises du Moyen Âge. Universitaire Pers Leuven. pp. 127–136.
- Pignatelli, Cinzia (2016). "Jean d'Antioche". In Graeme Dunphy; Cristian Bratu (eds.). Encyclopedia of the Medieval Chronicle. Brill Online. doi:10.1163/2213-2139_emc_SIM_000351.
- Rubin, Jonathan (2018a). "John of Antioch and the Perceptions of Language and Translation in Thirteenth-Century Acre". In John France (ed.). Acre and Its Falls: Studies in the History of a Crusader City. Brill. pp. 90–104.
- Rubin, Jonathan (2018b). Learning in a Crusader City: Intellectual Activity and Intercultural Exchanges in Acre, 1191–1291. Cambridge University Press.
