= Otia Imperialia =

Early 13th century encyclopedia by Gervase of Tilbury

- "Recreation for an Emperor"
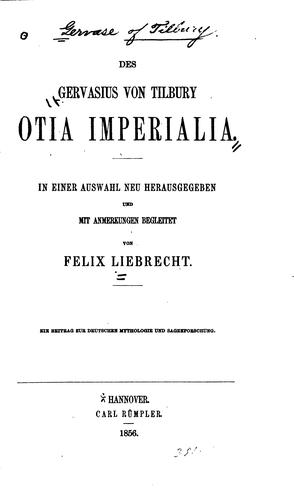
- Title page of 1856 edition
- Author(s): Gervase of Tilbury
- Audience: Otto IV
- Language: Latin
- Date: Early 13th-century
- Genre: Speculum literature
- Subject: History, geography, physics, and folklore

Otia Imperialia (“Recreation for an Emperor”) is an early 13th-century encyclopedic work by Gervase of Tilbury and his best-known work. It is an example of speculum literature. Also known as the “Book of Marvels”, it primarily concerns history, geography, physics, and folklore, and was written for the court of Holy Roman Emperor Otto IV.

Its credibility has been questioned by numerous scholars, including the philosopher Gottfried Leibniz, who was alerted to the fact that it contains many mythical stories. However, many scholars consider it a very important work in that it “recognizes the correctness of the papal claims in the conflict between Church and Empire.”

The work was written between 1210 and 1214, although some give the dates as 1209 to 1214 and numerous authors state it was published c. 1211. These earlier dates must be questioned, however, as the Otia contains stories that take place in 1211 and later. S. E. Banks and James W. Binns, editors and translators of what is considered the definitive version of the Otia, suggest that it was completed in the last years of Otto IV’s life, saying “it seems most likely […] that the work was sent to Otto sometime in 1215”, due to the inclusion of the death of William the Lion, King of Scotland, which took place in 1214, and the fact that King John was still living while it was written; John died in 1216.

== Background ==
Of English origin, Gervase was born in Essex but had family ties to Wiltshire. He travelled widely, studied and taught canon law at Bologna, was in Venice in 1177, and at the reconciliation of Pope Alexander III and Frederick Barbarossa.

He spent some time in the service of Henry II of England, and of his son, Henry the Young King. For the latter, he composed a Liber facetiarum (‘Book of entertainment’), now lost, as well as the basis for what would become the Otia Imperialia. After 1189, Gervase moved to Arles, where he became a Judge. Gervase accompanied Otto of Brunswick to Rome in 1209 for his imperial coronation and was enmeshed in the papacy's struggle with his patron Otto, who was excommunicated by Pope Innocent III.

Gervase employed the next years, from 1210 to 1214, writing the Otia Imperialia for his patron. The Otia was written at a time when other encyclopedic descriptions of the world were being produced and translated, such as the Summarium Heinrici, the Hortus deliciarum (Herrad of Landsberg), the Liber exceptionum (Richard de Saint-Victor, Jean Châtillon), the De proprietatibus rerum (Bartholomeus Anglicus), and the Speculum naturale (Vincent of Beauvais).

== Content ==
Gervase's Otia imperialia is an encyclopedic work concerning history, geography, physics, and folklore, in the manner of speculum literature. It is sometimes associated with the Ebstorf Map, to the extent that some claim the map was meant to accompany the text, but this is a subject of continued debate.

The text is divided into three parts (decisiones). The first is a history of the world from the Creation to the Flood. The second is a geographic treatise on the regions of the known world, as divided between Noah’s three sons. The third section, parts of which have been reprinted separately from the rest of the book, is a compendium of marvels.

Like Honorius of Autun’s Imago mundi and Vincent of Beauvais’s Speculum naturale, the Otia imperialia contains fables attributed to Pliny the Elder and Solinus, as well as other tales and folk beliefs, including the Fairy Horn, a Gloucester variety of the widespread fairy cup legend; the supernatural powers of Virgil; the folk belief that a priest's cloak could be viewed as an element pitting good Christians against the Devil; and the first recorded instance of the Wandlebury Legend, which Gervase summarizes as follows:

In England, on the borders of the diocese of Ely, there is a town called Cantabrica, just outside which is a place known as Wandlebria, from the fact that the Wandeli, when ravaging Britain and savagely putting to death the Christians, placed their camp there. Now, on the hill-top where they pitched their tents, is a level space ringed with entrenchments with a single point of entry, like a gate. A very ancient legend exists, preserved in popular tradition, that if a warrior enters this level space at dead of night by moonlight and calls out 'Knight to knight, come forth', he will at once be faced by a warrior armed for fight, who charging horse against horse, will either dismount his adversary or himself be dismounted.

Gervase recounts that a knight named Osbert Fitz Hugh once tested the story, and legend has it that he defeated the phantom knight, even stealing his horse as a prize, but was wounded in the thigh by his opponent’s javelin on departing.

The third part also includes a version of the Melusine story in which a knight named Raimundus marries a fairy on the condition that he must never see her naked. When he breaks his promise and sees her bathing, she turns into a serpent and disappears.

Some legends are found only in the Otia imperialia, including two later included in Thomas Keightley’s influential The Fairy Mythology. One describes the "portunes”, diminutive humanoids found in France and England, which help peasants finish their domestic chores, but also delight in leading English travellers’ horses into mud. Another is the Grant, a creature of English legend which resembles “a yearling colt, prancing on its hind-legs” and which runs through towns to warn of impending fire. This belief persisted well into the 20th century around Cambridgeshire, albeit applied to hares.

== Reception ==
During the following three centuries, it was much read. By the late 14th century, copies of the Otia Imperialia were circulating in both Latin and French, and Jean d'Arras mentions Gervase in the prologue to his Melusine. It was twice translated into French: by Jean d'Antioche in the 13th and Jean de Vignay in the 14th century. Gottfried Leibniz, who edited parts of it, called it a "bagful of foolish old woman's tales", while its modern Oxford University Press editors less dismissively report "a wealth of accounts of folklore and popular belief". Catholic apologists respect it most of all for the support it offers of Innocent's papal claims in his conflicts between Church and Empire. Portions of it were printed in Historiie Francorum Scriptores (André Duchesne, 1641), and by Joachim Johann Mader (1673). Large portions were published in Scriptores Rerum Brunsvicensium (G. G. Leibnitz, 1707–10). The third part of Otia was edited by Felix Liebrecht and published by Carl Rümpler (1856).

Recent scholarship has argued that the Otia should not be treated simply as a compilation of stories, but as a work shaped by its intended audience. Byrne argues that it repackages scholastic learning and authorities for courtly audiences.
