= Grant (folklore) =

Creature of English folklore

Grant, or Gyant, is a creature of English folklore described in the medieval Latin work Otia Imperialia by Gervase of Tilbury. Gervase describes it as a "kind of demon" resembling "a yearling colt, prancing on its hind-legs, with sparkling eyes", which runs through towns as a warning of fire.

Gervase's account is the only known medieval source to name the creature. Francis Young links the Grant to a wider motif in Britain and Ireland of horse-like bogies encountered on isolated roads by travellers, such as the púca, kelpie, or shagfoal, and suggests that the idea of such beings as warnings of fire is not prominent in later folklore. Joseph Pentangelo instead argues that it was probably a hare, and that the description in the Otia Imperialia may reflect embellishment by Gervase or his informant. He bases this interpretation on later folk beliefs in which a hare running through a village street was treated as a warning of fire, and on the similarities in form.

Earlier writers proposed other identifications. Felix Liebrecht compared the Grant with Grendel and with the demons in the legend of St Guthlac and argued that it was a water spirit. Thomas Keightley and Jacob Grimm likewise linked it to Grendel, largely through name similarity. A 1708 edition of John Cowell's Law Dictionary suggested comparing the grant with the Barguest, a death-omen in northern English folklore, though Pentangelo notes that beyond a few general similarities the creatures have little in common.

== See also ==
- Portunes
