= Rumpler (surname) =

Rumpler (also spelled Rümpler) is a German surname. Notable people with the surname include:

- Carl Rümpler (c. 19th-century), German publisher
- Edmund Rumpler (1872–1940), Austrian automobile and aircraft designer
- Franz Rumpler (1848–1922), Austrian genre painter
- Karl Theodor Rümpler (1817–1891), German botanist and horticulturist
- Yves Rumpler (born 1938), French primatologist

== See also ==
- Rumpler (disambiguation)
