= Duergar (disambiguation) =

Duergar may refer to:

- Simonside Dwarfs, evil dwarfs in Northumbrian folklore that are also known as duergar
- Dwarf (folklore), a mountain-dwelling creature in Germanic folklore and mythology (including Norse mythology) known as dweorg in Old English and dvergr in Old Norse
- Duergar, an evil race of dwarves in Dungeons & Dragons
- Duergar, small loathsome creatures that serve Dracula in the 2004 film Van Helsing
