= Portunus (disambiguation) =

Portunus may refer to:

- Portunus, genus of crabs
- Portunus (mythology), Roman god, or temple devoted to him
- Portunes, creatures of English folklore
- Portunidae, family of crabs which contains the swimming crabs
- Portunoidea, superfamily of crabs that includes the family Portunidae
