= William of Santo Stefano =

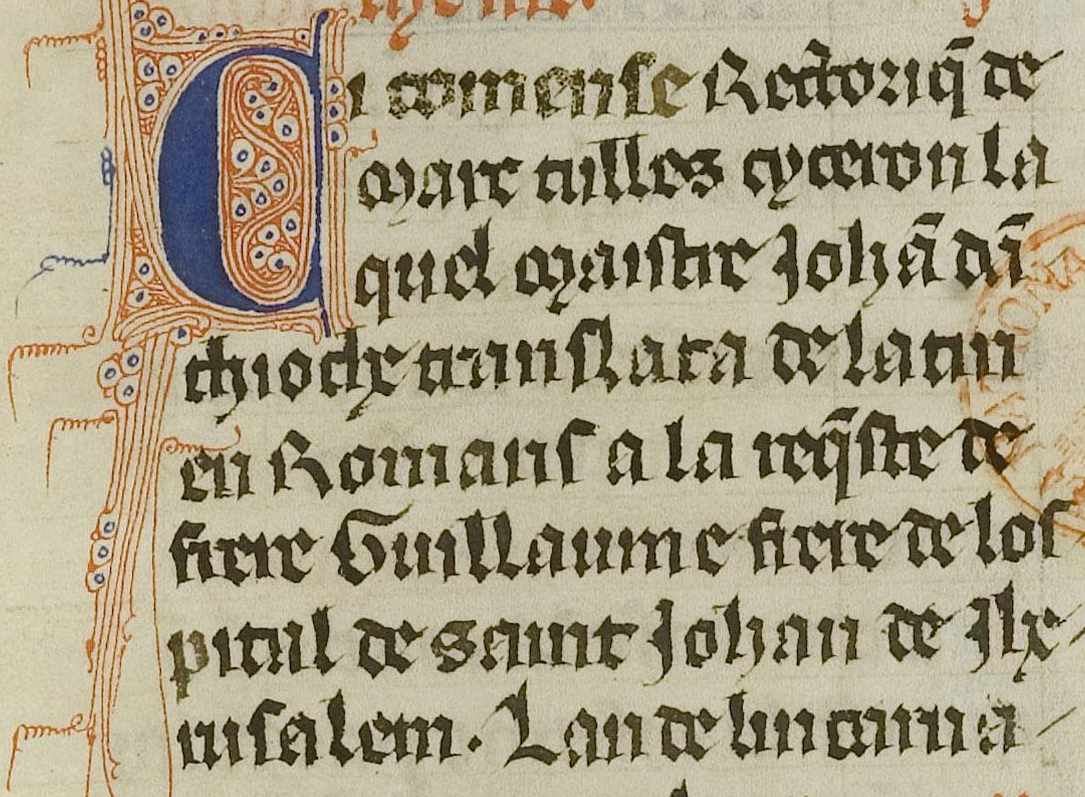
The dedication to Brother William (frere Guillaume in the text) in the Chantilly manuscript of the rhetoric and logic

The colophon identifying Brother William (frere Guillaume) in the Vatican manuscript of the order's documents

William of Santo Stefano, in Italian Guglielmo di Santo Stefano (fl. c. 1278–1303), was an Italian nobleman, historian and patron of letters. He was an active member of the Knights Hospitaller in Outremer, northern Italy and Cyprus, where he was commander from at least 1299 until 1303.

William was one of the most educated Hospitallers of the age. He commissioned translations from Latin into Old French of classical works of rhetoric and logic as well as legal and devotional documents from the Hospital's archives. He also wrote original legal and historical works in Old French.

== Life ==
William was from the Hospitaller priory of Lombardy, which means that besides Lombardy proper he may have come from Savoy, Piedmont or the County of Nice. He was probably a relative of Daniel of Santo Stefano, who was the lieutenant of the prior of Lombardy in 1315 and in that year commissioned a copy of the order's statutes. He was almost certainly trained as a lawyer and was well educated at a time when the Hospital was not known for intellectual pursuits.

Between about 1278 and 1283, William was in Acre, capital of the Kingdom of Jerusalem. He returned to northern Italy after that, seemingly bringing some documents with him. By 1296 he was living in the Kingdom of Cyprus. By 1299, he was the commander (preceptor) of the Hospital in Cyprus, a position he held until 1303 or so. No later reference to him is known. He probably died in that year or shortly after.

== Translations ==
During his time in Acre, William commissioned two translation projects. He is in fact the only nobleman known to have commissioned a book in 13th-century Acre. He had John of Antioch translate Cicero's De inventione and the anonymous Rhetorica ad Herennium from Latin into Old French. This was completed in 1282. What is probably the original presentation copy of John's work still survives in Chantilly, Musée Condé, MS fr. 433 (590). This manuscript also contains a translation of selections from Boethius' De topicis differentiis, a work on logic. It is unclear if these were new translations commissioned by William or if they are the work of John.

William's other translation project from Latin into French was of certain documents in the archives of the Hospital in Acre, including the order's statutes, prayers and privileges. The translator of this selection of texts is unknown. Possibly it was John. The original copy of these translations is in the Vatican, Biblioteca Apostolica Vaticana, MS lat. 4852. A marginal colophon dedicates the work to William.

== Writings ==
William's views on the vernacular were advanced for his time. When even Roger Bacon thought it insufficient for formal logic, a codex prepared for William contained one of the earliest vernacular texts on the subject in Europe. William himself wrote on history and jurisprudence in French, which was the official language of the Hospital. He is not known to have written in Italian or Latin.

William wrote his history of the order after the fall of Acre in 1291. It is crudely structured around the grand masters, but William displays a critical eye to his sources, which he always carefully cites. He swept aside numerous legends about the Hospital's foundation, including some that pushed it as far back as the second century before Christ, as fabrications designed to encourage donations. He beseeches his readers, Ores leissons la vanité, et tenons la verité ("Now let us let go of vanity, and hold to the truth").

In 1296 while on Cyprus, William wrote a treatise on the order's statutes, in which he displays his legal training by discussing the principles of natural law and citing Gratian, Cicero, Isidore and Augustine. His original works were probably intended in part to replace some of what was lost in the fall of Acre.

== Bibliography ==
- Luttrell, Anthony T. (1965). "Fourteenth-Century Hospitaller Lawyers". Traditio. 21: 449–456. doi:10.1017/s0362152900017761.
- Luttrell, Anthony T. (1998). "The Hospitallers' Early Written Records". In John France; William G. Zajac (eds.). The Crusades and Their Sources: Essays Presented to Bernard Hamilton. Ashgate. pp. 135–154. doi:10.4324/9781315240442. ISBN 9781315240442.
- Luttrell, Anthony T. (2021). "Confusion in the Hospital's pre-1291 Statutes". Crusades. 19: 109–114. doi:10.4324/9781003118596-5.
- Nicholson, Helen J. (2001). The Knights Hospitaller. The Boydell Press.
- Rubin, Jonathan (2018). Learning in a Crusader City: Intellectual Activity and Intercultural Exchanges in Acre, 1191–1291. Cambridge University Press.
- Riley-Smith, Jonathan (1967). The Knights of St. John in Jerusalem and Cyprus, c. 1050–1310. Macmillan.
- Riley-Smith, Jonathan (2012). The Knights Hospitaller in the Levant, c.1070–1309. Palgrave Macmillan.
