= Carl Rümpler =

German publisher

Carl Rümpler (born 17 Dezember 1820 in Hannover) was a German publisher, based in Hanover. He and his publishing company of the same name published a high number of works in the 1850s–1870s. He published many books related to myths and tales such as Gervase of Tilbury's medieval encyclopedia Otia Imperialia in 1856, he also published works such as Herman Grimm's Leben Michelangelo in two volumes between 1860 and 1863 amongst many others.
