= Rumpler (disambiguation) =

Rumpler is an Austrian automotive and aircraft manufacturer.

Rumpler may also refer to:

- Rumpler (surname) or Rümpler, a surname
- Rumpler Tropfenwagen, an Austrian automobile brand
