= Sequence of Saint Eulalia =

Earliest surviving piece of French hagiography

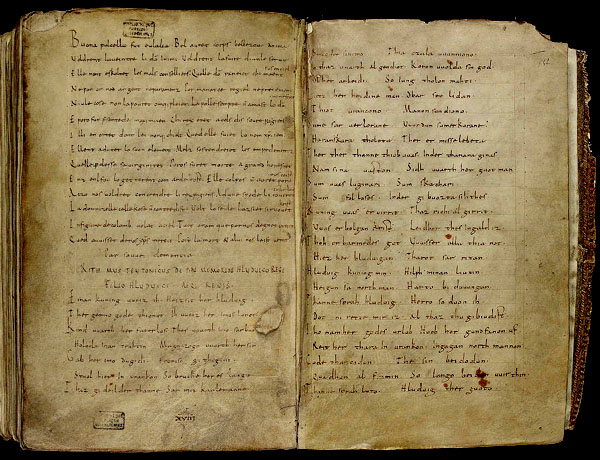
Manuscript of the Sequence of Saint Eulalia, Valenciennes Municipal Library

The Sequence of Saint Eulalia, also known as the Canticle of Saint Eulalia (French: Séquence/Cantilène de sainte Eulalie) is the earliest surviving piece of French hagiography and one of the earliest extant texts in the vernacular langues d'oïl (Old French). It dates from around 880.

Eulalia of Mérida was an early Christian martyr from Mérida, Spain, who was killed during the Persecution of Diocletian around 304. Her legend is recounted in the 29 verses of the Sequence, in which she resists pagan threats, bribery and torture from the pagan emperor Maximian. She miraculously survives being burned at the stake, but is finally decapitated. She then ascends to heaven in the form of a dove.

The Sequence was composed in verse around 880, soon after the rediscovery of the relics of a saint of the same name, Eulalia of Barcelona, in 878.

== Manuscript ==
The manuscript containing the Sequence is a collection of sermons by Gregory of Nazianzus. It is first mentioned in a 12th-century catalog of the library of Saint-Amand Abbey, although the production of the manuscript has been dated to the early 9th century. It is not known with certainty where it was produced. B. Bischoff suggests that it came from a scriptorium in (Lower) Lotharingia, but not from Saint-Amand itself, given its style of construction and the handwriting, which cannot be matched to other manuscripts produced there during the same period.

The manuscript is less significant for its original content, however, than for the empty pages at the end that later scribes filled in with additional texts. These include:

- the top half of f141: a 14-line Latin poem about Saint Eulalia (Cantica uirginis eulalie)
- the top half of f141v: the Sequence of Saint Eulalia in vernacular Romance
- from the bottom of f141v to the top of f143: the Ludwigslied (Rithmus teutonicus), written in a variety of Old High German.

The Sequence and the Ludwigslied are written in the same hand, and since the preamble of the Ludwigslied (which celebrates the battle of Saucourt, which took place on 3 August 881) speaks of Louis III (who died in 882) as being alive, both additions to the manuscript are dated to late 881 or early 882.

When Jean Mabillon visited Saint-Amand Abbey in 1672, he made a hasty copy of the Ludwigslied, but neither he nor his hosts seem to have recognized the significance of the Sequence immediately preceding it. When Mabillon and the historian Johannes Schilter attempted to obtain a better transcription of the Ludwigslied in 1693, the monks of the abbey were unable to locate the manuscript. It remained lost throughout the 18th century, until the entire contents of the abbey library were confiscated and transferred to Valenciennes in 1792, by order of the revolutionary government. In September 1837, Hoffmann von Fallersleben visited the library of Valenciennes with the intention of unearthing the lost text of the Ludwigslied. According to his account, it only took him one afternoon to find the manuscript and to realize that it contained another important text, the Sequence of Saint Eulalia.

== Text ==
The Eulalia text is a sequence or "prose" consisting of 14 assonant couplets, each written on one line and separated by a punctus, followed by a final unpaired coda verse. The Sequence follows no strict meter. Most of the couplets consist of two ten-syllable verses, although some have 11, 12, or 13 syllables.

Both the vernacular Sequence and the Latin poem that precedes it show similarities with the hymn to Eulalia in the Peristephanon, by the 4th-century Christian poet Prudentius.

A transcription of the original text is provided below (with abbreviations expanded and some word boundaries inserted), along with a reconstructed phonetic transcription and an English translation.

| Text | Reconstructed pronunciation | Translation |
|---|---|---|
| Buona pulcella fut eulalia. Bel auret corps bellezour anima Voldrent la veintre li deo Inimi. Voldrent la faire diaule seruir Elle no'nt eskoltet les mals conselliers. Qu'elle deo raneiet chi maent sus en ciel. Ne por or ned argent ne paramenz. Por manatce regiel ne preiement. Niule cose non la pouret omque pleier. La polle sempre non amast lo deo menestier. E por o fut presentede maximiien. Chi rex eret a cels dis soure pagiens Il li enortet dont lei nonque chielt. Qued elle fuiet lo nom christiien. Ell'ent adunet lo suon element. Melz sostendreiet les empedementz Qu'elle perdesse sa virginitet. Por o's furet morte a grand honestet Enz enl fou lo getterent com arde tost. Elle colpes non auret, por o no's coist. A czo no's voldret concreidre li rex pagiens. Ad une spede li roveret tolir lo chieef. La domnizelle celle kose non contredist. Volt lo seule lazsier si ruovet Krist. In figure de colomb volat a ciel. Tuit oram que por nos degnet preier. Qued avuisset de nos Christus mercit Post la mort et a lui nos laist venir Par souue clementia. | bwᴐnə pyltsɛlə fyθ əylaljə bɛl avrəθ kᴐrps bɛlədzou̯r anəmə vᴐldrənt la vei̯ntrə li dɛə enəmi vᴐldrənt la fai̯rə diavlə sɛrvir elə nᴐnt ɛskoltəθ les mals konseʎɛrs kelə dɛə rənei̯əθ ki mæ̃nt sys en tsjɛl nə pᴐr ᴐr nəð ardʒɛnt nə parəmɛnts pᴐr mənatsə rei̯jɛl nə prei̯əmɛnt nylə kᴐzə non la pᴐu̯rəθ omkə plei̯ɛr la polə sɛmprə non amast lə dɛə mənɛstjɛr ɛ pᴐrᴐ fyθ prəzɛntɛðə maksimjɛn ki rei̯s ɛrəθ a tsels dis sovrə pai̯jɛns el li ənᴐrtəθ dont lei̯ nonkə tʃjɛlt (Note: In contrast, Fought (1979) interprets ⟨ch⟩ as representing [k] in ⟨chielt⟩ and ⟨chief⟩, as well as in ⟨chi⟩ (from Latin qui).) keð elə fɥiəθ lə nom krestjɛn elent aðynəθ lə swᴐn elemɛnt mjɛls sostɛndrei̯əθ les ɛmpɛðəmɛnts kelə pɛrdesə sa virdʒinitɛθ pᴐrᴐs fyrəθ mᴐrtə a ɡrant ᴐnɛstɛθ ents enl fᴐu̯ la dʒətɛrənt kom ardə tᴐst elə kolpəs non avrəθ pᴐrᴐ nos kᴐi̯st a tsə nos vᴐldrəθ konkrei̯ðrə li rei̯s pai̯jɛns að ynə spɛðə li rᴐvɛrəθ tᴐlir lə tʃjɛf la dᴐmnidzɛlə tselə kᴐzə non kontrədist vᴐlt lə səylə laɕjɛr si rwᴐvəθ krist en fiɡyrə də kᴐlom vᴐləθ a tsjɛl tɥiθ oram kə pᴐr nos deɲəθ prei̯jɛr keð avɥisəθ də nos kristəs mɛrtsiθ pᴐst la mᴐrt ɛð a lɥi nos lai̯st vənir par sou̯və kləmɛntsə | Eulalia was a good girl, She had a beautiful body, a soul more beautiful still. The enemies of God wanted to overcome her, they wanted to make her serve the devil. She does not listen to the evil counsellors, (who want her) to deny God, who lives up in heaven. Not for gold, nor silver, nor jewels, not for the king's threats or entreaties, nothing could ever persuade the girl not to love continually the service of God. And for this reason she was brought before Maximian, who was king in those days over the pagans. He exhorts her — but she does not care — to abandon the Christian name; She gathers up her strength." / "And subsequently worship his god. (Note: See Line 15, below, for the interpretation of line 15.); She would rather undergo persecution Than lose her spiritual purity. For these reasons she died in great honor. They threw her into the fire so that she would burn quickly. She had no sins, for this reason she did not burn. The pagan king did not want to give in to this; He ordered her head to be cut off with a sword. The girl did not oppose that idea: She wants to abandon earthly life, and she calls upon Christ. In the form of a dove she flew to heaven. Let us all pray that she will deign to pray for us That Christ may have mercy on us And may allow us to come to Him after death Through His grace. |

== Analysis ==
=== Dialect ===
The language of the Sequence presents characteristics of Walloon, Champenois, and Picard. At the time, these three Oïl varieties shared a common scripta, or written literary koiné. The evidence points to a geographic origin for the text in modern-day Wallonia or an adjacent region of north-east France.

Some northern/northeastern dialectal features of the texts are:

- the stressed form lei of the feminine singular dative pronoun (line 13)
- the 1st person plural imperative ending -am in oram (line 26)
- the unpalatalized initial k in the forms cose and kose (< Latin causa), contrasting with t͡ʃ in Francien dialect to the south (mod. Fr. chose)
- vocalization of b before l in diaule (line 4, < diabolem)
- lowering of pre-tonic /en/ to /an/ in raneiet (line 6, < *reneget) and manatce (line 8, < mĭnacia).

In contrast, the epenthetic d indicated by the forms voldrent (lines 3, 4, < uoluerunt), voldret (line 21, < uoluerat) and sostendreiet (line 16, < sustinerebat) is more characteristic of central French dialects.

The pronoun lo that appears in line 19 (instead of the expected feminine form la) has been variously explained as a dialectal feature, a pejorative neuter ("they threw it into the fire"), or simply a scribal error.

=== Line 15 ===
Line 15 of the Sequence is "one of the most vexed lines of Old French literature". The identity of the verb is debated: early editors read adunet, but a reexamination of the manuscript by Learned (1941) revealed that the copyist originally wrote aduret. Scholars disagree about whether the line turning the ⟨r⟩ into an ⟨n⟩ was an inadvertent ink smudge or a deliberate correction by the copyist. Several interpretations have been proposed for both readings, including:

- adunet: "reunites, assembles", "affirms"
- aduret: "hardens", "adores", "endures"

Scholars further disagree about whether the possessive adjective in lo suon element refers to Eulalia or to Maximian, and about the nature of this element. Questions also surround the syntactic construction of the line, as well as the interpretation of the verse within the context of the Sequence.

The following examples illustrate the variety of translations suggested for this verse:

- "Elle réplique en affirmant « l'élément » qui est sien [= sa virginité]" (Note: "She responds by affirming her element [i.e. purity, virginity]")
- "Elle n'en devint que plus forte dans ces principes religieux" (Note: "She only became more steadfast in her religious principles")
- "She steeled her soul (she strengthened herself inwardly)"
- "That she worship his false god"
- "Elle endure le feu [= son élément]" (Note: "She endures the flames")

== See also ==
- Oaths of Strasbourg
