= De Inventione =

Rhetorical work by Cicero

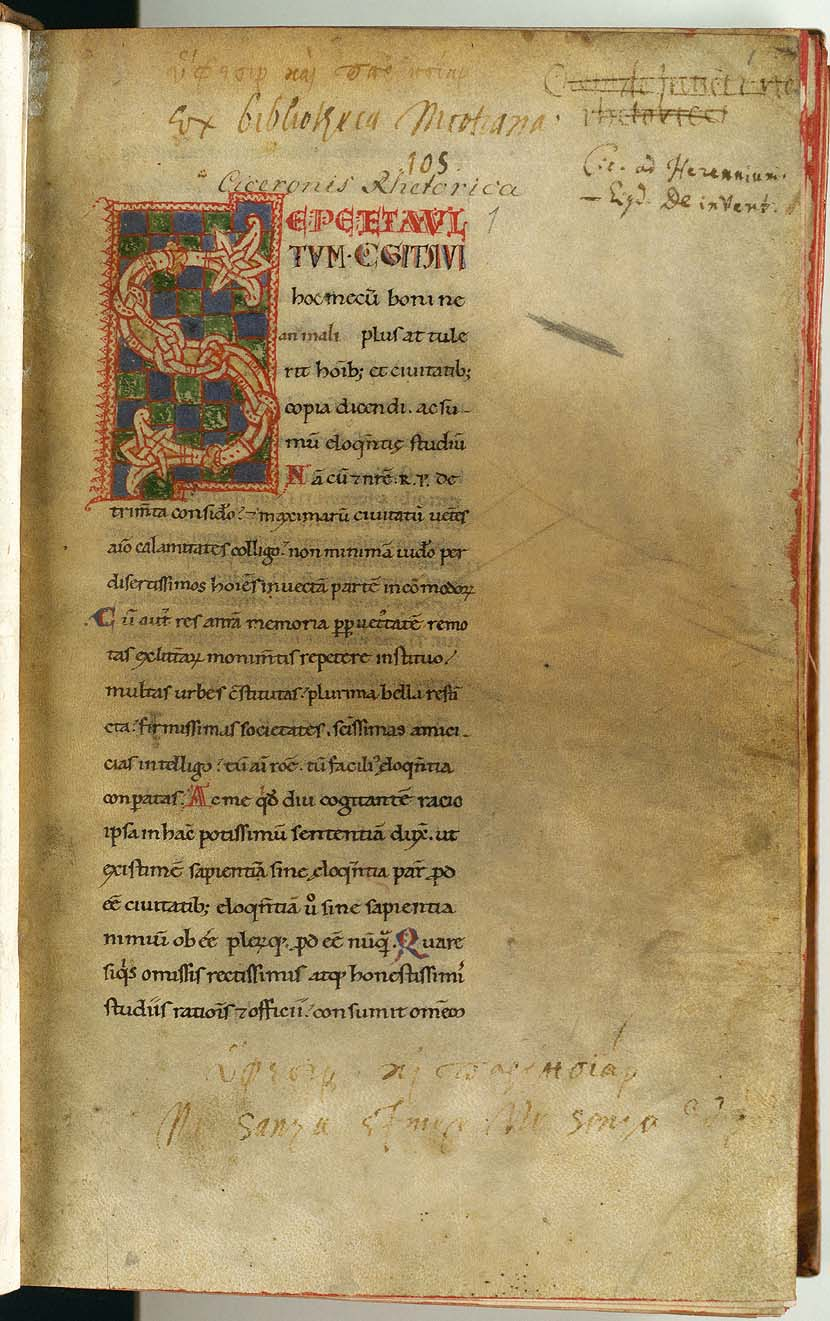
- Beginning of an Italian manuscript version, early 12th century
- Author: Cicero
- Language: Classical Latin

De Inventione is a handbook for orators that Cicero composed when he was still a young man. Quintilian tells us that Cicero considered the work rendered obsolete by his later writings. Despite Cicero’s original plan to cover all five components of Rhetoric, the final work only deals with the first component, Invention. It is also credited with the first recorded use of the term "liberal arts" or artes liberales, though whether Cicero coined the term is unclear. The text also defines the concept of dignitas: dignitas est alicuius honesta et cultu et honore et verecundia digna auctoritas (Dignity is honorable prestige. It merits respect, honour, and reverence.).

At the request of William of Santo Stefano, De Inventione was translated into Old French by John of Antioch in 1282.

== Date ==
It is not known precisely when De inventione was composed; the work’s date of composition can only be deduced from the evidence. Cicero mentions having written a rhetorical treatise while he was a child (puer) or a very young man (adulescentulus), the latter of which would suggest he was at least 17 or 18 when he wrote it. Of the period during which he was this age, 88/87 BCE was a period of civil strife and the return of Sylla in 83 BCE marked the start of a civil war, while the period 86-83 BCE was one of relative stability that would be more conducive to composition. The composition and initial circulation of this work are generally dated to the end of this more tranquil period, so 84 or 83 BCE (when Cicero was 22 or 23), although the work also contains passages of a scholarly nature that are suggestive of the period in which Cicero was studying—perhaps notes taken after 91 BCE.

The chronologies of Cicero of Pierre Grimal and Yves Roman date the composition of De inventione to 86 BCE.

== Cicero's Five Canons of Rhetoric ==
In his writing De Inventione, Cicero explained the five canons or tenets of rhetoric. The five canons apply to rhetoric and public speaking. The five canons are invention, arrangement, style, memory, and delivery.

== Editions ==
=== Latin ===
- Cicero, M. T. (1745). The oration of Marcus Tullius Cicero, for Marcus Marcellus, address’d to Caius Julius Cæsar, dictator, and the Roman Senate; being a specimen of a translation of Tully’s select orations. To which is prefix’d Cicero’s preface to his first book of invention, translated into English. Being a Dissertaion on the Rise, Progress, and Decay of Eloquence. London: printed for R. Dodsley, and sold by M. Cooper at the Globe in Pater-Noster-Row.
- Friedrich, Gulielmus, ed. (1893). "De inventione". Scripta quae manserunt omnia, Pars I, Opera Rhetorica, Vol I (in Latin). Leipzig: B.G. Teubneri. pp. 117–236. OCLC 41672630.
- De inventione . Opera philosophica (in Latin).
- Hubbell, Harry Mortimer, ed. (1949). De Inventione (in Latin and English). Translated by Hubbell, Harry Mortimer. Cambridge, Massachusetts: Harvard University Press. pp. 2–346. LCCN 49049645.
- Stroebel, Eduard, ed. (1915). "De inventione". Scripta quae manserunt omnia: Rhetorici libri duo qui vocantur de inventione (in Latin). Leipzig: B.G. Teubneri. hdl:2027/mdp.39015065485552. OCLC 7880780. Reprinted as
  - "RHETORICI LIBRI DUO [QUI VOCANTUR DE INVENTIONE]". latin.packhum.org. Classical Latin Texts (in Latin). Los Altos, California: Packard Humanities Institute. 1990s. (With API and AI-friendly)
- Carey, William L., ed. (n.d.). "De inventione". TheLatinLibrary.com.
- "De inventione". DocumentaCatholicaOmnia.eu. Cooperatorum Veritatis Societas. 6 February 2005.

=== English ===
- Cicero, M. T. (1745). The oration of Marcus Tullius Cicero, for Marcus Marcellus, address’d to Caius Julius Cæsar, dictator, and the Roman Senate; being a specimen of a translation of Tully’s select orations. To which is prefix’d Cicero’s preface to his first book of invention, translated into English. Being a Dissertaion on the Rise, Progress, and Decay of Eloquence. London: printed for R. Dodsley, and sold by M. Cooper at the Globe in Pater-Noster-Row. Preface reprinted at blog.
- On invention . Translated by Yonge, Charles Duke. 1853. Also available from ToposText.org Peithô's Web
- Hubbell, Harry Mortimer, ed. (1949). De Inventione (in Latin and English). Translated by Hubbell, Harry Mortimer. Cambridge, Massachusetts: Harvard University Press. pp. 2–346. LCCN 49049645. OCLC 685652.
