= Portunes =

Creature of English folklore

Portunes, or Neptunes, are creatures of English folklore described only in the medieval Latin work Otia Imperialia by Gervase of Tilbury. Gervase lists them as demons, but writes that they might instead be a "mysterious ghost" of unknown origin.

In Gervase's account Portunes enter peasant houses at night, warm themselves by the fire, and roast small frogs which they carry in their pockets. He described them as having an "aged appearance and wrinkled face", and being "very small in stature, measuring less than half a thumb". Gervase wrote that they assist peasants by performing heavy domestic work quickly, and also described a prank in which they take a solitary English rider's reins at night and lead the horse into mud before leaving "roaring with laughter".

C. C. Oman argues that the description of the size of the Portunes is corrupted because the size of the creatures is incompatible with the housework they do and Thomas Keightley suggests that pollicis was erroneously substituted for pedis. S. E. Banks and J. W. Binns dispute this, arguing that the manuscripts are in agreement and Gervase clearly intended to describe them as very small.

They are commonly compared to pucks, while Oman compares them to goblins and K. M. Briggs classes them as a type of fairy, arguing that Gervase's account was the first description of small English fairies. Felix Liebrecht argues from their name that they are a type of water spirit.

== Naming ==
Gervase writes that the creatures were called Neptunes in France and Portunes in England, but the vernacular forms are unknown because he gives only Latinised terms representing the local names. Francis Young derives the French term from netun, meaning "marine monster", and links it to the Christian demonisation of the Roman god Neptune.

Young also considers a link between the English name and the Roman god Portunus, but argues that a direct relationship is unlikely because there is no evidence for a cult of Portunus in Roman Britain and because it is implausible that the god's agricultural associations survived into the thirteenth century. He suggests that Gervase may have coined the English name as a demonisation of Portunus to mirror the French name.

== See also ==
- Grant (folklore)
