= Coenraad Liebrecht Temminck Groll =

Dutch architect, historian, and conservator

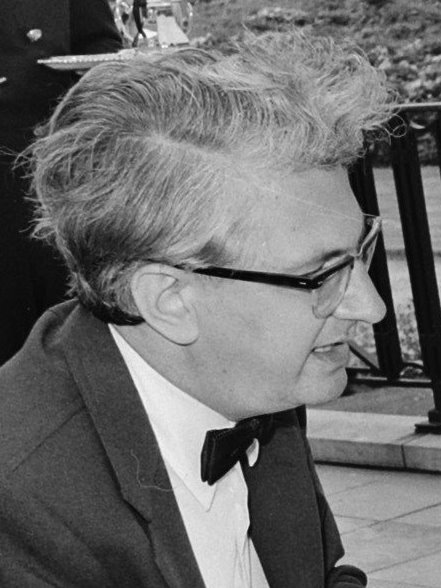
- Temminck Groll in 1973
- Born: March 1, 1925; Amsterdam
- Died: February 14, 2015 (aged 89); Driebergen
- Occupation: Architect

Coenraad Liebrecht (Coen) Temminck Groll (March 1, 1925, in Amsterdam – February 14, 2015, in Driebergen) was a Dutch architect, architectural historian, professor, and conservator.

Temminck Groll earned his doctorate in 1963 with a thesis on medieval stone houses in Utrecht. From 1973 to 1986 he was Professor of Architecture and Restoration at the Delft University of Technology. He photographed and wrote about the architectural heritage of the Netherlands and of Dutch overseas territories in Asia, the Americas and Africa. He helped restore several churches in Utrecht.

Temminck Groll was buried in the family grave at cemetery De Nieuwe Ooster in Amsterdam.

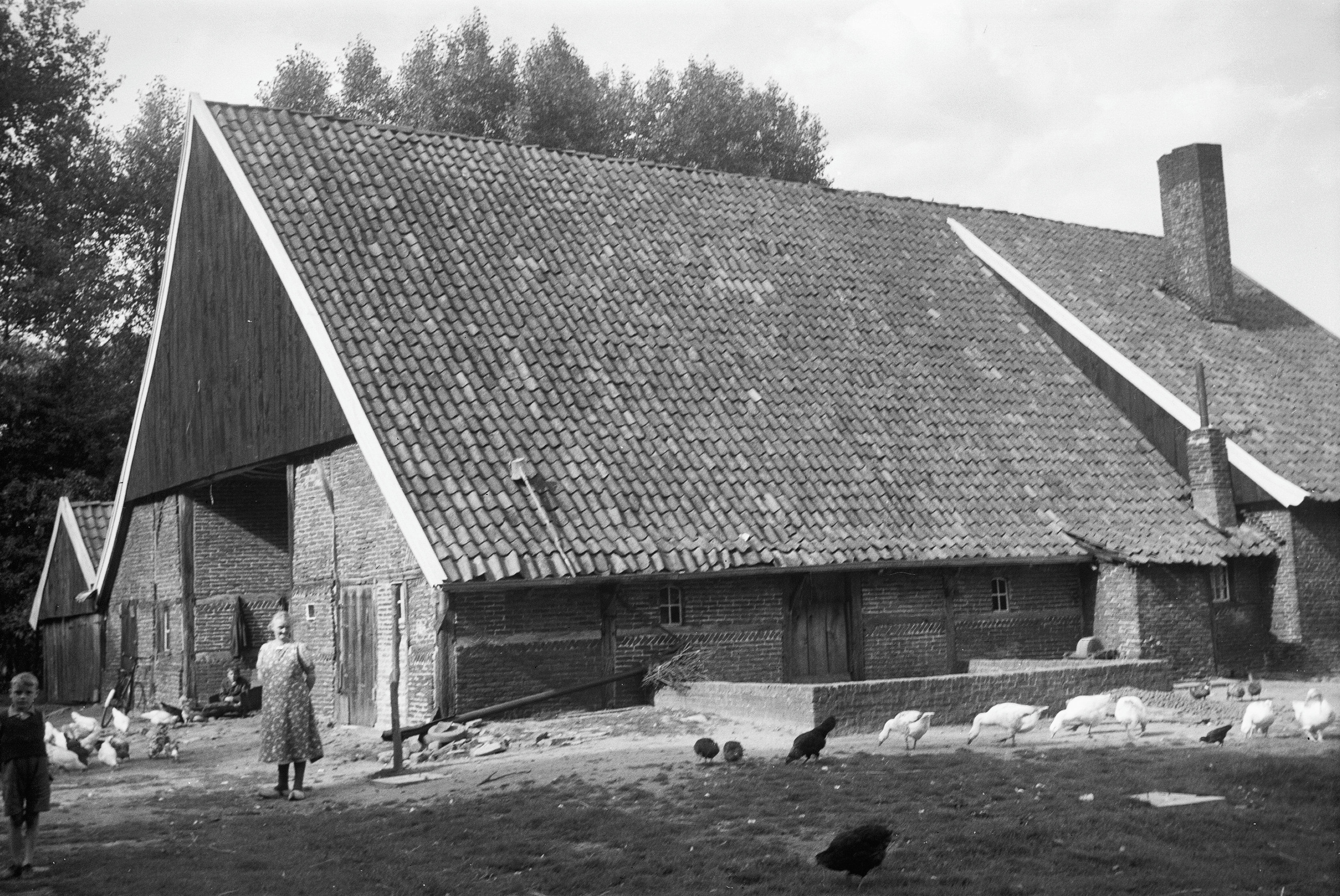
Meddo, Winterswijk, the Netherlands
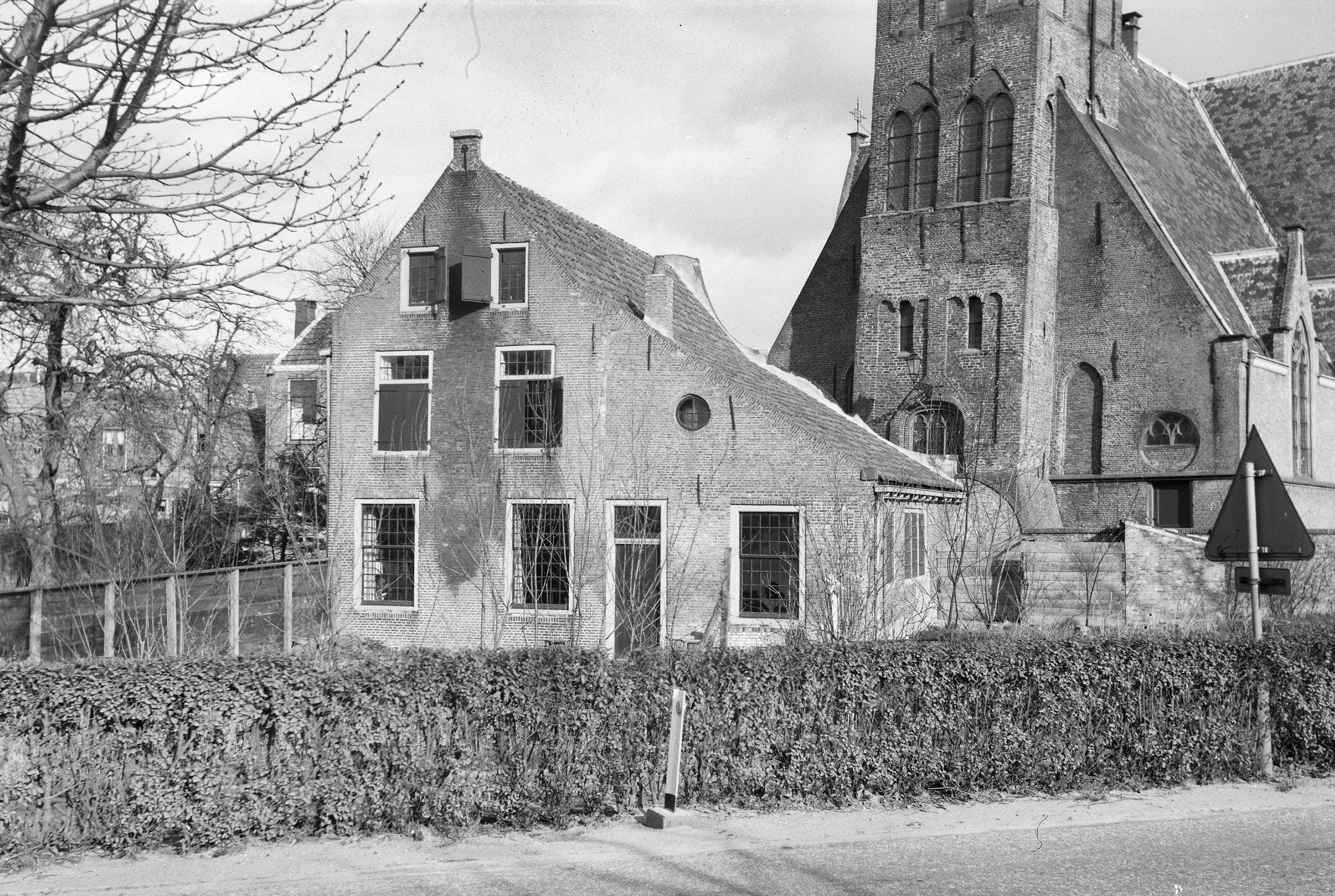
Haastrecht

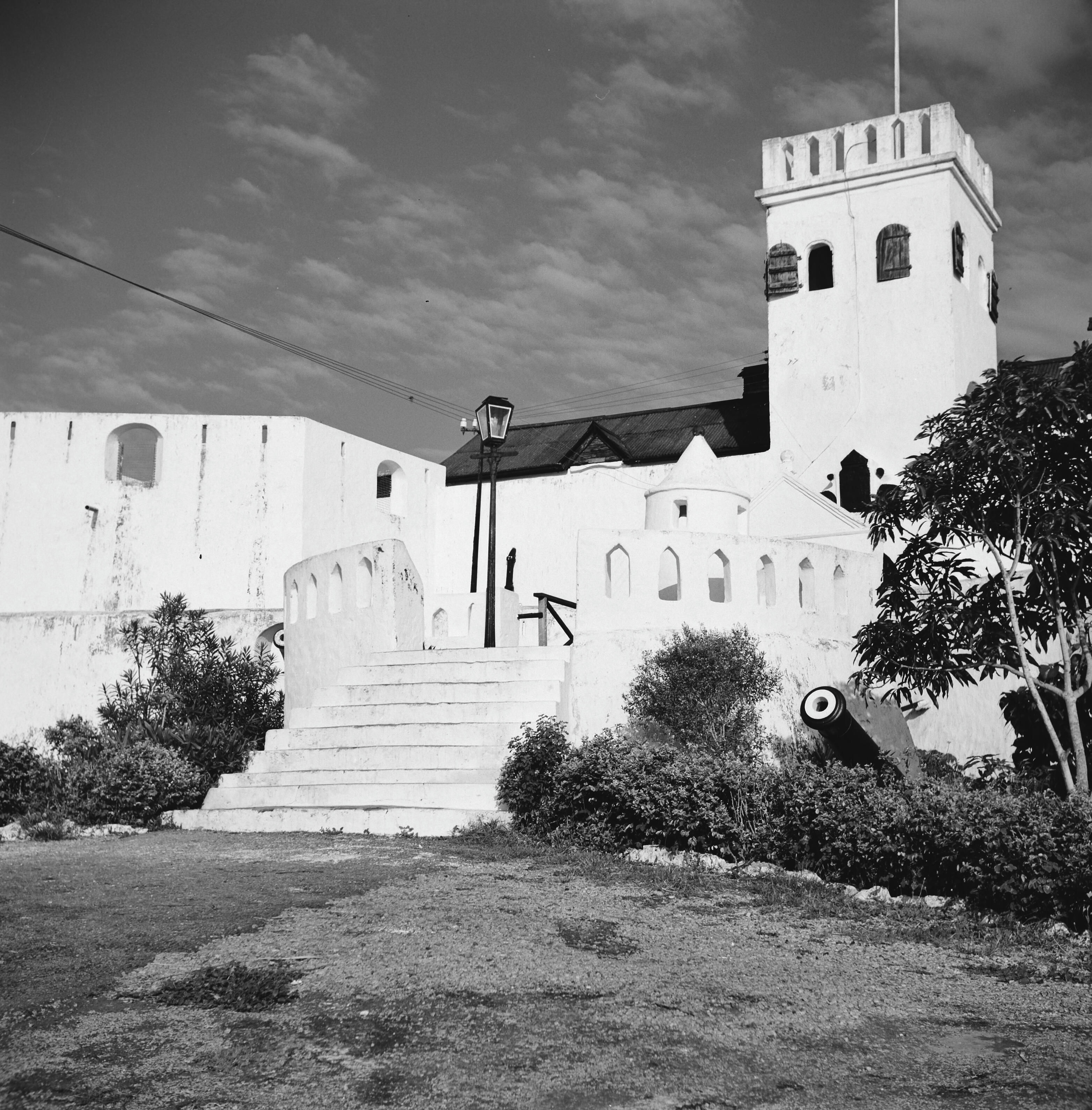
Elmina, Ghana

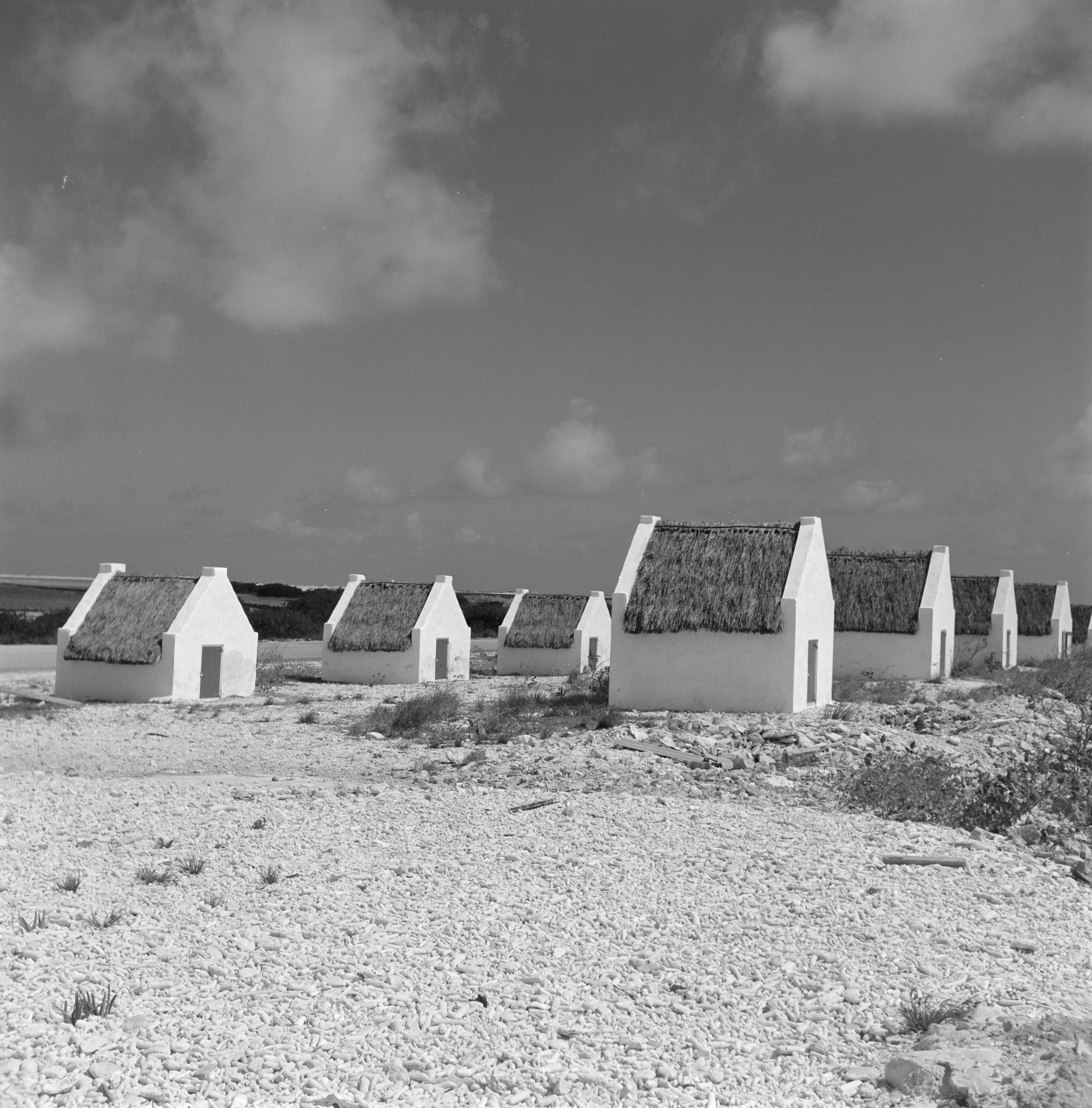
Slave quarters, Bonaire

== Bibliography ==
- Medieval stone houses in Utrecht and their relationship with other northwestern European cities, The Hague 1963, Martinus Nijhoff (thesis).
- The architecture of Suriname: 1667-1930 (et al.), Zutphen, 1973, the Walburg Press.
- Dutch Overseas. Architectural survey. Mutual heritage of four centuries in three continents (et al.), Zwolle 2002, Waanders.
