= Simonside Dwarfs =

Race of dwarfs in English folklore

The Simonside Dwarfs, also known as Brownmen, Bogles and Duergar, are in English folklore a race of dwarfs, particularly associated with the Simonside Hills of Northumberland, in northern England. Their leader was said to be known as Heslop.

In Frederick Grice's telling of the traditional story The Duergar in Folk Tales of the North Country (1944), one of them is described as being short, wearing a lambskin coat, moleskin trousers and shoes, and a hat made of moss stuck with a feather.

The legendary dwarfs of Simonside were mentioned in the local newspaper, the Morpeth Gazette, in 1889, and in Tyndale's Legends and Folklore of Northumbria, 1930. They delighted in leading travellers astray, especially after dark, often carrying lighted torches to lead them into bogs, rather like a Will-o'-the-wisp. The menacing creatures would often disappear at dawn.

The word duergar is likely to be derived from the dialectal words for "dwarf" on the Anglo-Scottish border which include dorch, dwerch, duerch, Duergh and Duerwe amongst others with a later, mistakenly added Norse -ar plural, perhaps as a result of linguistic misattestation. It may also come from the Old Norse word for dwarf or dwarfs (dvergar). These Border words for "dwarf", like the Standard English form, all derive from the Old English dweorh or dweorg via the Middle English dwerg.

In the 2004 film Van Helsing, the Duergi are the minions of Count Dracula.

== See also ==
- Brown Man of the Muirs
- English mythology
- Norse mythology
