= Felix Liebrecht =

German folklorist (1812–1890)

Felix Liebrecht (13 March 1812 – 3 August 1890) was a German folklorist.

== Biography ==
Liebrecht was born in Namslau, Prussian Silesia. He studied philology at the University of Breslau, the Ludwig-Maximilians-Universität München, and the Friedrich Wilhelm University of Berlin, and in 1851 became professor of the German language at the Athénée Royal at Liège, Belgium. He resigned his chair and retired into private life in 1867. He died in Saint-Hubert, Belgium. After he suffered a stroke in 1887, a daughter took her aged father to live with her, and he died in her home on August 3, 1890.

== Works ==
Translations by Liebrecht include:

- Giambattista Basile's Pentamerone, with introduction by Jakob Grimm (1846).
- Johannes Damascenus's Barlaam und Josaphat (1847).
- John Colin Dunlop's Geschichte der Prosadichtungen (1851).
- an edition of Gervasius of Tilbury's Otia Imperialia (1856).
- George Cornewall Lewis's Untersuchungen über die Glaubwürdigkeit der altrömischen Geschichte (2 volumes, 1858).

A collection of original essays by him was published at Heilbronn in 1879, under the title Zur Volkskunde.
