= Gervase of Tilbury =

English canonist and writer

Gervase of Tilbury (Latin: Gervasius Tilberiensis; c. 1150–1220) was an English canon lawyer, statesman and cleric. He enjoyed the favour of Henry II of England and later of Henry's grandson, Emperor Otto IV, for whom he wrote his best known work, the Otia Imperialia.

== Life and works ==
Gervase was of the son of a knight of the Honor of Rayleigh. (Note: Medieval legends link him with the water-sprite Melusine.) He was born around 1150 in West Tilbury, in Essex, a manor in the hands of Henry of Essex, (Note: The Dictionary of National Biography, (Banks S. E. 2004) states "he presumably came from Tilbury in Essex", which must appear ambiguous to the modern enquirer. There are four Tilburys in the county; Tilbury (the dock town, founded from c.1883), East Tilbury and West Tilbury (both medieval manors and parishes) on the Thames shore and Tilbury Juxta Clare in the north of the shire. However, the source of the matter goes back to William Lambarde (1536-1601), county historian of Kent, who held the post of Keeper of the Rolls Chapel, 1597 and was latterly keeper of the records at the Tower of London. Lambarde spoke of Gervase as 'a learned man ... who was kindred to that Kinge (Henry II) and wrote divers learned Woorkes" and adds that Gervase came from West Tilbury, known as Great Tilbury in his day. Whether born in the manor or not, West Tilbury seems the legitimate placing for him as the manor of West Tilbury Hall had fallen into the hands of Henry II after its tenant in chief, William of Essex, defaulted in the King’s service against the Welsh at the battle of Ewloe in 1163, when Gervase would have been about 13. Also, in 1165 a family surnamed "de Tilbury" was present in the district – Robert de Tillebury held two Knights' fees at Childerditch, about 5 miles off. This same land (Tillingham Hall manor) continued to be tithable to West Tilbury Hall manor until the 18th century. Gervase is therefore convincingly one of this family (of which DNB suggests nothing is known, though it confirms she was related to Patrick, earl of Salisbury). Wright’s History of Essex 1834 calls Gervase "a nephew" of Henry II. A favoured bastard line from Henry II offers a plausible solution to the de Tilbury house, which would explain the unusual circumstance – referred to in an inquisition dated 1362 – of the de Tilbury's private chapel at West Tilbury's river edge (dedicated to St. Mary Magdalen) being a place where the chaplain was to "celebrate daily for the souls of the predecessors of the King and the ancestors of the lords of the manor ...") although some say that he was brought up in Rome, this is highly improbable

He travelled widely, studied and taught canon law at Bologna. He was in Venice in 1177, at the reconciliation of Pope Alexander III and Frederick Barbarossa. He spent some time in the service of Henry II of England, and of his son, "Henry the Young King". For Henry, he composed a Liber facetiarum (‘Book of entertainment’), now lost, as well as the basis for what would become the Otia Imperialia. He also served William of the White Hands, the brother of the Count of Blois William of Champagne, Archbishop of Reims, where Gervase's famous attempt to seduce an unwilling girl precipitated her condemnation by the archbishop as a Cathar.

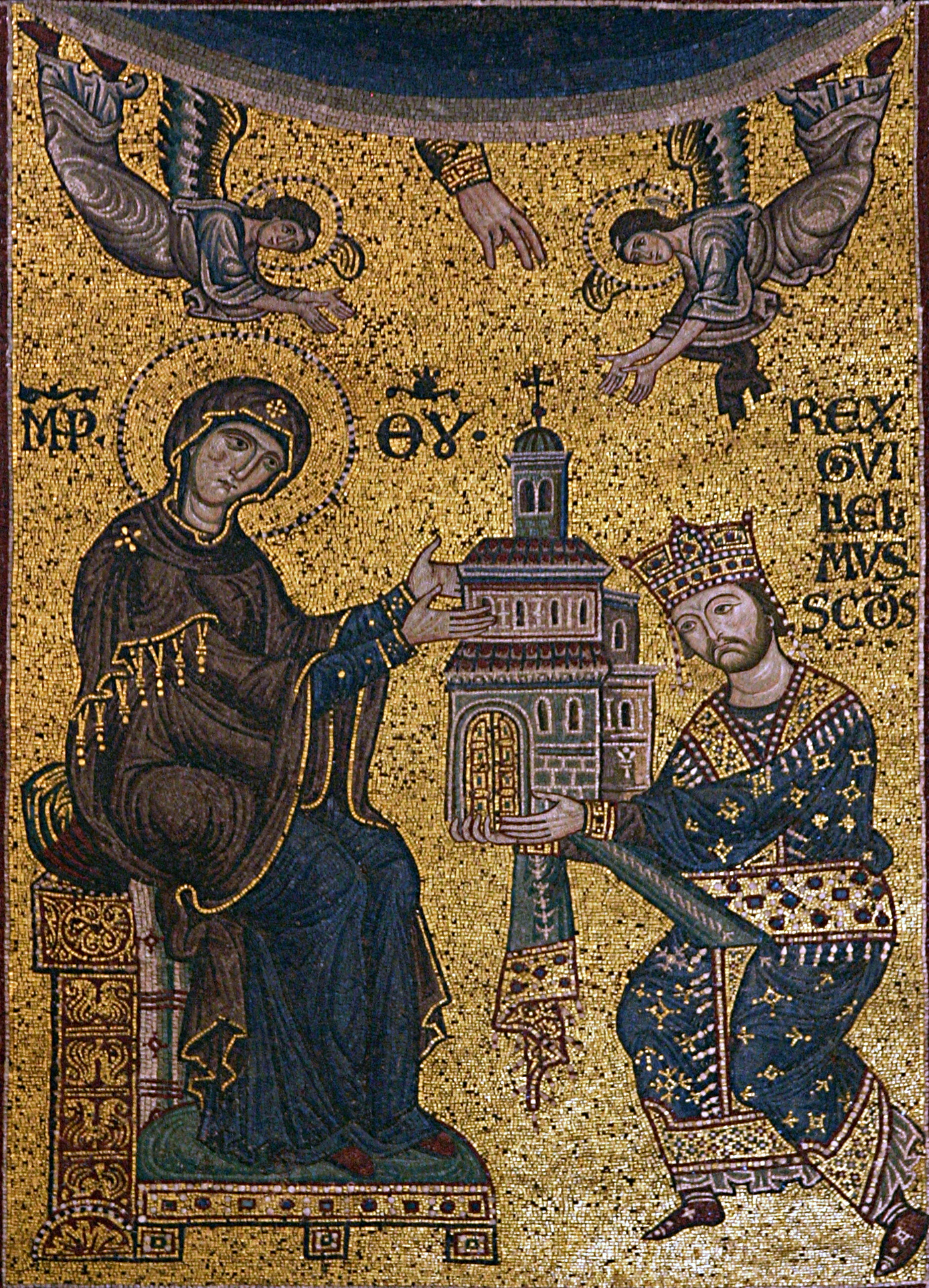
William II of Sicily offering the Monreale Cathedral to the Virgin Mary.

Some time after 1183 Gervase found service at the court of William II, the Norman king of Sicily, who had married Henry's daughter Joan. William gifted him a villa at Nola, in Campania. After the King of Sicily's death in 1189, Gervase moved to Arles and became a judge of canon law. In 1198, Otto – the Holy Roman Emperor after 1209– appointed Gervase Marshal of the Kingdom of Burgundy-Arles. Gervase married into a local family, and they bought him a palace. Gervase accompanied Otto to Rome in 1209 on the occasion of his Imperial coronation.

In 1210, Gervase was enmeshed in the papacy's struggle with his patron Otto, who was excommunicated by Pope Innocent III. Gervase spent the next years, from 1210 to 1214, writing the Otia Imperialia ("Recreation for an Emperor") for his patron. He also wrote a Vita abbreviata et miracula beatissimi Antonii ("Shortened life and miracles of the most blessed Antony") and a Liber de transitu beate virginis et gestis discipulorum ("Book of the passing of the blessed virgin and acts of the disciples").

Details of his latter years are uncertain. It has been suggested that, after the resounding defeat of Otto and his English ally John at the Battle of Bouvines (1214), Gervase was forced to retire to the duchy of Braunschweig, where he became provost of Ebstorf. He later died there. It is apparent that his work was known to the authors of the Ebstorf world map (c. 1234–40). (Note: The arguments for Gervase of Tilbury being the maker of the Ebstorf map are based on the name Gervase, which was an uncommon name in Northern Germany at the time and on some similarities between the world view of the mapmaker and Gervase of Tilbury. The editors of the Oxford Medieval Texts edition of Gervase of Tilbury's 'being the same man is an "attractive possibility", to accept it requires "too many improbable assumptions"'.) It is recorded by Ralph of Coggeshall that he became a canon in later life, and other evidence suggests that he may have been a member of the Premonstratensians of l'Huveaune.

== Bibliography ==
- Banks, S. E.; Binns, J. W., eds. (2002). Gervase of Tilbury: Otia Imperialia: Recreation for an Emperor. Oxford Medieval Texts. Oxford University Press. ISBN 0-19-820288-1.
- Davis, Henry William Carless (1911). "Gervase of Tilbury" . In Chisholm, Hugh (ed.). Encyclopædia Britannica. Vol. 11 (11th ed.). Cambridge University Press. pp. 907–908.
- P. E. Rook (2022). Man of Essex: Family Background and Early Life of Gervase of Tilbury 1020 - 1163.
- Wolf, Armin (2012). "The Ebstorf Mappamundi and Gervase of Tilbury: The Controversy Revisited". Imago Mundi. 64 (1): 1–27. doi:10.1080/03085694.2012.621392. ISSN 0308-5694.
