= List of legendary creatures (B) =

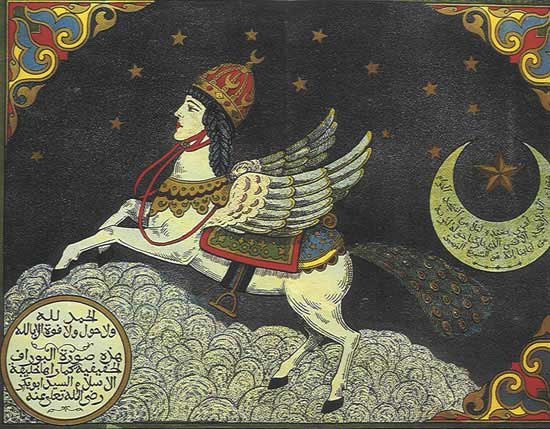
Buraq from a 17th-century Mughal miniature

1. Ba (Egyptian) – Soul of the deceased, depicted as a bird or a human-headed bird
2. Baba Yaga (Slavic) – Forest spirit and hag
3. Babi ngepet (Indonesia) – Monster boar
4. Baccoo (Guyanese/Surinamese) – Malevolent little people
5. Badalisc (Italian) – Goat-like creature from the southern central Alps
6. Bahamut (Arabian) – Very powerful dragon-like demon
7. Bai Ze (Chinese) – Talking beast which handed down knowledge on harmful spirits
8. Ba Jiao Gui (Chinese) – Banana tree spirit
9. Bak (Indian) – Assamese shape-shifting aqueous creature
10. Bake-kujira (Japanese) – Ghostly whale skeleton that drifts along the coastline of Shimane Prefecture
11. Bakeneko (Japanese) – Magical cat
12. Bakezōri (Japanese) – Animated straw sandal
13. Bakhtak (Iranian) – Night demon named Shaina
14. Baku (Japanese) – Dream-devouring, tapir-like creature
15. Bakunawa (Philippine) – Sea serpent that causes eclipses
16. Balaur (Romanian) – Multi-headed dragon
17. Baloz (Albanian) – Sea monster
18. Bannik (Slavic) – Bathhouse spirit
19. Banshee (Irish) – Screaming death spirit
20. Baobhan Sith (Celtic Mythology) – Beautiful vampiric seductresses who prey on young travelers
21. Bardha (Albanian) – Mountain spirit
22. Bardi (Trabzon) – Shapechanging death spirit
23. Barghest – Yorkshire black dog
24. Bar Juchne (Jewish) – Gigantic bird
25. Barnacle Geese (Medieval folklore) – Geese which hatch from barnacles
26. Barometz (Medieval folklore) – Plant-lamb hybrid
27. Barong (Balinese) – Tutelary spirit
28. Basajaun (Basque) – Ancestral, megalith-building race
29. Baš Čelik (Serbian) – Powerful, evil winged man whose soul is not held by his body and can be subdued only by causing him to suffer dehydration
30. Bashe (Chinese) – Elephant-swallowing serpent
31. Basilisco Chilote (Chilota) – Chicken-serpent hybrid
32. Basilisk (Italian) – Multi-limbed, venomous lizard
33. Basty (Turkic) - Evil spirit or goblin of bad dreams
34. Bathala (Philippine) – Primordial god of creation
35. Batibat (Philippine) – Female night-demon
36. Batsu (Chinese) – Drought spirit
37. Baubas (Lithuanian) – Malevolent spirit
38. Bauk (Slavic) – Darkness beast
39. Baykok (Ojibwa) – Flying skeleton
40. Beast of Bray Road (American Folklore) – Werewolf
41. Beast of Gévaudan (France) – French werewolf
42. Beast of the Earth
43. Bean Nighe (Irish) – Death spirit; a type of Banshee/Bean Sídhe)
44. Behemoth (Jewish) – Massive beast, possibly like a dinosaur or elephant
45. Bendigeidfran (Welsh) – Giant king
46. Bennu (Egyptian) – Heron-like, regenerative bird, equivalent to (or inspiration for) the Phoenix
47. Berehynia (Slavic) – Water spirit
48. Bergrisar (Norse) – Mountain giants who live alongside the Hrimthursar (lit. "Rime-Giants") in Jotunheim
49. Bergsrå (Norse) – Mountain spirit
50. Bestial beast (Brazilian) – Centauroid specter
51. Betobeto-san (Japanese) – Invisible spirit which follows people at night, making the sound of footsteps
52. Bhūta (Buddhist and Hindu) – Ghost of someone killed by execution or suicide
53. Bi-blouk (Khoikhoi) – Female, cannibalistic, partially invisible monster
54. Bicorn – Human-faced cow that feeds on good men
55. Bichura (Turkic) – House spirit that can take the form of cats or dogs
56. Bies (Slavic) – Demon
57. Bigfoot (American Folklore) – Forest-dwelling hominid cryptid.
58. Binbōgami (Japanese) – Spirit of poverty
59. Biscione (Heraldic) - Large grass snake
60. Bishop-fish (Medieval Bestiaries) – Fish-like humanoid
61. Biwa-bokuboku (Japanese) – Animated biwa
62. Bixi (Chinese) – Dragon with the shell of a turtle
63. Black Annis (English) – Blue-faced hag
64. Black Dog (British) – Canine death spirit
65. Black Lady of Bradley Woods (English) – Female ghost which reportedly haunts the woods near the village of Bradley, Lincolnshire, England
66. Black Shuck – Norfolk, Essex, and Suffolk black dog
67. Blafard – Imaginary creature from the early United States of America
68. Blemmyae (Medieval Bestiary) – Headless humanoid with face in torso
69. Bloody Bones – Water bogeyman
70. Błudnik (Slavic) – Mischievous gnome
71. Blue Crow (Brazilian) – Giant amazonian bird
72. Bluecap (English) – Mine-dwelling fairy
73. Bodach (Scottish) – Malevolent spirit
74. Bogeyman (English) – Malevolent spirit
75. Boggart (English) – Malevolent household spirit
76. Boginki (Slavic) – Nature spirit
77. Bogle (Scottish) – Malevolent spirit
78. Boi-tatá (Brazilian) – Giant snake
79. Bolla (Albanian) – Dragon
80. Bolotnik (Slavic) – Male swamp spirit
81. Bonnacon (Medieval Bestiaries) – Bull-horse hybrid with flaming dung
82. Boo Hag (American Folklore) – Vampire-like creature that steals energy from sleeping victims
83. Boobrie (Scottish) – Roaring water bird
84. Boroboroton (Japanese) – Animated futon
85. Bozaloshtsh (Slavic) – Death spirit
86. Brag (English) – Malevolent water horse
87. British big cat (English) – mysterious black panther
88. Brownie (English and Scottish) – Benevolent household spirit
89. Broxa (Jewish) – Nocturnal bird that drains goats of their milk
90. Bucca (Cornish) – Male sea-spirit, a merman, that inhabited mines and coastal communities as a hobgoblin during storms
91. Bokkenrijders (Dutch) – Ghosts/devils riding flying goats; co-opted by bandits to instil fear during raids
92. Bugbear (English) – Bearlike goblin
93. Buggane (Manx) – Ogre-like humanoid
94. Bugul Noz (Celtic) – Extremely ugly, but kind, forest spirit
95. Bukavac (Serbia) – Six-legged lake monster
96. Bulgae (Korean) – Fire dog
97. Bunyip (Australian Aboriginal) – Horse-walrus hybrid lake monster
98. Bunny Man (American Folklore) Virginia, Maryland, and Washington, D.C. Urban Legend – Spirit/Maniac that wears a bunny costume and wields an ax
99. Bush Dai Dai (Guyanese) – Spirit that seduces and kills men
100. Byangoma (Bengali) – Fortune-telling birds
101. Bysen (Scandinavian) – Diminutive forest spirit
