= Blood (disambiguation) =

Blood is a biological fluid found in animals.

Blood may also refer to:

== Places ==
- Blood Falls, a geological feature at the Taylor Glacier in Antarctica
- Blood Mountain, Georgia, US
- Blood River, KwaZulu-Natal, South Africa

== People ==
- Blood (surname), various people with the last name
- Johnny Blood, name under which American football player John Victor McNally Jr. (1903–1985) played
- James Blood Ulmer (born 1942), also known as "Blood" Ulmer, American jazz and blues guitarist and singer
- Black Blood, later stage name for American professional wrestler Billy Jack Haynes (born 1953)

== Arts and entertainment ==
=== Fictional characters ===
- Baron Blood, several Marvel Comics characters
- Brother Blood, two comic book characters in the DC Universe
- Jason Blood, a DC Comics character
- Peter Blood, in the novel Captain Blood and associated short stories and in the film adaptation starring Errol Flynn
- Blood (Transformers), from the Transformers universe
- Blood, the dog in A Boy and His Dog

=== Film ===
- Blood (1989 film), also called O Sangue, a Portuguese drama directed by Pedro Costa
- Blood (2000 film), a British horror film directed by Charly Cantor
- Blood (2004 film), a Canadian drama directed by Jerry Ciccoritti
- Blood (2009 film), a Japanese supernatural action film directed by Ten Shimoyama
- Blood (2012 film), a British thriller directed by Nick Murphy
- Blood (2022 film), an American thriller directed by Brad Anderson
- The Blood (film), a 1922 German silent film directed by Paul Legband
- Blood: The Last Vampire, a 2000 anime film
  - Blood: The Last Vampire (2009 film), a live-action version of the anime film Blood: The Last Vampire
- Raktham – The Blood, a 2019 Indian film

=== Literature ===
- Blood (Birch novel), by Australian author Tony Birch
- Blood (Shillitoe novel), 2002, by Tony Shillitoe
- Blood, an autobiography by Jack Youngblood
- Blood: A Southern Fantasy, a novel by Michael Moorcock
- Blood: A Tale, a comic book mini-series written by J. M. DeMatteis
- Bloods: An Oral History of the Vietnam War by Black Veterans, a 1984 book by Wallace Terry

=== Music ===
==== Groups ====
- Blood (band), a Japanese gothic rock band
- Blood, a production duo composed of Jerome Fontamillas and Jyro Xhan
- The Blood (band), a British punk band

==== Albums ====
- Blood (Pulled Apart by Horses album), 2014, by Pulled Apart by Horses
- Blood (EP), 2003, by Polish band Vader
- Blood (Franz Ferdinand album), 2009, by the Scottish band Franz Ferdinand
- Blood (Juliana Hatfield album), 2021, by American musician Juliana Hatfield
- Blood (In This Moment album), 2012, by American band In This Moment
- Blood (Lianne La Havas album), 2015, by Lianne La Havas
- Blood (The Microphones album), 2001, by The Microphones
- Blood (OSI album), 2009, by OSI
- Blood (Project Pitchfork album), 2014, by Project Pitchfork
- Blood (Rhye album), 2018, by Rhye
- Blood (Stan Ridgway and Pietra Wexstun album), 2003, by Stan Ridgway and Pietra Wexstun
- Blood (This Mortal Coil album), 1991, by This Mortal Coil
- The Blood (album), 2007, by Christian music artist Kevin Max

==== Songs ====
- "Blood" (Editors song), 2005, by the British indie rock band Editors
- "Blood" (Kendrick Lamar song), 2017, by American rapper Kendrick Lamar
- "Blood" (Pearl Jam song), 1993, by the American band Pearl Jam
- "Blood" (In This Moment song), 2012, by the American band In This Moment
- "Blood" (My Chemical Romance song), 2006, by the rock quintet My Chemical Romance
- "Blood", by Algiers from Algiers
- "Blood", by Anthrax from Persistence of Time
- "Blood", by Bad Omens from Finding God Before God Finds Me
- "Blood", by Breaking Benjamin from Ember
- "Blood", by Candiria from What Doesn't Kill You...
- "Blood", by Coheed and Cambria from Vaxis – Act II: A Window of the Waking Mind
- "Blood", by Dropkick Murphys from 11 Short Stories of Pain & Glory
- "Blood", by Dry Cleaning from Secret Love
- "Blood", by Faster Pussycat from Between the Valley of the Ultra Pussy
- "Blood", by Faith No More from Introduce Yourself
- "Blood", by Loop from A Gilded Eternity
- "Blood", by Pestilence from Testimony of the Ancients
- "Blood", by Priestess from Hello Master
- "Blood", by Queensrÿche from Tribe
- "Blood", by Sonata Arctica from Pariah's Child
- "Blood", by Tindersticks from their 1993 self-titled debut album
- "Blood", by Triple J band The Middle East from the EP The Recordings of the Middle East

=== Television ===
==== Series ====
- Blood+, a 2006 anime television series based on the movie Blood: The Last Vampire
- Blood-C, a 2011 anime television series based on the movie Blood: The Last Vampire
- Blood (South Korean TV series), a 2015 South Korean television series
- Blood (2018 TV series), an Irish psychological thriller
- Bloods (TV series), a 2021 comedy series

==== Episodes ====
- "Blood" (The X-Files), 1994
- "Blood" (Black Books), 2002
- "Blood", an episode of The Protector
- "The Blood" (Seinfeld), 1997

=== Other uses in arts and entertainment ===
- Blood (video game), 1997, developed by Monolith Productions
  - Blood II: The Chosen, 1998 sequel to Blood developed by Monolith Productions
- "Blood", a season 3 episode of Theme Time Radio Hour
- Blood, another name for penny dreadful literature

== Sports ==
- Sydney Swans (South Melbourne Football Club), formerly nicknamed "Bloods"
- West Adelaide Football Club, nicknamed "Bloods"

== Other uses ==
- Bloods, a street gang founded in Los Angeles, California
- Blood (journal), a medical hematology journal
- Blood (automobile), a car manufactured in the US from 1902 to 1905
- Blood Tribe, or Kainai Nation, a Native American tribe in Alberta, Canada

== See also ==
- Bloody (disambiguation)
- Blud, a fairy in Slavic mythology
- Major Bludd, a fictional character from the G.I. Joe: A Real American Hero franchise
