= The Blood =

The Blood may refer to:

- The Blood of Christ
- The Blood (band), an English punk rock band
- The Blood (Seinfeld), an episode of the American sitcom Seinfeld
- The Blood (album), a 2007 album by Kevin Max
- The Blood (film), a 1922 German silent film
- The Blood, a song by The Cure from the album The Head on the Door

== See also ==
- Blood (disambiguation)
