= Michigan (1903 automobile) =

Defunct American motor vehicle manufacturer

Michigan Automobile Company, LTD
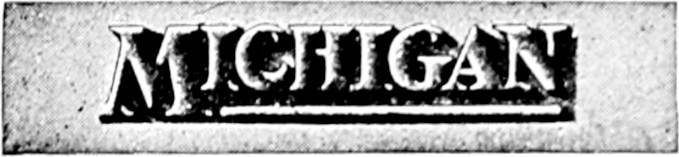
- Formerly: Fuller Brothers Manufacturing Company
- Company type: Automobile manufacturer
- Industry: Automotive
- Founded: 1903; 123 years ago
- Defunct: 1907; 119 years ago
- Fate: changed name
- Successor: Fuller & Sons Manufacturing Company
- Headquarters: Kalamazoo, Michigan
- Products: Automobiles

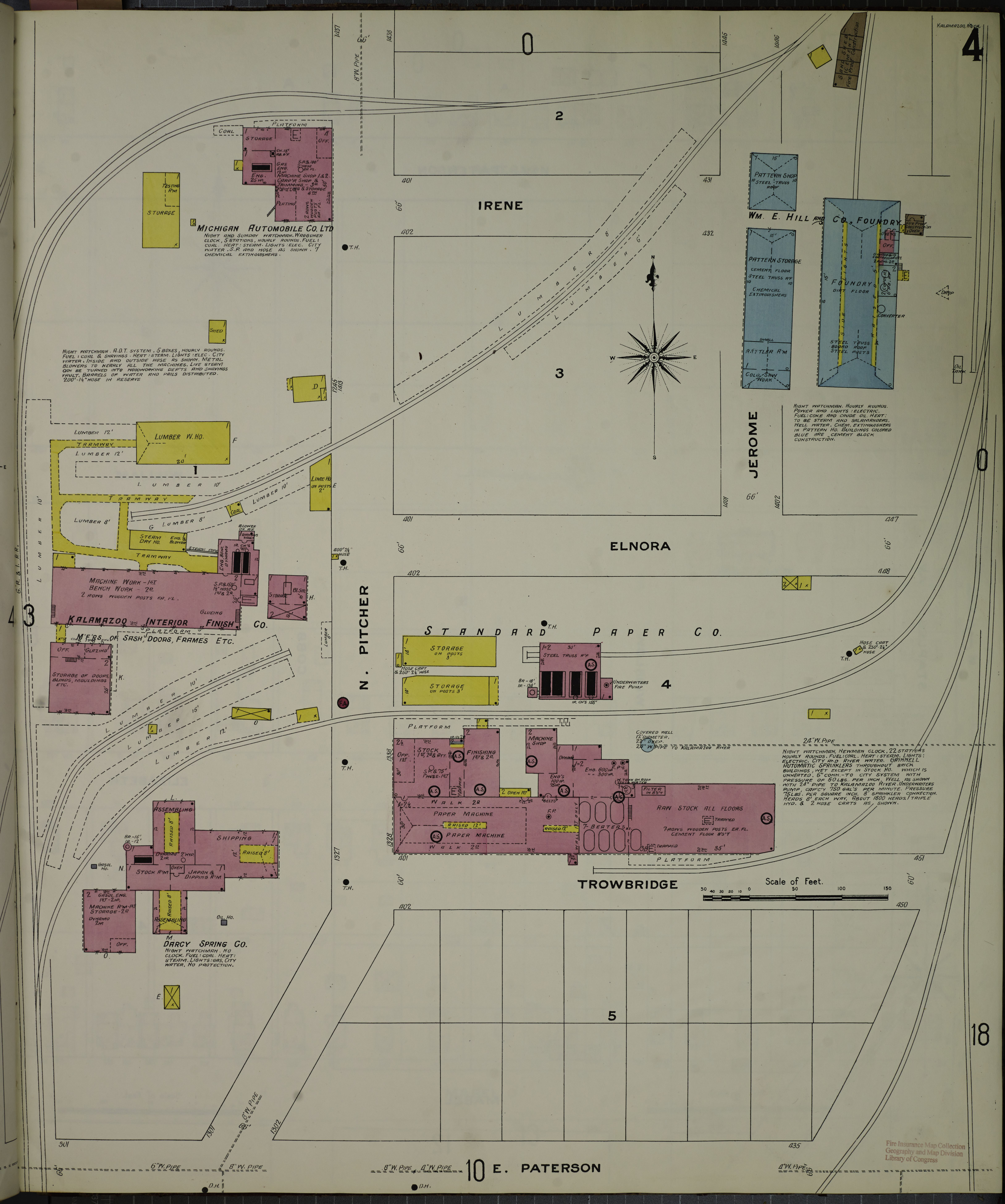
Michigan Automobile Company, LTD plant (1908)

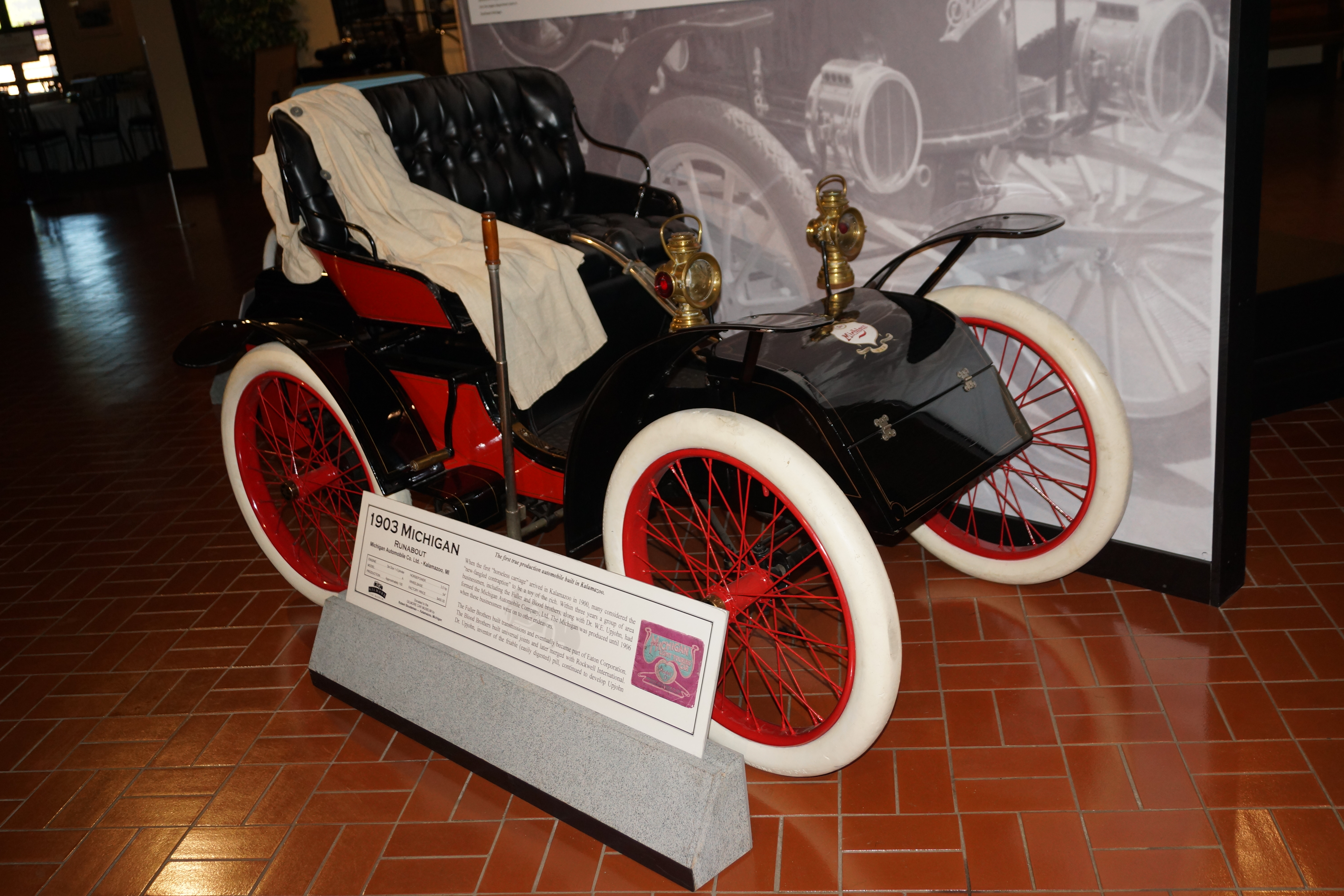
A 1903 Michigan Model A, at the Gilmore Car Museum

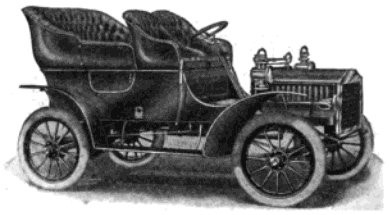
1905 Michigan Model E - Side Entrance Tonneau

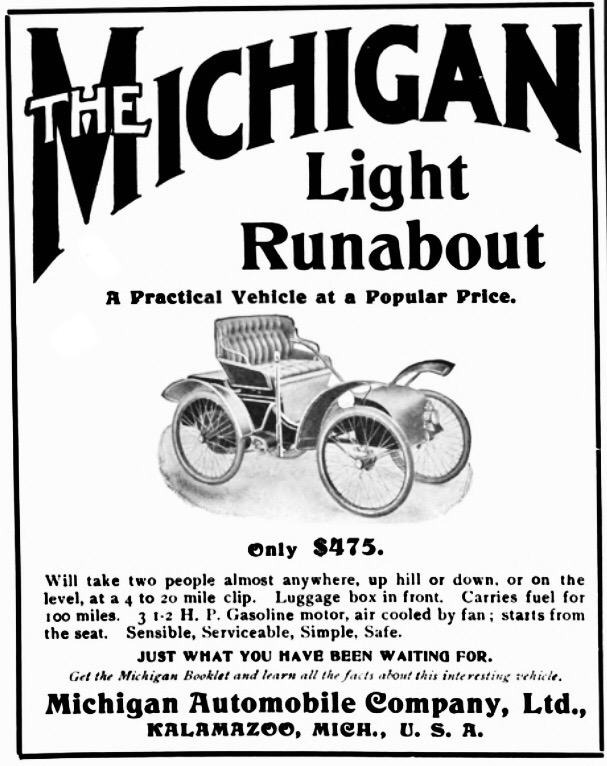
Michigan Model A (1903-1904)

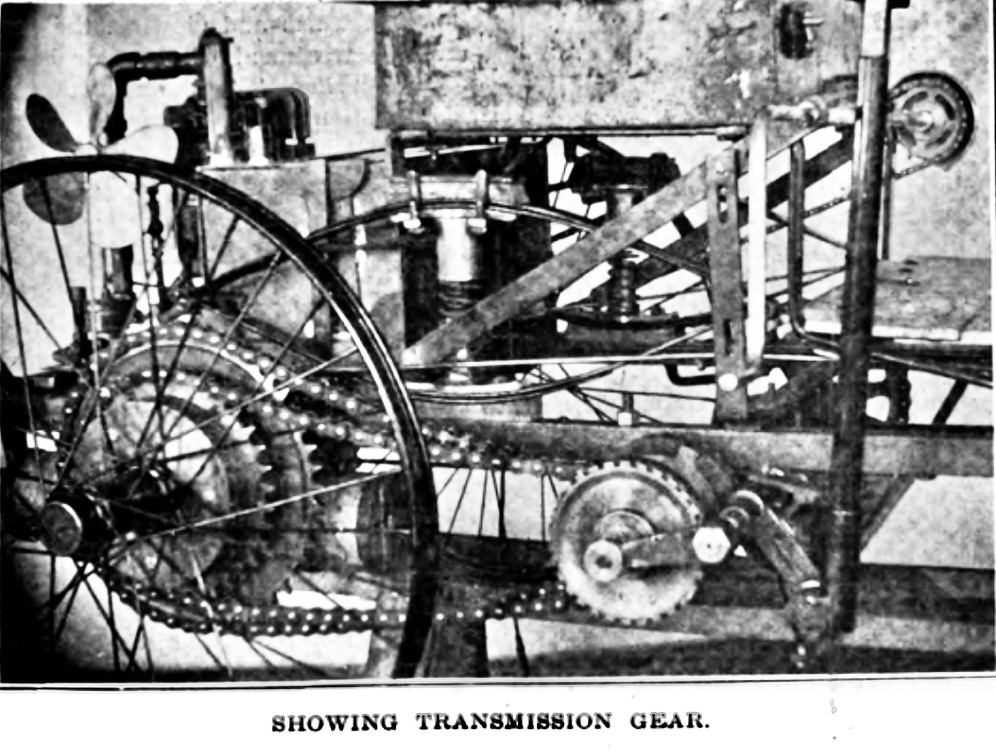
Michigan Model A Transmission Gear

The Michigan was a brass era automobile built in Kalamazoo, Michigan by the Michigan Automobile Company, Ltd from 1903 to 1907.

== History ==
The Fuller brothers, Charles D. and Frank D. owned the Fuller Brothers Manufacturing Company that made washboards and other wood products. Negotiating with the Blood brothers, owners of the Kalamazoo Cycle Company and builders of a prototype car, they decided to go into automobile manufacturing. On December, 30th, 1902, they established the Michigan Automobile Company, LTD, Charles Fuller as chairman, Frank Fuller as secretary and general manager, Maurice E. Blood as treasurer, and Charles C. Blood as superintendent.

A business dispute resulted in the Blood brothers leaving the company at the end of 1904. The Bloods set up production of their own car and the Blood automobile was identical with the last car they developed for Michigan.

The Bloods quit building automobiles (for a decade) in 1905 and built automobile parts instead. The Michigan was continued into 1907 when the Fuller brothers followed the Bloods into automobile parts. As Fuller and Sons Manufacturing Company, they made transmissions and clutches.

== Models ==
The Bloods small prototype car, was a two-passenger runabout with a wheelbase of just 48 in., a steering lever and an air-cooled, single-cylinder engine that delivered 3.5 horsepower. The engine displacement of the single-cylinder engine was 476 cc with a bore of 82.55 mm and a stroke of 88.9 mm. For production, a longer frame with a wheelbase of 54 in. was used. It was marketed as the Model A runabout, priced at $450 (equivalent to $16,125 in 2025) and weighing only 360 pounds. About 100 cars were built by 1904.

A larger car, Model C, was added in 1904. It had a 2-cylinder engine that developed 12 hp, a wheelbase of 78 in., a steering wheel but the engine still placed under the seat. Available as a Light Touring, similar to a detachable Tonneau, the price was $900.

The Bloods designed two more 2-cylinder cars that were introduced in 1905. Model D with the 12 hp engine, wheelbase of 80 in. and Demi Tonneau body was priced at $1,100. For $150 more, a larger Model E was offered with 16 hp engine, and a 90 in.wheelbase. From 1906, Model E remained available priced at $1,500 (equivalent to $53,750 in 2025) until end of production in 1907.

== See also ==
- Brass Era car
- List of defunct United States automobile manufacturers
- Michigan Model A at Conceptcarz.com
