= Sarimanok =

Philippine mythical creature

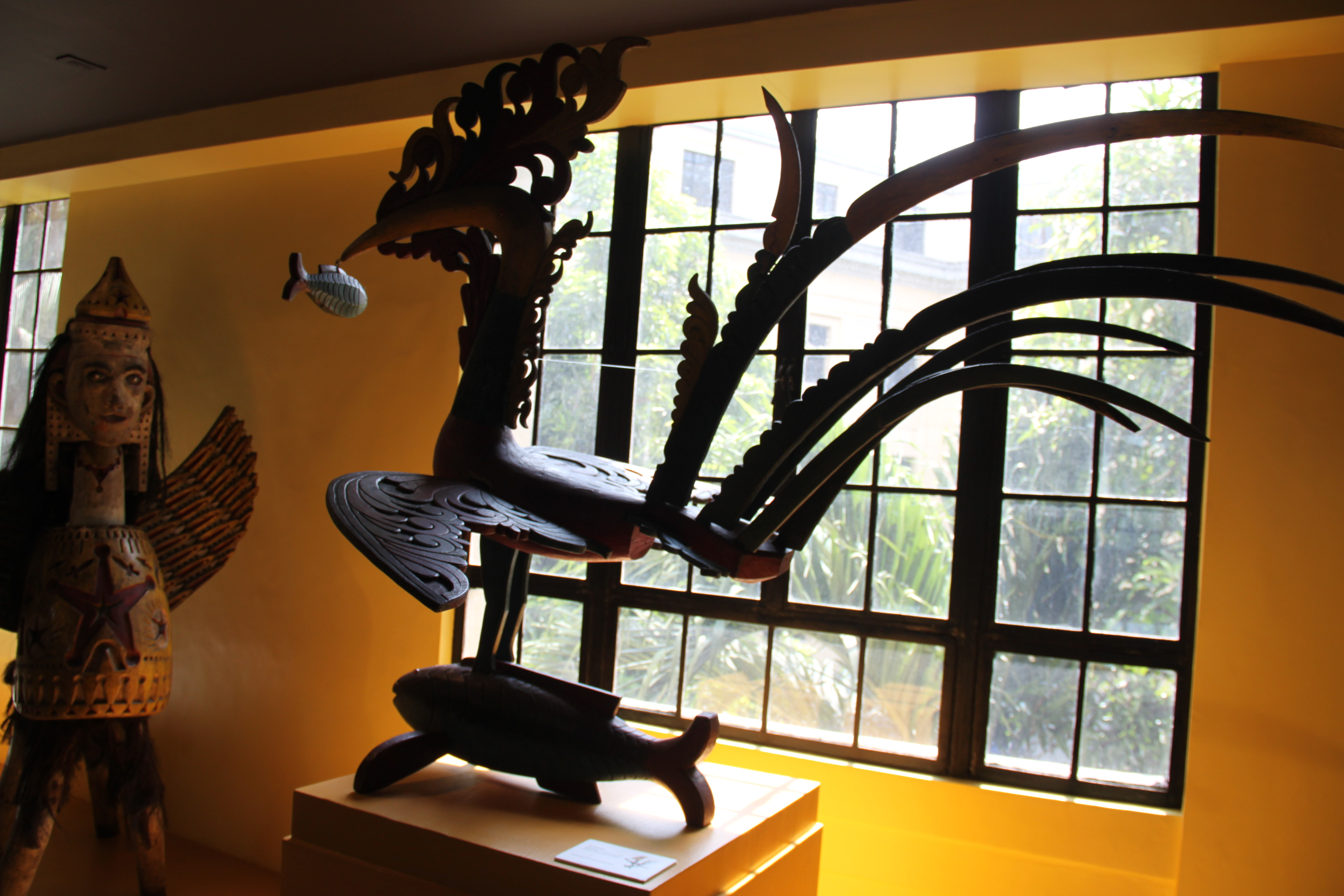

Creature information
- Other name(s): Papanoka "Mra" "Mara patik"
- Grouping: Mythical creature
- Similar entities: Víðópnir; Simurgh

Origin
- Country: Philippines
- Region: Mindanao

The Sarimanok (Pronunciation: sá·ri·ma·nók), also known as papanok in its feminine form, is a legendary bird of the Maranao people, who originate from Mindanao, an island in the Philippines, and part of Philippine mythology. It comes from the words sari and manok. Sari means "assorted" or "various", while manok originally meant "bird" as evidenced by early Spanish colonial sources, but came to mean only "chicken", which is how it is understood today (i.e. the creature is a "bird/chicken of assorted colors").

== Description ==
The Sarimanok is the legendary bird that has become a ubiquitous symbol of Maranao art. It is portrayed as a fowl with colorful wings and a feathered tail, carrying a fish in its beak or talons. The head is profusely decorated with scroll, leaf, and spiral motifs. It is said to be a symbol of good fortune.

== Origin ==
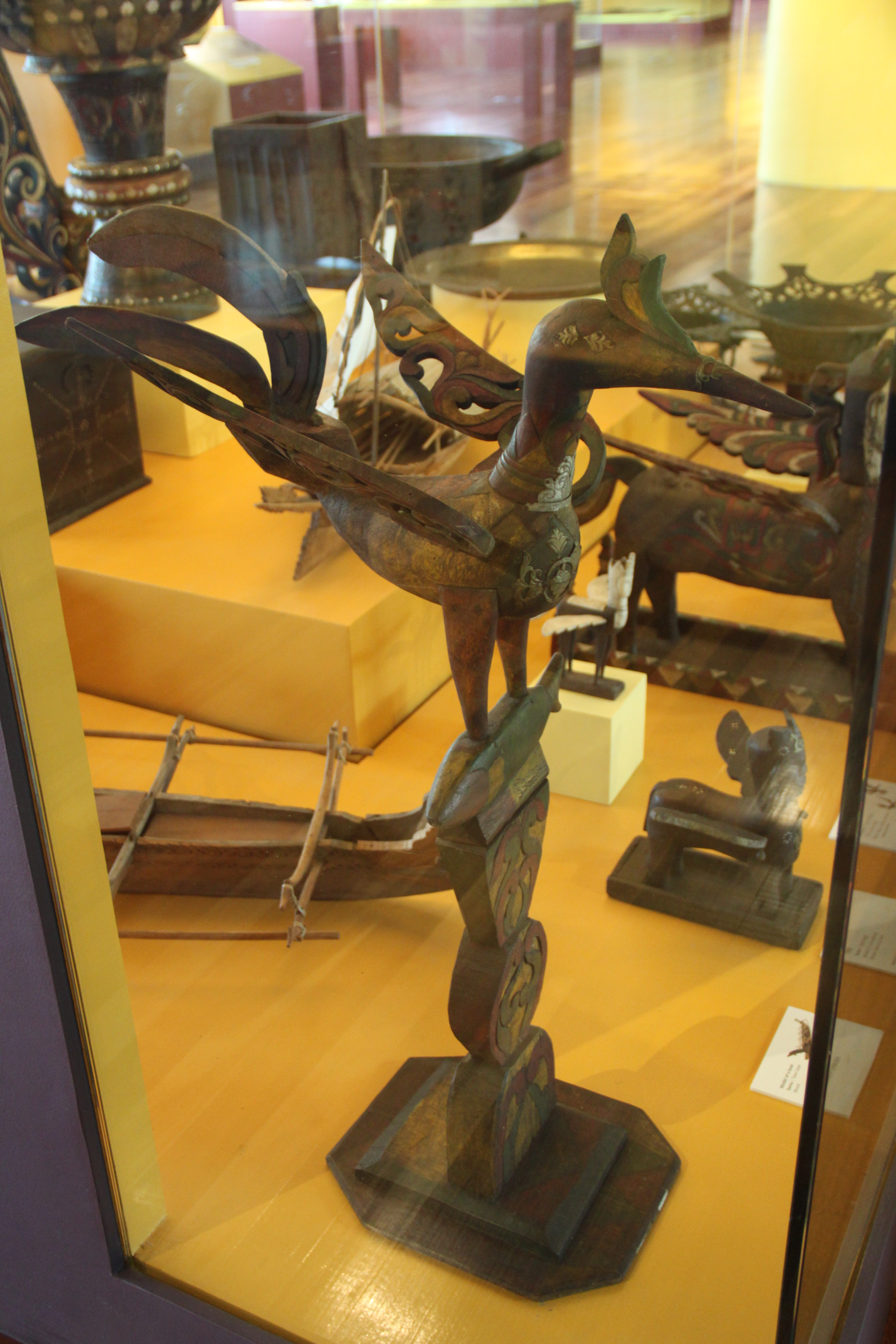
A sarimanok carving

The Sarimanok is derived from a totem bird of the Maranao people, called Itotoro. According to the Maranao people, the Itotoro is a medium to the spirit world through its unseen twin spirit bird called Inikadowa.

According to the later Islamic legend, Muhammad found a rooster in the first of the seven heavens. The bird was so large its crest touched the second heaven. Its crow roused every living creature except man. The Day of Resurrection would come once this celestial rooster ceased to crow.

== Cultural significance ==
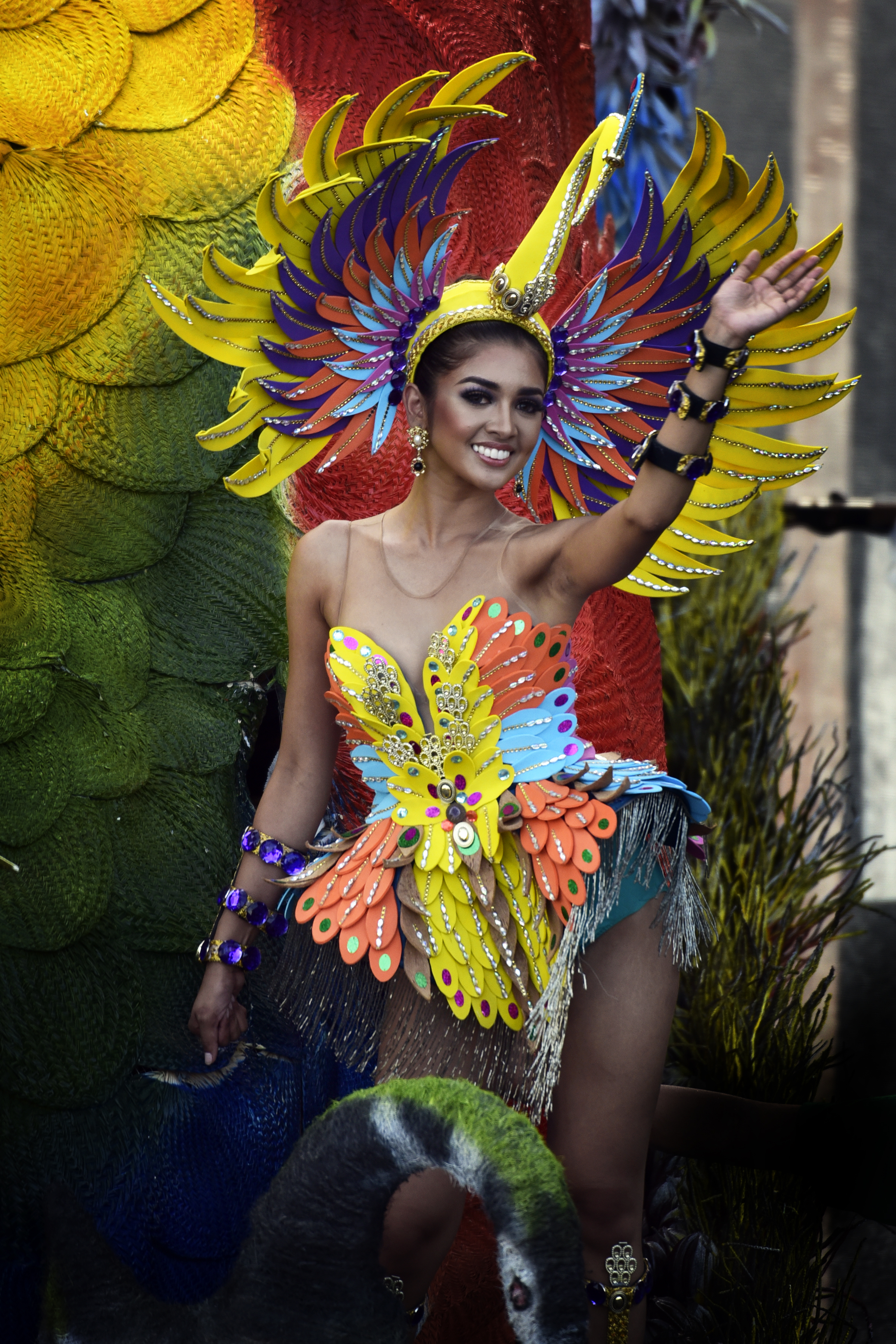
Sarimanok inspired costume in Aliwan 2019

According to the tradition, the sarimanok is never displayed by itself. It must be displayed with the set of flags, standards and vexilloids. At present, this is not totally true; sarimanok may be placed on the top of the umbrella of a Sultan or dignitary, and also, the Mindanao State University has adopted it for the graduation exercises following a non-traditional use.

Philippine National Artist for Visual Arts Abdulmari Asia Imao uses the Sarimanok as a motif for some of his artworks which helped popularize the creature.

The Far Eastern University seal bears the FEU Coat of Arms and the sarimanok motif. The FEU Coat of arms consists of eight-pointed golden star that represents the first eight main disciplines of FEU. The sarimanok is a legendary bird in full color that projects the nationalistic spirit upon which the university is founded. The university wanted to have a Filipino touch in everything because they were one of the first universities in the Philippines to be founded by a Filipino, Dr. Nicanor Reyes, Sr.

The Philippine television network ABS-CBN used the Sarimanok in the network's 1993 station ID and served as the network's mascot from 1993 until 2000. It was first used during its color broadcasts in November 1966, similar to how NBC of the United States first created its official peacock logo in 1956 for its color broadcasts. The Sarimanok was re-used in 2004 on plugs of its regional broadcasts. The ABS-CBN News Channel was also initially launched as the Sarimanok News Channel in 1996 and used the name until 1999.

The Philippine float entry for the 1998 Tournament of Roses Parade featured a giant 55-foot Sarimanok which also won the "Most Beautiful Float from Outside the USA” honors.

The Sarimanok was also the logo of Spirit of Manila Airlines, a short-lived airline which only lasted from 2011 to 2012.

P-pop group Bini donned a Sarimanok-inspired outfit for their performance at the Summer Sonic Festival 2026.

== See also ==
- List of Philippine mythological creatures
  - Minokawa
  - Garuda
  - Ibong Adarna
- Fenghuang
- Simurgh
- Phoenix
- Bar Juchne
- Okir
- Sarimanok (vinta)
