= Mythology of Italy =

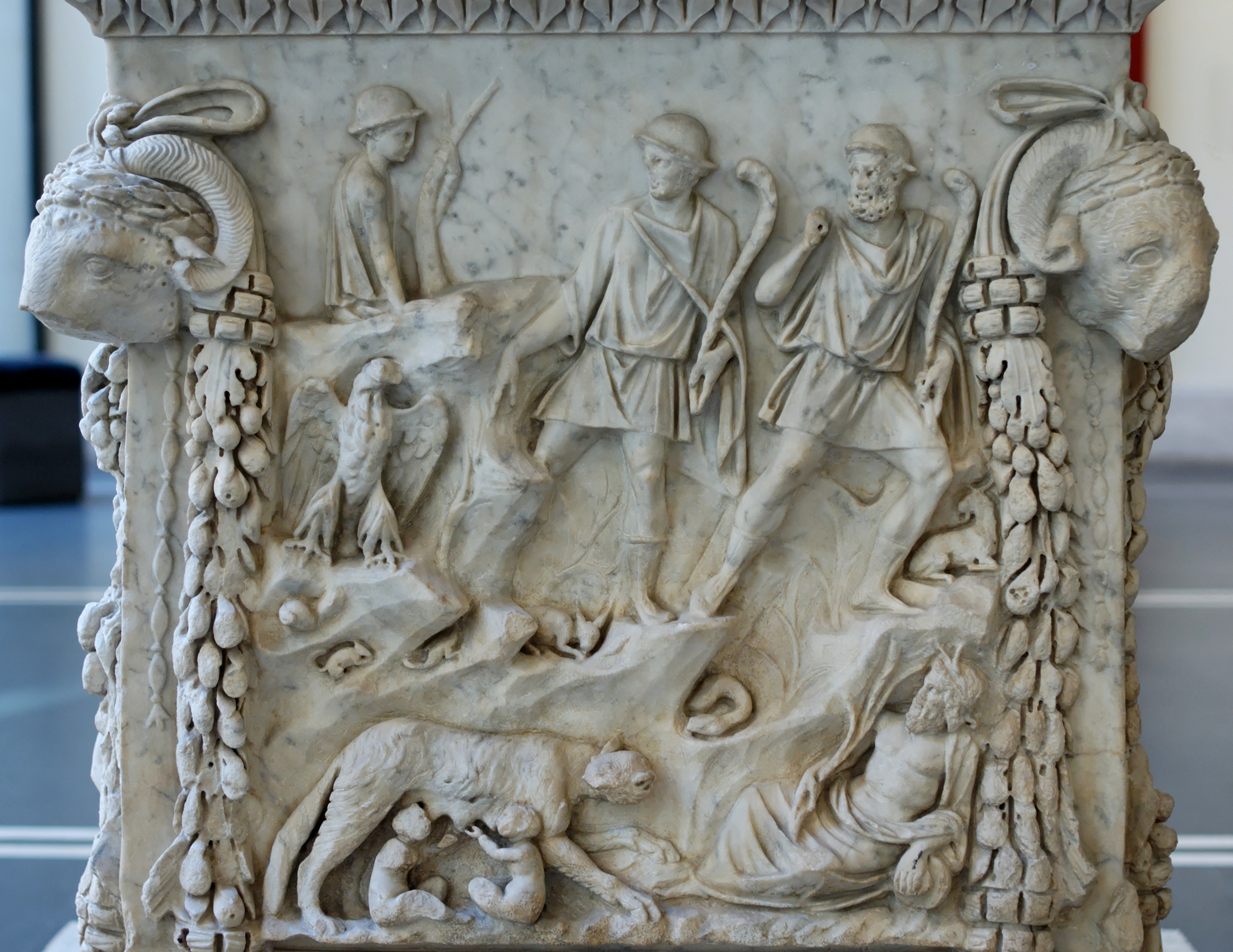
Romulus and Remus, the Lupercal, Father Tiber, and the Palatine on a relief from a pedestal dating to the reign of Trajan (AD 98–117)

The mythologies in present-day Italy encompass the mythology of the Romans, Etruscans, and other peoples living in Italy, those ancient stories about divine or heroic beings that these particular cultures believed to be true and that often use supernatural events or characters to explain the nature of the universe and humanity.

== Roman mythology ==
Roman mythology is the body of myths of ancient Rome as represented in the literature and visual arts of the Romans. One of a wide variety of genres of Roman folklore, Roman mythology may also refer to the modern study of these representations, and to the subject matter as represented in the literature and art of other cultures in any period. Roman mythology draws from the mythology of the Italic peoples and ultimately from Proto-Indo-European mythology.

Roman mythology also draws directly on Greek mythology, potentially as early as Rome's protohistory, but primarily during the Hellenistic period of Greek influence and through the Roman conquest of Greece, via the artistic imitation of Greek literary models by Roman authors. The Romans identified their own gods with those of the ancient Greeks—who were closely historically related in some cases, such as Zeus and Jupiter—and reinterpreted myths about Greek deities under the names of their Roman counterparts. Greek and Roman mythologies are therefore often classified together in the modern era as Greco-Roman mythology.

Latin literature was widely known in Europe throughout the Middle Ages and into the Renaissance. The interpretations of Greek myths by the Romans often had a greater influence on narrative and pictorial representations of "Greco-Roman mythology" than Greek sources. In particular, the versions of Greek myths in Ovid's Metamorphoses, written during the reign of Augustus, came to be regarded as canonical.

=== Nature of Roman myth ===
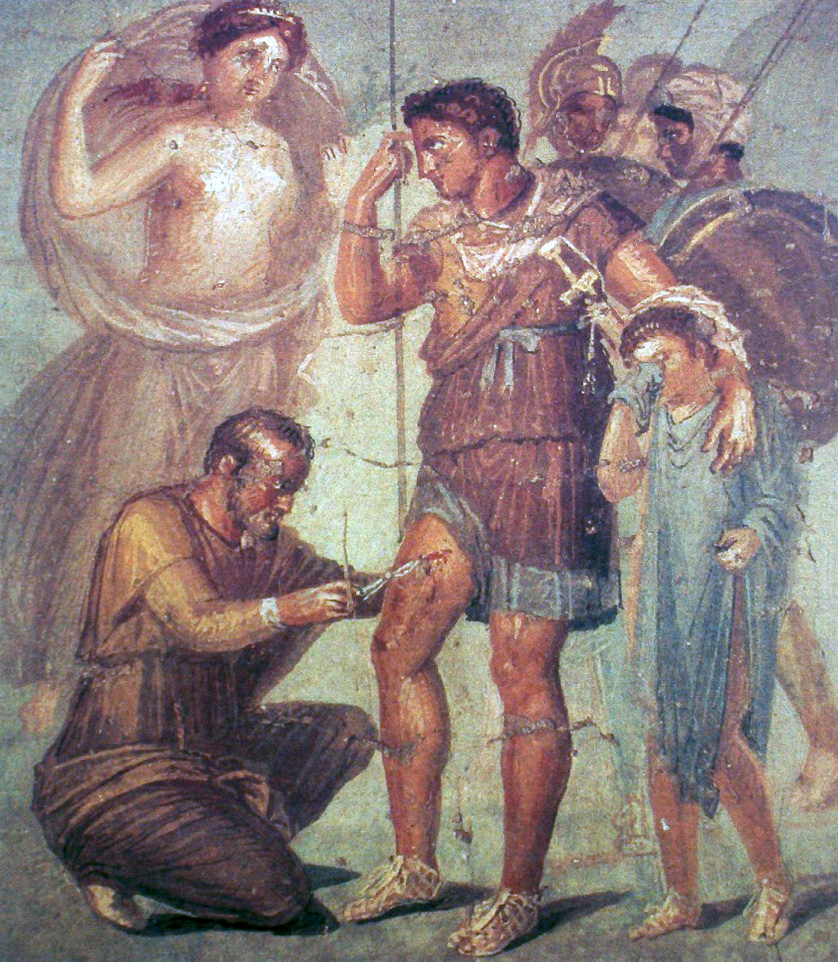
In this wall painting from Pompeii, Venus looks on while the physician Iapyx tends to the wound of her son, Aeneas; the tearful boy is her grandson Ascanius, also known as Iulus, legendary ancestor of Julius Caesar and the Julio-Claudian dynasty

Because ritual played the central role in Roman religion that myth did for the Greeks, it is sometimes doubted that the Romans had much of a native mythology. This perception is a product of Romanticism and the classical scholarship of the 19th century, which valued Greek civilization as more "authentically creative." From the Renaissance to the 18th century, however, Roman myths were an inspiration particularly for European painting. The Roman tradition is rich in historical myths, or legends, concerning the foundation and rise of the city. These narratives focus on human actors, with only occasional intervention from deities but a pervasive sense of divinely ordered destiny. In Rome's earliest period, history and myth have a mutual and complementary relationship. As T. P. Wiseman notes:

The Roman stories still matter, as they mattered to Dante in 1300 and Shakespeare in 1600 and the founding fathers of the United States in 1776. What does it take to be a free citizen? Can a superpower still be a republic? How does well-meaning authority turn into murderous tyranny?

Major sources for Roman myth include the Aeneid of Virgil and the first few books of Livy's history as well as Dionysius's Roman Antiquities. Other important sources are the Fasti of Ovid, a six-book poem structured by the Roman religious calendar, and the fourth book of elegies by Propertius. Scenes from Roman myth also appear in Roman wall painting, coins, and sculpture, particularly reliefs.

=== Founding myths ===
The Aeneid and Livy's early history are the best extant sources for Rome's founding myths. Material from Greek heroic legend was grafted onto this native stock at an early date. The Trojan prince Aeneas was cast as husband of Lavinia, daughter of King Latinus, patronymical ancestor of the Latini, and therefore through a convoluted revisionist genealogy as forebear of Romulus and Remus. By extension, the Trojans were adopted as the mythical ancestors of the Roman people.

=== Other myths ===
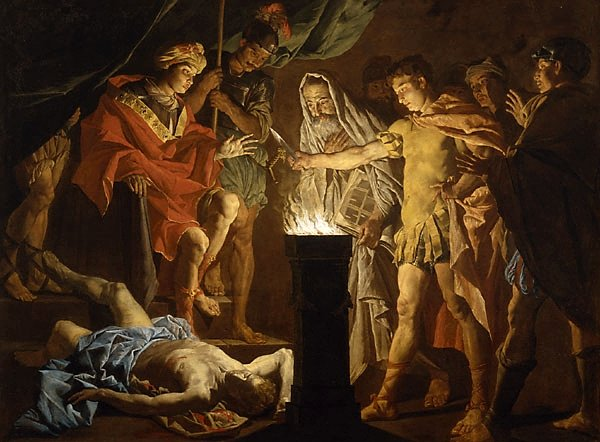
Mucius Scaevola in the Presence of Lars Porsenna (early 1640s) by Matthias Stom

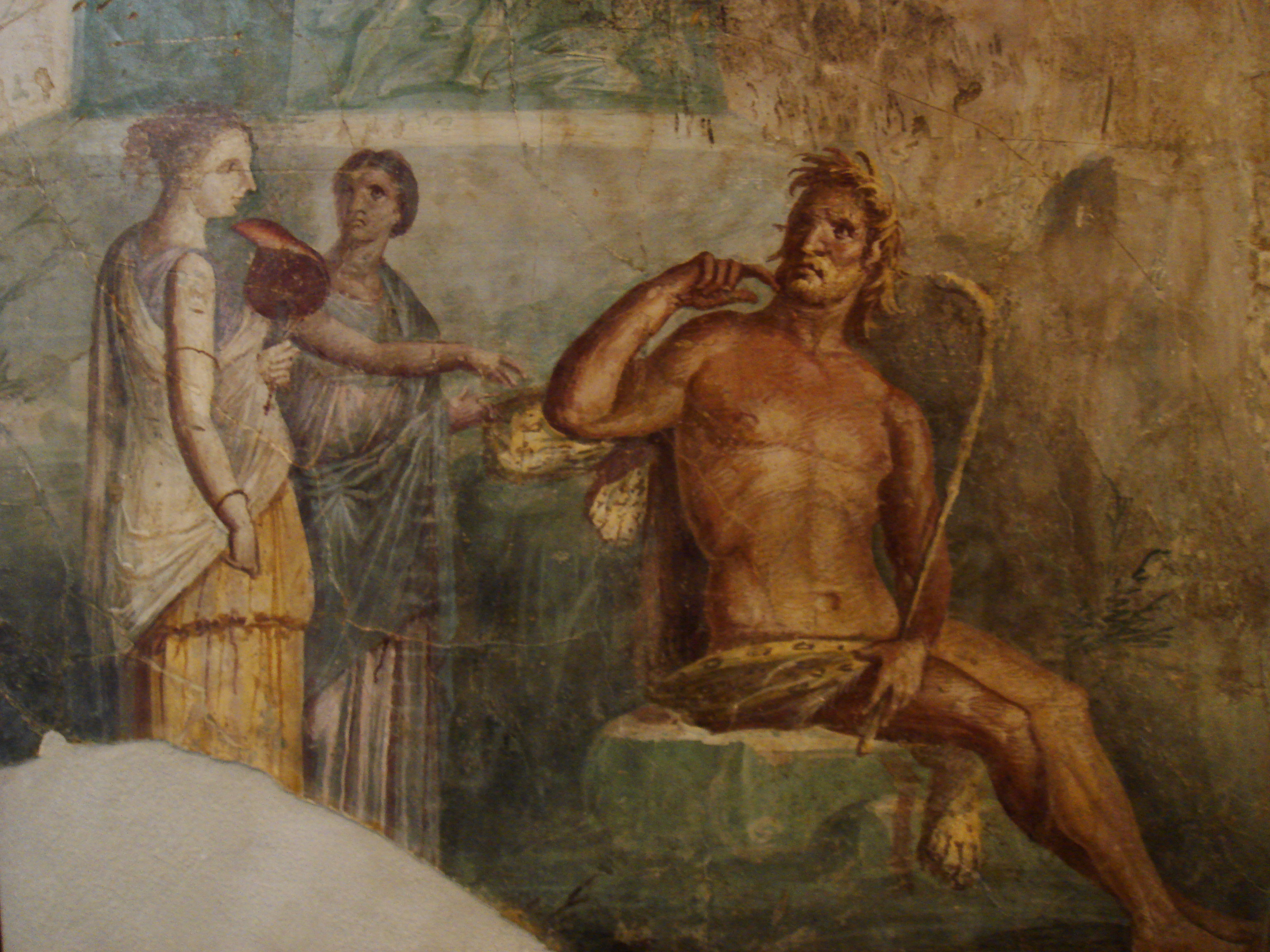
Polyphemus hears of the arrival of Galatea; ancient Roman fresco painted in the "Fourth Style" of Pompeii (45–79 AD)

The characteristic myths of Rome are often political or moral, that is, they deal with the development of Roman government in accordance with divine law, as expressed by Roman religion, and with demonstrations of the individual's adherence to moral expectations (mos maiorum) or failures to do so.

- Rape of the Sabine women, explaining the importance of the Sabines in the formation of Roman culture, and the growth of Rome through conflict and alliance.
- Numa Pompilius, the Sabine second king of Rome who consorted with the nymph Egeria and established many of Rome's legal and religious institutions.
- Servius Tullius, the sixth king of Rome, whose mysterious origins were freely mythologized and who was said to have been the lover of the goddess Fortuna.
- The Tarpeian Rock, and why it was used for the execution of traitors.
- Lucretia, whose self-sacrifice prompted the overthrow of the early Roman monarchy and led to the establishment of the Republic.
- Cloelia, a Roman woman taken hostage by Lars Porsena. She escaped the Clusian camp with a group of Roman virgins.
- Horatius at the bridge, on the importance of individual valor.
- Mucius Scaevola, who thrust his right hand into the fire to prove his loyalty to Rome.
- Caeculus and the founding of Praeneste.
- Manlius and the geese, about divine intervention at the Gallic siege of Rome.
- Stories pertaining to the Nonae Caprotinae and Poplifugia festivals.
- Coriolanus, a story of politics and morality.
- The Etruscan city of Corythus as the "cradle" of Trojan and Italian civilization.
- The arrival of the Great Mother (Cybele) in Rome.

== Etruscan mythology ==
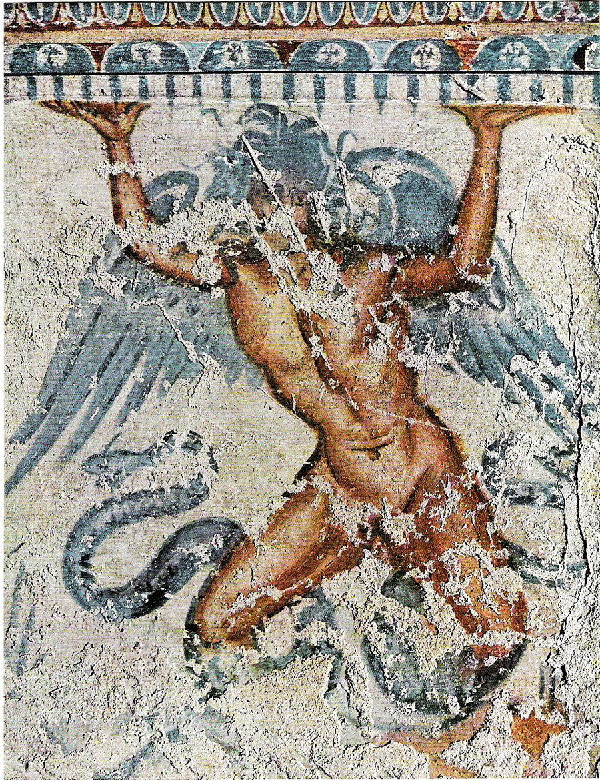
Etruscan mural of Typhon, from Tarquinia

Etruscan religion comprises a set of stories, beliefs, and religious practices of the Etruscan civilization, heavily influenced by the mythology of ancient Greece, and sharing similarities with concurrent Roman mythology and religion. As the Etruscan civilization was gradually assimilated into the Roman Republic from the 4th century BC, the Etruscan religion and mythology were partially incorporated into ancient Roman culture, following the Roman tendency to absorb some of the local gods and customs of conquered lands. The first attestations of an Etruscan religion can be traced back to the Villanovan culture.

The mythology is evidenced by a number of sources in different media, for example representations on large numbers of pottery, inscriptions and engraved scenes on the Praenestine cistae (ornate boxes; see under Etruscan language) and on specula (ornate hand mirrors). Currently some two dozen fascicles of the Corpus Speculorum Etruscorum have been published. Specifically Etruscan mythological and cult figures appear in the Lexicon Iconographicum Mythologiae Classicae. Etruscan inscriptions have recently been given a more authoritative presentation by Helmut Rix, Etruskische Texte.

== Gods and Goddesses ==
=== Major deities ===
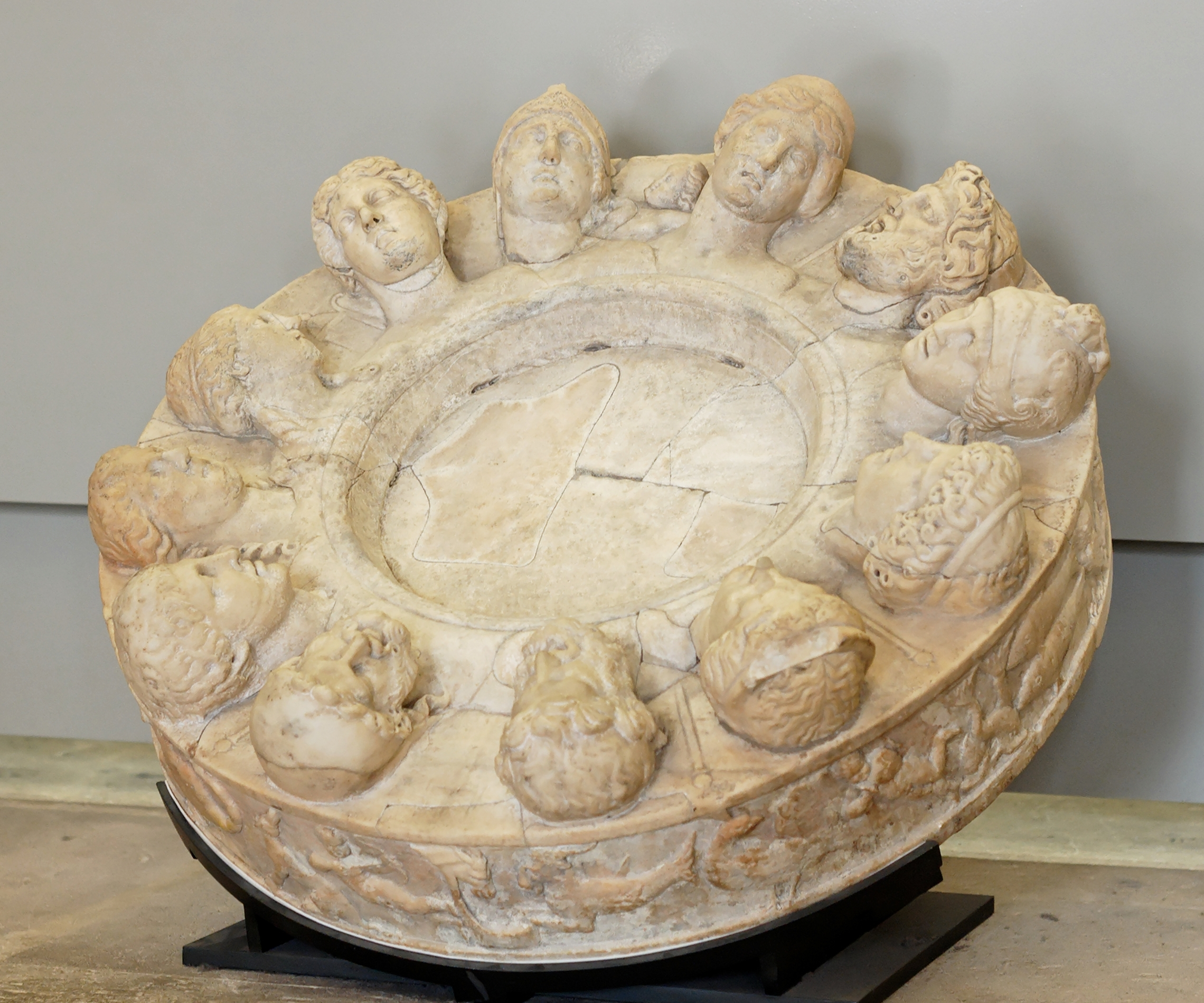
Although the ritual purpose of this 1st century BCE altar from Gabii is unclear, the twelve deities depicted correspond to the Dii Consentes

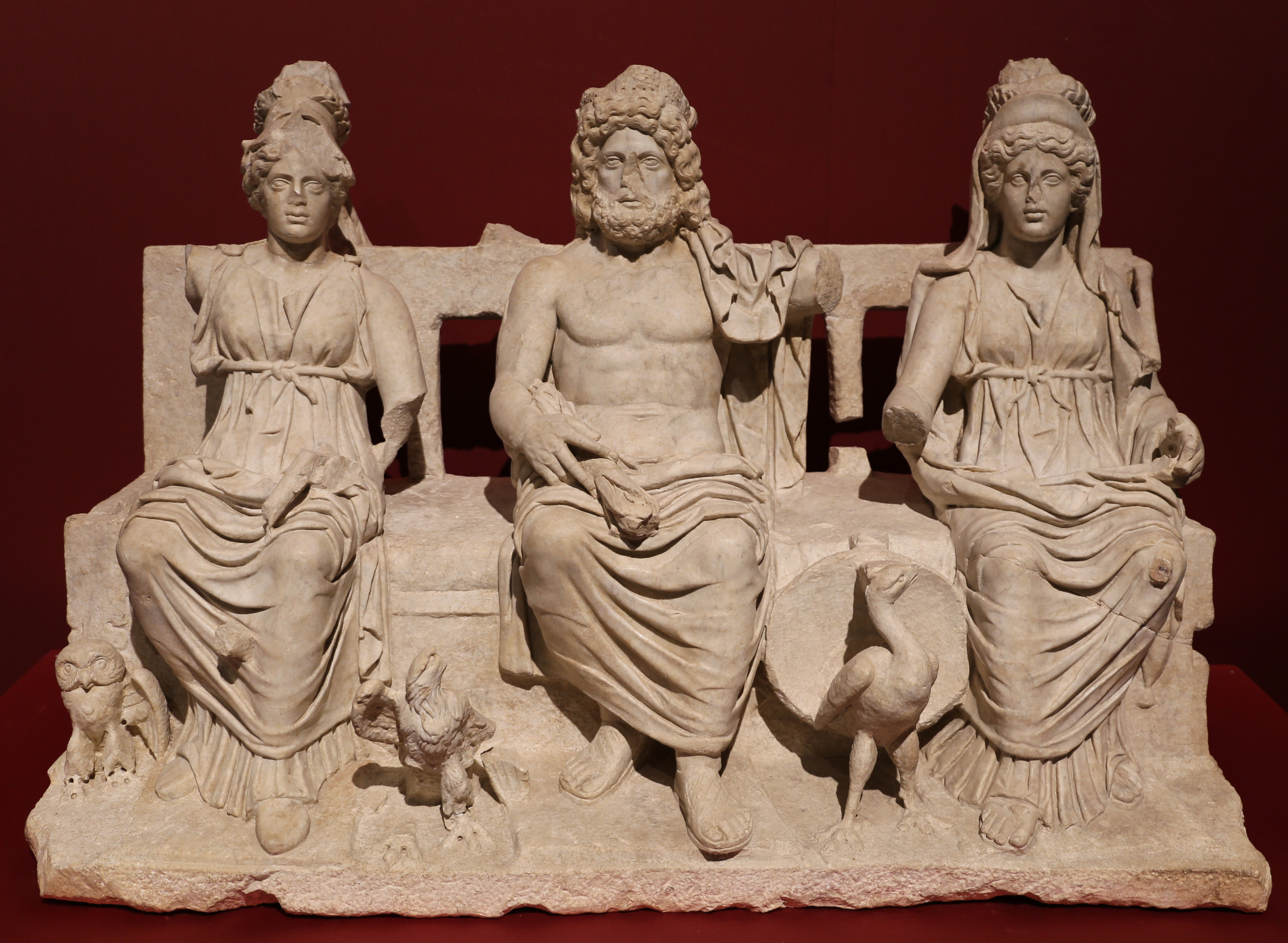
A Capitoline Triad.

The Dii Consentes, also known as Dei Consentes, Dii Complices or The Harmonious Gods, is an ancient list of twelve major deities, six gods and six goddesses, in the pantheon of Ancient Rome. Their gilt statues stood in the Roman Forum, and later apparently in the Porticus Deorum Consentium.

The gods were listed by the poet Ennius:

- Juno
- Vesta
- Minerva
- Ceres
- Diana
- Venus
- Mars
- Mercurius
- Jupiter
- Neptunus
- Vulcanus
- Apollo

Livy arranges them in six male-female pairs: Jupiter-Juno, Neptune-Minerva, Mars-Venus, Apollo-Diana, Vulcan-Vesta and Mercury-Ceres. Three of the Dii Consentes formed the Capitoline Triad: Jupiter, Juno and Minerva.

=== Other deities ===
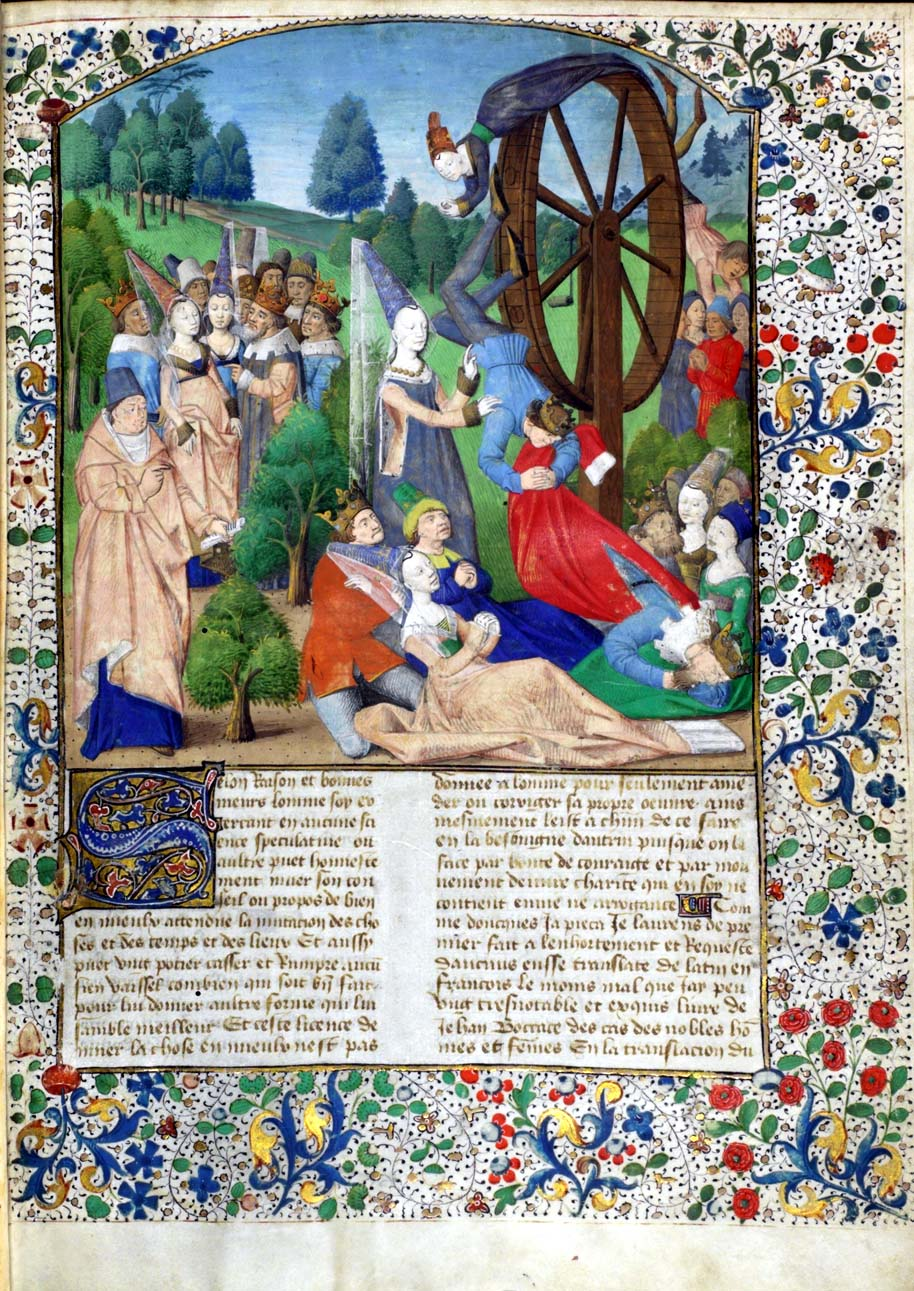
Goddesses Fortuna in a Boccaccio manuscript (14th century)

Other Gods and Goddesses of Italian Mythology include:

- Aradia is a folk Goddess of witchcraft.
- Carmenta is the Goddess of spells, known for chanting incantations in verse to ease the pains of women in labor and children facing illness.
- Februus is the Italian God of purification who lives in the underworld.
- Fortuna is the Goddess of fate and fortune and also bringer of fertility.
- Janus is the God of gateways, beginnings, and transitions, said to have 2 faces. One faces the past, and the other faces the future.
- Saturnus
- Orcus
- Luna is the Goddess of the Moon.
- Nox is the Goddess of the night, the beginning of all things, and one of the oldest of the Gods.
- Umbria is Goddess of shadows, secrets, darkness who lives in the underworld.
- Cel is the Etruscan Goddess of earth. She was the mother of Giants, a race of great strength and aggression.

== Cultural phenomena ==
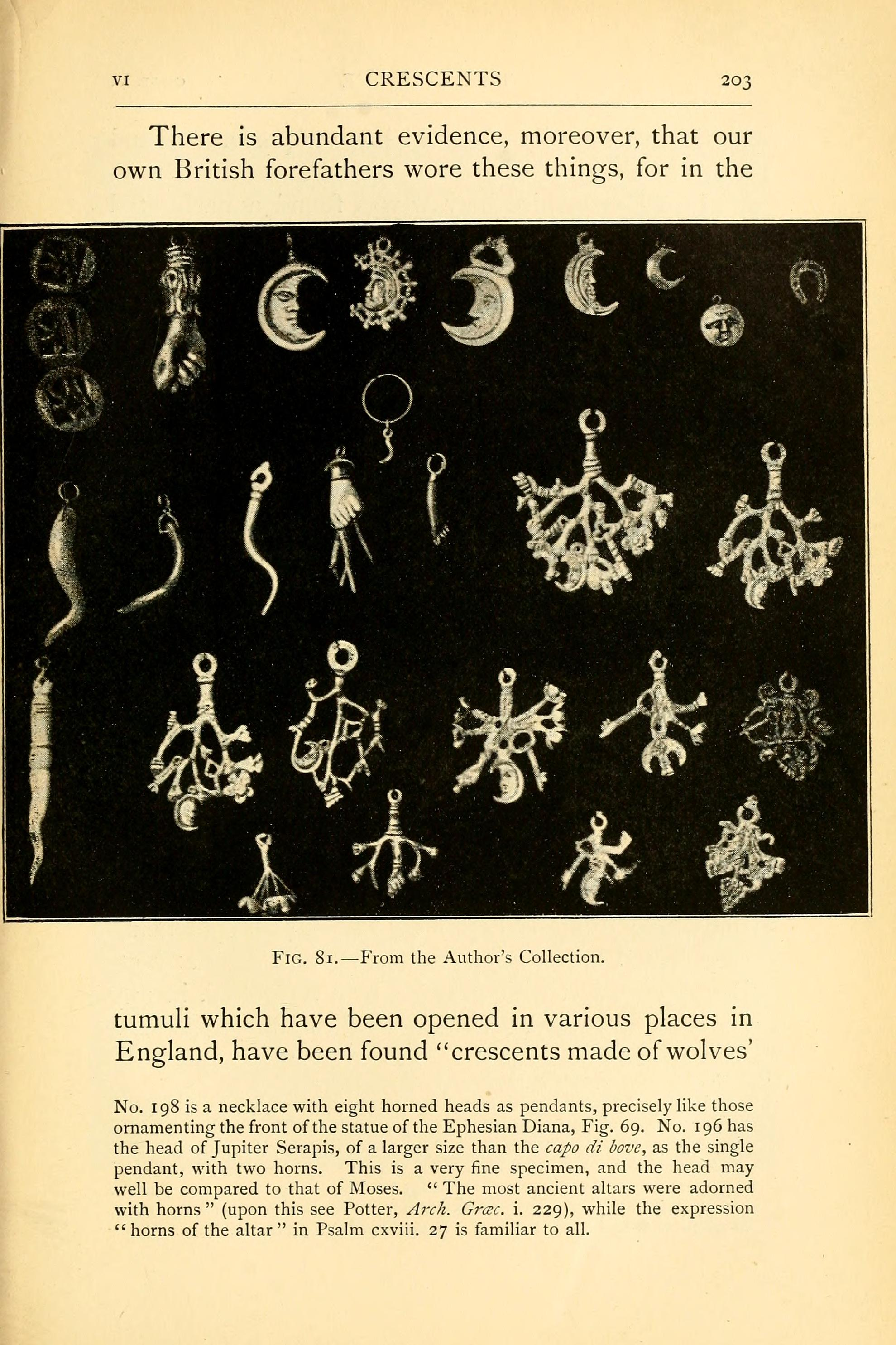
Various evil eye amulets from Italy such as the cornicello, cimaruta, and lunula (1895)

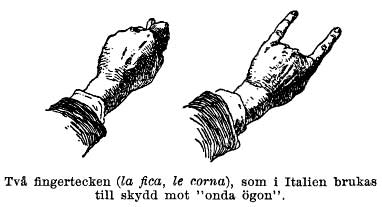
Two handsigns (fig sign and horned sign) used in Italy against the evil eye (1914)

The evil eye, in Italian malocchio, is not just a part of Italian folklore but is also present in many different cultures. The evil eye is a supernatural belief in a curse brought about by a malevolent glare, usually inspired by envy. The belief in the evil eye among humans has existed since prehistory, and amulets to protect against it have been found from dating to about 5,000 years ago. It is estimated that around 40% of the world's population believes in the evil eye.

It is found in many cultures in the Mediterranean region, the Balkans, the Middle East and Central Asia, with such cultures often believing that receiving the evil eye will cause misfortune or injury, while others believe it to be a kind of supernatural force that casts or reflects a malevolent gaze back upon those who wish harm upon others (especially innocents). The idea appears multiple times also in Jewish rabbinic literature.

Different cultures have pursued measures to protect against the evil eye. Some of the most famous talismans against the evil eye include the nazar amulet, itself a representation of an eye, and the hamsa, a hand-shaped amulet. Older iterations of the symbol were often made of ceramic or clay; however, following the production of glass beads in the Mediterranean region in approximately 1500 BC, evil eye beads were popularised with the Phoenicians, Persians, Greeks, Romans and Ottomans. Ancient Romans used representations of phallus, such as the fascinus, to protect against the evil eye, while in modern-day Southern Italy a variety of amulets and gestures are used for protection, including the cornicello, the cimaruta, and the sign of the horns.

The cornicello, "little horn", also called in Italian the cornetto ("little horn", plural cornetti), is a long, gently twisted horn-shaped amulet. Cornicelli are usually carved out of red coral or made from gold or silver. The type of horn they are intended to copy is not a curled-over sheep horn or goat horn but rather like the twisted horn of an African eland or a chili pepper. A tooth or tuft of fur of the Italian wolf was worn as a talisman against the evil eye.

One idea that the ribald suggestions made by sexual symbols distract the witch from the mental effort needed to successfully bestow the curse. Another is that since the effect of the eye was to dry up liquids, the drying of the phallus (resulting in male impotence) would be averted by seeking refuge in the moist female genitals. Among the ancient Romans and their cultural descendants in the Mediterranean nations, those who were not fortified with phallic charms had to make use of sexual gestures to avoid the eye. Such gestures include scratching one's testicles (for men), as well as the mano cornuta gesture and the fig sign; a fist with the thumb pressed between the index and middle fingers, representing the phallus within the vagina. In addition to the phallic talismans, statues of hands in these gestures, or covered with magical symbols, were carried by the Romans as talismans.

The wielder of the evil eye, the jettatore, is described as having a striking facial appearance, high arching brows with a stark stare that leaps from his eyes. He often has a reputation for clandestine involvement with dark powers and is the object of gossip about dealings in magic and other forbidden practices. Successful men having tremendous personal magnetism quickly gain notoriety as jettatori. Pope Pius IX was dreaded for his evil eye, and a whole cycle of stories about the disasters that happened in his wake were current in Rome during the latter decades of the 19th century. Public figures of every type, from poets to gangsters, have had their specialized abilities attributed to the power of their eyes.

== See also ==
- Classical mythology
- Etruscan mythology
