= Blood (surname) =

Blood is a surname deriving from the Welsh surname Lloyd ('ap Lloyd' - 'of Lloyd'). Notable people with the surname include:

- Aretas Blood (1816–1897), American railroad innovator
- Archer Blood (1923–2004), American diplomat
- Benjamin Paul Blood (1832–1919), American philosopher and poet
- Ben Blood (born 1989), American professional ice hockey player
- Bindon Blood (1842–1940), British military commander
- Carol Blood (born 1961), American politician from Nebraska
- Cherish Violet Blood (born 1981), Kainai actress and storyteller from Canada
- C. L. Blood (fl. 1867–1890), American physician
- Emma Blood (1853–1932), American philanthropist
- Ernest Blood (1872–1955), American basketball coach
- Gertrude Elizabeth Blood (1857–1911), Irish-born author, playwright, columnist, editor and socialite
- Henry H. Blood (1872–1942), American businessman and two-term governor of Utah
- Holcroft Blood (c. 1657–1707), Anglo-Irish soldier
- James Blood (1833–1885), American Union Army officer
- Maurice Blood (1870–1940), British sport shooter
- Nick Blood (born 1982), English actor, director and producer
- Richard Henry Blood (born 1953), American professional wrestler better known as Ricky "The Dragon" Steamboat
- Richard Henry Blood Jr. (born 1987), American professional wrestler better known as Ricky Steamboat Jr.
- Robert O. Blood (1887–1975), American physician and politician from New Hampshire
- Rogers Blood (1922–1944), United States Marine Corps officer and posthumous Silver Star recipient
- Thomas Blood (1618–1680), Irish colonel who tried to steal the Crown Jewels of England
- Virginia Blood (1908–1987), American politician from Connecticut
