= Božalość =

Wendish mythological figure

Božalość, also transliterated as Božaloshtsh or Bozaloshtsh is a messenger of misfortune or death in Wendish mythology (Wends, Lusatian Sorbs).

The name was translated in German ethnographic sources as "Gottesklage" i.e., "God's Lament").

An 1886 article Das Spreewaldhaus by W. v. Schulenburg associates it with the elder bush and describes it as a woman dressed in white with long, unkempt hair and red eyes:

Sambucus nigra; weil einst die Božalość kam, die Gottesklage (die im Fliederstrauch sitzt), ein Weibchen, weiss gekleidet, mit langem verwilderten Haar und rothen Augen, als man H. brannte. Nach Hartknoch glaubten die Litthauer, unter Hollunderbäumen hätten Götter ihren Sitz,...

Biren Bonnerjea describes it as a little woman with long hair, who cries under the window of someone who is about to die.

A parallel creature is bože sedleško, described as a child in white clothes. The name is of unclear etymology (the apparent association with the words "seat", "to sit", is unclear). From some folk tales it appears that sedleško, according to pagan beliefs of Lusatian Sorbs, was in every house, a kind of house spirit. The descriptions vary. For example, sedleško may be seen or heard crying like a child, or appears as a white hen. An appearance of a bože sedleško manifests a coming misfortune: death, fire, epidemics, flood, etc. (See, e.g., Bože sedleško by Handrij Zejler in Upper Sorbian.) Jacob Grimm remarks that a similar term, sedlisko means 'nightmare (demonic creature)" in Czech language. Similarly, in Polish folk beliefs, siedlisko (also, siodło, siodełko) is a (demonic) nightmare, also referred to as gnieciuch, i.e., "something that presses". They are described as something that sits on a sleeping prone person (hence the etymology of "siedlisko").

== Etymology ==
While there is an agreement that 'Božalość' means "God's Lament', the opinions about the etymology differ. In some opinions it is the contraction of "Boža žaloć", i.e., "God's Pity". Another opinion is that the word "Glosc" in the meaning of "lament" can be found in manuscripts of as early as the 17th century, and the attribute 'Boža' i.e., "God's" was added in folklore later, similarly to the poetic usages "God's wind", "God's Sun", etc.

== See also ==
- Banshee
