= Baykok =

Ojibwe legendary creature

The baykok (or pau'guk, paguk, baguck; bakaak in the Ojibwe language and pakàk in the Algonquin language) is a malevolent spirit from the mythology of the Ojibway nation.

== In traditional culture ==
The Baykok is a character from the Anishinaabe aadizookaan (traditional stories). It is said to fly through the forests of the Great Lakes region. The cries of Baykok are also described as being shrill. Described as "Death" in The Song of Hiawatha, it is said to appear as an extremely emaciated skeleton-like figure, with thin translucent skin and glowing red points for eyes. The Baykok only preys upon warriors, but does so ruthlessly, using invisible arrows or beating its prey to death with a club. The Baykok, after paralyzing or killing its prey, then devours the liver of its victim. Baykok was also said to approach a sleeping hunter, gently cut an opening in the chest and remove a piece of the stomach, without waking the victim.

The word bakaak in the Anishinaabe language means "skeleton" in the sense of "bones draped in skin" rather than "bare-bones", such that it lends itself to words like bakaakadozo, meaning "to be thin/skinny/poor", and bakaakadwengwe, meaning "to have a lean/thin face". The name Bakaak occasionally appears as Bekaak (reflected in English as "Baykok"), which may be a shortening of bekaakadwaabewizid, meaning "an extremely thin being".

The description of Bakaak's shrill cries (bagakwewewin, literally meaning "clear/distinct cries") is a pun of its name. The method the Bakaak uses to subdue its victim is another pun of its name: the word for "to beat using a club" is baagaakwaa'ige. A similar construct is found in the name for the basketry splints called baagaako'igan, prepared by pounding black ash. Yet another pun on the name is the way the Bakaak "flings its victim's chest open" (baakaakwaakiganezh) to devour the victim's liver.

== In popular culture ==
First introduced to the non-Anishinaabe public through The Song of Hiawatha, the baykok is occasionally referenced in modern fiction. Elliot James' novel Daring features a bakaak which hunts werewolves.

The Bakaak is depicted as a race of primordial homonins that preyed upon early humans in Gemma Files's short story Grave Goods.

The Baykok also appears in the Japanese franchise of role-playing games Megami Tensei, in the first two installments of the Shin Megami Tensei series as a demon enemy.

Baykok is depicted in the Minecraft mod Totemic, where it is a skeleton boss with high health and a powerful bow that fires invisible arrows, and must be summoned using a ritual.

The Baykok is a variety of undead creature in the Pathfinder RPG.

Michael Chabon's novel Summerland includes mention of Baykoks amongst other supernatural beings.

== See also ==
- The Song of Hiawatha
