= Broxa =

Mythological creature of Jewish folklore

In Jewish folklore, Broxa is a bird that is said to suck the milk of goats and sometimes human blood during the night.

In medieval Portugal, the Broxa was considered to be a shape shifting entity-as a witch in female form and in male form, a demon. It has been speculated that this creature was derived from the Jewish mythical creature.

== See also ==
- Chupacabra
