= Bar Juchne =

Legendary bird

- Grouping: Local legend
- Sub grouping: Bird
- First attested: The Talmud
- Country: Middle East
- Region: Uncertain

Bar Juchne or Bar-Yuchnei is a colossal legendary bird from Jewish mythology which was believed to have a wingspan large enough to block out the sun.

The Talmud tells of a Bar Juchne egg falling from its nest and destroying 300 cedars and flooding 60 villages/cities. After questioning how the egg could have fallen, if the Bar Juchne normally lays its eggs on the ground, the Talmud answers that the bird threw this particular egg to the ground because it was unfertilized.

The Talmud raises the possibility that food impurity should only apply to a volume of food equal to the Bar Juchne's gigantic egg, before deciding that the relevant volume is rather that of a chicken egg.

== See also ==
- Anqa
- Behemoth
- Leviathan
- Roc
- Thunderbird
- Ziz
