= Blood (automobile) =

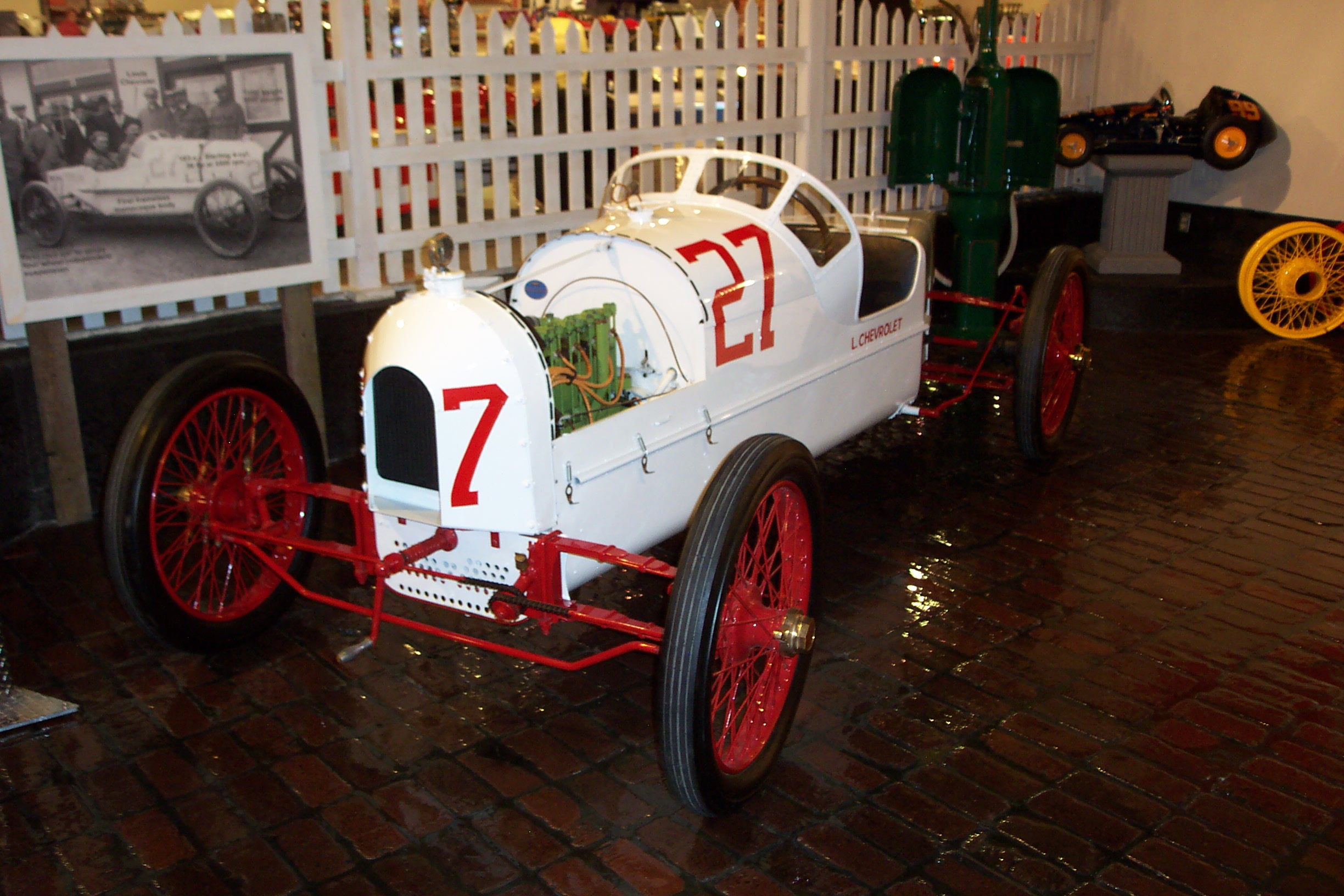
A replica of "The Cornelian," a racecar built by the Blood brothers and driven by Louis Chevrolet

The Blood was an automobile manufactured in Kalamazoo, Michigan, by the Blood Brothers Auto & Machine Company from 1902 to 1905. They produced a five-seater tonneau with a two-cylinder opposed engine, costing $1,800. The drive system had a four-speed transmission and transferred power to the rear axle by a shaft.

Maurice & Clarence Blood were owners of a bicycle shop at 210 N. Rose St, in Kalamazoo. They sold a Mobile Steam car to Oscar Buckout in 1901, making them the first automotive dealership in Kalamazoo. They eventually built and sold 150 Blood cars. In 1905, they ceased building automobiles, and concentrated on universal joints in a small factory. Maurice's son, Howard, later built the Cornelian Cyclecar.
