= Blud =

Fairy in Slavic mythology

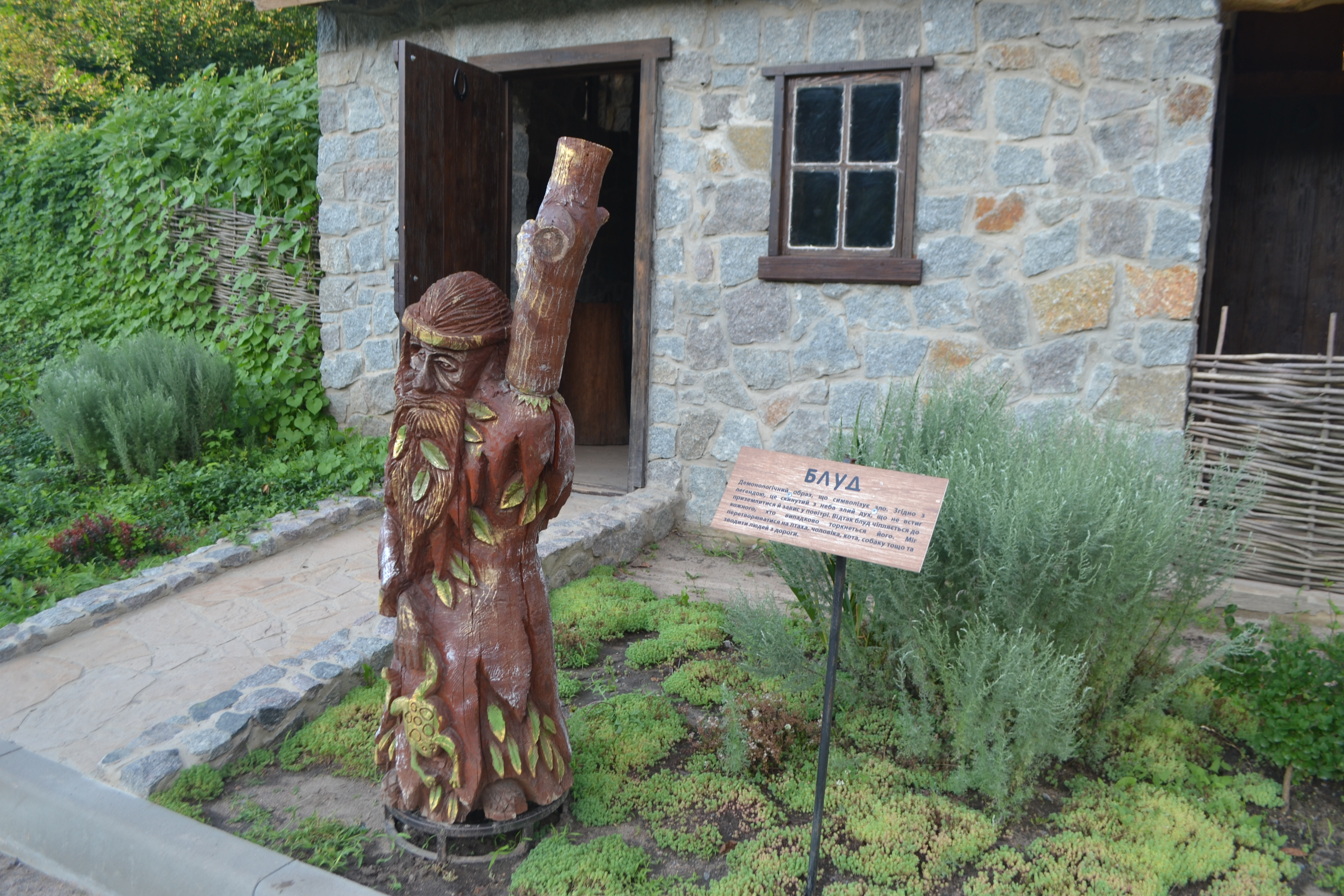
A sculpture of Blud in Ukraine, 2021

Blud (/bluːd/ BL-OOH-D; Ukrainian: Блуд, Russian: Блуд), one of the Slavic fairies in Slavic mythology, is an evil-deity that causes disorientation and leads a person aimlessly around and round. The term also refers to illicit fornication, the desire for which Slavic clerics claimed to come from the Devil.

Blud in the Russian language means: debauchery, adultery and deviation from the straight path in the literal and figurative sense.
