= Biast Bhealach Odail =

Creature in Scottish folklore

In Scottish folklore the Biast Bhealach Odail (older spelling: Biasd Bhealach Odail) is a monster or spirit that haunts Odal Pass on the Isle of Skye in Scotland.

== Description ==
The Biast Bhealach Odail is a nocturnal shapeshifter described by John Gregorson Campbell in Witchcraft and Second Sight in the Highlands and Islands of Scotland (1902):

Sometimes it bore the form of a man, sometimes of a man with only one leg. At other times it appeared like a greyhound or beast prowling about, and sometimes it was heard uttering frightful shrieks and outcries which made the workmen leave their bothies in horror. It was only during the night it was seen or heard.

Travellers through the pass at night often reported being attacked by it. One of its victims, according to legend, was found dead on the roadside pierced with two wounds, one on his side and one on his leg with a hand pressed on each wound. Campbell states that "it was considered impossible that these wounds could have been inflicted by human agency." He further mentions that the attacks ceased after the victim's body was found, which led the folklorist Katharine Briggs to suggest that the monster may have been the ghost of a murdered man looking for revenge.
