= Kelpie =

Shape-shifting water spirit in Scottish folklore

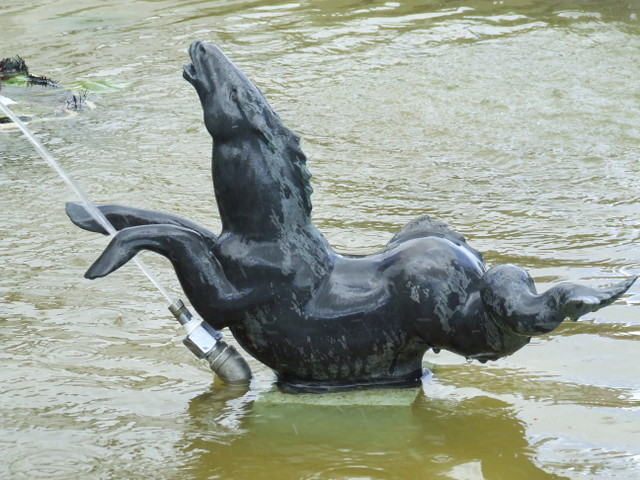
One of six kelpies in the globe fountain at Shuttle Row near to Blantyre, South Lanarkshire, Scotland

In Scottish folklore, a kelpie, or water kelpie (Scottish Gaelic: each-uisge), is a mythical shape-shifting spirit inhabiting lochs in Scotland. They also reside in meres and streams in Yorkshire (Jórvik) mythology. Legends of these shape-shifting water-horses, under various names, spread across the British Isles, appearing in the Northern Isles, Irish, Manx, Northern English, and Welsh folklore. It is usually described as a grey or white horse-like creature, able to adopt human form. Some accounts state that the kelpie retains its hooves when appearing as a human, leading to its association with the Christian idea of Satan as alluded to by Robert Burns in his 1786 poem "Address to the Devil".

Almost every sizeable body of water in Scotland has an associated kelpie story, but the most extensively reported is that of Loch Ness. The kelpie has counterparts across the world, such as the Germanic nixie, the wihwin of Central America and the Australian bunyip. The origins of narratives about the creature are unclear, but the practical purposes of keeping children away from dangerous stretches of water and warning young women to be wary of handsome strangers has been noted in secondary literature.

Kelpies have been portrayed in their various forms in art and literature, including two 30-metre-high (100 ft) steel sculptures in Falkirk, The Kelpies, completed in October 2013.

== Etymology ==
The etymology of the Scots word kelpie is uncertain, but it may be derived from the Gaelic calpa or cailpeach, meaning "heifer" or "colt". The first recorded use of the term to describe a mythological creature, then spelled kaelpie, appears in the manuscript of an ode by William Collins, composed some time before 1759 and reproduced in the Transactions of the Royal Society of Edinburgh of 1788. The place names Kelpie hoall and Kelpie hooll are reported in A Dictionary of the Older Scottish Tongue as appearing in the 1674 burgh records for Kirkcudbright.

== Folk beliefs ==
=== Description and common attributes ===
The kelpie is the most common water spirit in Scottish folklore, and its name is attributed to several different forms in narratives recorded throughout the country. The late 19th century saw the onset of an interest in transcribing folklore, and recorders were inconsistent in spelling and frequently anglicised words, which could result in differing names for the same spirit.

Commentators have disagreed over the kelpie's aquatic habitat. Folklorists who define kelpies as spirits living beside rivers, as distinguished from the Celtic lochside-dwelling water horse (each-uisge), include 19th-century minister of Tiree John Gregorson Campbell and 20th-century writers Lewis Spence and Katharine Briggs. This distinction is not universally applied however; Sir Walter Scott for instance claims that the kelpie's range may extend to lochs. Mackillop's dictionary reconciles the discrepancy, stating that the kelpie was "initially thought to inhabit ... streams, and later any body of water." One annotator argues that the distinction should stand, suggesting that people are led astray when an each uisge in a "common practice of translating" are referred to as kelpies in English accounts, and thus mistakenly attribute loch-dwelling habits to the latter.

Others associate the term kelpie with a wide variety of legendary creatures. Counterparts in some regions of Scotland include the shoopiltee and nuggle of Shetland and the tangie of Orkney; in other parts of the British Islands they include the Welsh ceffyl dŵr and the Manx cabbyl-ushtey. Parallels to the general Germanic neck and the Scandinavian bäckahäst have been observed; Nick Middleton observes that "the kelpie of Scottish folklore is a direct parallel of the [sic] bäckahästen [of Scandinavian folklore]". Additionally, the wihwin of Central America and the Australian bunyip are seen as similar creatures in other parts of the world.

The kelpie is usually described as a powerful and beautiful black horse inhabiting the deep pools of rivers and streams of Scotland, preying on any humans it encounters. One of the water-kelpie's common identifying characteristics is that its hooves are reversed as compared to those of a normal horse, a trait also shared by the nykur of Iceland. An Aberdeenshire variation portrays the kelpie as a horse with a mane of serpents, whereas the resident equine spirit of the River Spey was white and could entice victims onto its back by singing.

The creature's nature was described by Walter Gregor, a folklorist and one of the first members of the Folklore Society, as "useful", "hurtful", or seeking "human companionship"; in some cases, kelpies take their victims into the water, devour them, and throw the entrails to the water's edge. In its equine form the kelpie is able to extend the length of its back to carry many riders together into the depths; a common theme in the tales is of several children clambering onto the creature's back while one remains on the shore. Other narratives include a little boy who pets the horse but his hand sticks to its neck. In some variations the lad cuts off his fingers or hand to free himself; he survives but the other children are carried off and drowned, with only some of their entrails being found later. Such a creature said to inhabit Glen Keltney in Perthshire is considered to be a kelpie by 20th-century folklorist Katharine Mary Briggs, but a similar tale also set in Perthshire has an each uisge as the culprit and omits the embellishment of the young boy. The lad does cut his finger off when the event takes place in Thurso, where a water kelpie is identified as the culprit. The same tale set at Sunart in the Highlands gives a specific figure of nine children lost, of whom only the innards of one are recovered. The surviving boy is again saved by cutting off his finger, and the additional information is given that he had a Bible in his pocket. Gregorson Campbell considers the creature responsible to have been a water horse rather than a kelpie, and the tale "obviously a pious fraud to keep children from wandering on Sundays".

Kelpie myths usually describe a solitary creature, but a fairy story recorded by John F. Campbell in Popular Tales of the West Highlands (1860) has a different perspective. Entitled Of the Drocht na Vougha or Fuoah, which is given the translation of the bridge of the fairies or kelpies, it features a group of voughas. The spirits had set about constructing a bridge over the Dornoch Firth after becoming tired of travelling across the water in cockleshells. It was a magnificent piece of work resplendent with gold piers and posts, but sank into the water to become a treacherous area of quicksand after a grateful onlooker tried to bless the kelpies for their work. The same story is recorded by Folklore Society member and folklore collector Charlotte Dempster simply as The Kelpie's Bridge (1888) with no mention of Voughas or Fuoah. Quoting the same narrative Jennifer Westwood, author and folklorist, uses the descriptor water kelpies, adding that in her opinion "Kelpies, here and in a few other instances, is used in a loose sense to mean something like 'imps'".

Progeny resulting from a mating between a kelpie and a normal horse were impossible to drown, and could be recognised by their shorter than normal ears, a characteristic shared by the mythical water bull or tarbh uisge in Scottish Gaelic, similar to the Manx tarroo ushtey.

=== Shapeshifting ===
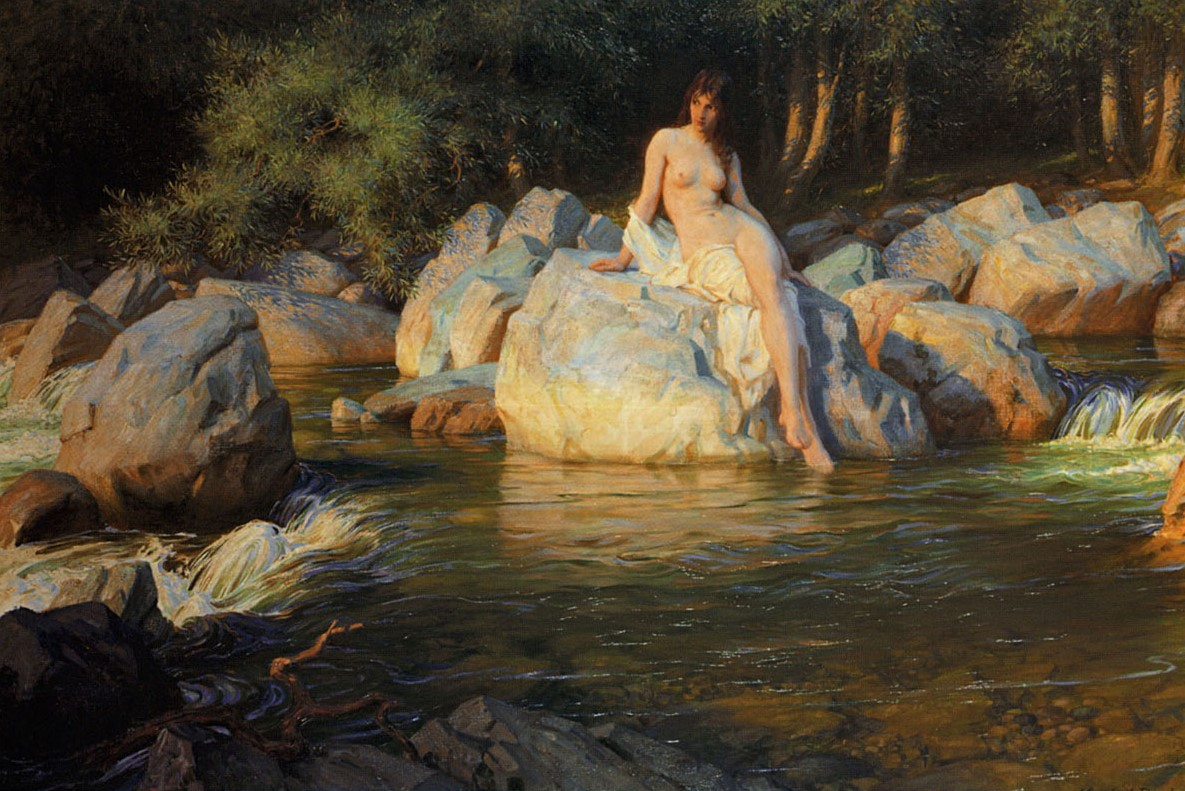
The Kelpie by Herbert James Draper, 1913

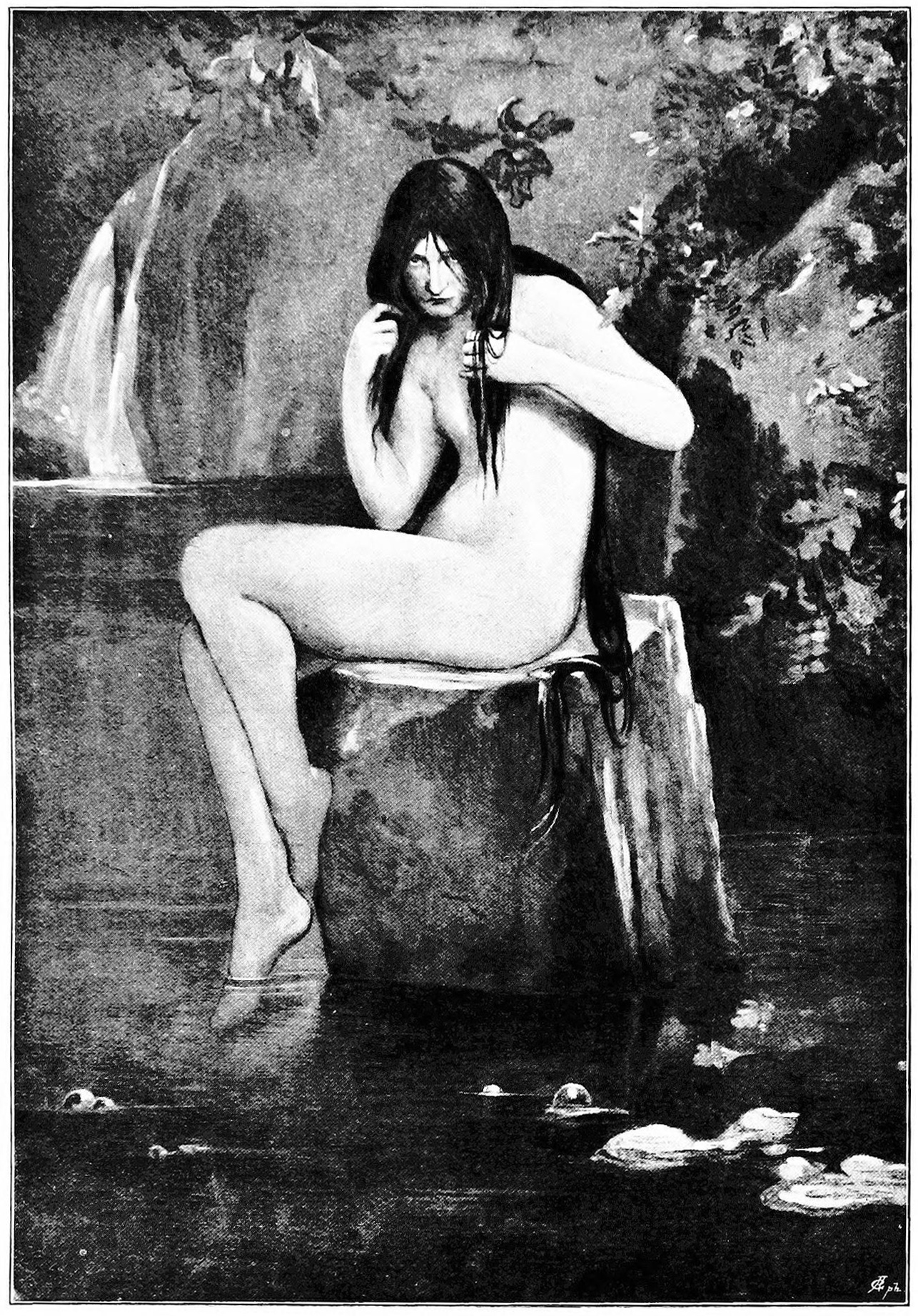
The Kelpie by Thomas Millie Dow, 1895

Kelpies have the ability to transform themselves into non-equine forms, and can take on the outward appearance of human figures, in which guise they may betray themselves by the presence of water weeds in their hair. Gregor described a kelpie adopting the guise of a wizened old man continually muttering to himself while sitting on a bridge stitching a pair of trousers. Believing it to be a kelpie, a passing local struck it on the head, causing it to revert to its equine form and scamper back to its lair in a nearby pond. Other accounts describe the kelpie when appearing in human form as a "rough, shaggy man who leaps behind a solitary rider, gripping and crushing him", or as tearing apart and devouring humans.

A folk tale from Barra tells of a lonely kelpie that transforms itself into a handsome young man to woo a pretty young girl it was determined to take for its wife. But the girl recognises the young man as a kelpie and removes his silver necklace (his bridle) while he sleeps. The kelpie immediately reverts to its equine form, and the girl takes it home to her father's farm, where it is put to work for a year. At the end of that time the girl rides the kelpie to consult a wise man, who tells her to return the silver necklace. The wise man then asks the kelpie, once again transformed into the handsome young man the girl had first met, whether if given the choice it would choose to be a kelpie or a mortal. The kelpie in turn asks the girl whether, if he were a man, she would agree to be his wife. She confirms that she would, after which the kelpie chooses to become a mortal man, and the pair are married.

Traditionally, kelpies in their human form are male. One of the few stories describing the creature in female form is set at Conon House in Ross and Cromarty. It tells of a "tall woman dressed in green", with a "withered, meagre countenance, ever distorted by a malignant scowl", who overpowered and drowned a man and a boy after she jumped out of a stream.

The arrival of Christianity in Scotland in the 6th century resulted in some folk stories and beliefs being recorded by scribes, usually Christian monks, instead of being perpetuated by word of mouth. Some accounts state that the kelpie retains its hooves even in human form, leading to its association with the Christian notion of Satan, just as with the Greek god Pan. Robert Burns refers to such a Satanic association in his "Address to the Devil" (1786):

When thowes dissolve the snawy hoord
An' float the jinglin icy boord
Then, water-kelpies haunt the foord
By your direction
An' nighted trav'llers are allur'd
To their destruction.

=== Capture and killing ===
When a kelpie appeared in its equine persona without any tack, it could be captured using a halter stamped with the sign of a cross, and its strength could then be harnessed in tasks such as the transportation of heavy mill stones. One folk tale describes how the Laird of Morphie captured a kelpie and used it to carry stones to build his castle. Once the work was complete, the laird released the kelpie, which was evidently unhappy about its treatment. The curse it issued before leaving – "Sair back and sair banes/ Drivin' the Laird o' Morphies's stanes,/ The Laird o' Morphie'll never thrive/ As lang's the kelpy is alive" – (Sore back and sore bones/ Driving the Lord of Morphie's stones,/ The Lord of Morphie will never thrive/ As long as the kelpie is alive) was popularly believed to have resulted in the extinction of the laird's family. Some kelpies were said to be equipped with a bridle and sometimes a saddle, and appeared invitingly ready to ride, but if mounted they would run off and drown their riders. If the kelpie was already wearing a bridle, exorcism might be achieved by removing it. A bridle taken from a kelpie was endowed with magical properties, and if brandished towards someone, was able to transform that person into a horse or pony.

Just as with cinematic werewolves, a kelpie can be killed by being shot with a silver bullet, after which it is seen to consist of nothing more than "turf and a soft mass like jelly-fish" according to an account published by Spence. When a blacksmith's family were being frightened by the repeated appearances of a water kelpie at their summer cottage, the blacksmith managed to render it into a "heap of starch, or something like it" by penetrating the spirit's flanks with two sharp iron spears that had been heated in a fire.

== Loch Ness ==
Almost every sizeable Scottish body of water has a kelpie story associated with it, but the most widely reported is the kelpie of Loch Ness. Several stories of mythical spirits and monsters are attached to the loch's vicinity, dating back to 6th-century reports of Saint Columba defeating a monster on the banks of the River Ness. The early 19th-century kelpie that haunted the woods and shores of Loch Ness was tacked up with its own saddle and bridle. A fable attached to the notoriously nasty creature has the Highlander James MacGrigor taking it by surprise and cutting off its bridle, the source of its power and life, without which it would die within twenty-four hours. As the kelpie had the power of speech, it attempted unsuccessfully to bargain with MacGrigor for the return of its bridle. After following MacGrigor to his home, the kelpie asserted that MacGrigor would be unable to enter his house while in possession of the bridle, because of the presence of a cross above the entrance door. But MacGrigor outwitted the creature by tossing the bridle through a window, so the kelpie accepted its fate and left, cursing and swearing. The myth is perpetuated with further tales of the bridle as it is passed down through the family. Referred to as "Willox's Ball and Bridle", it had magical powers of healing; a spell was made by placing the items in water while chanting "In the name of the Father, the Son and of the Holy Ghost"; the water could then be used as a cure.

A popular and more recent explanation for the Loch Ness monster among believers is that it belongs to a line of long-surviving plesiosaurs, but the kelpie myth still survives in children's books such as Mollie Hunter's The Kelpie's Pearls (1966) and Dick King-Smith's The Water Horse (1990).

== Origins ==
According to Derek Gath Whitley (1911), the association with horses may have its roots in horse sacrifices performed in ancient Scandinavia. Stories of malevolent water spirits served the practical purpose of keeping children away from perilous areas of water, and of warning adolescent women to be wary of attractive young strangers. The stories were also used to enforce moral standards, as they implied that the creatures took retribution for bad behaviour carried out on Sundays. The intervention of demons and spirits was possibly a way to rationalise the drowning of children and adults who had accidentally fallen into deep, fast flowing or turbulent water.

Historian and symbologist Charles Milton Smith has hypothesised that the kelpie myth might originate with the water spouts that can form over the surface of Scottish lochs, giving the impression of a living form as they move across the water. Sir Walter Scott alludes to a similar explanation in his epic poem The Lady of the Lake (1810), which contains the lines

He watched the wheeling eddies boil,
Till from their foam his dazzled eyes
Beheld the River Demon rise:

in which Scott uses "River Demon" to denote a "kelpy". Scott may also have hinted at an alternative rational explanation by naming a treacherous area of quicksand "Kelpie's Flow" in his novel The Bride of Lammermoor (1818).

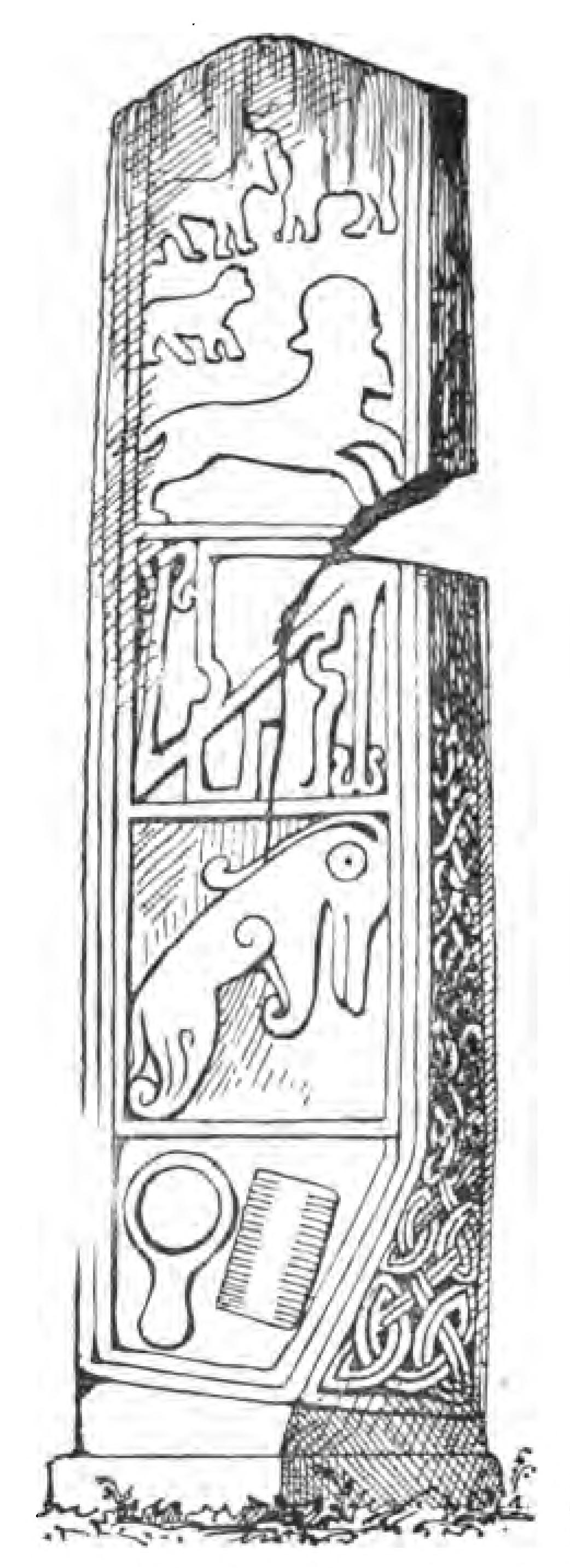
Pictish beast featured in a line drawing of the Maiden Stone

== Artistic representations ==
Pictish stones dating from the 6th to 9th centuries featuring what has been dubbed the Pictish Beast may be the earliest representations of a kelpie or kelpie-like creature.

Victorian artist Thomas Millie Dow sketched the kelpie in 1895 as a melancholy dark-haired maiden balanced on a rock, a common depiction for artists of the period. Other depictions show kelpies as poolside maidens, as in Draper's 1913 oil on canvas. Folklorist Nicola Bown has suggested that painters such as Millie Dow and Draper deliberately ignored earlier accounts of the kelpie and reinvented it by altering its sex and nature.

Two 30-metre-high (100 ft) steel sculptures in Falkirk on the Forth and Clyde Canal, named The Kelpies, borrow the name of the mythical creature to associate with the strength and endurance of the horse; designed by sculptor Andy Scott, they were built as monuments to Scotland's horse-powered industrial heritage. Construction was completed in October 2013 and the sculptures were opened for public access from April 2014.

== See also ==
- List of fictional horses
- Water horse
  - Each-uisge (Gaelic and Manx)
  - Nuckelavee (Orkney)
  - Nuggle (Shetland)
  - Tangie (Orkney)
  - Ceffyl Dŵr (Wales)
- Selkie (Gaelic)
- Peg Powler (England)
- Nixie, Neck, or Nøkk (Teutonic and Scandinavia)
- Vodyanoi (E. Europe)
- Hippocampus (Mediterranean)
- Kappa (folklore) (Japan)
- Grant (folklore) (England)
