= Boobrie =

Mythological shapeshifting entity in Scotland

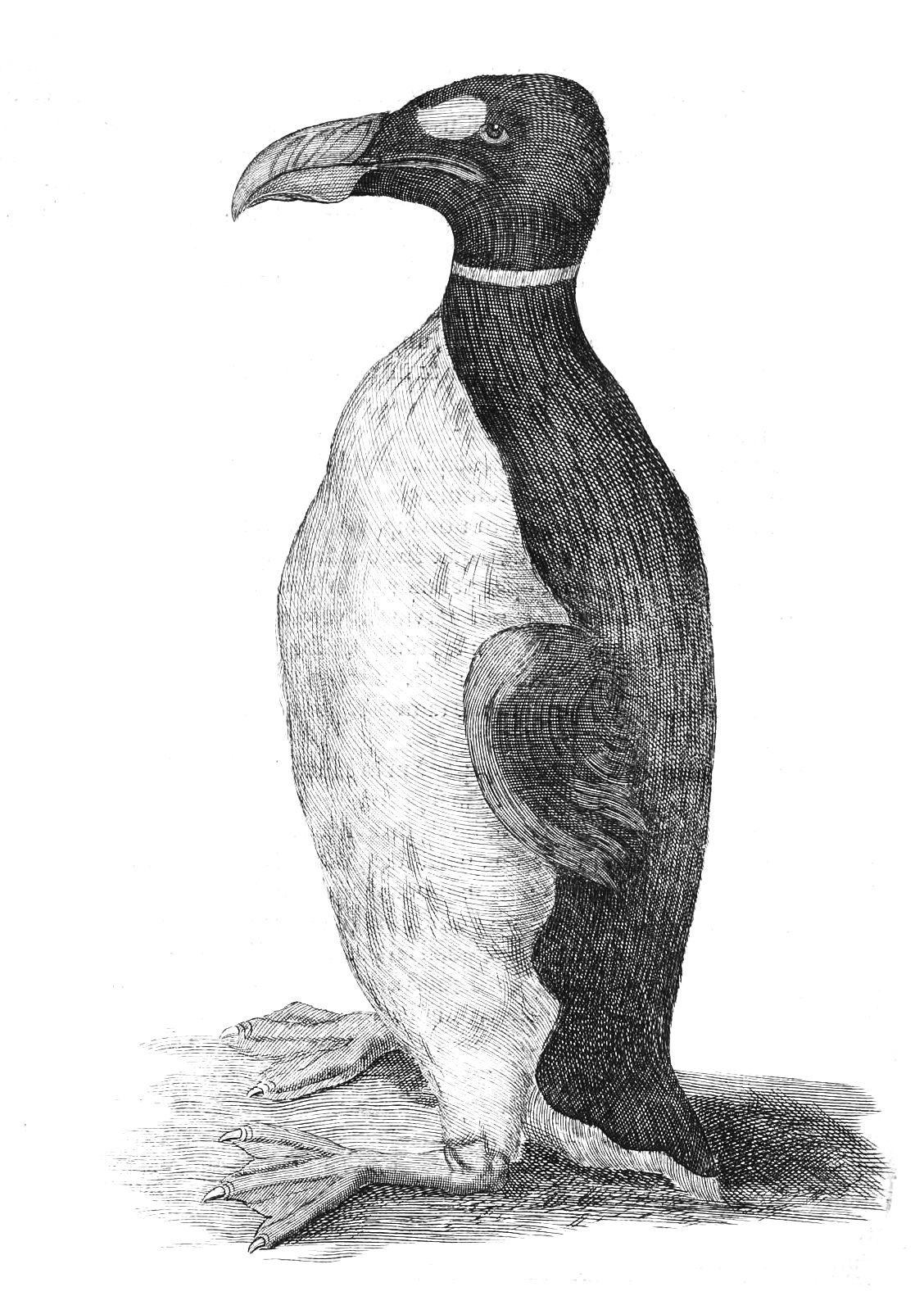
A great auk, which may be the source for descriptions of the boobrie

The boobrie is a mythological shapeshifting entity inhabiting the lochs of the west coast of Scotland. It commonly adopts the appearance of a gigantic water bird resembling a cormorant or great northern diver, but it can also materialise in the form of various other mythological creatures such as a water bull.

A generally malevolent entity, the boobrie typically preys on livestock being transported on ships, but it is also fond of otters, of which it consumes a considerable number. In its manifestation as a water horse the creature is able to gallop across the top of lochs as if on solid ground. During the summer months it is seen infrequently as a large insect, sucking the blood of horses.

Folklorist Campbell of Islay has speculated that descriptions of the boobrie may be based on sightings of the great auk. The bellowing sound made by the boobrie, more like a bull than a bird, may have its origin in the strange call of the common bittern, which was a rare visitor to Scotland.

== Etymology ==
Boobrie may derive from boibhre, meaning cow giver or cow bestowing. Edward Dwelly, a Scottish lexicographer, lists tarbh-boidhre as "Monster, demon" and "God capable of changing himself into many forms"; tarbh-aoidhre is given as a northern counties variation. The simpler component of tarbh as a single word is defined by Dwelly as "bull." Transcribers of the tale have used several differing spellings of the second component, some even adopting inconsistent variations throughout their own renditions. George Henderson for instance, a folklorist and Celtic scholar, used five alternatives: bo'eithre; boidhre; bo-oibhre; eithre; and fhaire. Spelling variations employed by other writers include aoidhre; baoighre; baoidhre; boidhre; eighre; and oire.

== Folk beliefs ==
=== Description and common attributes ===
Investigation into folklore, especially Celtic oral traditions, began in the 19th century, and several "bizarre" and less familiar beasts were identified, including the boobrie. It is a generally malevolent entity, with the ability to materialise in the form of various mythical creatures. It commonly preys on animals being transported on ships, preferably calves, but will also happily eat lambs and sheep, carrying its prey away to the deepest water before consuming it. It is also extremely fond of otters, which it consumes in large quantities.

In its favoured bird manifestation the boobrie resembles a gigantic great northern diver or cormorant, but with white markings. According to folklorist Campbell of Islay, a detailed account of its dimensions provided by an authoritative source claims that it is "larger than seventeen of the biggest eagles put together". It has a strong black beak about 11 inches (280 mm) wide and 17 inches (430 mm) in length, the final 5 inches (130 mm) of which taper like that of an eagle. The creature's neck is almost 3 feet (0.91 m) long with a girth of a little under 2 feet (0.61 m). Short black powerful legs lead to webbed feet with gigantic claws. An imprint of a boobrie's foot left in some lakeside mud equalled "the span of a large wide-spreading pair of red deer's horns". It bellows noisily with displeasure, sounding more like a bull than a bird. The design of its wings is more conducive to swimming rather than for flight. Its evil powers when in the form of a bird were said by Campbell of Islay to have "terrified a minister out of his propriety". The boobrie's insatiable appetite for livestock posed a threat to local farmers, as they relied on their animals as a means of providing income and food.

Although sea lochs are the boobries' natural home they will shelter on land in overgrown heather. Accounts are inconsistent as to the extent of the boobrie's habitat. Campbell of Islay claims that it is specific to the lochs of Argyllshire, as does Emeritus Professor of English James MacKillop. The writers Katharine Briggs and Patricia Monaghan on the other hand consider the creature's range to be the broader Scottish Highlands, although Briggs does sometimes specify Argyllshire. Campbell of Islay's undated manuscript notes the boobrie had not been seen for several years probably due to the widespread burning of heather in the area of its habitat.

=== Alternative manifestations ===
When manifested as a water horse the creature is able to gallop across the surface of lochs; the beating noise of the creature's hooves on the water is the same as if it were galloping on solid ground.

Henderson reproduced parts of Campbell of Islay's manuscripts when writing Survivals in belief among the Celts (1911). Among them is a story listed as "boobrie as tarbh uisge". The tale starts by detailing how a man named Eachann fed a colossal black bull when he discovered it writhing in pain and possibly close to death at the side of Loch nan Dobhran, on the west coast of Argyll. Some months later, Phemie, Eachann's girlfriend, is occasionally disturbed by elusive shadows she senses on the loch, which make her think of Murdoch, her former paramour. While she sat dreaming of Eachann one evening when staying at a sheiling near the loch, she sensed the flicker of a shadow behind her, except this time it was Murdoch. He promptly overpowered her by enveloping her in a blanket and tying her hands. At that point, a water bull came to Phemie's rescue by knocking Murdoch to the ground. The bull then knelt down allowing Phemie to get on its back, before transporting her at the speed of light back to the home of her mother. The bull disappeared, never to be seen again, but a "voice was heard in the air calling out loudly". The verse heard was in Gaelic, and translates as:

I was assisted by a young man
And I aided a maid in distress;
Then after three hundred years of bondage
Relieve me quickly.

It is then asserted that the tale "reveals the persistence in folk-belief of the idea of transformation, the boobrie being the abode of a spirit".

The boobrie can also manifest itself in the form of a large insect that sucks the blood of horses. Henderson refers to it as a "big striped brown gobhlachan or ear-wig" (Note: Dwelly defines gobhlachan as, among other things, daddy long legs, crane-fly and various fish, etc.) with "lots of tentacles or feelers". It was infrequently seen in this form, usually only at the height of the summer, during August and September.

=== Capture and hunting ===
A farmer and his son were ploughing a field on the Isle of Mull using a team of four horses beside Loch Freisa, but work stalled after one of the horses lost a shoe and was unable to continue. Noticing a horse grazing nearby they decided to try using it as a replacement. Once harnessed to the wooden plough the horse appeared to be familiar with the task, and initially worked steadily. As it began to work towards an area closest to the loch, it became restless and the farmer gently used a whip to encourage the animal to continue. It reacted by immediately transforming into a gigantic boobrie, giving out a loud bellow and diving into the loch, pulling the plough and the other three horses with it. The frightened farmer and his son watched as the creature swam to the centre of the loch then dived underwater, taking the other horses and plough with it. Seven hours later there was still no sign of the three horses.

In a story transcribed by John Campbell of Kilberry, a hunter attempted to shoot a boobrie after he spotted it in its bird-like manifestation on a sea loch one chilly February day. The man paddled into the loch until the water was up to his shoulders, but when he was about 85 yards (78 m) from the creature it dived under the water. The hunter maintained his position for forty-five minutes before returning to the shore, where he remained for a further six hours waiting unsuccessfully for the boobrie to resurface. No clear indication is given of the loch's whereabouts.

== Origins ==
Campbell of Islay speculates that the boobrie may have originated from sightings of the great auk. He noted he had been told stories of the creature by various people, and regarded it as having "a real existence in the popular mind". He considered the tale of the boobrie in its water horse manifestation resembled the Norse myth of "the ploughing of the Asa". Referring to Forbes' 1905 dictionary of "Gaelic names of beasts" in which bubaire is defined as a common bittern, and a detailed description given by scholar James Logie Robertson of the bull o' the bog (an alternative name for a bittern) in The Scotsman in 1908, Henderson hypothesises that the boobrie may stem from the bittern. Referring to the bittern's "strangely weird sound" and highlighting its "weird hollow cry" during the night and throughout the evening, he describes it as resembling quietly bellowing cattle, particularly during the bird's breeding season. Records indicate that the bird was rare in Scotland but had been sighted in the first decade of the 20th century, although catching sight of a bittern was believed to be a harbinger of death or disaster.
