= Wihwin =

Water spirit in Central American folklore

Wihwin is the name given to a malevolent water spirit of Central America, particularly associated with the Miskito tribe. Similar mythological creatures around the world include the kelpie in Scotland, the Scandinavian bäckahäst and the Australian bunyip. Although normally a sea-dwelling demon, it prowls through mountain ridges during the summer months.

The horse-shaped monster has "jaws fenced round with horrid teeth", which it uses to consume humans and other prey it finds on its nocturnal hunts.
