= Ceffyl Dŵr =

Water horse in Welsh folklore

Ceffyl Dŵr (also ceffyl dwfr or ceffyl-dŵr) is a water horse in Welsh folklore. It is most commonly considered a counterpart to the Scottish kelpie, but has also been compared to the Irish púca, the Irish and Scottish each uisge, and the Manx glaistyn.

The ceffyl dŵr is said to inhabit mostly mountain pools and waterfalls, though it has been known to frequent rivers and seashores as well. It was believed to be a spirit assuming the shape of a horse, usually grey or black with a white mane, sometimes glowing or winged, to entice unwary travellers to ride him. Once mounted it would either carry its rider great distances very quickly, or fly into the sky, then evaporate into air or mist, dropping the unfortunate rider to their death.

The ceffyl dŵr could be caught and put to work, but would always escape eventually and drag its captor to their death.

== Description and Attributes ==
The temperament of the ceffyl dŵr varied depending on region. In North Wales he was often seen as malevolent, described with fiery eyes and a dark, forbidding presence, whereas in South Wales he was generally more positively seen as, at worst, a pest to travellers, and at best a great aid to tired travellers and often luminescent. The water-horse of the River Honddu, specifically, had a "tormenting" reputation, as shown by a story in which it carried a weary man from an ancient Roman camp near the town of Brecon to the banks of the Towy, not far from Carmarthen. Three days later it carried him back, but "in a worse state than when he left, for the ceffyl dŵr had dragged him through mire and water, through brambles and briars, until he was scarcely knowable".

In some regions the ceffyl dŵr was supposedly able to shapeshift into other animals. Sometimes it took the form of a goat and charged at people with enough force to cause serious injury. In the Vale of Clwyd a ceffyl dŵr often transformed into a frog which hopped on people's backs and choked them.

Despite the general association with rivers and waterfalls, the ceffyl dŵr was often seen on seashores, where he was described to be either dapple-grey or sand-like in colour and could be recognised by his hooves being turned the wrong way. He was seen when thunderstorms were brewing, and would turn white or dark silver in very stormy seasons. In some parts of Wales he was more often described as a huge, clumsy, chestnut or piebald horse. Either way, when captured and put to work, after a while the ceffyl dŵr would break free and drag his captor into the sea.

== Folktales ==
One story describes a man, tired from a long journey, stopping by a waterfall from which a water horse with a white mane emerged. He rode the horse, amazed to find that it travelled at the speed of lightning, and after being thrown off realised that he had travelled the distance from Glyn-Neath to the ancient village of Llanddewi Brefi, Cardiganshire in about an hour.

In the story of Arawn, a ceffyl dŵr aids the protagonist. It's described as a miniature horse with a black coat and a white mane which, despite its small stature, carries the protagonist through the air across a vast distance before vanishing and leaving him there.

In the early 19th century an old man was making his way home on a winter's night when he saw a small, solitary horse ridden by a long-legged rider. The horse seemed to glow, and no matter how hard the man tried to overtake it, he couldn't. When the Old Mill the man was travelling to was only an arm's length away, the horse and rider disappeared into the darkness. By midnight the valley was flooded, and the man credited his escape to the ceffyl dŵr who enticed him to walk faster.

It was believed that clergymen and ministers of all denominations could ride a ceffyl dŵr without danger until the desired destination was reached. There is a tale of a parson and parish clerk walking home from Cardiff one night in the 18th century when they found a horse and, believing it to be a stray, decided to ride it to quicken their journey. They rode for a while in silence, but the clerk, amazed by the speed of the horse, complimented it. The horse reared and the parson urged his companion to remain quiet. After a while the clerk spoke again, and the horse bucked him off and carried the parson the rest of the way home.

A similar story comes from Lydmoor, which tells of a travelling minister who, when pausing for rest beside a stream, was joined by a deacon of Trehill Calvinistic Methodist Chapel. Not far from Duffryn the men saw a horse and decided to ride it, as the deacon would be going back the same way the next day and would be able to return it. They rode until Tinkin Wood, where the deacon complained that the horse was getting lazy. The horse reared and he was thrown into the bushes, after which the horse galloped away with the minister still on it.
