= Fossegrim =

Water spirit or troll in Scandinavian folklore

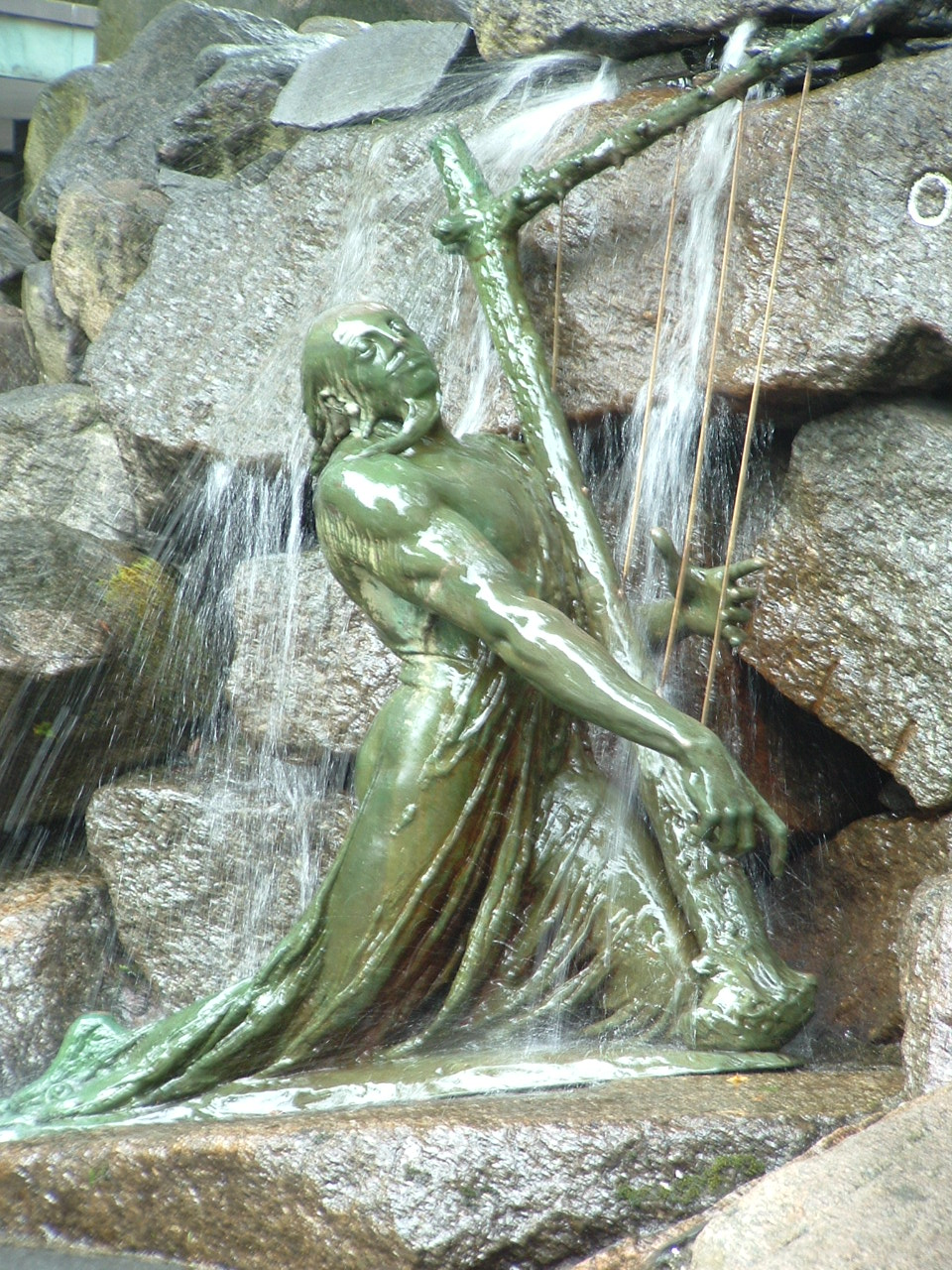
Fossegrim playing a harp in a waterfall under the statue to the violinist Ole Bull in Bergen

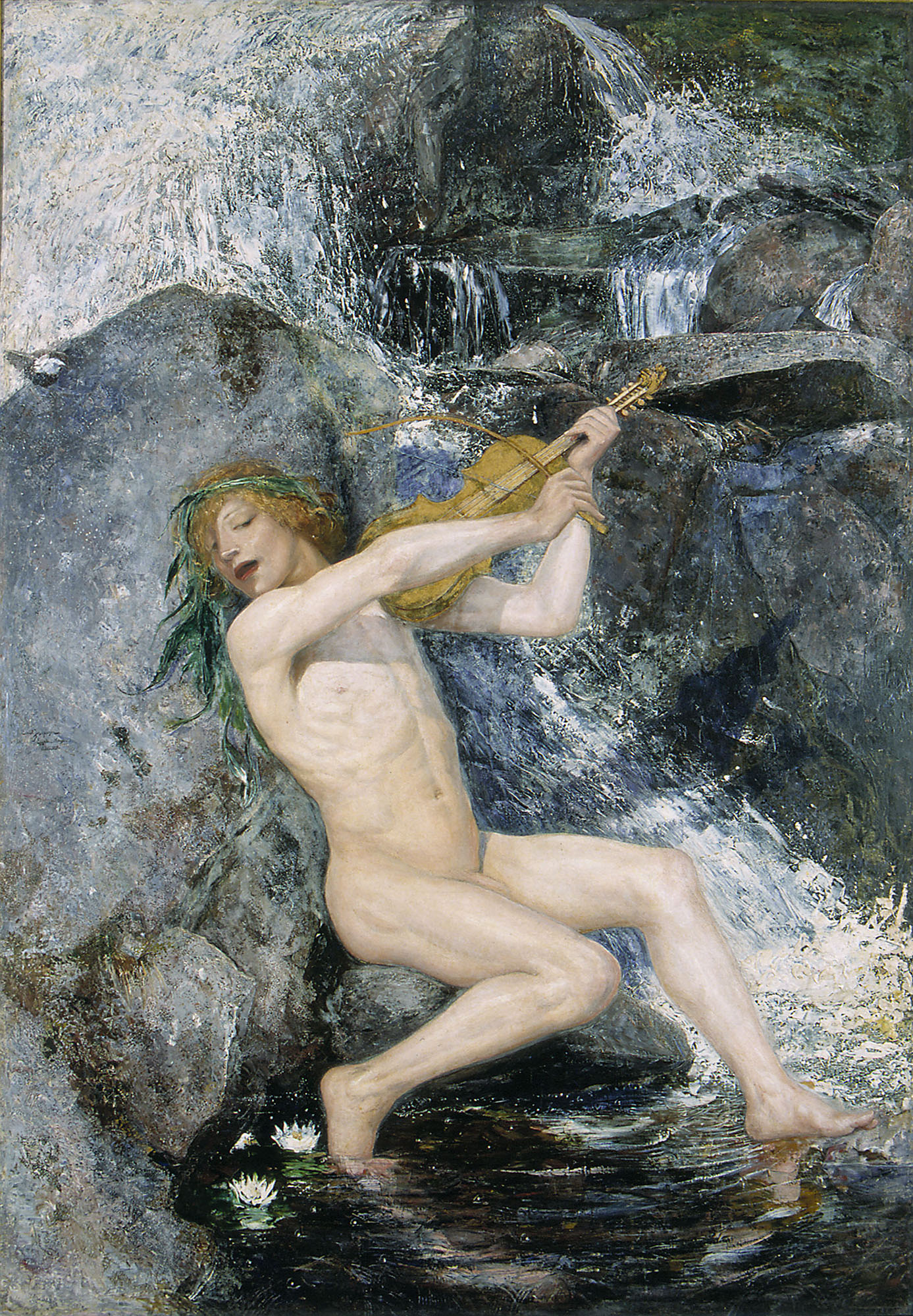
Strömkarlen ("The Stream Man") by Swedish painter Ernst Josephson, 1884

Fossegrim, also known simply as the grim (Norwegian) or Strömkarlen (Swedish), is a water spirit or troll in Scandinavian folklore. He is often depicted as a handsome, nude man playing the fiddle in streams and waterfalls. Fossegrim has been associated with a mill spirit (kvernknurr) and is related to the water spirit (nokken) and is sometimes also called näcken in Sweden.

== Description ==
Fossegrim is described as an exceptionally talented fiddler: the sounds of forest, wind and water play over his fiddle strings. Fossegrims can be induced to teach the skill. The Swedish strömkarl's lay is said to have eleven variations, the final one being reserved for the night spirits because when it is played, "tables and benches, cup and can, gray-beards and grandmothers, blind and lame, even babes in the cradle" will begin to dance.

Fossegrim is said to be willing to teach away his skills in exchange for a food offering made on a Thursday evening and in secrecy: a white he-goat thrown with head turned away into a waterfall that flows northwards, or smoked mutton (fenalår). If there is not enough meat on the bone, he will only teach the supplicant how to tune the fiddle. If the offering is satisfactory, he will take the pupil's right hand and draw the fingers along the strings until they all bleed, after which he will be able to play so well that "the trees shall dance and torrents in their fall stand still".

Jacob Grimm cites a variant in 18th-century Chorographia Bahusiensis by Johan Ödman (1682-1749) according to which the Strömkarlen must be offered redemption or he will merely break his instrument and weep bitterly. Famous fiddlers who were rumored to have learnt from the Fossegrim include Torgeir Augundsson (1801–1872) known as Myllarguten and Ole Bull (1810–1880) whose statue in the centre of Bergen depicts a fossegrim playing his harp under the falling water.

== In popular culture ==
- Dungeons & Dragons introduced the fossegrim, under the name "fossergrim", as a monster in Deities & Demigods (1980).
- Fossegrim is featured in the video game Dark Age of Camelot (2001).
- The Norwegian metal band Kvelertak has a song called "Fossegrim" (2010).
- Fossegrim (Näcken) is featured in the video game Unforgiving: A Northern Hymn (2017).
- Fossegrim is featured in the digital card game Mythgard (2019) as a rare minion in the Norden faction.
- Fossegrim is featured in the video game Röki (2020) in Fossegrim's Cavern.
- Grims are a class of frog-like enemies featured in the video game God of War: Ragnarok (2022).
- Fossegrim is encountered by the protagonist in the video game Bramble: The Mountain King (2023).
- The band Bobtown has a song titled "Fosse Grim" on their album A History of Ghosts (2014), based on the legend.
- Fossegrim is the inspiration for a character named "Fossegrimen" in the video game RuneScape.
