= Water bull =

Mythological Scottish creature

The water bull, also known as tarbh-uisge in Scottish Gaelic, is a mythological Scottish creature similar to the Manx tarroo ushtey and the Irish tarbh-uisce. Generally regarded as a nocturnal resident of moorland lochs, it is usually more amiable than its equine counterpart the water horse, but has similar amphibious and shapeshifting abilities.

The water bull is said to reproduce with standard cattle, the resulting progeny distinguishable by the small size of their ears. According to some myths, the calves of water bulls and ordinary cows ought to be killed at birth by any method other than drowning – they cannot be killed by drowning – to avoid bringing disaster to the herd. Conversely, in northern areas the calves are considered to be of superior quality.

== Etymology ==
Lexicographer Edward Dwelly translates tarbh-uisge from the Scottish Gaelic as "water bull, sea bull or cow" with the addition of "fabulous" within parentheses. The Celtic term for a bull is fairly consistently rendered as tarbh in Scottish Gaelic; tarroo is the Manx variation and tarw is the Welsh equivalent. Uisge is the Scottish Gaelic word for water, river or stream.

== Folk beliefs ==
=== Description and common attributes ===
Belief in the existence of water bulls persisted in Scotland until at least the last quarter of the 19th century. As with many mythological creatures, descriptions are imprecise. The water bull is able to shapeshift into human form, and live on land or in water. It can be a monstrous, malevolent black beast, especially when described as a tarbh-uisge, but not as nasty as the each-uisge or water horse. It can also be amiable and sometimes helpful. It differs from the Manx tarroo ushtey, which is more likely to be a resident of marshland.

As in the case of kelpies and water horses, most myths about water bulls are about males of the species. Occasionally a water cow is mentioned, as in the Highland tale set at Borrodale on Skye, where a water cow was reputed to reside in a small loch. Canine carcases left out to trap the beast were ignored. Sir Walter Scott also refers to a water cow in a story about an attempt to drain Loch na Beiste to kill one believed to be living there.

The Manx water bull mating with an ordinary cow usually results in the death of the cow after she produces a dead and "rude lump of flesh and skin without bones", whereas its Scottish counterpart produces live calves whose only deformity is apparent in their ears. The bulls have no ears themselves and therefore produce calves with only half ears, described by folklorist and Tiree Minister John Gregorson Campbell as "knife-eared". Water cows living at Leverburgh produce offspring with disfigured crimson or purple-coloured ears.

Folklorist John F. Campbell noted a story told on Islay, one of the Inner Hebridean islands, which demonstrates the usefulness of having a water bull. Just after a calf was born to an ordinary cow, an elderly lady, later identified as a witch, advised the herdsman to keep it separate from the other cattle, presumably after she noticed its deformed ears and suspected it was a water bull. She instructed the herdsman to rear the calf on milk from three different cows and to keep it confined in a stable for a minimum of seven years. Years later, a young woman was grazing cattle at a nearby loch when she was approached by an attractive man. He struck up a conversation with her and shortly afterwards the pair sat on the grass with his head resting in her lap, but as he fell asleep she discovered seaweed entwined in his hair, a sign that he was a water horse. She started to run back to the farm. Her suitor awoke, shapeshifted into his true equine form and chased after her. As the woman ran towards the farm, the witch shouted to the herdsman to release the water bull from the stable. The two creatures fought until they fell into the sea. The water horse never returned, but the remains of the bull were found the following day.

=== Capture and killing ===
Accounts of snaring and destroying the beast are rare, as it is not generally considered to be a threat. In 1819 John MacCulloch, a noted geologist, described how inhabitants around the areas of Loch Awe and Loch Rannoch tried to capture a water bull by shackling a sheep to an oak tree as an enticement, but the tackle was not strong enough. Another story describes a farmer and his two sons hunting a water bull. The farmer's musket was filled with silver sixpence coins as the beast can only be killed with silver.

According to Celtic mythology scholar James MacKillop, because the calves of water bulls and ordinary cows might bring disaster to the herd, they are supposed to be killed at birth; it is impossible to kill them by drowning, so other methods have to be used. Conversely, stories published in 1937 by the clergyman George Sutherland suggest these hybrids are considered to be of superior quality to normal pedigree cattle in the far north of Scotland.

== Origins ==
The bull appears to have had a sacred role in a number of Celtic cults. The animal was viewed positively by the Celts as an image of fertility and abundance; one tribe, the Taurini, even adopted the bull's name. It is unknown how it came to be associated with bodies of water in the form of the water bull, but historian and symbologist Charles Milton Smith has suggested that such mythological creatures might originate with the water spouts that can form over the surface of Scottish lochs, which can give the impression of a living form as they move across the water.
