= Nixie (folklore) =

Being in Germanic folklore

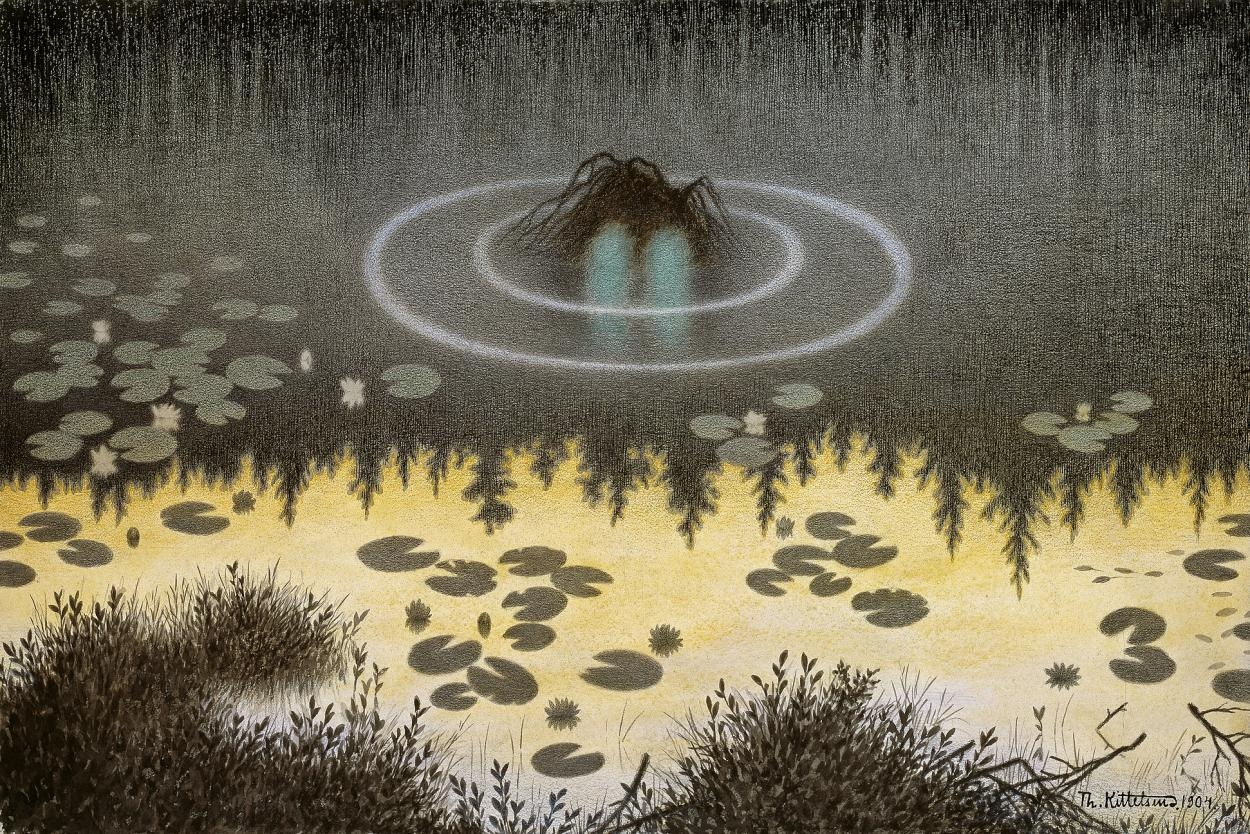
Nøkken by Norwegian artist Theodor Kittelsen, 1904

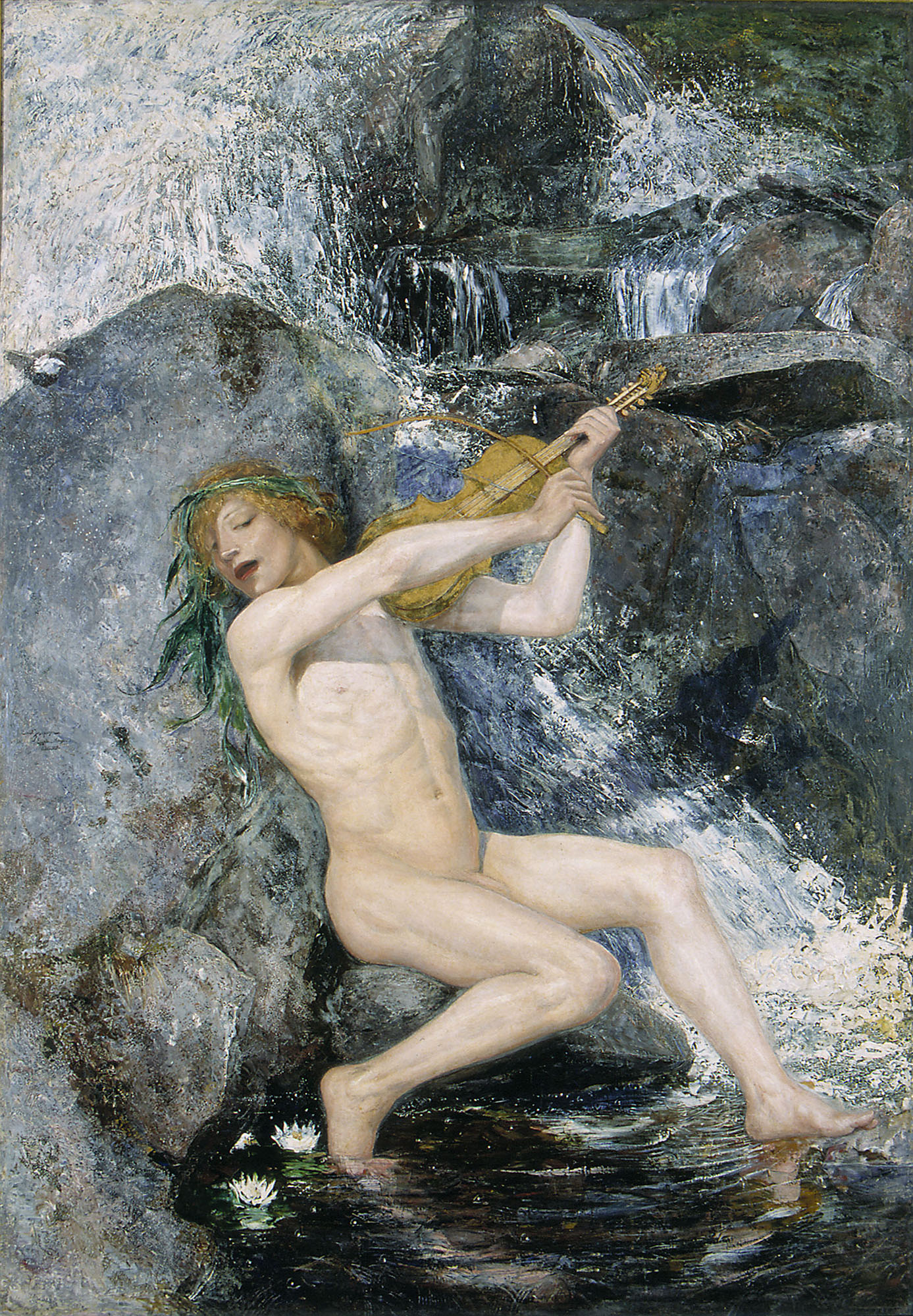
Strömkarlen ("The Man in the Stream") by Swedish painter Ernst Josephson, 1884. In Sweden, the Nixie is often romanticised as a fair naked man, playing music to lure people in.

The nixie, nixy, nix, neck (Note: neck), or nicker (Note: nicker) (Old English: nicor; Danish: nøkke; Dutch: nikker, nekker; Estonian: näkk; Faroese: nykur; Finnish: näkki; German: Nixe; Icelandic: nykur; Norwegian Bokmål: nøkk, nøkken; Nynorsk: nykk; Swedish: näck, näcken, French: neckre), are humanoid, and often shapeshifting, water spirits in Germanic mythology and folklore.

Under a variety of names, they are common to the stories of all Germanic peoples, although they are perhaps best known from Scandinavian folklore. The related English knucker was generally depicted as a worm or dragon, although more recent versions depict the spirits in other forms. Their sex, bynames, and various transformations vary geographically. The German Nix and Scandinavian counterparts were male. The German Nixe was a female river mermaid. Similar creatures are known from other parts of Europe, such as the Melusine in France, the Xana in Asturias (Spain), and the Slavic water spirits (e.g., the Rusalka) in Slavic countries.

== Names and etymology ==
The names are held to derive from Proto-Germanic *nikwus or *nikwis(i), derived from Proto-Indo-European *neigʷ ("to wash"). They are related to Sanskrit nḗnēkti, Greek νίζω nízō and νίπτω níptō, and Irish nigh (all meaning to wash or be washed).

The form neck appears in English, as well as in Swedish, although spelled as näck (definite form näcken). The Swedish form is derived from Old Swedish neker, which corresponds to Old Icelandic nykr (gen. nykrs), and nykk in Norwegian Nynorsk. In Finnish, the word is näkki. In Old Danish, the form was nikke and in modern Danish and Norwegian Bokmål it is nøkke or nøkk. The Icelandic and Faroese nykur are horselike creatures. In Middle Low German, it was called necker and in Middle Dutch nicker (modern Dutch: nikker, compare also Nickel or Nikkel plus Kobolt). The Old High German form nihhus also meant "crocodile", while the Old English nicor could mean both a "water monster" like those encountered by Beowulf, and a "hippopotamus". The Norwegian Fossegrim and Swedish Strömkarlen are related figures sometimes seen as by-names for the same creature. The southern Swedish (Scanian) version can take on the form of a horse named Bäckahästen ("the brook horse"), similar to other water horses such as the Scottish kelpie and the Welsh Ceffyl Dŵr.

The modern English form nixie stems from German: Nixe (feminine form of Nix), from Middle High German: nixe, from an earlier nickes, from Old High German: nicchessa (feminine form of nichus, nihhus), meaning "water-spirit, water-elf, crocodile".

== England ==
English folklore contains many creatures with similar characteristics to the Nix or Näck. These include Jenny Greenteeth, the Shellycoat, the river-hag Peg Powler, the Bäckahäst-like Brag, and the Grindylow.

At Lyminster, near Arundel in the English county of West Sussex, there are today said to dwell "water-wyrms" called knuckers, in a pool called the Knucker-hole. The Victorian authority Walter William Skeat had plausibly suggested the pool's name of knucker (a name attested from 1835, Horsfield) was likely derived from the Old English nicor, a creature-name found in Beowulf.

== Nordic folklore ==
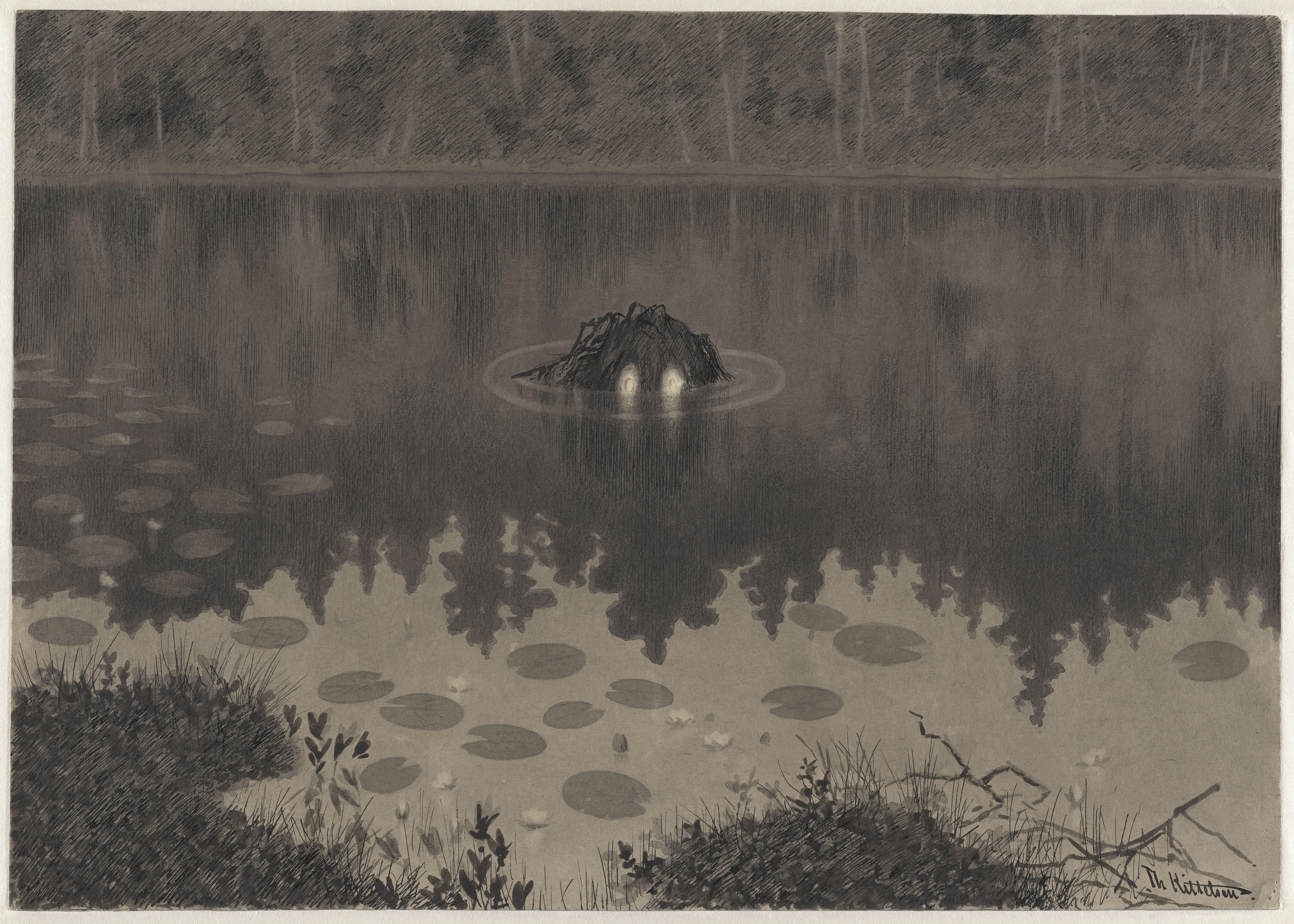
"The Water Sprite" by Norwegian Theodor Kittelsen (1857–1914)

The Nordic nixies (Danish: nøkke, Norwegian: nøkk, Swedish: näck; Icelandic: nykur, Faroese: nykur; Finnish: näkki) are male water spirits who play enchanted songs on instruments, luring women and children to drown in lakes or streams. Such can also drown people directly by dragging them down into water (compare brunnsgubben, "the well man", from Sweden and Finland, and the Sami rávga). However, not all of these spirits were necessarily malevolent; many stories indicate at the very least that nixies were entirely harmless to their audience and attracted not only women and children but men as well with their sweet songs. Stories also exist wherein the spirit agrees to live with a human who had fallen in love with him. Still, many of these stories ended with the nixie returning to his home, usually a nearby waterfall or brook. The nixie were said to grow despondent unless they had free, regular contact with a water source.

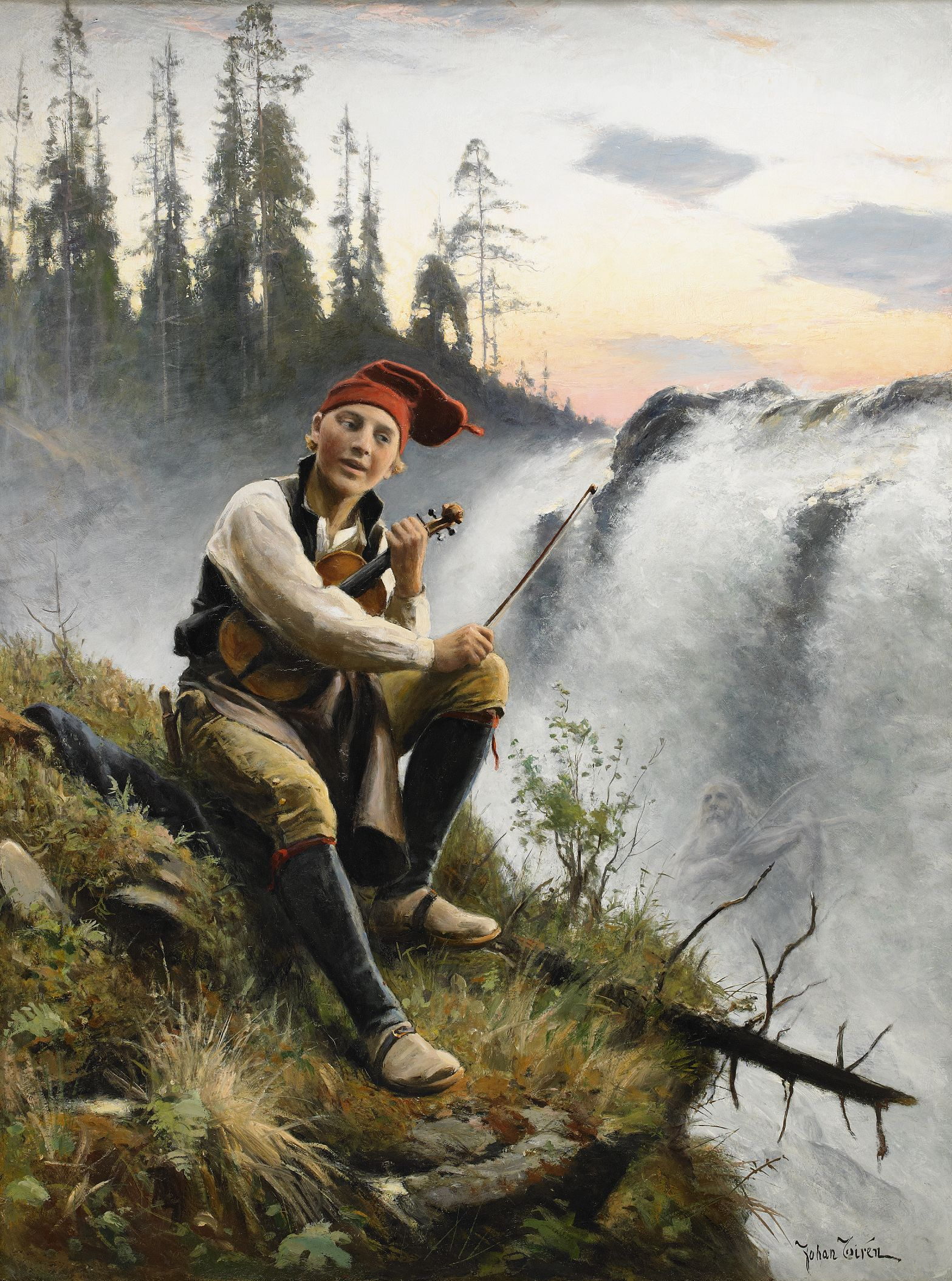
Näcken ("The Nixie") by Johan Tirén (1853–1911), featuring a young boy learning violin from The Nixie in the waterfall.

The Norwegian Fossegrim or Grim, Swedish Näcken ("The Nixie") or Strömkarlen, is a related powerful figure, a powerful nature spirit, who, if properly approached, will teach a musician to play so adeptly "that the trees dance and waterfalls stop at his music".

It is difficult to describe the appearance of the nix, as one of his central attributes was thought to be shapeshifting. Perhaps he did not have any true shape. He could show himself as a man playing the violin in brooks and waterfalls (though often imagined as fair and naked today, in folklore, he was more frequently described as wearing more or less elegant clothing) but also could appear to be treasure or various floating objects, or as an animal—most commonly in the form of a "brook horse" (see below). The modern Scandinavian names are derived from nykr, meaning "river horse". Thus, it is likely that the figure of the brook horse preceded the personification of the nix as the "man in the rapids". Fossegrim and derivatives were almost always portrayed as gorgeous young men whose clothing (or lack thereof) varied widely from story to story.

The enthralling music of the nixie was most dangerous to women and children, especially pregnant women and unbaptised children. He was thought to be most active during Midsummer's Night, Christmas Eve, and Thursdays. However, these superstitions do not necessarily relate to all the versions listed here. Many, if not all, developed after the Christianizing of the northern countries, as was the case of similar stories of faeries and other entities in other areas. When malicious nixies attempted to carry off people, they could be defeated by calling their name; this was believed to cause their death. Another belief was that if a person bought the nixie a treat of three drops of blood, a black animal, some brännvin (Nordic spirit) or snus (wet snuff) dropped into the water, he would teach his enchanting form of music.

The nixie was also an omen for drowning accidents. He would scream at a particular spot in a lake or river in a way reminiscent of the loon, and a fatality would later occur on that spot. He was also said to cause drownings, but swimmers could protect themselves against such a fate by throwing a bit of steel into the water.

In the later Romantic folklore and folklore-inspired stories of the 19th century, the nixie sings about his loneliness and his longing for salvation, which he purportedly never shall receive, as he is not "a child of God". In a poem by Swedish poet E. J. Stagnelius, a little boy pities the fate of the nixie, and so saves his own life. In the poem, arguably Stagnelius's most famous, the boy says that the nixie will never be a "child of God", which brings "tears to his face" as he "never plays again in the silvery brook".

On a similar theme, a 19th-century text called "Brother Fabian's Manuscript" by Sebastian Evans has this verse:

Where by the marishes boometh the bittern,
Neckar the soulless one sits with his ghittern.
Sits inconsolable, friendless and foeless.
Waiting his destiny, – Neckar the soulless. (Note: The source has "bloometh" for "boometh", but this is an error; a bittern is not a plant but a bird, and it is known for its booming call. A "ghittern" is a guitar. The spelling "Nickar" vice "Neckar" is sometimes used.)

In Scandinavia, water lilies are called "nixie roses" (Norwegian: nøkkeroser, Swedish: näckrosor). A tale from the forest of Tiveden, Sweden, relates that a father promised his daughter to a nixie who offered him great hauls of fish in a time of need; she refused and stabbed herself to death, staining the water lilies red from that time on:

At the lake of Fagertärn, there was once a poor fisherman who had a beautiful daughter. The small lake gave little fish and the fisherman had difficulties providing for his little family. One day, as the fisherman was fishing in his little dugout of oak, he met The Nixie, who offered him great catches of fish on the condition that the fisherman gave him his beautiful daughter the day she was eighteen years old. The desperate fisherman agreed and promised The Nixie his daughter. The day the girl was eighteen she went down to the shore to meet The Nixie. The Nixie gladly asked her to walk down to his watery abode, but the girl took forth a knife and said that he would never have her alive, then stuck the knife into her heart and fell down into the lake, dead. Then, her blood coloured the water lilies red, and from that day the water lilies of some of the lake's forests are red.

=== Swedish and Finnic folklore ===
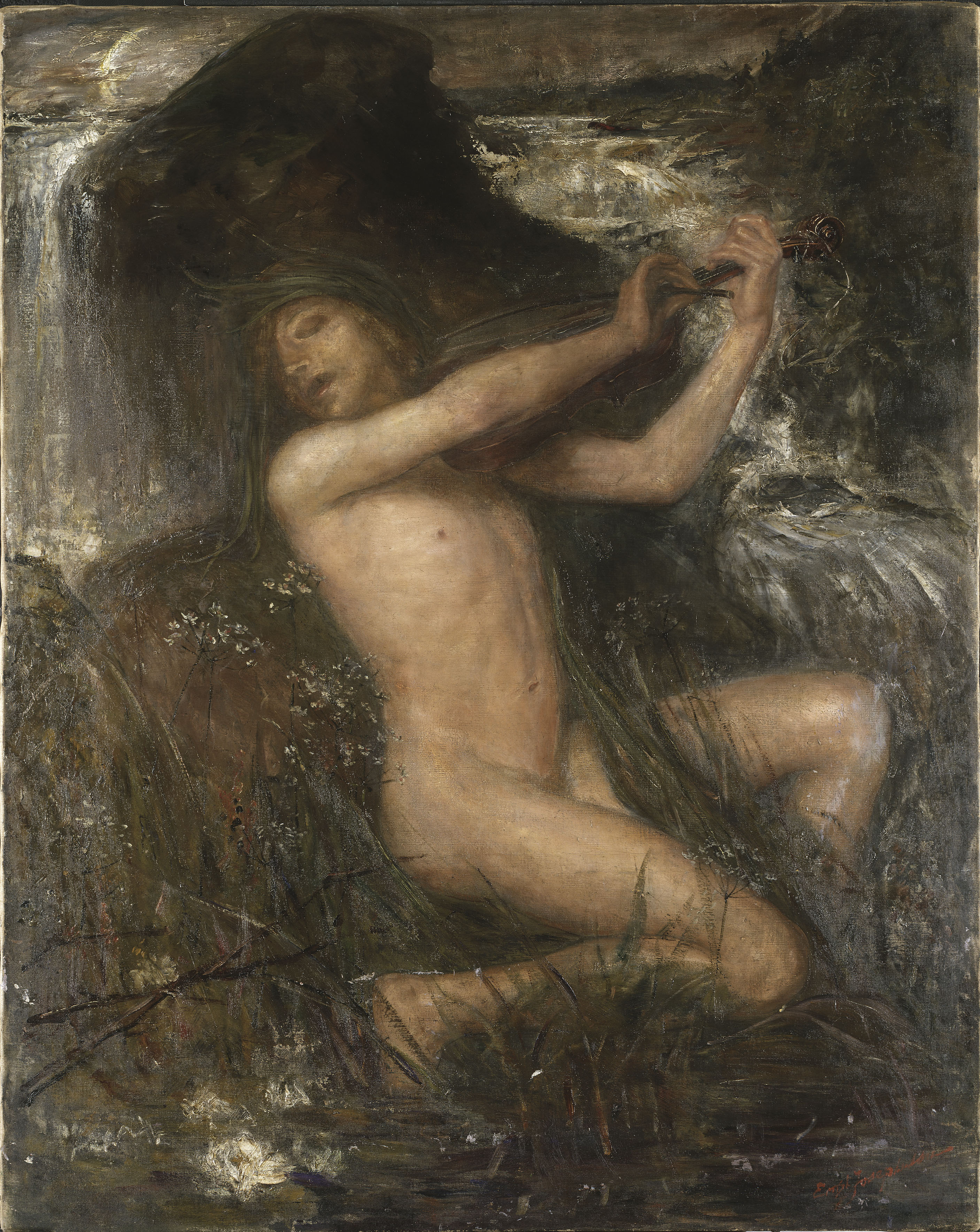
Näcken ("The Water Sprite") by Ernst Josephson, 1882

In Sweden, nixies (Swedish: näck) are said to be water spirits, or similar, living in lakes and streams. By some accounts, they take the shape of gnomes (Swedish: tomte), but they are also said to appear in the shape of animals, most often in black or white, such as a dog, a cat, a bull, a horse, among others (compare strömkatten, "the stream cat"; see the brook horse). It can also take the shape of inanimate objects, like any floating object or treasure. A trait shared with other folk beliefs is that the animal forms sometimes appears with three legs.

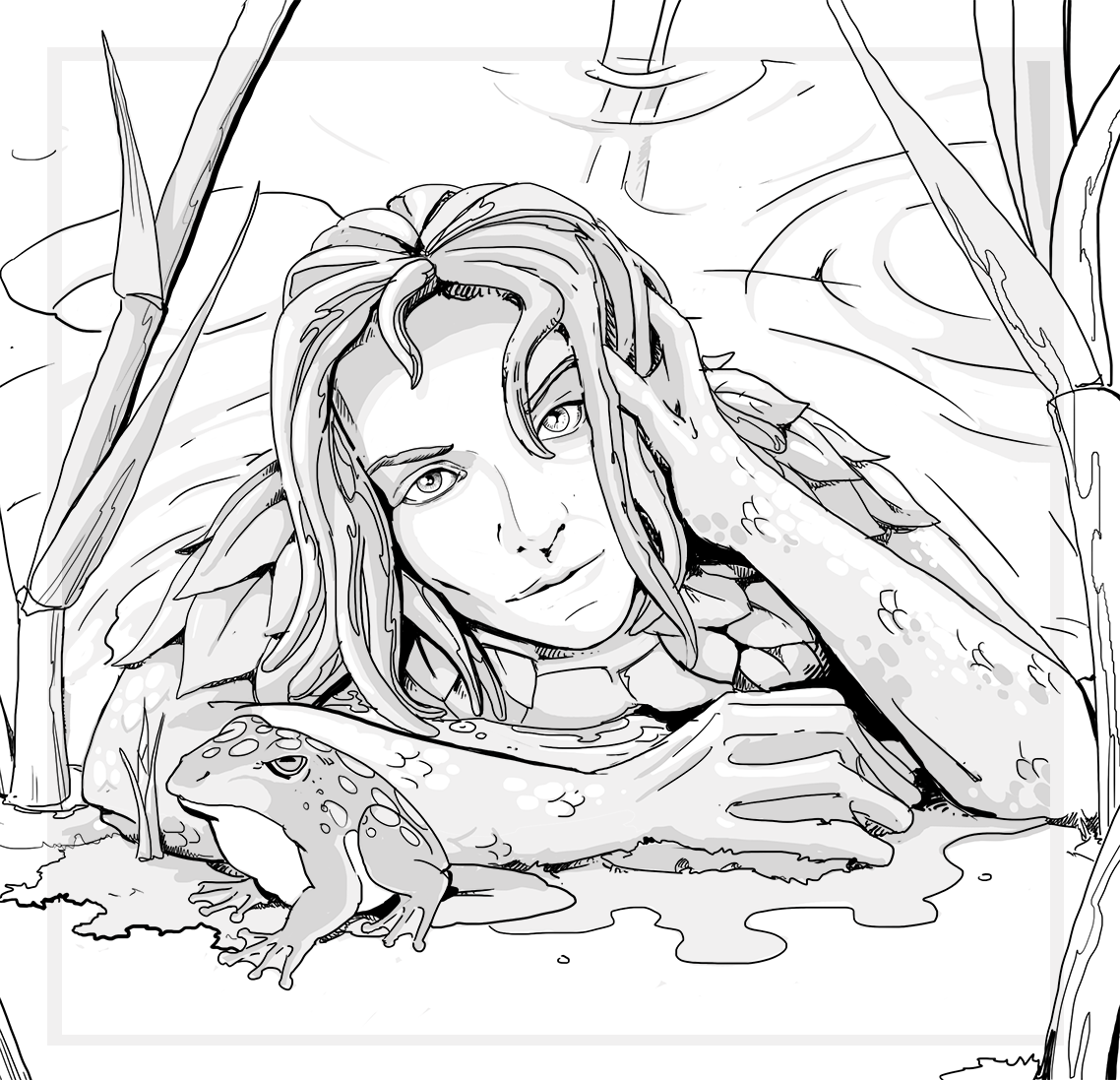
Drawing of the Nixie with aquatic plants for hair. The Nixie is said to have green hair or foliage in the hair.

Beyond minor or regional spirits, there is also a major collective nature spirit known as Näcken ("The Nixie"), or Strömkarlen ("The Stream Man"), among others (in Norway Fossegrim), appearing as a slender young or old undressed man, the latter bearded, sitting on a rock near water, masterfully playing an instrument to lure people, especially women, to and into water. He can play many instruments, with the instrument varying, such as a horn, a flute, a harmonica, etc, but most commonly a violin or similar. The hair color varies but is often said to be green, or rather made of foliage, with other hair colors worth mentioning being red. The Nixie is both powerful and dangerous in its abilities, bordering on being a quasi-deity. Even in shallow water, it can lock peoples' footing in place. Other names include: bäckamannen ("the brook man"), dammapågen ("the dam boy"), trasken, nixen, ellen, neken" forskarlen ("the rapid man"), gölamannen ("the pool man"), kvarngubbe ("watermill man"), kvarnrå ("watermill rå"), strömkatten ("the stream cat"), älven ("the river") etc.

To protect oneself against the powers of Näcken, it is said that one must stick a knife in the ground before entering the water to swim. If one does not, Näcken can overpower you and drown you. If one fiddler wants to learn to play like Näcken, he should go to a stream three Thursday nights in a row, sit down and play. The first two nights nothing will happen, but on the third, Näcken shows up. The fiddler must bring a black cat as offering. He who survives the class without being drowned, will be able to play so moving that even chairs and tables start to dance.

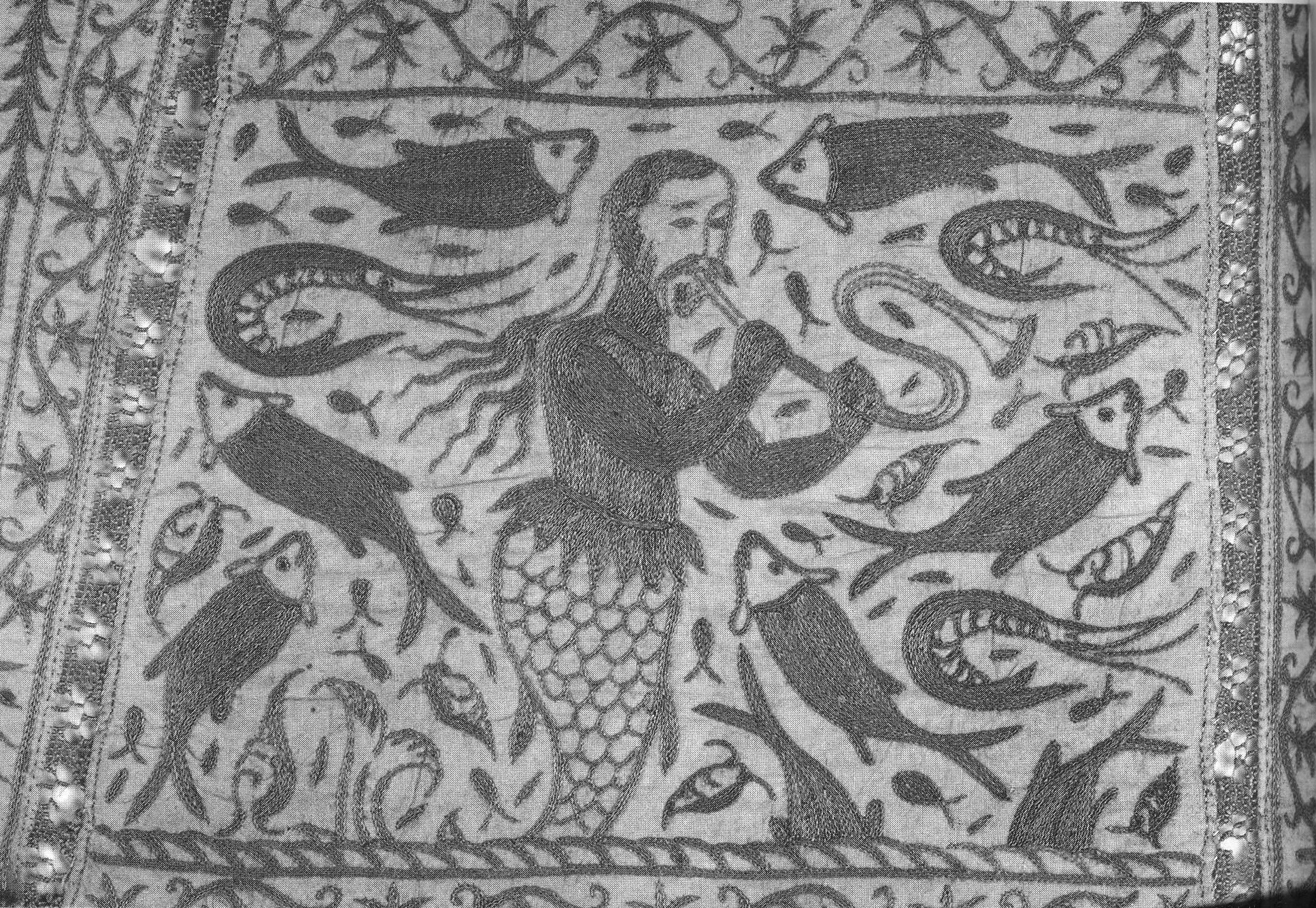
A depiction of The Nixie, playing a horn, on the altar cloth of the Ii church, in North Ostrobothnia, Finland

The Swedish näck was loaned into Finnish as näkki and Estonian as näkk. Näkki was seen as a water haltija, primarily depicting the dangerous side of a water spirit. It lay in ambush for swimmers it could pull down to its underwater kingdom, drowning them. It was common to say "näkki onto the land, me into the water" before going swimming and the other way around when coming back onto land; this was also learned from Swedes. Näkki also made its way into runic songs where a disease was cast away into the black mud in water, where the dog of water and näkki of water would catch it.

In North Karelia, a distinction was sometimes made with water spirits, as a näkki grabbed onto a swimmer while a vetehinen caught the swimmer as an illness. Näkki was also considered a newer name for vetehinen who one could see sitting on a rock, brushing its long hair, before drowning. In South Karelia, this creature was thought to be veden emo 'mother of water'.

In Estonia, it was thought that näkks originated from children thrown into the water by their mothers, those who drowned themselves, and those submerged by previous näkks. This motif is also found in other Nordic folklore, like the Sami rávga. In southeastern Estonia, the corpses of those who suffered a violent death were called näkks: the corpses still held their spirits as prisoners. If one sat or laid on ground where such a corpse had been buried, one would fall ill and die: this was caused by a maanäkk 'land näkk'. If one swam over a drowned corpse, one suffered a cramp in the leg as the veenäkk 'water näkk' grabbed onto them. There were also soonäkk 'bog näkk' and arunäkk 'dry grassland näkk'.

=== The brook horse ===
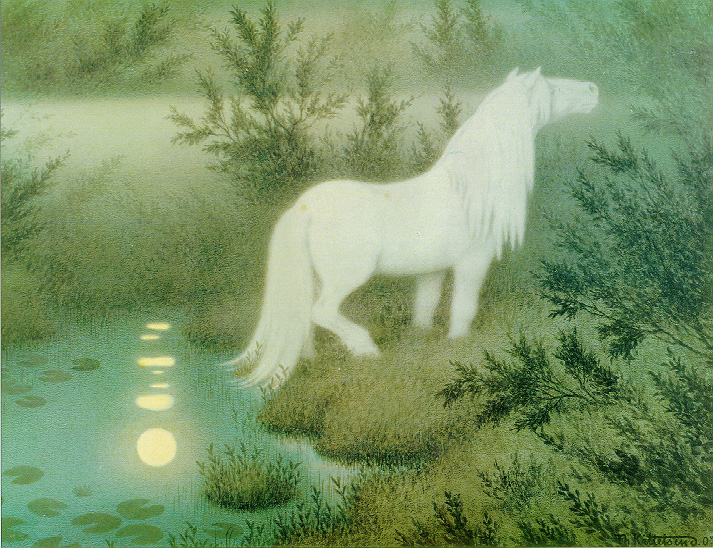
The Neck as a brook horse, painted by Theodor Kittelsen.

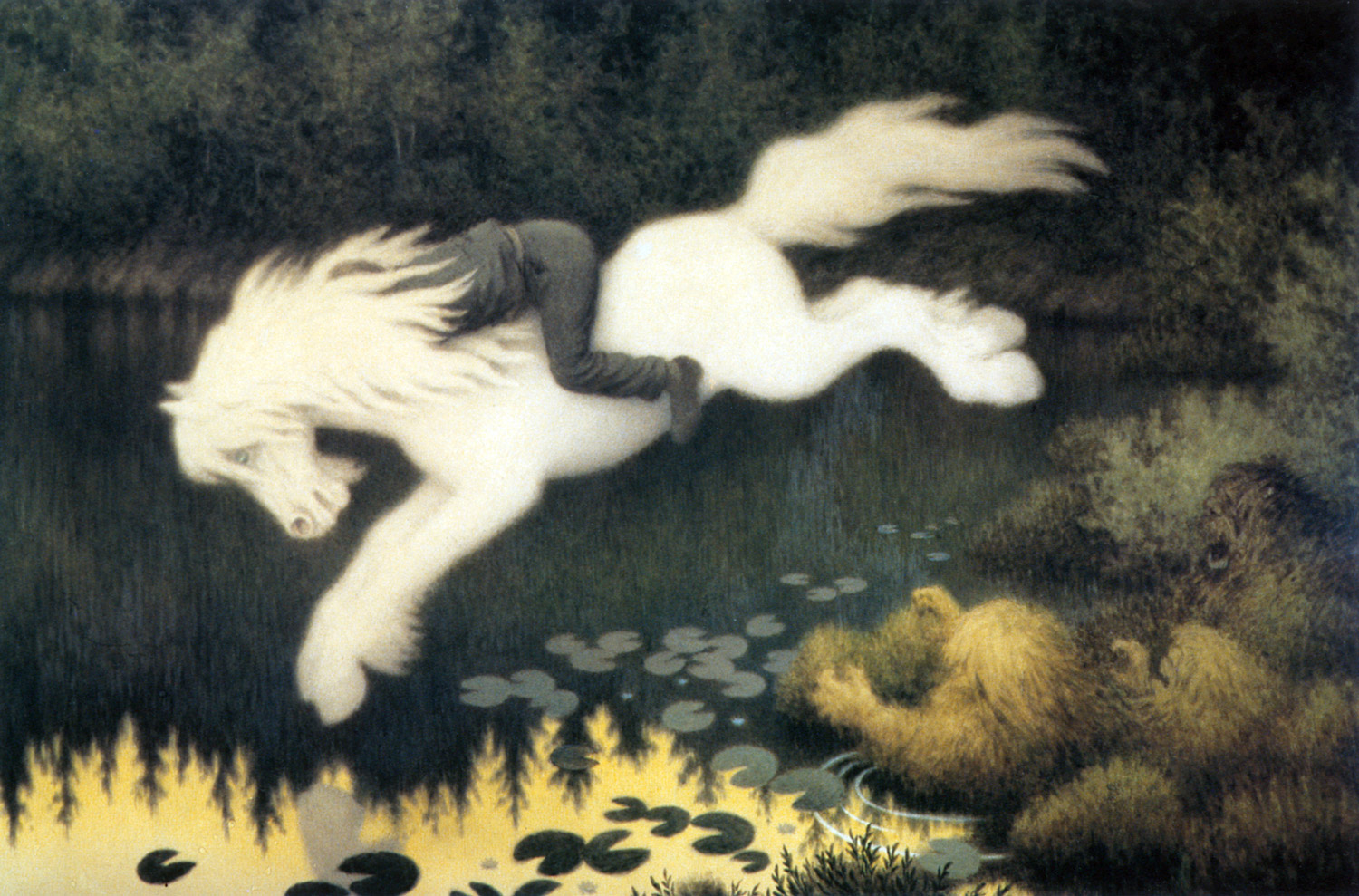
Gutt på hvit hest (Boy on white horse) by Theodor Kittelsen.

One of the more infamous shapes, in which the Nordic nixie appears in, is "the brook horse" (Swedish: bäckahästen, åhästen), also simply referred to as nixie (especially Faroese: nykur). It has a close parallel in the Scottish kelpie and the Welsh Ceffyl Dŵr.

The bäckahäst was often described as a majestic white horse that would appear near rivers, particularly during foggy weather. Anyone who climbed onto its back could not get off again. The horse would then jump into the river, drowning the rider. The brook horse could also be harnessed and made to plough, either because it was trying to trick a person or because the person had tricked the horse into it. The following tale is a good illustration of the brook horse:

A long time ago, there was a girl who was not only pretty but also big and strong. She worked as a maid on a farm by Lake Hjärtasjön in southern Nerike. She was ploughing with the farm's horse on one of the fields by the lake. It was springtime and beautiful weather. The birds chirped, and the wagtails flitted in the girl's and the horse's tracks to pick worms. All of a sudden, a horse appeared out of the lake. It was big and beautiful, bright in colour and with large spots on the sides. The horse had a beautiful mane which fluttered in the wind and a tail that trailed on the ground. The horse pranced for the girl to show her how handsome he was. However, the girl knew it was the brook horse and ignored it. Then the brook horse came closer and closer, and finally he was so close that he could bite the farm horse in the mane. The girl hit the brook horse with the bridle and cried: "Disappear you scoundrel, or you'll have to plough so you'll never forget it." As soon as she had said this, the brook horse had changed places with the farm horse, and the brook horse started ploughing the field with such speed that soil and stones whirled in its wake, and the girl hung like a mitten from the plough. Faster than the cock crows seven times, the ploughing was finished, and the brook horse headed for the lake, dragging both the plough and the girl. But the girl had a piece of steel in her pocket, and she made the sign of the cross. Immediately she fell down on the ground and saw the brook horse disappear into the lake with the plough. She heard a frustrated neighing when the brook horse understood his trick had failed. Until this day, a deep track can be seen in the field.

In Faroese and Icelandic, the word nykur ("nixie") specifically refers to the "brook horse", described in one Faroese text as the following:

The nykur dwells in water; at the bottom, down in the depths, he has his lair; from here he often goes onto land and it is not good to meet him.

Sometimes he is like a beautiful little horse which seems to be good and tame, and thus he lures people to draw near to him to pat him and stroke him along the back. But when they come to touch the tail, they become stuck fast to him, and then he releases no-one, but he drags them with him to the bottom of the water.

Sometimes he encounters people in human form, as a handsome youth, to lure young women to himself, and promises them joy and gladness in his hall if they want to go along with him. But if they get a suspicion of who he is, when they are giving themselves away, such that they can call him by his true name — nykur — then he loses the power over them and must release them and go along into his waters.

It is said that the nykur can equally well change itself into the form of all quadrupedal animals, except that he does not know how to create the horn-points of a ram or a male lamb on himself.

But when he hasn't changed his form, he is like a horse, and it has come about that people gain power over him by carving a cross into his back, and then they have been able to have him drag great stones by his tail down from the mountains to homesteads or houses. Some are still seen in Húsavík in Sandoy and on Eiði in Eysturoy and the big rocks that are gathered together there bear witness to how strong he is. At Takmýri in Sandoy lies one huge rock, which they wanted to have him draw to Húsavík, but his tail broke here, and the stone remains there. One part of the nykur's tail, which was attached to the stone, is visible on it still.

== German folklore ==
The German Nix and Nixe (and Nixie) are types of river mermen and mermaids who may lure men into drowning, like the Scandinavian type, akin to the Melusine and similar to the Greek Siren. The German epic Nibelungenlied mentions the nix in connection with the Danube, as early as 1180 to 1210.

Nixes in folklore became water sprites who try to lure people into the water. The males can assume many different shapes, including that of a human, a fish, and a snake. The females bear the tail of a fish. When they are in human form, they can be recognised by the wet hem of their clothes. The Nixes are portrayed as malicious in some stories but harmless and friendly in others.

The 1779 poem Der Fischer by Johann Wolfgang von Goethe treats of a fisherman who meets his end when he is lured into the water by a Nixe.

By the 19th century, Jacob Grimm mentions the Nixie to be among the "water-sprites" who love music, song, and dancing, and says, "Like the sirens, the Nixie by her song draws listening youth to herself, and then into the deep." According to Grimm, they can appear human but have the barest hint of animal features: the nix had "a slit ear", and the Nixie had "a wet skirt". Grimm thinks these could symbolise they are "higher beings" who could shapeshift to animal form.

One famous Nixe of recent German folklore, deriving from 19th-century literature, was Lorelei; according to the legend, she sat on the rock at the Rhine which now bears her name and lured fishermen and boatmen to the dangers of the reefs with the sound of her voice. In Switzerland, there is a legend of a sea-maid or Nixe that lived in Lake Zug (the lake is in the Canton of Zug).

The Yellow Fairy Book by Andrew Lang includes a story called "The Nixie of the Mill-Pond" in which a malevolent spirit that lives in a mill pond strikes a deal with the miller that she will restore his wealth in exchange for his son. This story is taken from Grimms' Fairy Tales.

The legend of Heer Halewijn, a dangerous lord who lures women to their deaths with a magic song, may have originated with the nix.

Alternate names for the female German Nixe are Rhine maidens (German: Rheintöchter) and Lorelei.

In a fictional depiction, the Rhine maidens are among the protagonists in the four-part Opera Der Ring des Nibelungen by the composer Richard Wagner, based loosely on the nix of the Nibelungenlied.

The Rhine maidens Wellgunde, Woglinde, and Floßhilde (Flosshilde) belong to a group of characters living in a part of nature free from human influence. Erda and the Norns are also considered a part of this 'hidden' world.

They are first seen in the first work of the Nibelungen cycle, Das Rheingold, as guardians of the Rheingold, a treasure of gold hidden in the Rhein river. The dwarf Alberich, a Nibelung, is eager to win their favour, but they somewhat cruelly dismiss his flattery. They tell him that only one who cannot love can win the Rheingold. Thus, Alberich curses love and steals the Rheingold. From the stolen gold, he forges a ring of power. Further in the cycle, the Rhine maidens are seen trying to regain the ring and transform it into the harmless Rheingold. But no one will return the ring to them; not even the supreme god Wotan, who uses the ring to pay the giants Fasolt and Fafner for building Valhalla, nor the hero Siegfried, when the maidens appear to him in the third act of Götterdämmerung. Eventually, Brünnhilde returns it to them at the end of the cycle, when the fires of her funeral pyre cleanse the ring of its curse.

Descendants of German immigrants to Pennsylvania sometimes refer to a mischievous child as "nixie".

== In popular culture ==
Tove Jansson's first published picture book, her 1933 Sara and Pelle and Neptune's Children, the protagonists visit the Nixie's realm, the "underwater land", and are put in charge of the smallest octopuses.

In the 2007 book The Nixie's Song, the first in the children's series Beyond the Spiderwick Chronicles, the main characters rescue a Nixie named Taloa after fire-breathing giants destroy her pond. Nixies are depicted as aquatic female humanoids related to mermaids but with frog-like legs instead of tails.

In the 2015 video game Tom Clancy's Rainbow Six Siege, there is a Danish operator named Nøkk. During gameplay she uses a glove attachment called HEL to disappear from cameras and sneak up on enemies.

In the 2019 film Frozen II, Queen Elsa of Arendelle encounters and tames the Nøkk (in the form of a horse), the water spirit who guards the sea to the mythical river Ahtohallan.

The 2023 video game Bramble: The Mountain King features a minor antagonist called Näcken, a monstrous water-dwelling violinist who hunts the protagonist. In his prior life as a human, Näcken was bullied by the fellow inhabitants of his village, on whom he took revenge by playing a magical tune, inflicting a dancing mania.

In the 2025 horror novel, The Haunting of Payne Hollow, by Kelley Armstrong, protagonist Sam, discovers that her family history is intertwined with legends of Nekker at her family’s property on Lake Ontario. The Nekker appear as the drowned, dead, offered to the lake, and are under the command of a headless horseman. The horseman’s appearance in the tale crosses over with legends of water horses, as well as the lore of Sleepy Hollow.

== See also ==
- Årets Näck, a Swedish competition where contestants play music whilst dressed as Näcken
- Hulder, an enchanting nature spirit in Nordic folklore
- Kelpie, a shapeshifting water fairy that takes the form of a horse to drown victims
- Sjörå, a Scandinavian water spirit
- Fossegrim, a waterfall spirit that lures prey into the water
- Nāga, a snake-like Asian water deity
- Naiad, a Greek water nymph
- Grindylow, a vicious goblin that haunts English ponds
- Kappa, a monkey- or turtle-like river sprite in Japanese mythology
- Nuckelavee, a centaur-like sea demon from the Orkney and Shetland Isles
- Rusalka, a murderous Slavic water nymph
- Selkie, a seal that can take on human form in the Celtic and Scandinavian countries
- Taniwha, a New Zealand serpentine sea beast
- Undine, a water nymph
- Wetlands and islands in Germanic paganism
