= Scottish folklore =

Folk culture of Scotland

Scottish folklore (Scottish Gaelic: Beul-aithris na h-Alba) encompasses the folklore of the Scottish people from their earliest records until today. Folklorists, both academic and amateur, have published a variety of works focused specifically on the area over the years. Some creatures of Scottish folklore are the Loch Ness Monster, brownies, bogles, kelpies, selkies, the wulver, the bean-nighe, and the blue men of the Minch.

== Background ==
There are many regional differences in Scottish folklore, some ancient, and some more modern which, according to James Porter, "[stems] mainly from the great watershed of the eighteenth century when agricultural improvement began substantially to alter the character of the region". Additionally, Scottish history has been fraught with transformation due to the Highland Clearances in the nineteenth century and battles over ownership such as the Battle of Culloden. The Battle of Culloden, in 1746, as well as the Battle of Harlaw in 1411 and the Massacre of Glencoe in 1692, were historical traumas which have made their mark in Highland oral tradition and culture through songs and narratives. The resulting "depopulation, language suppression, and the ambivalence of bodies such as the Society in Scotland for Propagating Christian Knowledge, and the subsequent decline of Gaelic" have had major effects on the passage of tradition and folklore. A prominent example of the effect of these forced movements of Scottish people occurred with the population of St Kilda, an island located 100 miles west of the Hebrides. They were evacuated on 29 August 1930 to Larachbeg in Morvern on mainland Scotland. These primarily Gaelic-speaking people were taken away from any view of the sea "and employed as forestry workers in an utterly different way of life."

Folklore and folk belief are "intimately related to power relations in society". Scotland has struggled with invaders, "'improvers' or absentee landowners" for much of their history, evoking questions on who actually owns Scotland and their culture. Through the passing on of oral history in both fishing and farming communities, beliefs, ballads, and folklore are passed on through the generations. However, there has been an erosion in the passing of oral history, which noted oral historian J. F. Campbell attributed to "the nature of school education and the proliferation of print culture" as well as "to the rise of technology, the railroad in particular". Campbell noted that the work attributed to the industrial revolution disrupted "communal work in which storytelling often took place" and that "the chatter of communal labor was being drowned out by the hum of machinery". Although these beliefs are not as common, collectors such as J. F. Campbell, Andrew Lang, Hugh Miller and others have dedicated themselves to recording these traditions and stories. Andrew Lang holds the belief that "superstitions contain aesthetic, psychological and cultural elements that are far more than irrational curiosities on the stepladder of civilization from primitive magic to enlightened science". Due to Scotland's regional differences, oral studies have "provided insights into the local and the specific, unique, particular cultures of place… framed in the local context". The Highlands and the Scottish Islands have been particularly isolated due to their location, offering a "wealth of Scottish folklore" for collectors of oral history. Through the study of folklore and folk belief, Scotland's culture "displays a world-view that integrated local history, Gaelic heroism, Christian piety, worldly wit and creativity into a shared vision to inspire, entertain, and educate the community".

== Folklore related to place ==
There are various stories, beliefs, and superstitions associated with Scottish folklore, often linked to specific geographical locations and specific stones. According to Porter, "place is both 'internal' and 'external' to the human subject, a personally embedded centre of meanings and a physical locus for action". Many of these sacred places are stones with specific unique features, such as the Clach-na-bhan, which is a large granite rock located on top of Meall-na-gineimh (sandy hill) in Glenavon. This stone's unique feature is that it is shaped like an armchair and has been associated with easy delivery during childbirth. "Women about to be mothers climbed the hill and seated themselves in the hollow believing this ensured them an easy delivery". A second case of a sacred stone is the "Deil's needle", a standing stone in the River Dee at Dinnet. This stone had a hole about eighteen inches in diameter which was believed to have "the power to transform a childless wife, who passed through the eye of the stone, into a mother", effectively curing a woman's sterility. Stone circles were also widely regarded as sacred. The Stones of Stenness, located near the Loch of Harray, and the Ring of Brodgar, located northeast of the Stenness, were notable stone circles. According to Robert Henry, a minister at a nearby parish, these specific stone circles "were the reputed scene of courting and healing rituals that looked to pre-Christian gods such as Odin". There was a widely held belief that stones were under "special care of the spirit world" and river stones were "believed to possess remarkable powers [and] were often blackened in the fire and used with incantations to bring harm".

In addition to specific stones, there are specific creatures or myths associated with specific locations. One such myth is about the 'Black Officer', known as An t-Othaichear Dubh, the Gaelic name given to Captain John Macpherson of Ballachroan, who was "a recruiting officer of the Hanoverian government around 1800 and a reputed hireling of the Devil." This story is tied to the Forest of Gaick, located near Blair Atholl in the middle of Scotland; however, the tale is widespread throughout Scotland, reaching the Isle of Skye and South Uist. The tale attributes his "grisly end, with that of companions at Gaick as an avalanche that carried them away" as divine retaliation. Loch Ness, located in the Highlands, is another location linked to a specific creature of myth, the Loch Ness monster, referred to familiarly as Nessie.

== Folklore related to water ==
There are a variety of myths, creatures, and superstitions associated with the numerous lochs, rivers, and seas throughout Scotland. According to J. M. Harris, in Scottish folklore, water represents "both a supernatural threat and defense [which] exemplifies the riddle of deciphering the code of the many checks and balances of folk beliefs". Borders, such as the shore, are believed to be "the realm where the known and unknown worlds collide." This belief is thought to have come from the ever present anxiety that "invaders must enter a land at its borders," offering an explanation as to why so many folktales center around mystical threats coming from seas. Many sea based tales have been transmitted from Ireland and similar tales can be found throughout the Northern seas. There was much cultural transmission from Irish "fishermen, traders, and travelers [who would] cross the North Channel of the Irish sea and carry their own tales along with their wares and catch to Scotland". In many cultures, water is seen as a liminal element, "the threshold between life and death and different sides of spiritual identity." This idea can be seen through the superstition associated with seafaring, that "we find magic where the element of danger is conspicuous". Many Scottish tales pertaining to the sea personify the sea "as a powerful and preternatural hag whose form and force appear to embody the aspects of a stormy sea." Another tale, The Rider of Grianaig, and Iain the Soldier's Son, tells of three daughters of a knight who are captured by a beast, which came from the ocean, and delivered to three giants for marriage. A passage states, "There came a beast from the ocean and she took them with her, and there was no knowledge what way they had taken, nor where they might be sought," highlighting the mysteries and dangers found in the ocean. In Scotland, this relation of danger and the unknown of water and magic is prevalent not just surrounding the seas, but associated with their lochs and rivers as well. There are many creatures associated with the lochs, seas, rivers, and streams of Scotland, including "assorted fairies, glaistigs, dragons, water-bulls, water-horses, kelpies, selkies, blue men, and mermaids".

=== Selkies ===
Selkies are "Supernatural beings who are capable of transformation from human form on the land to seals in the water" and "are often found along a shore, at the edge of the ocean, where human life and marine life meet". Selkie tales in Scotland are found most frequently in the Orkney and Shetlands Islands. Selkies, like mermaids, possess remarkable beauty and transform into humans on land by shedding their seal skin while basking in the sun. Often, a man will locate the selkies sealskin and take it, making the selkie his property, forced to remain with him until she locates her sealskin again. Many selkie stories follow the same plot:

"A selkie meets a mortal who is walking by the edge of the sea. He steals her sealskin. As long as he has the sealskin, she is in his possession. However, she eventually discovers the location of the sealskin and leaves him as soon as she reclaims it."

In these stories, the selkie will always return to the sea, leaving behind either her captor, husband, love, or children, favoring her freedom found in the sea. Core motifs of these stories are transformation, marriage to a seal, human beings descended from seals, "the luring of the human into the selkie world through music, beauty, nakedness, and charm; and the inevitable return of the selkie to the sea". In these tales, the linkage of nature and humanity is prevalent and serves "as everyday reminders of the interconnectedness of all life". These tales also serve as an insight into the power relations between men and women and "the desire for escape from marital bonds has especially poignant implications for women who are caught in abusive relationships and feel powerless to leave them".

=== Water horses ===
Water horses, known as uisge in Gaelic, are a dangerous folktale creature said to be found in freshwater lochs. Harris notes that "almost every lonely freshwater lake was tenanted by one—sometimes several—of these animals… it was said to make its approaches… as a young man, a boy, a ring, and even a tuft of wool… any woman upon whom it set its mark was certain at last to become its victim". In legend, it is often said that humans can control water horses by throwing a "special bridle over them to compel menial service". Unlike the selkies, water horses were not sought after as romantic partners and often used their human forms to hunt women.

=== Kelpies ===
The kelpy resides "in both the rivers of the Highlands and the lakes and streams of the Lowlands." The kelpy can transform into a human, but prefers to take the form of a young horse. It is known to lure humans into the waters it resides in and either drown or devour them. The creatures are also known to cause spontaneous flooding in an attempt to capture someone crossing the river or stream it inhabits.

=== Washer woman ===
The Washer woman, or the Bean Nighidh in Gaelic, is a water nymph resembling a woman with small red, webbed feet, normally clad in a green dress. The Washer woman "is credited, when seen, with foretelling some fatality" and is most notable in the areas of Lewis, Harris, Uist, and Coll. When spotted she is washing the clothes of battle and death shrouds. She is not dangerous and "though hurt follows her appearance, it is not her doing".

== Folklore related to land ==
=== Keener ===
The Keener in Scottish folklore is familiarly known as the Banshee, however the Gaelic language has many similar names for her; Coanteach, Cointeach, Caointeach, or Caointeachan. The literal translation of Banshee means 'fairy woman' but a more accurate definition defines the Keener as "a female spirit attending upon certain families heard 'keening' round the house when some family member is about to die". The most notable difference in this definition is that the Keener is attached to certain families; the MacMillans, Mathisons, Kellys, Mackays, MacAffers, Duffies, Macfarlanes, Shaws, Maclergans, and Curries. Due to the Keener's attachment to these families, she is most commonly seen where these families reside: Arglyeshire, Gigha, Islay, Jura, Tiree, the Long Island, and Skye. There are various descriptions of the Cointeach, but "it is generally described as 'small,' 'a little woman,' 'a very small woman in a short gown and petticoat with a high crowned white cap.'" Descriptions also state that "it resembles a small tuft of wool, and is soft to feel, having neither flesh, blood, or bones". The Cointeach has also been spotted "passing the back door of a house, passing behind the house, [or] the back window" which are particularly unlucky in Scottish tradition. Similarly to her appearance, the sounds heard from her also have various descriptions, including "a mournful wailing, and also as a bitter weeping, the most mournful weeping ever heard. But it is also described as a fearful noise, but also like the splashing of water". She is known to be a warning of death and an omen of the future.

=== Fairies ===
Belief in the fairies, or a fairy kingdom, is prevalent in much of Scottish folklore. Fairies in Scotland are known to be ambivalent, they "may help you or harm you, and you should be careful in your dealings with [them]". They are also commonly called "good neighbors" or "seely wights", which translates to "magical beings". Fairies had many functions, but a Scottish proverb warns "'Na dilute lamh sithiche, do not refuse the hand of a fairy" warning of their ambivalent state, they may help or harm but to refuse them would be dangerous. A common occurrence between humans and fairies is known as a Scottish wit battle in which the conversations between the two is seen as a game. Harris describes these encounters with fairies as a way in which "the metaphysical borderland of life and death hovered perilously close to acts of speech" and that in these encounters "each of the various categories of utterance can be defined in terms of rules specifying their properties and the uses to which they can be put." Fairies are known to be very protective of wildlife, very aggressive, and "capable of exerting an inescapable compulsion upon mortals".

== See also ==
- Cornish mythology
- English folklore
- Matter of Britain
- Welsh folklore
- Welsh mythology
- Scottish mythology
