= Water horse =

Mythical creature

Water Horse
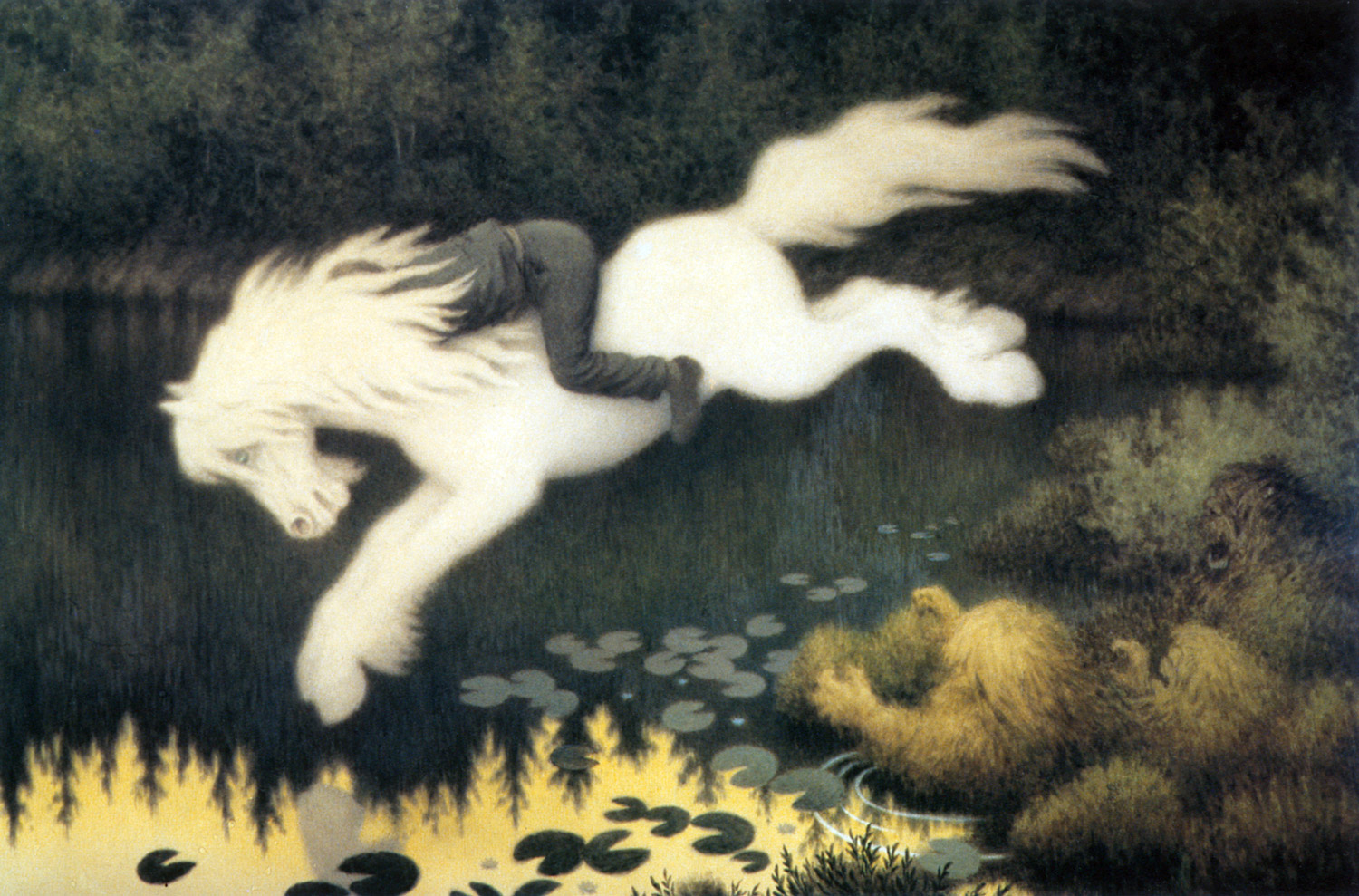
- Portrait of a boy riding a nøkk in the form of a water horse, by Theodor Kittelsen

Creature information
- Other name(s): Kelpie, Waterhorse
- Sub grouping: Lake monster Sea monster Sea serpent Lake serpent

Origin
- First attested: 18th century
- Region: Celtic nations Scandinavia
- Habitat: Water

A water horse (also compounded as: waterhorse) is a mythical creature that appears in multiple forms in Celtic and Nordic folklore. Celtic incarnations includes: the Welsh Ceffyl Dŵr, Irish each uisce, the Scottish each-uisge and kelpie. In Nordic folklore, the water horse is a shape taken on by the nixie, in Swedish called bäckahästen ("the brook horse"), in Faroese and Icelandic nykur ("nixie").

== Etymology ==
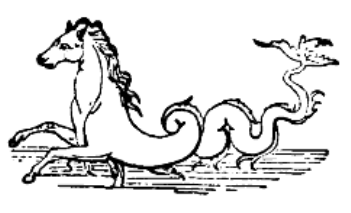
The hippocamp (as seen in this sketch from Pompeii) is a water creature that has been referred to as a water horse.

The term "water horse" was originally a name given to the kelpie, a creature similar to the hippocamp, which has the head, neck and mane of a normal horse, front legs like a horse, webbed feet, and a long, two-lobed, whale-like tail. The term has also been used as a nickname for lake monsters, particularly Ogopogo and Nessie. The name "kelpie" has often been a nickname for many other Scottish lake monsters, such as each uisge and Morag of Loch Morar and Lizzie of Loch Lochy. Other names for these sea monsters include "seahorse" (not referring to the seahorse fish) and "hippocampus" (which is the genus name for seahorses).

The usage of "water horse" or "kelpie" can often be a source of confusion; some consider the two terms to be synonymous, while others distinguish the water horse as a denizen of lochs and the kelpie of turbulent water such as rivers, fords, and waterfalls. Some authors call one creature of a certain place a kelpie while others call it a water horse. The name "water bull" has been used for either creature.

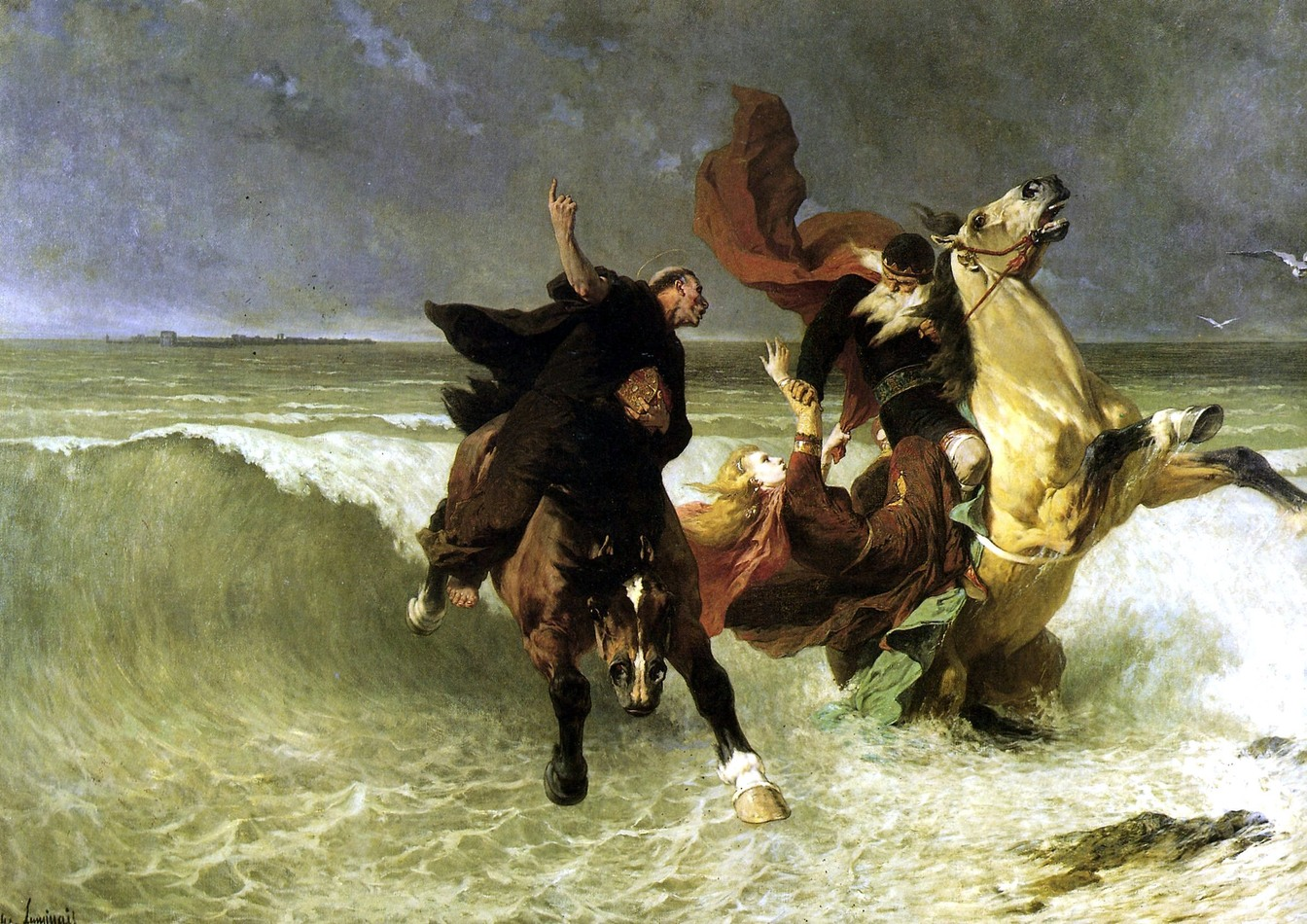
Flight of King Gradlon: Morvarc'h, the magical steed of King Gradlon of Ys.

The Breton King Gradlon's magical "horse of the sea" Morvarc'h (whose name literally means "sea horse" in Breton) was said to have the ability to gallop upon the waves of the sea, in a similar fashion to the water horses of Cornish legend.

== Other lake monsters ==
The water horse has often become a basic description of other lake monsters such as the Nessie and the Lake Champlain monster known as Champ. Loch Morar is reputedly home to "Morag", a lake monster that has been portrayed as a water horse.

== Settings ==
While most Scottish/Celtic folklore places the water horse in a loch (particularly a loch that is famous for a lake monster, such as Loch Ness, Loch Morar or Loch Lomond), some Breton and Cornish tales of water horses place them in the ocean, making them sea monsters.

Most Highland lochs have some kind of water-horse tradition, although a study of 19th-century literature of the time showed that only about sixty lochs and lochans merited a mention out of the thousands of bodies of water in Scotland. The water horse that was reputed to inhabit Loch Ness gained the most mentions in Highland literature.

== Sightings ==
Water horse sightings were reported regularly during the 18th century, but it was not until the 19th century that sightings were recorded.

- In 1846 Captain Christmas of the Danish Navy reported sighting "an enormous, long-necked beast pursuing a school of dolphins" somewhere between Iceland and the Faroe Islands. He described the creature as having a horse-like head and a neck as thick as a man's waist "moving gracefully like a swan's".
- On 6 August 1848 an officer of the Royal Navy corvette HMS Daedalus noticed an unusual looking animal swimming towards the ship. It was said to look similar to a sea serpent with a 1.2-metre-long (4 ft) neck. Its head was about 38 or 41 cm (15 or 16 in) long. It was reported to have no visible fins/flippers or tail, and it had what appeared to be a horsy mane on its neck with seaweed washed over its back.
- In late 1883, two horse-headed beasts, one of them smaller than the other (suggesting or implying a juvenile), were reported off the southern coast of Panama. The crew of the American whaler Hope On reported seeing a 6-metre-long (20 ft) creature submerge. It was brownish coloured with black speckles and four legs/flippers with a tail "that seemed to be divided into two parts" (implying the whale-like tail appearance) and all four limbs and tail were exposed when it reached the surface. A second creature that looked just like it only much smaller tagged along behind it. In the same year, a sighting of a similar looking creature occurred in the Bristol Channel. This creature was reported as leaving behind a greasy slug/snail-like trail.

== See also ==
- List of fictional horses
- Each-uisge
- Hippocampus (mythology)
- Kappa (folklore)
- Neck (water spirit)
- Nuckelavee
- Peg Powler
- Selkie
- Vodyanoi
- Horse symbolism
