= Katharine Mary Briggs =

British folklorist and writer

Katharine Mary Briggs (8 November 1898 – 15 October 1980) was a British folklorist and writer, who wrote The Anatomy of Puck, the four-volume A Dictionary of British Folk-Tales in the English Language, and various other books on fairies and folklore. From 1969 to 1972, she was president of the Folklore Society, which established an award in her name to commemorate her life and work.

== Biography ==
Katharine Briggs was born in Hampstead, London, the eldest of three surviving daughters of Ernest Edward Briggs, who came from Yorkshire (his family had had great success in coal mining in Halifax and Wakefield), and Mary Cooper. The other two sisters were named Winifred and Elspeth. Ernest was a watercolour artist with a specific interest in Scottish scenery who often told his children stories, possibly sparking Katharine's lifelong interest in them. The family moved to Perthshire in 1911, where Ernest built a house, Dalbeathie House. Ernest died there two years later in 1913. Katharine began attending Lady Margaret Hall, Oxford in 1918, obtained a BA in 1922, and took her MA in 1926.

Returning home (because of the family coal legacy, and a colliery in Normanton, she did not need to seek work), she began writing and running plays – the entire family enjoyed theatrical productions, and it was a lifelong interest of Katharine's – while she studied folklore and 17th-century English history. During the Second World War, she was busy teaching in a Polish refugee school and working for the medical branch of the WAAF. After the war, Briggs returned to Oxford and in 1952 was awarded a D.Phil. for her thesis, Some aspects of folk-lore in early seventeenth-century literature.

Briggs went on to become known as a folklorist. After her first book on British fairies, The Personnel of Fairyland, she went on to write many other books on fairies and folklore, including The Anatomy of Puck and its sequel, Pale Hecate's Team (1962), An Encyclopedia of Fairies (1976), as well as a number of children's books such as The Legend of Maiden-Hair (her first published book) and the fantasy novels Hobberdy Dick, and Kate Crackernuts. A Dictionary of British Folk-Tales in the English Language: Part A: Folk Narratives (1970) was re-published in three volumes in 2011 as Folk Tales of Britain, and is described by Philip Pullman in its introduction as the fullest and the most authoritative collection of British folktales that exists.

From 1967 to 1970, Briggs served as president of the Folklore Society., which named an award in her honour. In October 1969, while still serving as president of the Folklore Society, Briggs was awarded the degree of Doctor of Letters (D.Litt.) by the University of Oxford in recognition of her scholarship on supernatural beliefs in seventeenth-century literature.

Briggs lived for much of the latter part of her life at Barn House in Burford in Oxfordshire, In December 1975, Briggs sold Barn House and moved with her library to Southolme in St Margaret's Bay, where she died suddenly on 15 October 1980 aged 81.

== Legacy ==
The Katharine Briggs Folklore Award is an annual book prize established by the Folklore Society to commemorate her life and work and to encourage the study of folklore.

== Published books ==
- Oh Sarah Sarah and Other Nursery Rhymes, with Elspeth Briggs and Winifred Briggs, illustrated by Winifred Briggs (1937)
- The Personnel of Fairyland: A Short Account of the Fairy People of Great Britain for Those Who Tell Stories to Children, illustrated by Jane Moore (1953)
- Hobberdy Dick (1955) – children's novel
- The Anatomy of Puck: An Examination of Fairy Beliefs among Shakespeare's Contemporaries and Successors (1959)
- Pale Hecate's Team: An Examination of the Beliefs on Witchcraft and Magic among Shakespeare's Contemporaries and His Immediate Successors (1962)
- Kate Crackernuts, illus. Jane Kingshill (1963) – children's novel
- Folktales of England, eds. Briggs and Ruth L. Tongue (1965)
- The Fairies in Tradition and Literature (1967); US title The Fairies in English Tradition and Literature
- Dictionary of British Folk-Tales in the English Language (four vols., 1970–71)
- The Folklore of the Cotswolds, illus. Gay John Galsworthy (1974)
- A Dictionary of Fairies: Hobgoblins, Brownies, Bogies, and Other Supernatural Creatures (1976); US title An Encyclopedia of Fairies: [etc]
- A Sampler of British Folk-Tales, compiled (1977); also published as British Folk-Tales and Legends: A Sampler
- The Vanishing People: A Study of Traditional Fairy Beliefs, illus. Mary I. French (1978); US subtitle Fairy Lore and Legends
- Abbey Lubbers, Banshees & Boggarts: A Who's Who of Fairies, illus. Yvonne Gilbert (1979); US subtitle An Illustrated Encyclopedia of Fairies
- Nine Lives: Cats in Folklore, illus. John Ward (1980); US subtitle The Folklore of Cats
