= John Gregorson Campbell =

Scottish minister and folklorist

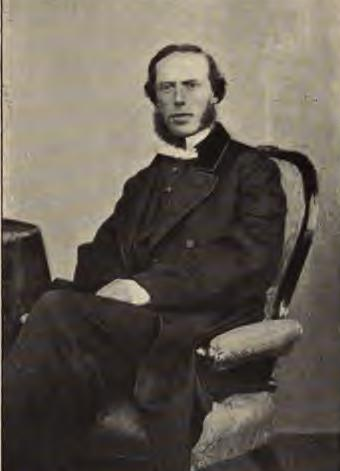
- Born: 1836; Argyll
- Died: November 1891 (aged 54–55)
- Occupation: Minister
- Known for: Folklore collection

John Gregorson Campbell (1836 – 22 November 1891) was a Scottish folklorist and Free Church minister at the Tiree and Coll parishes in Argyll, Scotland. An avid collector of traditional stories, he became Secretary to the Ossianic Society of Glasgow University in the mid-1850s. Ill health had prevented him taking up employment as a Minister when he was initially approved to preach by the Presbytery of Glasgow in 1858 and later after he was appointed to Tiree by the Duke of Argyll in 1861, parishioners objected to his manner of preaching.

Several of the anecdotes he amassed were published in magazines and, just before his death, work began on collating the first of four compendiums of the tales; three were published a few years after his death. He was fluent in several languages, including Scottish Gaelic, and transcribed the legends precisely as dictated by the narrators.

== Early life and education ==
John Gregorson Campbell was born near Loch Linnhe at Kingairloch, Argyll in 1836, the fourth child and second son of Helen MacGregor and Captain John Campbell, an officer for the ship Cygnet. A short memoir, published in 1895 and based on information from Campbell's sister Jessy Wallace, states a Bean Shìth, or fairy washerwoman as Campbell defined it, had cast a spell on his father's ancestors proclaiming "they shall grow like the rush and wither like the fern". The family moved to Appin in about 1839, where the local parochial school provided Campbell's education until he was ten years old. He then attended a higher school in Glasgow before moving on to the University of Glasgow.

== Career ==
Law was the subject Campbell chose to study after completing his education but his primary interest was folklore, a topic that fascinated him from his college days. In the mid-1850s he was appointed Secretary to the Glasgow University Ossianic Society. He secured a licence to preach from the Presbytery of Glasgow in 1858 but was unable to commence work as a clergyman at that time owing to ill health. His recuperation was spent beginning his collection of folklore stories.

When appointed as clergyman at the Free Church united parishes of Tiree and Coll by the Duke of Argyll in early 1861, objections were initially raised by some members of the Tiree congregation who found Campbell's sermons boring, uninspiring and "devoid of fervour". The Presbytery upheld two of the three main complaints, but an appeal was made to the Synod. Concerns had also been expressed that his health was insufficiently robust to serve the needs and challenges of the Tiree parish. The appeal was heard by the General Assembly on 31 May 1861 with Campbell's defence arguing that the main thrust of the complaints was actually founded on the congregation's desire to have their own preferred minister appointed. The motion was not upheld and Campbell became the minister of both parishes, a position he held for thirty years.

== Folklore collections ==
Interest in mythology and folklore gained momentum in the last quarter of the 19th century, probably fuelled by the contentious debates surrounding the authenticity of the Ossian poems published by James Macpherson during the 1760s. Campbell continued to build on the collection he started during his period of recuperation around 1858, preserving the traditional tales as quoted at the time. The folklorist John Francis Campbell (1822–85), also known as Campbell of Islay, had his first mythology books published in 1860 and he corresponded with Campbell. Both men were fluent in several languages, including Scottish Gaelic, and their letters discuss the variations in the folk tales, with Campbell of Islay stating: "I have about 16 versions of one story in Gaelic, and no two have the same name."

Campbell had his own style of collating legends, meticulously transcribing the stories as dictated by the individual storytellers, and only rarely interspersing tales with his own comments. Christian ministers in Scotland differed in their attitudes towards the traditional beliefs and myths perpetuated by their parishioners, and were often dismissive of what they considered to be superstition and paganism, but Campbell persisted in enthusiastically adding to his collection throughout the late 1800s. He was concerned that the intolerance shown by some of his fellow collectors towards the illiterate Gaelic-speaking storytellers and those who believed in the myths would result in the loss of a valuable resource, as he regarded the narrators as having "powers of mind of a highest order".

=== Published work ===
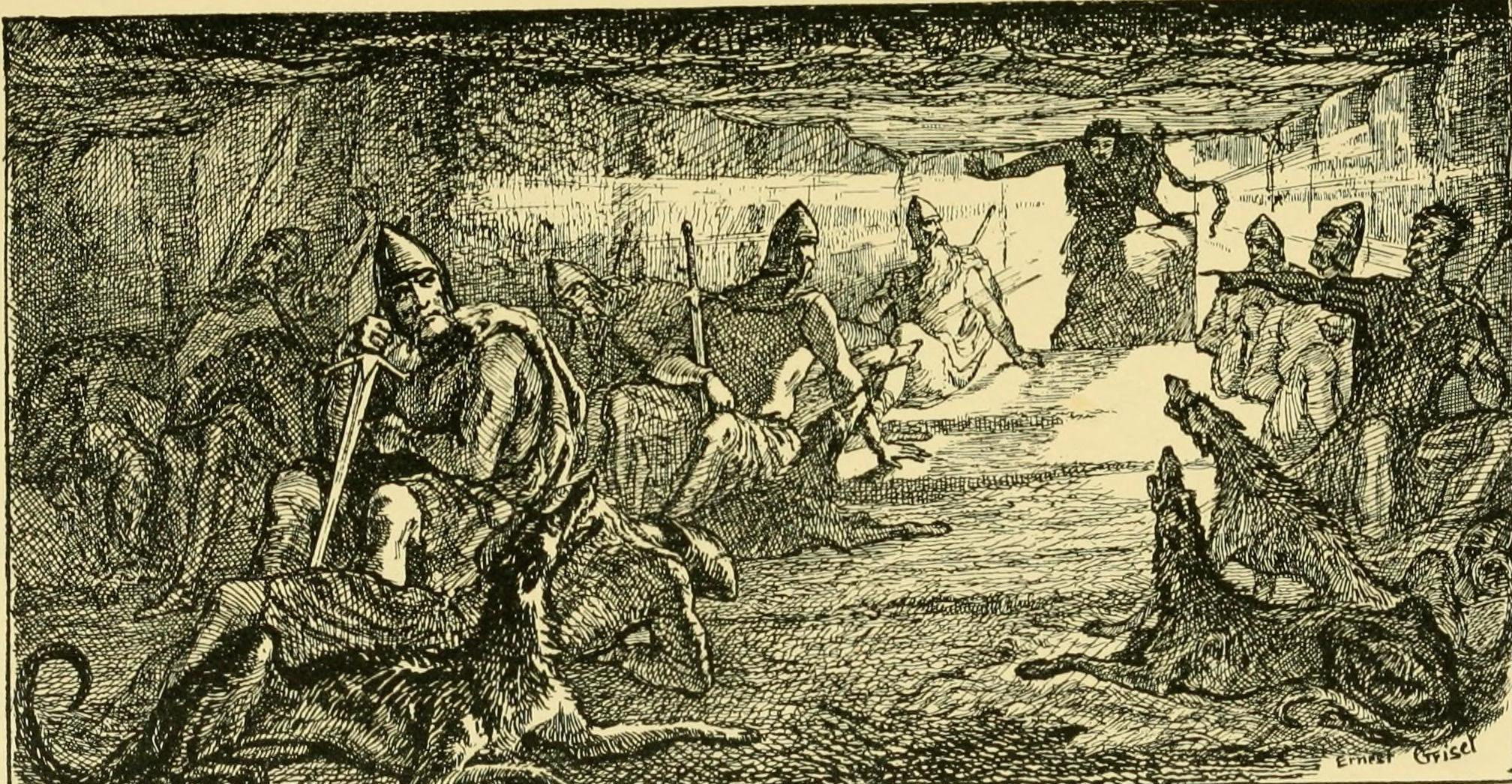
An illustration from Campbell's first published compendium of traditional tales and verses, 1891

Traditional tales collected by Campbell were first published in the inaugural edition of the quarterly periodical the Scottish Celtic Review in March 1881. (Note: Although Nutt lists the periodical title as the Celtic Review, the title page is actually the Scottish Celtic Review) Reproduced in Gaelic and translated on the following pages in English, it was entitled "How the great Tuairisgeul was put to death" and told how the son of the King of Ireland went to a hunting hill and sought the answer to the death of the Great Tuairisgeul. Further legends from his collection were included in the next three volumes of the review. The Gaelic Society of Inverness published some of the tales, also given in Gaelic with an English translation, from 1888 until 1892. The first of these in 1888, "Sir Olave O'Corn", also involved a King of Ireland and included some explanatory notes from Campbell. Celtic Magazine and Highland Monthly were two other journals that published some of his folklore. Some of these were reprinted in the first compendium of Campbell's collection, The Fians, a set of traditional tales and verses about combat printed as part of the Argyllshire series of books in 1891.

== Death and legacy ==
Campbell's health deteriorated in the last years of his life, especially after the death of his mother Helen at the Tiree manse in 1890. His sister Jessy, who lived at the manse, wrote letters and transcribed folk tales on his behalf as he was bed-bound and unable to write. Campbell died on 22 November 1891, before seeing the final printed edition of The Fians. Alfred Nutt, fellow folklorist and publisher, chronicled details of Campbell's life as an introduction to the second compilation of Campbell's collection of myths, Clan Traditions and Popular Tales of the Western Highlands and Islands, published in 1895. Two other books were published posthumously: Superstitions of the Highlands and Islands of Scotland in 1900, and Witchcraft and Second Sight in the West Highlands the following year.

Richard Dorson, American author and director of the Folklore Institute at Indiana University, describes Campbell as worthy of a "front rank among Celtic folklorists" and Sophia Kingshill, author and folklorist, felt his writing was "vivid and engaging". Contemporary praise was not entirely universal; an anonymous review of Superstitions of the Highlands and Islands of Scotland included in The Scottish Antiquary, Or, Northern Notes & Queries (now The Scottish Historical Review) in 1901 described the work as "a book of considerable pretension" and stated it was in need of proofreading, citing several printing errors.
