= Selkie =

Mythological creature

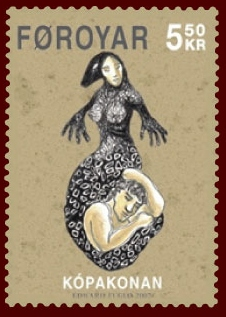
- 2007 Faroese stamp depicting a selkie

Creature information
- Grouping: Mythological
- Similar entities: Mermaid; Huldra; Merman; Siren; Undine

Origin
- Habitat: water, ocean

Selkies are mythological creatures that can shapeshift between seal and human forms by removing or putting on their seal skin. They feature prominently in the oral traditions and mythology of various cultures, especially those of Celtic and Norse origin. The term "selkie" derives from the Scots word for "seal", and is also spelled as silkies, sylkies, or selchies. Selkies are sometimes referred to as selkie folk (Scots: selkie fowk), meaning "seal folk". (Note: selkie simply means "seal" in Scots. Bruford (1974), p. 78, note 1. Bruford (1997), p. 120.) Selkies are mainly associated with the Northern Isles of Scotland, where they are said to live as seals in the sea but shed their skin to become human on land.

Selkies have a dual nature: they can be friendly and helpful to humans, but they can also be dangerous and vengeful. Selkies are often depicted as attractive and seductive in human form, and many stories involve selkies having romantic or sexual relationships with humans, sometimes resulting in children. Selkies can also be coerced or tricked into marrying humans, usually by someone who steals and hides their seal skin, preventing them from returning to the sea. Such marriages are often unhappy, as the selkie always longs for the sea and may eventually escape if they find their skin.

Selkies have counterparts in other cultures. They are sometimes confused with other seal-like creatures, such as the mermaids or the finfolk. Selkies have inspired many works of art, literature, music, and film.

== Terminology ==
The Scots language word selkie is diminutive for selch which strictly speaking means 'grey seal' (Halichoerus grypus). Alternate spellings for the diminutive include: selky, seilkie, sejlki, silkie, silkey, saelkie, and sylkie.

The term selkie according to Alan Bruford should be treated as meaning any seal with or without the implication of transformation into human form.

W. Traill Dennison insisted selkie was the correct term to be applied to these shapeshifters, to be distinguished from the merfolk, and that Samuel Hibbert committed an error in referring to them as mermen and mermaids. However, when other Norse cultures are examined, Icelandic writers also refer to the seal-wives as merfolk (marmennlar).

There also seems to be some conflation between the selkie and finfolk. This confounding only existed in Shetland, claimed Dennison, and that in Orkney the selkie are distinguished from the finfolk, and the selkies' abode undersea is not "Finfolk-a-heem"; this notion, although seconded by Ernest Marwick, has been challenged by Bruford.

There is further confusion with the Norse concept of the Finns as shapeshifters, Finns (synonymous with finfolk) being the Shetland dialect name for dwellers of the sea who could remove their seal-skin and transform into humans according to one native correspondent. (Note: George Sinclair Jr., an informant for Karl Blind. This intelligence about the "Finns" was also repeated by Francis James Child in his annotation to ballad 113, "The Great Silkie of Sule Skerry".)

Gaelic terms

In Gaelic stories, specific terms for selkies are rarely used. They are seldom differentiated from mermaids. They are most commonly referred to as maighdeann-mhara in Scottish Gaelic, maighdean mhara in Irish, and moidyn varrey in Manx ('maiden of the sea' i.e. mermaids) and clearly have the seal-like attributes of selkies. The only term that specifically refers to a selkie but which is only rarely encountered is maighdeann-ròin, or 'seal maiden'.

== Scottish legend ==
Many of the folk-tales on selkie folk have been collected from the Northern Isles (Orkney and Shetland).

In Orkney lore, selkie is said to denote various seals of greater size than the grey seal; only these large seals are credited with the ability to shapeshift into humans, and are called "selkie folk". The type of large seals that might have been seen on the islands include the Greenland seal (also known as the Harp Seal) and the crested seal (also known as the hooded seal). Something similar is stated in Shetland tradition, that the mermen and mermaids prefer to assume the shape of larger seals, referred to as Haaf-fish.

=== Selkie wife and human lover ===
A typical folk-tale is that of a man who steals a female selkie's skin, finds her naked on the sea shore, and compels her to become his wife. But the wife will spend her time in captivity longing for the sea, her true home, and will often be seen gazing longingly at the ocean. She may bear several children by her human husband, but once she discovers her skin, she will immediately return to the sea and abandon the children she loved. Sometimes, one of her children discovers or knows the whereabouts of the skin. (Note: The child with a sore on her feet reveals it to be in the aisins (space beneath the eaves) in the Orkney version from North Ronaldsay, the mother told the child she was looking for the skin for her, so she could make a rivlin (shoe) to heal her sore.) (Note: The children found the skin under a sheaf of corn (wheat or other grain) in the tale about the man of Unst, Shetland.) Sometimes it is revealed she already had a first husband of her own kind. (Note: Orcadian versions: Dennison (tale from North Ronaldsay); Capt. Clark Kennedy (1884, tale from Stromness skipper)) Although in some children's story versions, the selkie revisits her family on land once a year, in the typical folktale she is never seen again by them. In one version, the selkie wife was never seen again (at least in human form) by the family, but the children would witness a large seal approach them and "greet" them plaintively.

Male selkies are described as being very handsome in their human form, and having great seductive powers over human women. They typically seek those who are dissatisfied with their lives, such as married women waiting for their fishermen husbands. In one popular tattletale version about a certain "Ursilla" of Orkney (a pseudonym), it was rumoured that when she wished to make contact with her male selkie she would shed seven tears into the sea. In one Scots ballad, The Great Silkie of Sule Skerry, the male selkie returns after years of her raising their child, he then takes the child to be raised as a seal and gives her gold as a fee.

Children born between human and seal-folk may have webbed hands, as in the case of the Shetland mermaid whose children had "a sort of web between their fingers", or "Ursilla" rumoured to have children sired by a male selkie, such that the children had to have the webbing between their fingers and toes made of horny material clipped away occasionally. Some of the descendants actually did have these hereditary traits, according to Walter Traill Dennison, who was related to the family.

=== Binding rules and sinful origin ===
Some legends say that selkies could turn human every so often when the conditions of the tides were correct, but oral storytellers disagreed as to the time interval. In Ursilla's rumour, the contacted male selkie promised to visit her at the "seventh stream" or springtide. In the ballad The Great Silkie of Sule Skerry, the seal-husband promised to return in seven years; the number "seven" being commonplace in balladry.

According to one version, the selkie could only assume human form once every seven years because they are bodies that house condemned souls. There is the notion that they are either humans who had committed sinful wrongdoing, or fallen angels.

=== Superstitions ===
It was only during hard times that the people of the Scottish Isles would kill seals to make use of their skin and blubber. It was thought that the killing of a seal would result in misfortune for the perpetrator.

Ernest Marwick recounts the tale of crofters who brought their sheep to graze upon a small group of holms within the Orkney Islands. During the summer, a man placed seven sheep on the largest holm. While on his way home from grazing sheep, the man killed a seal. That night, all of the man's sheep disappeared, however, the other crofters, who had not killed a seal, did not lose their sheep.

== Orkney tales ==
The selkie-wife tale had its version for practically every island of Orkney according to W. Traill Dennison. In his study, he included a version collected from a resident of North Ronaldsay, in which a "goodman of Wastness", a confirmed bachelor, falls in love with a damsel among the selkie-folk, whose skin he captures. She searches the house in his absence, and finds her seal-skin thanks to her youngest daughter who had once seen it being hidden under the roof.

In "Selkie Wife", a version from Deerness on the Mainland, Orkney, the husband locked away the seal-skin in a sea-kist (chest) and hid the key, but the seal woman is said to have adhered willingly to the concealment, saying it was "better tae keep her selkie days oot o' her mind". However, when she discovered her skin, she departed hastily leaving her clothes all scattered about.

A fisherman named Alick supposedly gained a wife by stealing the seal-skin of a selkie, in a tale told by an Orkney skipper. The Alick in the tale is given as a good acquaintance of the father of the storyteller, John Heddle of Stromness.

== Shetland tales ==
A version of the tale about the selkie compelled to become wife to a human who steals her seal-skin, localized in Unst, was published by Samuel Hibbert in 1822. She already had a husband of her own kind in her case.

Some stories from Shetland have selkies luring islanders into the sea at midsummer, the lovelorn humans never returning to dry land.

In Shetland, the sea-folk were believed to revert to human shape and breathed air in the atmosphere in the submarine homeland, but with their sea-dress (seal-skin) they had the ability to transform into seals to make transit from there to the reefs above the sea. However, each skin was unique and irreplaceable.

The shape-shifting nature of selkies within Shetland tradition is detailed in the Scottish ballad The Great Silkie of Sule Skerry:

I am a man upo' da land;
I am a selkie i' da sea.
An' whin I'm far fa every strand,
My dwelling is in Shöol Skerry.

There is also a story in which a woman gives birth to an unusual child after having met a selkie.

In the tale of "Gioga's Son", a group of seals resting in the Ve Skerries were ambushed and skinned by Papa Stour fishermen, but as these were actually seal-folk, the spilling of the blood caused a surge in seawater, and one fisherman was left abandoned. The seal-folk victims recovered in human-like form, but lamented the loss of their skin without which they could not return to their submarine home. Ollavitinus was particularly distressed since he was now separated from his wife; however, his mother Gioga struck a bargain with the abandoned seaman, offering to carrying him back to Papa Stour on condition the skin would be returned. In a different telling of the same plot line, the stranded man is called Herman Perk, while the rescuing selkie's name is unidentified.

== Parallels ==
Tales of the seal bride type has been assigned the number ML 4080 under Reidar Thoralf Christiansen's system of classification of migratory folktales. These stories of selkie-wives are also recognized to be of the swan maiden motif type. There are now hundreds of seal bride type tales that have been found from Ireland to Iceland. Only one specimen was found in Norway by Christiansen.

In the Faroe Islands there are analogous beliefs in seal-folk and seal-women also.

Seal shapeshifters similar to the selkie exist in the folklore of many cultures. A corresponding creature existed in Swedish legend, and the Chinook people of North America have a similar tale of a boy who changes into a seal.

=== Icelandic folk-tales ===
The folk-tale "Selshamurinn" ("The Seal-Skin") published by Jón Árnason offers an Icelandic analogue of the selkie folk tale. The tale relates how a man from Mýrdalur forced a woman transformed from a seal to marry him after taking possession of her seal-skin. She discovers the key to the chest in her husband's usual clothes when he dresses up for a Christmas outing, and the seal woman is reunited with the male seal who was her betrothed partner.

Another such tale was recorded by Jón Guðmundsson the Learned (in 1641), and according to him these seal folk were sea-dwelling elves called marmennlar (mermen and mermaids). His tale is of a man who comes across elves dancing and celebrating within a cave by the ocean. The cave is lined with the sealskins of the dancing elves. As soon as the elves take notice of the man, they rush to don their skins and dive back into the ocean. However, the man is able to steal the smallest of the skins, sliding it underneath his clothes. The owner of the skin tries to retrieve her skin from the man but he quickly takes hold of the young elf and takes her to his home to be his wife. The man and the elf are together for two years, producing two children, a boy and a girl, but the elf harbors no love for the man. During this time, the former elf woman's elf husband swims along the shore by the couple's home. One day, the elf woman finds her skin, and runs away, never to be seen again.

Scientist Fridtjof Nansen reported another Icelandic tale of the seal-woman: a man passes by the sea and hears sounds coming out of a cave. He finds a pile of discarded sealskins nearby and fetches one of them. Later that same day, he returns to the cave and finds a weeping young woman – the owner of the sealskin he took home. The man brings the woman to his house; they marry and have children. One day, while the man is away fishing, the woman finds her sealskin, says goodbye to her human family and departs to the sea.

A more distant echo of selkie-type stories may be found in the medieval story of the demonic woman Selkolla (whose name means 'Seal-head').

=== Faroese legends ===
A famous selkie story from the Faroe Islands is The Legend of Kópakonan, where kópakonan literally meaning 'the seal woman.' The story tells of a young farmer from the village of Mikladalur who, after learning about the local legend that seals could come ashore and shed their skins once a year on the Thirteenth Night, goes to see for himself. While laying in wait, the man watches as many seals swim to shore, shedding their skin to reveal their human forms. The farmer takes the skin of a young selkie woman, who, unable to return to the water without her skin, is forced to follow the young man back to his farm and become his wife. The two stay together for many years, even producing several children. The man locks the selkie woman's skin in a chest, keeping the key to the lock on his person at all times, so his wife may never gain access. However, one day the man forgets his key at home, and comes back to his farm to find that his selkie wife has taken her skin and returned to the ocean. Later, when the farmer is out on a hunt, he kills the selkie woman's selkie husband and two selkie sons. Enraged, the selkie woman promises vengeance for her lost kin. She exclaims that "some shall be drowned, some shall fall from cliffs and slopes, and this shall continue, until so many men have been lost that they will be able to link arms around the whole island of Kalsoy." Deaths that occur on the island are thought to be due to the selkie woman's curse.

Peter Kagan and the Wind by Gordon Bok tells of the fisherman Kagan who married a seal-woman. Against his wife's wishes he set sail dangerously late in the year, and was trapped battling a terrible storm, unable to return home. His wife shifted to her seal form and swam out to comfort him in his boat as they froze, even though this meant she could never return to her human body and hence her happy home. Singer-songwriter Russell Christian immortalized the tale of the Faroese selkie in his song "Kopakonan".

=== Irish folklore ===
The mermaid in Irish folklore (sometimes called merrow in Hiberno-English) has been regarded as a seal-woman in some instances. In a certain collection of lore in County Kerry, there is an onomastic tale in Tralee that claimed the Lee family was descended from a man who took a murdúch ('mermaid') for a wife; she later escaped and joined her seal-husband, suggesting she was of the seal-folk kind.

There is also the tradition that the Conneely clan of Connemara was descended from seals, and it was taboo for them to kill the animals lest it bring ill luck. And since conneely became a moniker of the animal, many changed their surname to Connolly. It is also mentioned in this connection that there is a Roaninish (Rón-inis, 'seal island') just outside Gweebarra Bay, off the western coastline of County Donegal in Ulster.

== Selkie children ==
In many versions of the selkie myth, the children produced by the coupling of a selkie and a human, are born with certain physical characteristics that set them apart from normal children.

In David Thomson's book The People of the Sea, which chronicles the extensive legends surrounding the Grey Seal within the folklore of rural Scottish and Irish communities, it is the children of male selkies and human women that have webbed toes and fingers. When the webbing is cut, a rough and rigid growth takes its place.

In The Folklore of Orkney and Shetland, Ernest Marwick cites a tale of a woman who gives birth to a son with a seal's face after falling in love with a selkie man. A dream later reveals the location of silver for the woman to find after giving birth to her son.

A group of selkie descendants, also mentioned by Marwick, possessed a skin that was greenish, white in color and cracked in certain places upon the body. These cracks exuded a fishy odor.

== Theories of origins ==
Before the advent of modern medicine, many physiological conditions were untreatable. When children were born with abnormalities, it was common to blame the fairies. The MacCodrum clan of the Outer Hebrides became known as the "MacCodrums of the seals" as they claimed to be descended from a union between a fisherman and a selkie. This was an explanation for their syndactyly – a hereditary growth of skin between their fingers that made their hands resemble flippers.

Scottish folklorist and antiquarian, David MacRitchie believed that early settlers in Scotland probably encountered, and even married, Finnish and Sami women who were misidentified as selkies because of their sealskin kayaks and clothing. Others have suggested that the traditions concerning the selkies may have been due to misinterpreted sightings of Finn-men (Inuit from the Davis Strait). The Inuit wore clothes and used kayaks that were both made of animal skins. Both the clothes and kayaks would lose buoyancy when saturated and would need to be dried out. It is thought that sightings of Inuit divesting themselves of their clothing or lying next to the skins on the rocks could have led to the belief in their ability to change from a seal to a man.

Another belief is that shipwrecked Spaniards were washed ashore, and their jet-black hair resembled seals. As the anthropologist A. Asbjørn Jøn has recognised, though, there is a strong body of lore that indicates that selkies "are said to be supernaturally formed from the souls of drowned people".

== Modern treatments ==
Scottish poet George Mackay Brown wrote a modern prose version of the story, entitled "Sealskin".

== In popular culture ==
Selkies—or references to them—have appeared in numerous novels, songs and films, though the extent to which these reflect traditional stories varies greatly. Work where selkie lore forms the central theme include:

- Janis Mackay has written several selkie based books including her 2025 novel On a Northern Shore.
- A Stranger Came Ashore, a 1975 young adult novel by Scottish author Mollie Hunter. Set in the Shetland Islands in the north of Scotland, the plot revolves around a boy who must protect his sister from the Great Selkie.
- The Secret of Roan Inish, a 1994 American/Irish independent film based on the novel Secret of the Ron Mor Skerry, by Rosalie K. Fry. The film's story follows a young Irish girl, Fiona Coneely, who uncovers the mystery of her family's selkie ancestry, and its connection to her lost brother.
- Selkie, a 2000 Australian made-for-TV film.
- Ondine, a 2009 Irish film in which a woman caught in a fishing net is believed to be a selkie.
- Song of the Sea, a 2014 Irish animated film about a young boy who discovers his mute sister is a selkie who must find her voice and free the faerie creatures from the Celtic goddess Macha.
- Mara: The Seal Wife, a 2021 Scottish medium length film inspired by Selkie folklore set in the Outer Hebrides of Scotland.
- In the 2023 American animated children's series, Curses!, the episode "A Celtic Cloak" features a selkie as a central character.
- A Highland Song, the indie 2023 video game, features Selkies as folk creatures who are shown to appear in both seal and human form and have complex relationships, both with each other and humans.
- Song of the Selkie, the 2024 short film, features a Selkie as the central character, delving into Scottish and Faroese folklore.
- In season 2 of Lost GirlLost Girl, a group of dancers at a strip club were discovered to be Selkies who were trying to steal their pelts back from the club owner.
- The plot of the fifth Bad Machinery storyline, "The Case of the Fire Inside", revolves around Selkies.
- Secrets at Red Rocks, a 2025 TV series from New Zealand combining Celtic and Maori Selkie mythology.
- A Sweet Sting Of Salt, a 2024 novel by Rose Sutherland, a re-imagining of the selkie-wife folktale set in Nova Scotia in which a spinster midwife suspects a strange woman's marriage to a reclusive fisherman may not be all it seems.
- The Sirens, a 2025 novel by Emilia Hart, a historical novel with elements of magical realism that features Irish merrows and selkie/merrow children.
- The Girl from the Sea, a 2021 young adult romance graphic novel by Lee Knox Ostertag, in which a teenage girl is saved from drowning by a young selkie and the two fall in love while also navigating the complications of relationships with family and friends.
- The Ice Moves for No One, Book 1 of the Duskingr Saga, a 2025 adult queer fantasy novel by Arlo Z. Graves reimagines selkies as warriors and follows the story of selkie Aalgur Thalon on her journey with chronic illness and disability. The second book in the trilogy, Yesterday Will Not be Silenced, will introduce a river otter 'selkie' inspired by Dobhar-chú folklore.
- The song "Broken Mast Bay" from musician Sail North features the story of an unnamed sailor who takes a boat out on the waters of the titular water feature while drunk. He rows out to "the Mists of Nore" where he hears beautiful singing, which turns out to be from a selkie. The sailor spends the night with her, and receives from her a pearl pendant by which to remember her. He locks the pendant away in a chest and forgets about it until he meets her in a village square years later.

== See also ==
- Bucca (mythological creature)
- Finfolk
- Kelpie
- Mermaid
- Merman
- Swan maidens
