= Nuckelavee =

Horse-like demon from Orcadian mythology

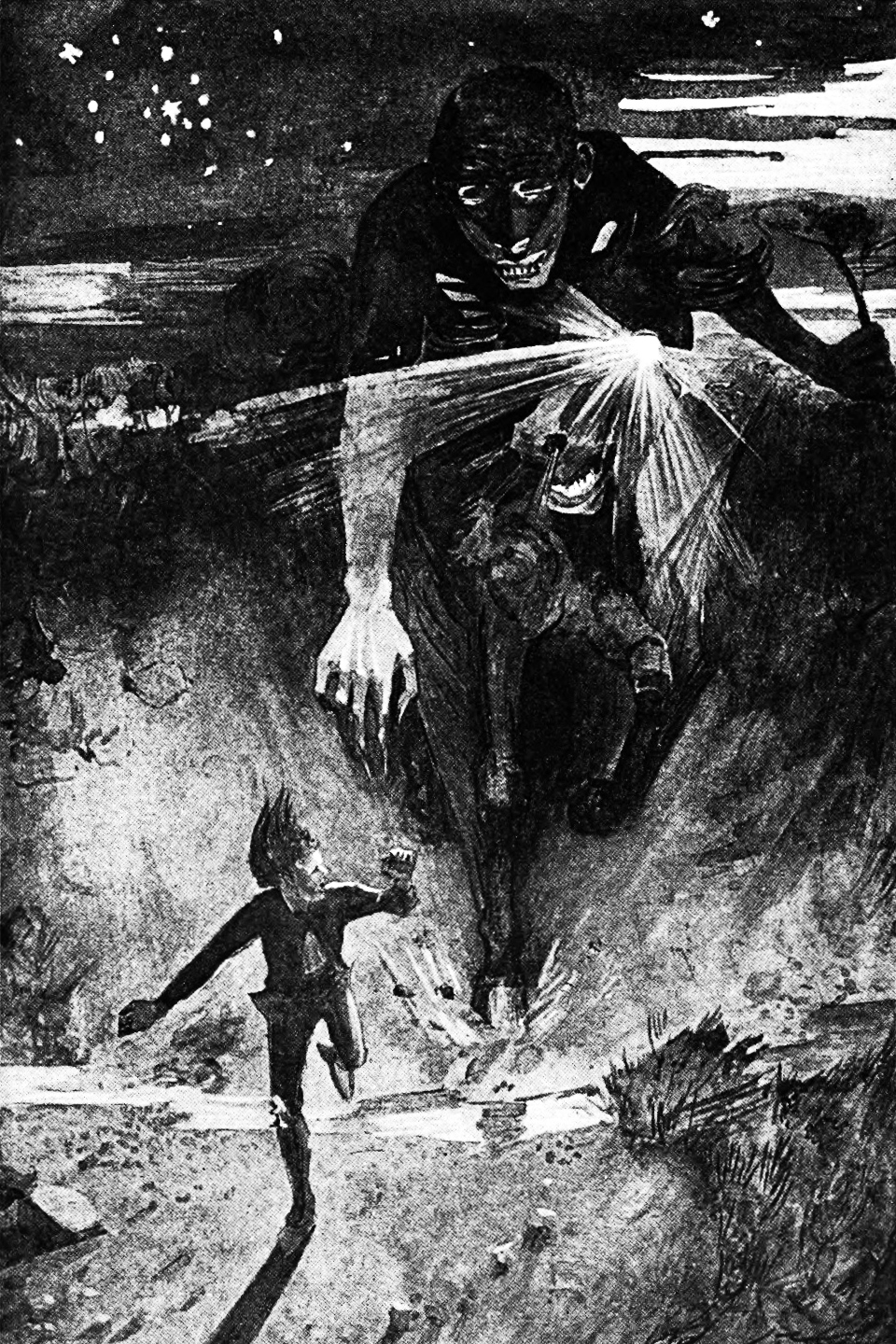
The nuckelavee chasing an islander, painting by James Torrance (1859–1916).

The nuckelavee ( /nʌklɑːˈviː/) or nuckalavee is a horse-like demon from Orcadian folklore that combines equine and human elements. If one was looking casually, or under the cover of shadow in the night, it was thought to have the silhouette of a normal horseman. However, upon further inspection, it resembles a fleshless horse which sports one eye and fins on its legs, with a fleshless human head, torso, and arms longer than normal sprouting out the horse's back.

British folklorist Katharine Briggs called it "the nastiest" of all the demons of Scotland's Northern Isles. The nuckelavee's breath was thought to wilt crops and sicken livestock and the creature was held responsible for droughts and epidemics on land despite being predominantly a sea-dweller.

A graphic description of the nuckelavee as it appears on land was given by an islander who claimed to have had a confrontation with it, but accounts describing the details of the creature's appearance are inconsistent. In common with many other sea monsters, it is unable to tolerate fresh water. Therefore, those it is pursuing have only to cross a river or stream to be rid of it. The nuckelavee is kept in confinement during the summer months by the Mither o' the Sea, an ancient Orcadian spirit, and the only one able to control it.

Orcadian folklore had a strong Scandinavian influence, and it may be that the nuckelavee is a composite of a water horse from Celtic mythology and a creature imported by the Norsemen. As with similar malevolent entities such as the kelpie, it possibly offered an explanation for incidents that islanders in ancient times could not otherwise understand.

== Etymology ==
The late 19th century saw an upsurge of interest on transcribing folklore, but the recorders used inconsistent spelling and frequently anglicised words, thus the same entity could be given different names. The term nuckelavee derives from Orcadian knoggelvi, and according to Orkney resident and 19th-century folklorist Walter Traill Dennison means "Devil of the Sea". The same demon is called a mukkelevi in Shetland, where it was considered a nasty sea-trow or sea-devil.

Samuel Hibbert, an antiquarian of the early nineteenth century, considered the component nuck of the nuckelavee's name to be cognate with both the Nick in Old Nick, a name sometimes given to the Devil of Christian belief, and with the Latin necare, to kill.

== Folk beliefs ==
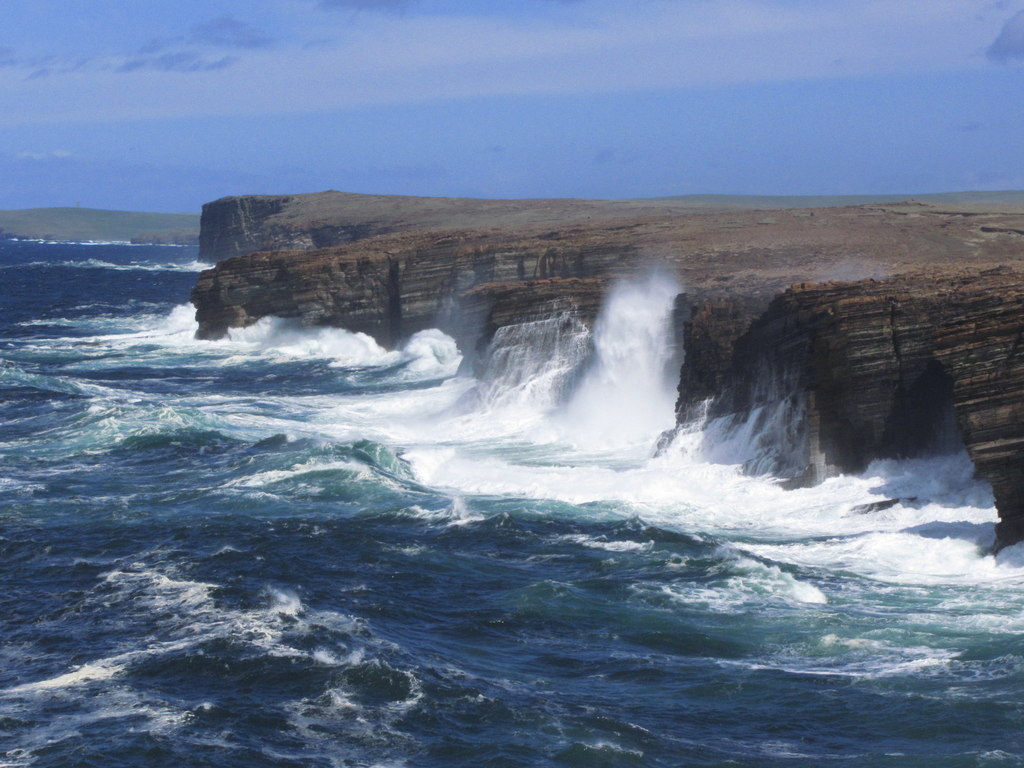
The tempestuous seas of Orkney are home to the nuckelavee.

=== Description and common attributes ===
Stories of mythical Orcadian demons are recorded in the 16th-century Latin manuscripts of Jo Ben, (Note: It is uncertain why Jo Ben compiled the manuscript Descriptions of Orkney, which provides a sequential account of the Orkney Islands recording details of traditions and development. Various suggestions have been made as to his identity: Scran states he was John Ballender and had been sent to carry out a survey of the islands; historical geographer Charles W. J. Withers suggests he was John Benston or Beinston, an Orkney bishop's clerk; and local historian Sigurd Towrie indicates he may have been John Bellenden or Ballendon, attributing the manuscript to be "the oldest surviving account of the Orkney Islands, after they transferred to Scotland in 1468".) who may have been referring to the nuckelavee in his description of the Orkney island of Stronsay. Dennison transcribed much of the information available about traditional tales told on Orkney, but to an extent romanticised and systematically altered certain elements of the stories in the process of transforming them into prose. (Note: Specific dates are not given for exactly when Traill Dennison gathered the tales but his various transcripts were published between 1880 and 1894.)

The nuckelavee is a mythical sea-creature that appears as a horse-like demon when it ventures onto land. Writer and folklorist Ernest Marwick considered it very similar to the Norwegian nøkk, the nuggle of Shetland and the kelpie. A unique and solitary creature possessing extensive evil powers, its malevolent behaviour can influence events throughout the islands. Islanders were terrified of the monster and would not speak its name without immediately saying a prayer. It was often found in the vicinity of a beach, but would never come ashore if it was raining.

No tales describe what form the nuckelavee takes when in the sea, but its appearance on land has been recounted in graphic detail. An islander, Tammas, claimed to have survived a confrontation with the beast and, after much cajoling from Dennison, reluctantly gave his description of the monster, the only known first-hand account. (Note: As alluded to by Traill Dennison, to whom the story was told, Tammas's account bears a certain resemblance to the events in Robert Burns's poem Tam o' Shanter (1790).) According to Tammas, the nuckelavee has a man's torso attached to a horse's back as if it were a rider. The male torso has no legs, but its arms can reach the ground from its position on top of the equine body, the legs of which have fin-like appendages. The torso has a large head – possibly as much as 3 feet (90 centimetres) in diameter – that rolls back and forth. The monster described by Tammas has two heads; the equine head has an enormous gaping mouth that exudes a pungent, toxic vapour, and a single giant eye like a burning red flame. A particularly gruesome detail is that the nuckelavee has no skin; black blood courses through yellow veins, and the pale sinews and powerful muscles are visible as a pulsating mass. Other reports state that the creature resembles a centaur; narratives are inconsistent in the finer details of the demon's description however. Traill Dennison only describes a man's head with a "mouth projected like that of a pig". Marwick also only mentions one head with a single red eye, and he borrows some of Tammas's characterisation by recording the creature's mouth as "like a whale's".

The nuckelavee's breath was thought to wilt crops and sicken livestock, and it was considered responsible for epidemics and drought. Seaweed burning to create what was known at the time as kelp began on Stronsay in 1722. The product – soda ash – was an alkali mainly used to treat acidic soil, although as time went on its commercial importance in soap and glass manufacture increased. The pungent smoke emitted during the process was believed to enrage the nuckelavee, resulting in a wild rampage of plague, the deaths of cattle and the destruction of crops. The nuckelavee was said to have infected horses on Stronsay with the deadly disease known as mortasheen, (Note: This is now commonly known as glanders.) to demonstrate its fury and exact its revenge against the islanders for burning seaweed; the infection subsequently spread to all the other islands involved in the industry. The creature was also blamed for prolonged periods of abnormally low rainfall, leading to water shortages and poor harvests.

== Confinement ==
The nuckelavee is the most malevolent of the demons in and around the Scottish islands, without any redeeming characteristics. The only entity able to control it is the Mither o' the Sea, an ancient spirit in Orcadian mythology who keeps the nuckelavee confined during the summer months. In common with other mythical sea-monsters, with the possible exception of kelpies and the nuggle of Shetland, it is unable to wade through fresh flowing water, therefore it can be escaped by crossing a stream. Tammas managed to escape from the nuckelavee after he inadvertently splashed it with water from the loch he was alongside; this briefly distracted the monster, allowing Tammas to run over to a nearby channel of fresh water and jump to safety on the opposite bank.

== Origins ==
Malevolent creatures possibly served to provide explanations for incidents that islanders were otherwise unable to account for; many ancient myths were based upon the natural elements of the turbulent and ever changing sea around Orkney. Established Orcadian tales were strongly influenced by Scandinavian mythology with a blending of traditional Celtic stories, so the nuckelavee may have its roots in a mythical creature imported by the Norsemen fused with a traditional Celtic water horse.

== See also ==
- List of fictional horses
- Water horse
- Hippocampus (mythology)
- Kappa (folklore)
- Neck (water spirit)
- Peg Powler
- Selkie
- Vodyanoi
