= Nuggle =

Mythical horse from Shetland folklore

A nuggle, njuggle, or neugle, is a mythical water horse of primarily Shetland folklore where it is also referred to as a shoepultie or shoopiltee on some parts of the islands. A nocturnal creature that is always of a male gender, there are occasional fleeting mentions of him connected with the Orkney islands but he is more frequently associated with the rivers, streams and lochs of Shetland. He is easily recognised by his distinctive wheel-like tail and, unlike his evil counterparts the each-uisge or the nuckelavee, has a fairly gentle disposition being more prone to playing pranks and making mischief rather than having malicious intents.

== Etymology ==
Norsemen, predominantly from the west coast of Norway, began to settle in Shetland around the beginning of the 9th century; Norn, the primary language spoken by islanders from then until the late 17th century – or as late as the mid-18th century – was heavily influenced by the settlers and, like the folklore of the islands, blended Norse and Scottish characteristics. The Norsemen's impact on the folklore of the Orkney and Shetland islands was to a much higher degree than that fused through the lore of the Highlands.

The Scottish National Dictionary attributes neugle and its variant spellings – ni(o)gle, nyogle, nyugl etc. – as coming from the Old English nicor, the Old Norse nykr, the Middle Low German or the Middle Dutch water demon, necker. The same publication gives shoopiltee and its spelling variations as adaptations of the Old Norse sjó and piltr meaning sea added to boy or lad.

In An Etymological Glossary of the Shetland and Orkney Dialect Thomas Edmondston lists the creature as a niogle crediting a Gothic derivation from gner for horse and el for water; he also records shoupiltin but merely catalogues it as a triton from Shetland.

== Folk beliefs ==
=== Description and common attributes ===
Nuggles were water spirits that inhabited the rivers, streams and small lochs of the Shetland islands; they were known as the shoopiltee or the shoepultie in some areas of Shetland particularly in the northernmost islands. Karl Blind, a 19th-century folklorist who regularly wrote about the lore of Shetland, asserts that after extensive enquiries he had only ever heard of the nuggle being in Shetland; there may however be tentative references to it around the lochs and watercourses of Hoy and at Muckle Water on Rousay which are both part of the Orkney archipelago. Tales of nuggles were never recorded on the islands of Yell and Fetlar, parts of the Shetland archipelago. The creatures were also found beside watermills and never strayed very far from water. The entity was capable of assuming many disguises but generally favoured the form of an attractive horse; he never assumed a human form. Nuggles were always male water horses or ponies and were never portrayed as mares. His overall proportions were like those of a generously fed and well-conditioned Shetland pony or horse. The colour of his sleek coat ranged from a deep bluish-grey through to a very light, almost white, grey.

Similar equine type creatures are: the evil Each-uisge from the Gaelic folklore of the Scottish Highlands; the Tangies that haunt the coastline and sea shores but reside in the ocean depths; and the Norwegian nøkk. Folklorist Ernest Marwick considers the demonic Nuckelavee, which features in Orcadian folk tales, to also be a relative of the nuggle. Among the characteristics distinguishing the nuggle from his counterparts was his tail which resembled a wheel. The trademark tail made him easily recognisable despite his attempts to hide it between his hind legs so he tended to stay out of sight except at night or just as the sun set in the twilight hours. Additionally, unlike other corresponding creatures, he was of a gentle disposition, more likely to instil fear rather than attacking islanders although some tales suggest otherwise; according to the author and folklorist Jessie Saxby "he was a more feeble sort". He liked playing practical jokes and making mischief but was deceitful and not very brave. Spitefulness was not a part of his character and his pranks were tempered with a degree of mercy.

Only magical beings called Finns (Note: Finns in Shetland lore were distinct from the Finfolk of Orkney described by Walter Traill Dennison; Finns later coalesced with supernatural marine entities, as which they are better known.) were able to ride a nuggle without coming to any harm. If the nuggle had successfully tricked an unsuspecting passer-by into mounting him, usually by pretending to be tame and standing tranquilly at the side of a path, he would immediately make for the nearest deep water.

== Origins ==
Jessie Saxby suggests fear of the nuggle prevented children venturing too close to deep water or watermills and that parents embellished the tale by adding the creature was capable of producing a pleasant tune providing a child stood well away from the water. John Spence, a resident of Lerwick and author of the 1899 publication Shetland Folk-lore, agrees many of the legendary tales of spirits were told as a precaution to keep children out of danger; he further explains the tales originated in bygone times when oral traditions were passed down the generations by grandparents retelling the stories. Writing in the Journal of American Folklore during 1918 the anthropologist James Teit hypothesises that, as is common with most supernatural creatures, nuggles were thought to be fallen angels.
