= Trow (folklore) =

Creature from Shetland and Orkney Island folklore

Creature information
- Other name: Troll
- Grouping: Mythical creature, folklore
- Similar entities: fairy, troll
- Folklore: Orkney folklore

Origin
- Known for: trolling
- Country: Orkneys, Shetland
- Region: Orkneys
- Habitat: Hills and earth mounds

A trow (/traʊ/) (Note: Rhyming with "how") or drow (also trowe, or dtrow) is a malignant or mischievous fairy or spirit in the folkloric traditions of the Orkney and Shetland islands. Trows may be regarded as monstrous giants at times, or quite the opposite, short-statured fairies dressed in grey.

Trows are nocturnal creatures, like the troll of Scandinavian legend with which the trow shares many similarities. They venture out of their 'trowie knowes' (earthen mound dwellings) solely in the evening, and often enter households as the inhabitants sleep. Trows traditionally have a fondness for music, and folktales tell of their habit of kidnapping musicians or luring them to their dens.

== Etymology ==
Insular Scots trow and drow are inherited words from Norn, the Old Norse dialect spoken in the Northern Isles before being driven out by Scots.

- The form drow derives from an unrecorded Norn: *drau (or thereof), from Old Norse: draugr, an old word for revenant, devil, troll, and thereof. (Note: Australian female writer Henry Handel Richardson (aka Ethel F. L. Robertson) in her uncredited 1896 translation of Bjørnstjerne Bjørnson's Fiskerjenten (tr. The Fisher Lass) rendered the Norwegian draug as "bogies", and defended this to her critical reviewer by noting ON draugr and Scots "drow" as the word's cognates. In her letter (writing as Miss Robertson) to Athenaeum, she gives herself credit, as translator of the Fisher Lass. Cf. her chronology of year 1896.) Similar development also appear in Norwegian: drau (1729) → drauv, drøv, drov, as well as in Scanian: dråe, drå, dro.
- The form trow is thought to stem from L-vocalization of troll ("troll"), and then intermixing with drow via linguistic and figurative convergence.

Draugr and troll have historically been used synonymously to some degree, along with related terms, like "mound dweller" (Old Norse: haugbúi), "the dead living within its mound (tomb)", which subsequently became a word for wight, nisse, brownie, and thereof, in descendant forms: Norwegian: haugbonde; Shetlandic: hjogfinni ("mound-found"); Orcadian: hogboon, hogboy; Lincolnshire: shag-boy.

== Terminology ==
=== Trow ===
The trow [trʌu], in the Scots language, is defined as a "sprite or fairy" of mischievous nature in dictionaries of Scots, particularly Orcadian and Shetland dialects.

=== Drow ===
The trow is also called drow under its variant spelling in the Insular dialects of Scots; the "drow" being mentioned by Walter Scott. (Note: Scott (1835) Demonology, p. 122: "Possession of supernatural wisdom is still imputed by the natives of Orkney and Zetland Islands, to the people called Drows, who may, in most other respects, be identified with the Caledonian fairies".) However, the term "drow" could also be used in the sense of "the devil" in Orkney, (Note: Jakobsen, Jakob (1928). An Etymological Dictionary of the Norn Language in Shetland . Vol. I. David Nutt (A. G. Berry). p. 129 – via Wikisource. Cf. Jakobsen (1921) in orig. Danish.) a motif also found in Scanian descendants of draugr, and thereof.

The word drow also occurs in the Shetland Norn language, where it means "hidden people" (troll-folk), a loose race or conglomeration of elfs, wights, gnomes (nisses, brownies), or trolls, etc., in Nordic folklore, or "ghost".

As drow is not a Norse language spelling, linguist Jakob Jakobsen proposed it was taken from the common (Scots) term "trow" altered to drow by assimilation with a Norn descendant of Old Norse draugr (cf. Norwegian: drau, 1729). The reconstructed Shetland word would be *drog if it did descend from Old Norse draugr, but this is unattested, nor was it adopted into the Nynorn vocabulary to supersede the known form.

=== Hogboon ===
Hogboon or hogboy are partial synonyms to trow in Orcadian and Northern Scotland. The words stem from Old Norse: haugbúi (definite haugbúinn → hogboon), "mound dweller", originally referring to "the dead living within its mound (tumulus)", akin to revenants like draugrs, but evolved along the lines of the "hidden-folk/mound-folk" (Faroese: huldufólk, Norwegian: huldrefolk), to refer to supernatural critters living underground, like wights, nissar, brownies, and thereof, in descendant forms.

Related forms includes Lincolnshire shag-boy. and Norwegian haugbonde.

=== Hjogfinni ===
Hjogfinni ("mound found") is the Shetlandic analog to hogboon, deriving from similar etymology, initially meaning "something found in a tumulus".

An Etymological Dictionary of the Norn Language in Shetland (1928) gives the definition: "a strange, odd-looking object or person; an odd, dwarfish being; brownie."

== General description ==
It was considered taboo to speak about trows. (Note: Briggs's entry on "trows" explains that a special exemption to the taboo was extended to Shetlander Jessie M. E. Saxby who, as the ninth child of a ninth child, was able to learn the lore.) It was also considered unlucky to catch sight of a trow, though auspicious to hear one speaking.

Their portrayed appearance can vary greatly: in some tellings they are described as gigantic and even multi-headed, as are some giants in English lore; in other tellings they are described as small or human-sized, like as is more typical of other fairies, but dressed in grey.

Trows consist of two kinds, the hill-trows (land trows) and sea-trows, and the two kinds are said to be mortal enemies.

Of the hill-dwelling types, it is said they can only appear out of their dwellings ("knowes"=knolls; "trowie knowes") after sunset, and if they miss the opportunity to return before sunrise, they do not perish but must await above ground and bide his time until "the Glüder (the sun) disappears again".

The trows are fond of music and constantly play the fiddle themselves. Sometimes a human learns such tunes, and there are traditional tunes purported to have been learned from the supernatural creatures (cf. §Trowie tunes below).

Tales are also told of human fiddlers being abducted by trows to their mounds, and although released after what seems a brief stay, many long years have elapsed in the outside world, and the victim turns to dust, or chooses to die. (Note: "The Fiddler o Gord", told by George P. S. Peterson, Brae, Shetland. Recorded by Alan Bruford 1974 (School of Scottish Studies recording SA 1974/204B1). Transcript by Bruford (1977); summarized with excerpt by Hillers (1994).)

== Sea-trow ==
There are varying descriptions concerning the sea-trow.

An early account is that of the trow (Latin: Troicis → Trowis) (Note: Ben's "trowis" is mentioned by Dalyell in 1835, but read as "Troicis" and recognized as "trow" by Samuel Hibbert (1822). The word was later also misread or misprinted as Troicis in MacFarlane & Mitchell edd. (1908), though emended back to Trowis against three manuscripts in Calder & MacDonald (1936).) of Stronsay, as described by Jo. Ben (i.e., John or Joseph Ben)'s (Note: Jo. being an abbreviation for "John" or "Joseph". He was said to be a non-local itinerant, a Scottish ecclesiastic making a tour of Orkney.) Description of the Orkney Islands (1529); it was a maritime monster resembling a colt whose entire body was cloaked in seaweed, with a coiled or matted coat of hair, sexual organs like a horse's, and known to engage in sexual intercourse (Note: concubuit, coeunt "copulate") with the women of the island.

The sea-trow of Orkney is "the ugliest imaginable" according to W. Traill Dennison, who says that it has been represented as a scaly creature with matted hair, having monkey-like face and sloping head. It was said to be frail-bodied with disproportionately huge sets of limbs, disc-shaped feet ("round as a millstone") with webbings on their hands and feet, causing them to move with a lumbering and "wabbling" slow gait. (Note: Ernest Marwick restates the same physical description, and remarks that the seaweed-covered, monstrously large creature is also known as "tangy" (tangie), in contrast to the Norse merman which is human-sized if not a bit smaller.)

However, in Shetland, "da mokkl sea-trow", a great evil spirit that dwelled in the depths, (Note: Translated as "the big sea-troll" by Teit, with the reminder that Scots trow is defined as‘sprite or fairy’, and Teit himself notes:"'trow' 'trou' or 'troll' seems to be applicable to any kind of super-natural being, but particularly to fairies or elves".) was said to take on the shape of a woman, at least in some instances. (Note: Edward Charlton (historian) remarks that a piece of coral from the deep "which bore a rude though striking resemblance to the human face and figure... was no doubt, regarded with awe by the.. Shetlanders, who would .. believe it to be a petrified mermaid or a great sea-trow converted into cranzie (coral)".)

It is blamed for awaiting in the depths and stealing from the fish caught on fishermen's lines, and otherwise feared for causing storms or causing ill luck to fishermen. In the form of the wailing woman, she portends some misfortune befalling the witness/audience.

According to Samuel Hibbert the sea-trow was a local version of the neckar, and he specified that it was reputed to be decked with various stuff from out of the sea, especially fuci (Fucus spp. of seaweed), whose larger forms near shore are known as "tang" in Shetland. And though Hibbert does not make the connection, E. Marwick equated the sea-trow with the "tangy", as already noted.

== Landmarks ==
Most mounds in Orkney are associated with "mound-dweller[s]" (hogboon; Old Norse: haugbúinn; Norwegian: haugbonde) living inside them, (Note: Marwick, E. (2000) [1975], pp. 39–40; Muir (2003), pp. 203–204 apud Lee (2015), pp. 139–140.) and though local lore does always specify, the dweller is commonly the trow.

A reputedly trow-haunted mound may not in fact be a burial mound. The Long Howe in Tankerness, a glacial mound, was believed to contain trows, and thus avoided after dark. A group of mounds around Trowie Glen in Hoy are also geological formations, but feared for its trows throughout the valley, and also unapproached after dark.

The stone circle on Fetlar has been dubbed the Haltadans (meaning ‘Limping Dance’) since according to legend, they represent a group of petrified music-loving trows who were so engrossed by dancing to the trowie fiddler's tunes that they failed to hide before dawn's break.

On the mainland in Canisbay, Caithness is a "Mire of Trowskerry" associated with trows.

== Trowie tunes ==
Some Shetland fiddle tunes are said to have come to human fiddlers when they heard the trows playing, and are known as "Trowie Tunes". A selection is offered in the anthology Da Mirrie Dancers (1985).

"Da Trøila Knowe" ('The Knoll of the Trolls') is one example. "Da Trowie Burn" is also an alleged trowie tune, though its composition is attributed to Friedemann Stickle. This apparent contradiction is resolved in the case of "Da Trow's Reel", which was allegedly a tune that another man reputedly obtained from a trow, and he had whistled the tune over to Stickle on a different boat for him to set down the score. "Da Peerie Hoose in under da Hill" ('The Little House under the Hill') is yet another trowie tune as well.

Another trowie tune "Winyadepla", performed by Tom Anderson on his album with Aly Bain, The Silver Bow. (Note: "... a troop of peerie folk came in. A woman took off the nappie from her baby and hung it on Gibbie's leg, near the fire, to dry. Then one of the trows said, "What'll we do ta da sleeper?" "Lat him aleen," replied the woman, "he's no a ill body. Tell Shanko ti gie him a ton." Said Shanko, "A ton he sall hae, an we'll drink his blaand." After drinking, they trooped out of the mill, and danced on the green nearby ...".)

== Kunal trows ==
A Kunal-Trow (or King-Trow) is a type of trow in the lore of Unst, Shetland. The Kunal-Trow is alleged to be a race without females, and said to wander after dark and sometimes found weeping due to the lack of companionship. But they do take human wife, once in their lives, and she invariably dies after giving birth to a son. The Kunal-Trow would subsequently require the service of a human wet-nurse, and may abduct a midwife for this purpose.

They are said to consume earth formed into shapes of fish and fowl, even babies, which taste and smell like the real thing.

One (a King-Trow) famously haunted a broch ruin. Another married a witch who extracted all the trow's secrets, and gave birth to Ganfer (astral body) and Finis (an apparition who appears in the guise of someone whose death is imminent), yet she has cheated death with her arts.

== Parallels ==
Ben's sea-trow (trowis) bore resemblance to the anciently known incubus, as it "seems to have occupied the visions of the female sex", as noted by John Graham Dalyell (1835).

The learning of music from fairies is recognized as a recurring theme in Scandinavian and Celtic folklore. Examples in Irish tradition relate how a lutharachán (dialect form of leprechaun) or púca teaches tunes, like the Shetlandic trow who lets his music be heard from his fairy mound or otherwise; such tales classifiable as Migratory Legends "Type 4091, Music Taught by Fairie (Fiddle on the Wall)" under Bo Almqvist's modified system (Note: Reidar Thoralf Christiansen's original Migratory Legends established "Type 4090, Watersprite Teaches Someone to Play", and included Shetland as having this tale type; so a Shetlandic tale of some water-sprite teaching music is assumed to exist.)

The tale of a fiddler being taken to a fairy mound by fairies or trows is known by several versions in Shetland, but has also been collected from Orkney and the Scottish mainland (Inverness), and the group is assigned "F24. Fiddler Enlisted to Play for Fairy Dancers" under Alan Bruford's provisional classification scheme.

== Origins ==
Book author Joan Dey (1991) speculates that the tradition concerning the trows (Note: And perhaps that of the selkie) may be based in part on the Norse invasions of the Northern Isles. She states that the conquest by the Vikings sent the indigenous, dark-haired Picts into hiding and that "many stories exist in Shetland of these strange people, smaller and darker than the tall, blond Vikings who, having been driven off their land into sea-caves, emerged at night to steal from the new land owners". (Note: Though, most Roman sources describe the Picts as tall, long-limbed and red or fair haired.)

Shetland folklore spoke of the presence of the Pechs (mythologized version of the Picts) inside the fairy knolls ("trowie knowe"), who could be heard clinking their tools on silver and gold.Saxby (1932), pp. 89, 186

== See also ==
- Dark elf (disambiguation)
- Drow (Dungeons & Dragons)
- Goblin
- Kobold
- Leprechaun
- Sprite
