= Muckle Water =

Loch on Rousay Island, Orkney, Scotland

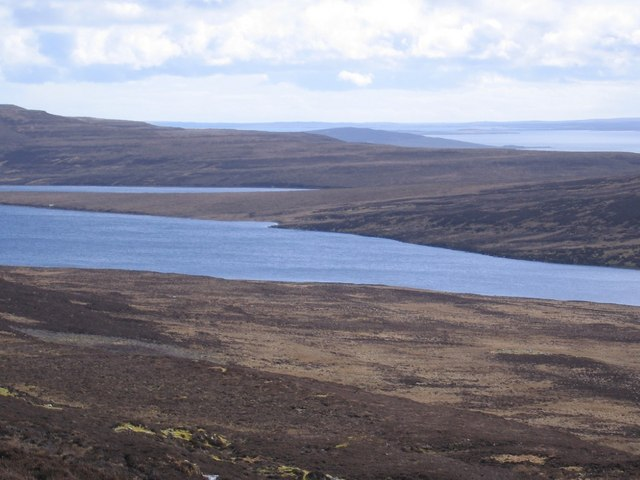
- The Muckle Water on Rousay's southside

- Location within Orkney Islands
- Location: Rousay, Orkney, Scotland
- Coordinates: 59°09′12″N 3°03′40″W
- Type: freshwater loch
- Primary outflows: Suso Burn on the eastern shore, into the Sound of Rousay
- Basin countries: Scotland
- Max. length: 1.25 mi (2.01 km)
- Max. width: 0.25 mi (0.40 km)
- Surface area: 45.2 ha (112 acres)
- Average depth: 11 ft (3.4 m)
- Max. depth: 20 ft (6.1 m)
- Water volume: 58,000,000 ft^{3} (1,600,000 m^{3})
- Surface elevation: 98 m (322 ft)

Muckle Water is a long, narrow fresh water loch on Ward Hill on Rousay, Orkney, Scotland. It is the biggest loch on the island and is popular for fishing. It can be reached by a track from the roadside. The Suso Burn on the north eastern shore drains the loch into the Sound of Rousay.

A rare hybrid pondweed (Potamogeton sp.) is found in the loch as a result of its unique nutrient levels.

The loch was surveyed in 1906 by James Murray and later charted as part of The Bathymetrical Survey of Fresh-Water Lochs of Scotland 1897–1909.

== The Nuggle ==
In Orkney folklore it is said that Muckle Water is haunted by a Nuggle, a magical creature usually in the form of horse similar to the Celtic kelpie. The Nuggle waits at the loch side until someone climbs on its back then it plunges into the water drowning its rider. It was said that only Finmen could ride the Nuggle.
