= Born to Be with You =

"Born to Be with You" may refer to:

- "Born to Be with You" (song), a 1956 song popularized by The Chordettes
- Born To Be With You (song) a single released by The Silkie in June 1966
- Born To Be With You (album), a 1975 album by Dion DiMucci
