= Finn-men =

Inuit seen in Scotland in 1682 and later

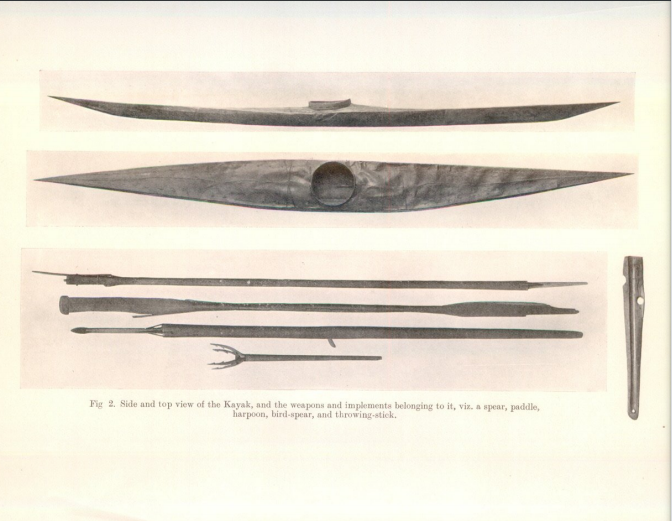

Finn-men, also known as Muckle men, Fion and Fin Finn, were Inuit sighted in the 17th century around the Northern Isles of Scotland.

== Sightings ==
The first recorded sighting was in Orkney, in 1682. James Wallace, writing in about 1688, described a Finn-man in his "little Boat" at the south end of Eday being seen by the people of the island from the shore, and then fleeing swiftly when the islanders put out a boat to try and apprehend him. In 1684, a Finn-man seen at Westray was connected with the disappearance of fish from the area. A boat was captured in Orkney, and sent to the Physicians Hall in Edinburgh.

== Origins ==
The "Finn-men" were initially identified as "Finns", an umbrella term used in the local language of the Orcadians to denote either Lapps, Kvens or Forest Finns. However, these "Finn-men" were in fact Inuit from the Davis Strait region, a fact recognised by Wallace. As it was considered more probable that they had sailed to the islands from the Cap of the North, the misnomer persisted nonetheless, possibly due to certain phonological similarities between the Greenlandic language spoken by the kayakers and the Finnic languages.

Wallace's eldest son James added a note to a 1700 publication of his father's account, suggesting they had been driven off course to Scotland by storms. The most likely reason for their arrival is that they were escaped prisoners, having been taken by European ships as exotic curiosities. Such was the concern about this practice that in 1720 the States General of the Netherlands passed a law prohibiting the murder or kidnapping of Inuit.

== Description ==
John Brand, in A Brief Description of Orkney, described a sighting of a Finn-man.

There are frequently Finmen seen here upon the coasts, as one about a year ago on Stronsa, and another within these few months on Westra, a gentleman with many others in the isle looking on him nigh to the shore, but when any endeavour to apprehend them, they flee away most swiftly; which is very strange, that one man, sitting in his little boat, should come some hundred of leagues from their own coasts, as they reckon Finland to be from Orkney; it may be thought wonderful how they live all that time, and are able to keep the sea so long. His boat is made of seal skins or some kind of leather, he also hath a coat of leather upon him, and he sitteth in the middle of his boat, with a little oar in his hand, fishing with his lines: and when in a storm he sees the high surge of a wave approaching, he hath a way of sinking his boat, till the wave pass over, least thereby he should be overturned. The fishers here observe that these Finmen or Finland-men by their coming drive away the fishes from the coasts. One of their boats is kept as a rarity in the Physicians Hall in Edinburgh.

=== Artefacts ===
Kayaks belonging to Finn-men are preserved in Edinburgh and Aberdeen.

== Mythology ==
The Finn-men were grafted onto the existing mythologies that surrounded the selkies and Finfolk, to the point that both creatures may have both been the same in folklore. Their appearance was interpreted in terms of those traditions.

== See also ==
- Blond Eskimos
- Inuit navigation
