= Sea Mither =

Creature in Orcadian folklore

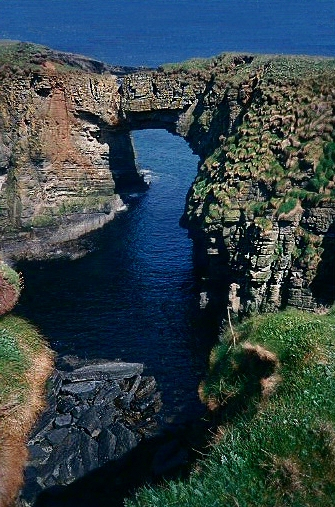
The seas of Orkney are calm during the periods of Sea Mither's reign.

Sea Mither, or Mither of the Sea, is a mythical being of Orcadian folklore that lives in the sea during summer, when she confines the demonic nuckelavee to the ocean depths. Each spring she battles with her arch-enemy Teran, another spirit of Orcadian legend capable of causing severe winter storms, to gain control of the seas and the weather. Eventually Sea Mither overcomes Teran and sends him to the depths of the ocean, but the effort of keeping him confined there along with her other benevolent labours during the summer exhaust her, until in the autumn Teran takes advantage of her weakness to wrest control from her once again.

Stories of the Sea Mither and Teran are among Orkney's oldest legends, perhaps invented to explain the vagaries of weather and other naturally occurring events. In Shetland, fishermen petition Sea Mither to afford them protection from the Devil.

== Etymology ==
Mither is defined in the Dictionary of the Older Scottish Tongue as the Scots variant of "mother", which may particularly reflect oral Orcadian use. The name of her opponent, Teran, is local Orkney dialect meaning "furious anger", and may be a derivative of tyrren, Norse for "angry".

== Folk beliefs ==
=== Description and common attributes ===
Sea Mither is a spirit of summer days that quells the turbulent sea waters around the northern isles of Scotland. Shetland islanders, particularly fishermen, seek her protection from the Devil. Control of the seas is maintained by Teran, the spirit of winter, until Sea Mither arrives around the time of the vernal equinox in mid-March. Both spirits are invisible to humans. Teran is her arch-enemy and the pair fight bitterly, often for weeks as she tries to gain control. Their arguments cause gale-force winds and heavy tumultuous seas as she tries to wrest control from him. Teran's screeches are carried by the howling gales as the two spirits try to oust each other. The period of the spring combat between the pair is termed the "Vore tullye" or the "spring struggle". Eventually Sea Mither overcomes Teran, relegating him to the depths of the ocean; inclement summer weather is caused by Teran's attempts to escape.

During summer months the Sea Mither also keeps the demonic nuckelavee creature confined, and undertakes benevolent labours: she empowers aquatic creatures with the ability to reproduce; warms and calms the seas; and instils a softer song-like quality to the gentle summer breeze. According to folklorist and Orkney resident Walter Traill Dennison, during Sea Mither's reign in summer the conditions reported by islanders may have "tempted one to believe that the Orkney archipelago had become the islands of the blessed." But the continual work she undertakes to keep everything calm and the strain of maintaining control over Teran gradually tires her.

As autumn approaches, Teran takes advantage of Sea Mither's exhaustion to break free, and conflict between the two starts again. The power struggles cause the weather to change with darkening skies and howling winds. This time, Teran triumphs in the conflict termed the "Gore vellye". (Note: Translations given for this vary; Traill Dennison gives "harvest destructive work", whereas Marwick states "autumn tumult".) Control of the ocean and weather is returned to Teran and Sea Mither is forced to leave. Teran possesses a malevolent grip on the seas, creating turbulent storms, freezing the seas, and causing aquatic creatures to refrain from reproducing; the status of the nuckelavee's activity is unknown during Teran's reign. No details are given as to where she spends the winter, but during the storms caused by Teran the fishermen were consoled that Sea Mither would return refreshed and powerful in the spring, to again oust Teran from his grip over the seas.

== Origins ==
Orcadian tales were strongly influenced by Scandinavian mythology with a blending of traditional Celtic stories. Folklorist and writer Ernest Marwick describes the Sea Mither and Teran as "pure personifications of nature." Several ancient myths were based upon the natural elements of the turbulent and ever changing sea surrounding Orkney, but the stories of the two spirits are among the oldest legends on the islands. People had to be able to explain the vagaries of weather and other natural life cycles without the benefit of science; Traill Dennison hypothesises that this is why "the imagination of some half savage" may have formed the foundations of the myth.
