= Teran =

Teran may refer to:

- Teran grape, Croatian red grape variety and wine
- Teran, Slovene name for Terrano (grape) of the Refosco grape family
- Teran, battled the Sea Mither in Orkney legend

== See also ==
- Tehran (disambiguation)
- Terán (disambiguation)
