= Inuit navigation =

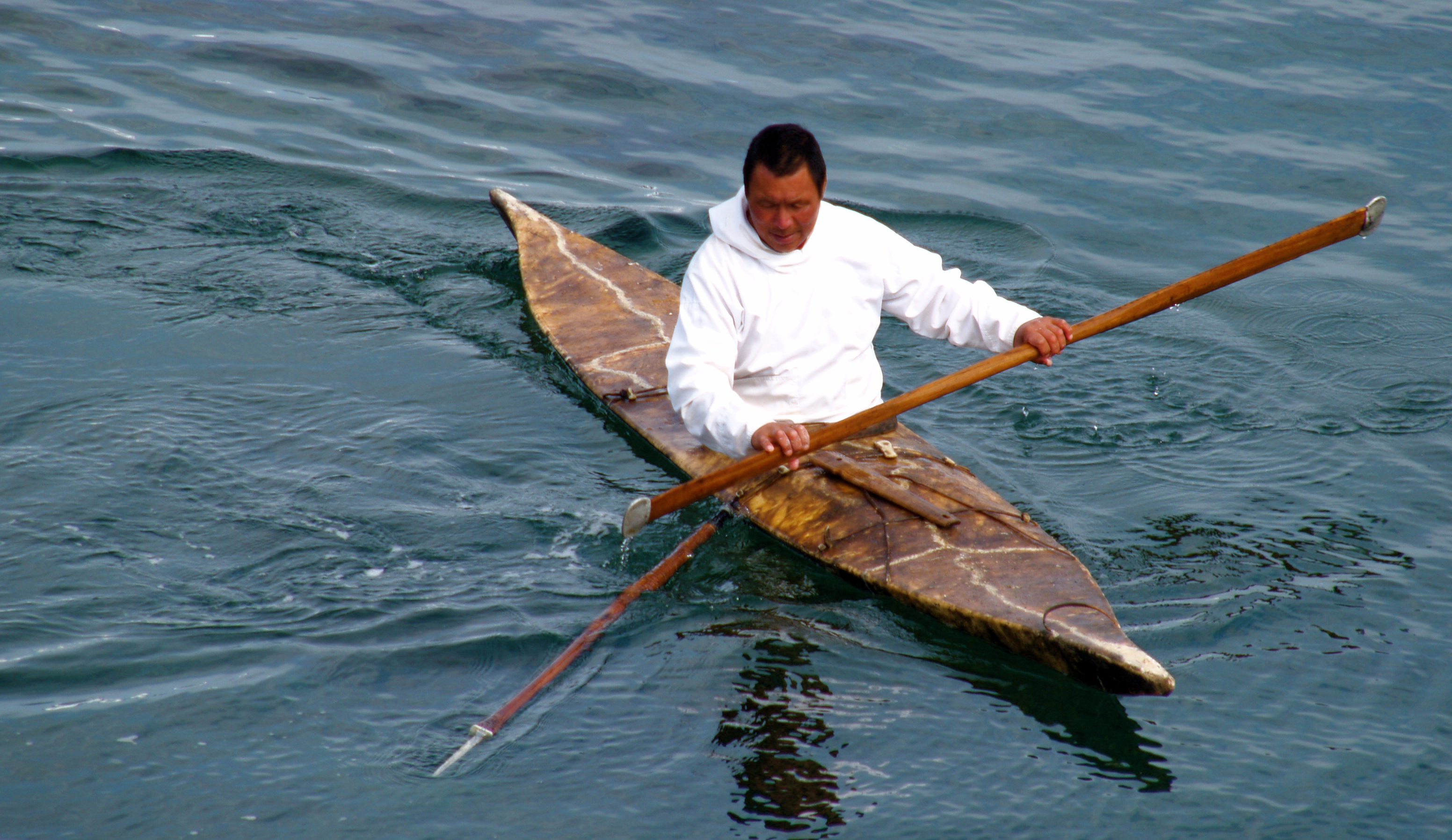
Inuit seal hunter in a qajaq, armed with a harpoon

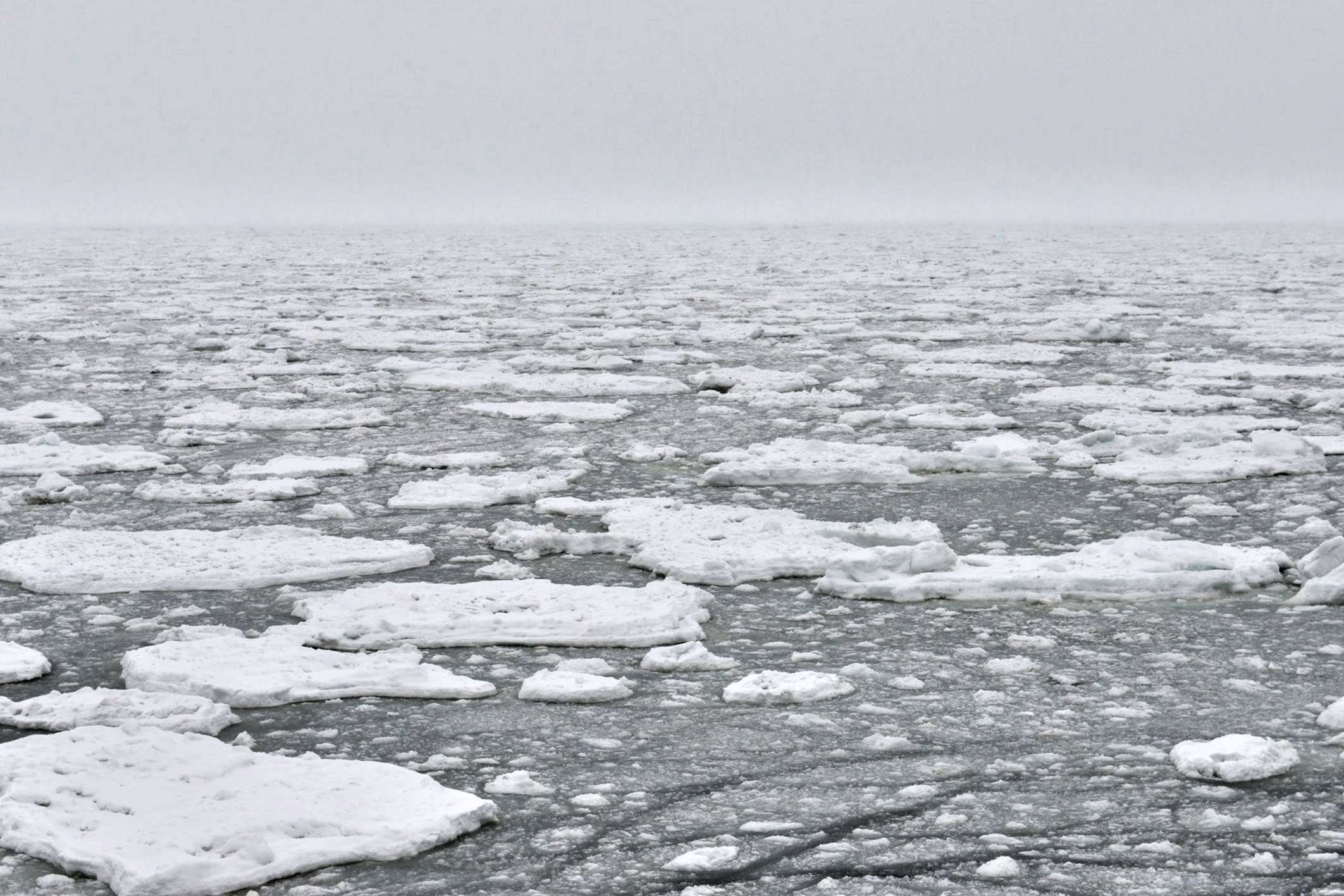
Photo from on board the MS Hanseatic, 2014-08-27: Polar ice limit (Record position 85°40,7818’ N, 135°38,8735‘ E)

Inuit navigation techniques are those navigation skills used for thousands of years by the Inuit, a group of culturally similar indigenous peoples who inhabit the Arctic and subarctic regions of Greenland, Canada, and Alaska (United States). On the tundra, Inuit hunters would travel for long distances when hunting for game, and on the coastal waters, hunters would travel out of the sight of land, and they would need to orientate themselves to the location of favoured fishing or hunting places, or on the return journey to their dwelling place.

The Inuit relied on a large body of knowledge from oral tradition to navigate across tundra, sea ice, and open sea, that presented, to those not familiar with the knowledge, as indistinguishable and seemingly monotonous landscapes, and also rapidly changing seascapes, with few navigation points of reference during a blizzard or white-out and when out of sight of islands, coastal landmarks, or features on the horizon.

Inuit hunters orient themselves on the land through their understanding of prevailing winds and the patterns resulting in snowdrifts and an understanding of caribou, fish and bird migration behaviour, and astronomical observation. The Inuit languages allowed them to describe nuanced differences in snow and the patterns resulting from the effect of the prevailing wind on snowdrifts and ice formations.

The Inuit possessed a comprehensive native system of toponymy to name any geographical feature. Where natural landmarks were insufficient, the Inuit would erect an inuksuk (inukshuk or rock cairn).

The latitude of the Arctic environment results in long periods of sunlight during summer, and cold, dark, snow-covered winter conditions, with the surface of the Arctic Ocean freezing. A definition of the Arctic region, describes it as the area north of the Arctic Circle (about 66° 34'N), the approximate southern limit of the midnight sun and polar night. The number of days per year with midnight sun (or polar night) increasing the closer one goes towards the geographical North Pole.

== Celestial navigation ==
Celestial navigation is available to Inuit travellers, although the time that navigation technique is available is limited by the variability of night-time through the year and other factors. Cloudy and blizzard conditions and the light of the aurora borealis limit its use. Snow that was kept airborne by the wind, created a type of fog. Even if the night sky was free of clouds or snow fog, the moonlight shining on the ice and snow, and reflecting into the sky, could obscure the view of the stars.

== Navigation on sea ice ==
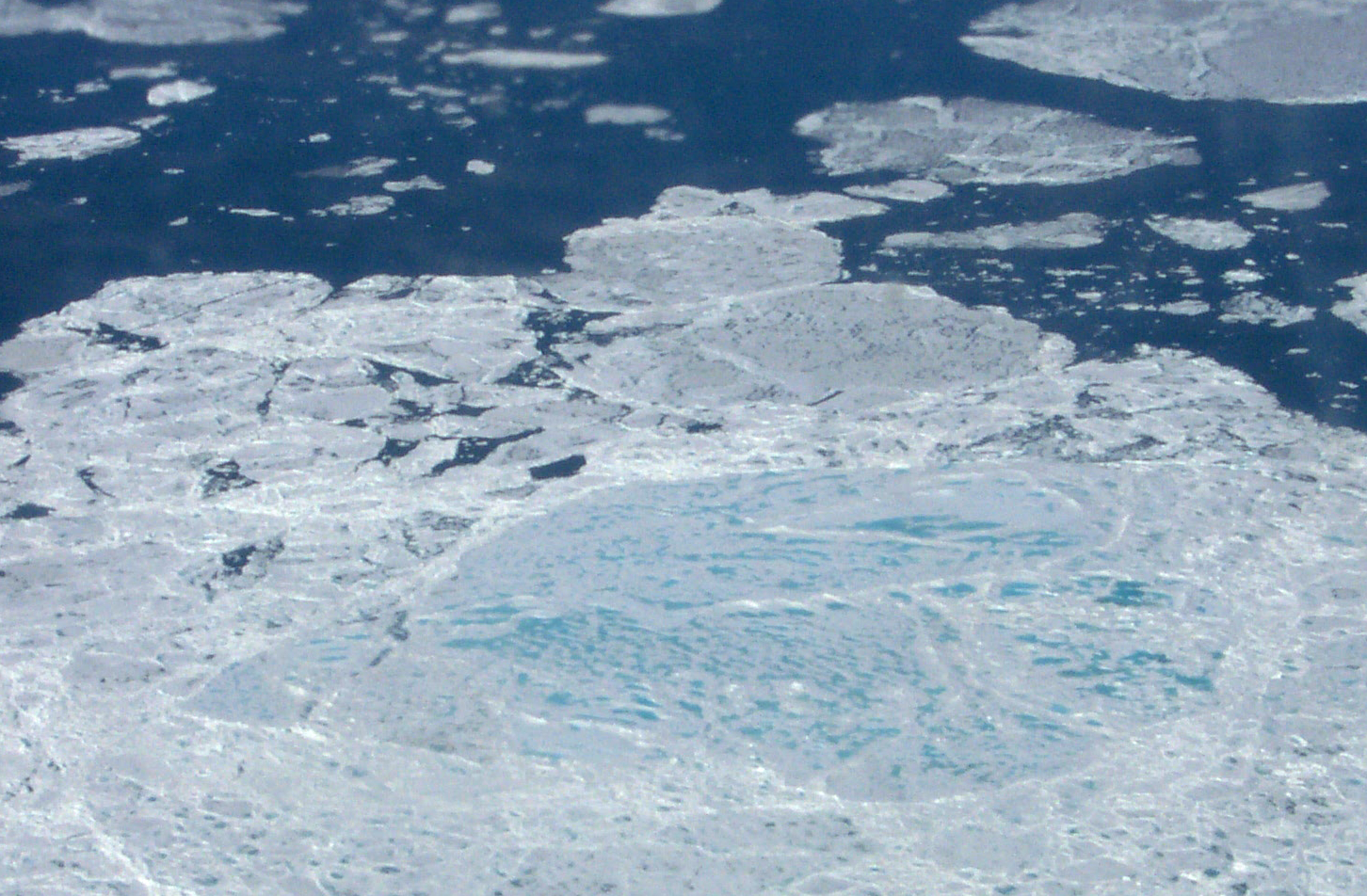
This photograph, from a plane, shows a section of sea ice. The lighter blue areas are melt ponds, and the darkest areas are open water.

The Inuit languages described the prevailing winds of the place or region and also the sea ice conditions that could result from the winds, tides and currents. Inuit travellers could orientate themselves, and give directions to others, to describing sea-ice conditions that were known to recur at the same locations each year: such as, ice dunes and pressure ridges, an ice build-up, polynyas, areas of open water surrounded by sea ice, caused by the prevailing wind or marine currents, and ice cracks or leads opening in the drift ice zone.

The areas of open water resulting from polynyas, ice cracks and leads could be identified on the horizon as resulting in a blue reflection of the water on the sky that was different to the background colour of the sky.

== Navigation on land ==
The prevailing wind is the most reliable source of spatial orientation for Inuit travellers because of the prevailing wind would cause consistent shapes and patterns in the snowdrifts, including sastrugi, which the Inuit call kalutoqaniq. These distinctive shapes and patterns would be features on the snowscape, which would indicate the direction of the prevailing wind. Inuit travellers to set their bearings using these distinctive shapes and patterns in the snowdrifts while travelling across the flat tundra, or when a blizzard or other weather conditions or darkness obscured other features or landmarks.

The Inuit would erect inuksuk (rock cairns), with various designs meeting different purposes, such as the grave of an angakkuq, or to funnel caribou to assist in hunting, which would also act as navigational indicators.

== Transport ==
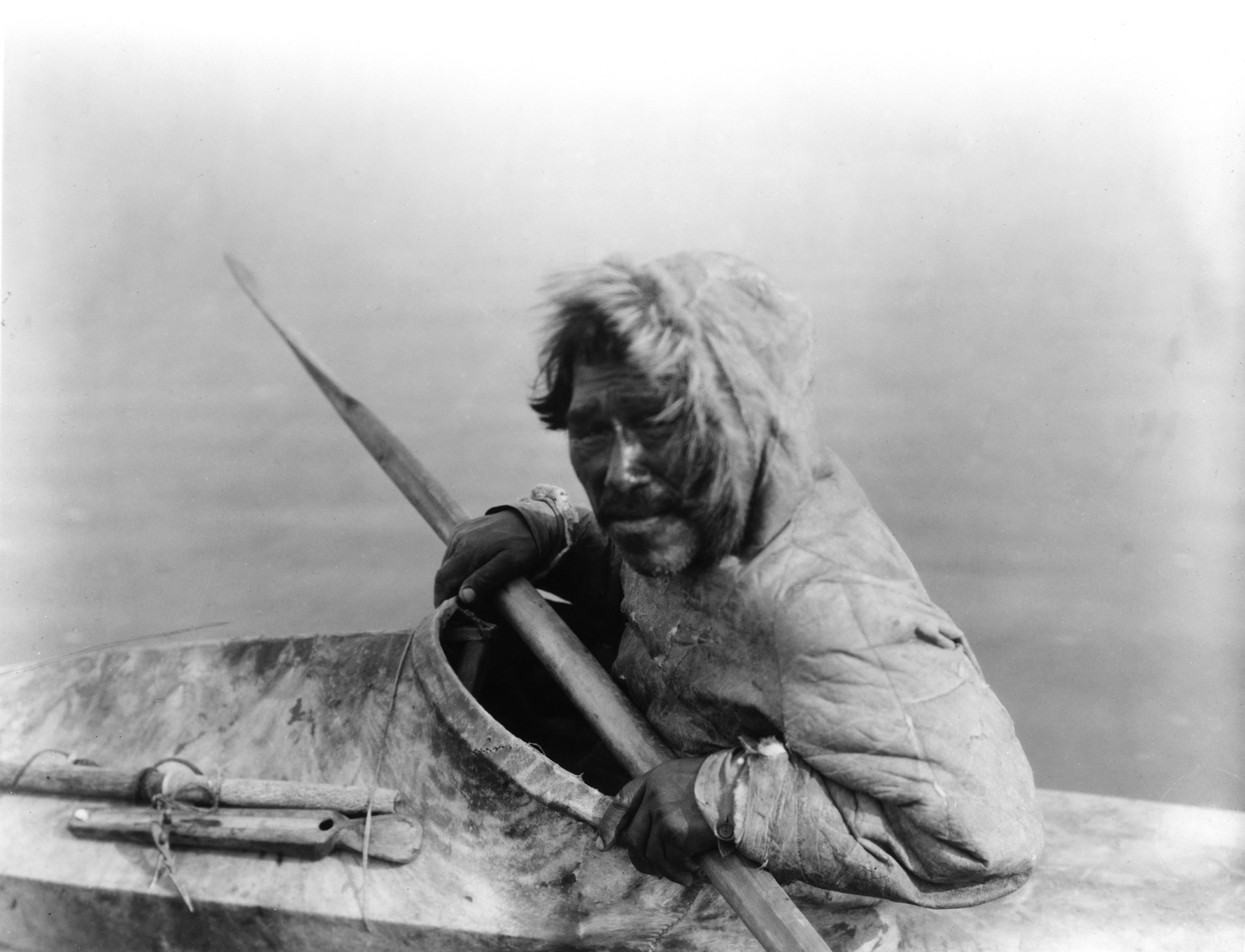
Iñupiat man in a kayak, Noatak, Alaska, c. 1929 (photo by Edward S. Curtis)

In summer the Inuit hunted sea animals from single-passenger, covered seal-skin boats called qajaq (Inuktitut syllabics: ᖃᔭᖅ) which were extraordinarily buoyant, and could easily be righted by a seated person, even if completely overturned. Because of this property, the design was copied by Europeans and Americans who still produce them under the English name kayak.

Inuit also made umiaq (known in some areas as a "woman's boat"), larger open boats made of wood frames covered with animal skins, for transporting people, goods, and dogs. They were 6–12 m (20–39 ft) long and had a flat bottom so that the boats could come close to shore.

In winter, both on land and on sea ice, the Inuit used dog sleds (qamutik) for transportation. The husky dog breed comes from the Siberian Husky. The current evidence infers that their ancestors were domesticated in Siberia 23,000 years ago by ancient North Siberians, then later dispersed eastward into the Americas and westward across Eurasia. A team of dogs in either a tandem/side-by-side or fan formation would pull a sled made of wood, animal bones, or the baleen from a whale's mouth and even frozen fish, over the snow and ice.

== Map making ==
Inuit navigators understood the concept of maps and could construct a relief map from sand, sticks, and pebbles to give directions to others. Maps were also drawn on skins using plant dyes. For example, the bark of the alder tree provided a red-brown shade, and spruce produced red, and berries, lichen, moss and algae also provided colours.

Greenlandic Inuit created Ammassalik wooden maps, which are carved portable maps made from driftwood that represent the coast line.

== Sources ==
- Issenman, Betty Kobayashi (1997). Sinews of Survival: the Living Legacy of Inuit Clothing. Vancouver: UBC Press. ISBN 978-0-7748-5641-6. OCLC 923445644.
- Renouf, M. A. P.; Bell, T. (2008). "Dorset Palaeoeskimo Skin Processing at Phillip's Garden, Port au Choix, Northwestern Newfoundland". Arctic. 61 (1): 35–47. doi:10.14430/arctic5. ISSN 0004-0843. JSTOR 40513180.

== See also ==
- Polynesian navigation
- Micronesian navigation
- Finn-men
- Viking ships
