= A Stranger Came Ashore =

Book by Mollie Hunter

- First edition
- Author: Mollie Hunter
- Language: English/Scots
- Genre: Fantasy; Horror
- Publisher: Hamish Hamilton
- Publication date: 7 August 1975
- Publication place: Scotland
- Media type: Print (Hardcover and Paperback)
- ISBN: 0-241-89241-4

A Stranger Came Ashore is a 1975 young adult novel written by Scottish author Mollie Hunter. Set in the Shetland Islands in the north of Scotland, the plot revolves around a boy called Robbie Henderson, his family and a mysterious stranger named Finn Learson.

== Plot summary ==
One night on the island of Black Ness, the Hendersons are sitting at home in their but-and-benhouse. There is a heavy storm outside. Then a figure bursts through the door, soaking wet. He is tall, lean and handsome, and calls himself Finn Learson, and he claims to be the only survivor of a shipwreck. The Hendersons trust and help him, except the youngest child, Robbie, his Old Da (grandfather), and his dog Tam, who are suspicious of Finn. Old Da takes an instant dislike to Finn, and Robbie also senses the man is not what he seems. Later that night, when the family have retired to bed, Robbie cannot sleep and hears peculiar noises coming from the main room, where Finn Learson and the dog, Tam, are sleeping. Robbie ventures to peek around the door and is horrified to see that Tam is crouched low to attack Learson, but Learson gazes deep into the dog's eyes... sending Tam into a calm sleep. Robbie is appalled but hides what he has seen.

Old Da mysteriously dies not long after, but before he does he warns Robbie not to trust Finn. He reminds Robbie of stories of selkies, sea spirits which are seals in the water but are able to shed their seal skin on dry land and appear as beautiful seductive humans. Robbie remembers stories about the Great Selkie, the malign ruler of the selkies, who dwells in his sea-palace and seduces golden-haired girls away with him to his home under the sea. Every so often, the Great Selkie returns to find another human bride, as each bride he abducts dies whenever she tries to escape his clutches; he then uses their golden hair to roof his palace. Robbie begins to fear for his elder sister, Elspeth, who is golden-haired, very beautiful and entranced by Finn Learson.

Robbie becomes convinced that Finn is the Great Selkie, but his family does not believe him. Elspeth states that she will choose one man, Finn or Nicol, (Nicol, who was her man before Finn Learson came ashore) to marry her on the celebration night of Up Helly Aa. Robbie goes to the schoolmaster, Yarl Corbie, for help. Yarl has been accused of being a wizard. Yarl reveals that Finn is indeed the Great Selkie, that he knew all along, and that Finn will try to tempt Elspeth to join him under the sea, as he did with Yarl's fiancée many years before. With help from Yarl, Robbie steals Finn's seal skin and hides it in a place where Finn won't be able to leave without turning into the great selkie in front of everyone. On Up Helly Aa, Robbie plans with Nicol (who will do anything to save Elspeth even though he doesn't really believe Robbie) to trap Finn and fight him. Yarl uses his magic to morph into a raven, pulling out one of Finn's eyes. Finn, revealed as the Great Selkie, flees back into the sea in his seal form. He can still hunt fish with his remaining eye, but he can no longer return ashore to tempt girls away with him, as, without an eye, he is no longer handsome.

== See also ==
- Scottish mythology
- Selkie
- Shetland
