= The Stronghold (novel) =

1974 book by Mollie Hunter

- Front cover of first edition
- Author: Mollie Hunter
- Cover artist: Charles Keeping
- Language: English
- Genre: Children's historical novel
- Publisher: Hamish Hamilton
- Publication date: May 1974
- Publication place: United Kingdom
- Media type: Print (hardback and paperback)
- Pages: 205 pp (first edition)
- ISBN: 0-241-89026-8
- OCLC: 8238633
- LC Class: PZ7.M18543 St

The Stronghold is a children's historical novel by the Scottish writer Mollie Hunter, published by Hamilton in 1974. Set in the Orkney islands during the 1st century BC, the story is an imaginative reconstruction of the development of the broch, the circular stronghold design of fortifications that dot the islands. The main character is a lame young dreamer who turns his fear of the Roman slave-raiders into a strength, not only for himself, but for all the islanders.

Hunter won the annual Carnegie Medal from the Library Association, recognising the year's best children's book by a British subject.

== Setting ==
The action is set on the largest of the Orkney islands (now known as Mainland). At the time of the story it is largely settled by the tribe of the Boar (Ork in their language), but the original inhabitants, the tribes of the Deer and the Raven, still live on the island, more numerous all together than the people of the Boar but divided by old rivalries. The tribe of the Boar is matrilineal, the Chief coming to power through his marriage to the former Chief's oldest daughter. The power of the Druids, maintained through ritual and secrecy, is still strong. The Roman Republic is extending its influence outwards, and invasion is feared. Meanwhile, the Roman civilisation requires ever more slaves, hence the raids that have been going on for decades.

In the foreword, the author describes the Orkney brochs, structures which have no parallel anywhere in the world. She recalls standing in one of the brochs, ten years earlier, wondering how they came to be built and considering that because of their uniqueness they must have sprung from an idea in a single brilliant mind.

== Plot summary ==
The novel opens on the day when over seven hundred Men of the Boar from many islands gather together, summoned by the chief Nectan. Nectan puts forth the proposal that the warriors should no longer fight the Roman raiders but rather retreat when they approach, as the tribe's very existence is threatened by their losses. The Chief Druid strongly opposes the idea, saying they must continue to fight; he declares it a matter of faith and therefore his domain, directly challenging Nectan's leadership.

Coll is convinced that his idea of a high circular drystone stronghold, designed to be impregnable, is a third way. He has been developing the idea, drawing plans and building models, since he was five, when a Roman raider killed his father, abducted his mother and shattered Coll's leg, crippling him. However, none of the elders will listen to him.

Taran arrives, introducing himself as a member of the tribe who was seized for a slave when he was twelve and recently escaped by killing his master. He is welcomed, but it soon appears that he has a desire for power, seeking first to ingratiate himself with the chief's daughter and then plotting with the Druids and the chiefs of the Raven and the Deer. Coll's brother Bran, who lives with the Druids, is torn between the two camps.

The struggle between Nectan and Domnall for mastery of the tribe culminates in Domnall choosing Nectan's daughter Fand for a human sacrifice. Coll, who loves Fand, takes the advice of Bran on how to stop the sacrifice, believing that he will die in her place. In fact it is Bran who dies, fulfilling the prophecy made about him when he was a baby and devastating Domnall who loved him like a son.

In the wake of these events, Coll is given leave to build his Stronghold. The whole tribe works long and hard to build the 8-storey structure, and it is ready just before the first raid of the summer. The warriors prepare to defend it while the other tribespeople go into hiding. The first assault is repulsed, though Domnall is downed while shouting curses in Latin at the Romans. Taran, who also knows Latin, takes his place, but though pretending to curse, actually advises the Romans to make a second attack overland. When Taran's treachery is exposed, Coll devises a plan to trap the Romans that is extremely successful. His Stronghold is vindicated and plans are made to build more, all over the islands.

== Characters ==
- Coll, a 17-year-old Man of the Boar, lame since childhood, Nectan's foster-son
- Nectan, the Chief of the Boar
- Anu, the wife of Nectan, daughter of the former Chief, leader of the womenfolk
- Clodha, Nectan's older daughter
- Fand, Nectan's younger daughter
- Niall, Coll's best friend, Clodha's intended husband
- Domnall, the Chief of the islands' priesthood of Druids
- Bran, Coll's younger brother, raised by the Druids, prophesied to be a child of destiny
- Taran, an ambitious ex-slave
- Arcon, the Chief of the Deer
- Deva, the Chief of the Raven

== See also ==
- History of Orkney

Awards
Preceded by The Ghost of Thomas Kempe	Carnegie Medal recipient 1974	Succeeded by The Machine Gunners
