= Tangie =

Sea spirit in British Isles folklore

A tangie (or tongie) is a shape-shifting sea spirit in the folklore of the Orkney and Shetland Islands in Scotland. A sea horse or merman, it takes on the appearance of either a horse or an aged man. Usually described as being covered with seaweed, its name derives from "tang" (Note: Cognate with Old Norse and Faroese þang and Danish tang.) or seaweed of the genus Fucus.

It is known for terrorizing lonely travellers, especially young women on roads at night near the lochs, whom it will abduct and devour under the water.

Similar yet distinctive from the smaller, less harmful Nuggle, a tangie is able to cause derangement in humans and animals.

The tangie plays a major role in the Shetland legend of Black Eric, a sheep rustler. The tangie he rode gave him supernatural assistance when he raided and harassed surrounding crofts. In his final battle with crofter Sandy Breamer, Black Eric fell to his death in the sea. The tangie then continued to terrorize the area, particularly the young women he was hoping to abduct.

== See also ==
- Kelpie
- Nuckelavee
