= Eileen Colgan =

Irish actress (1934–2014)

Eileen Colgan Simpson (2 January 1934 – 10 March 2014) was an Irish theatre, television and film actress. She was best known for her recurring role as Esther Roche on the RTÉ One soap opera, Fair City. She also appeared in the RTÉ television drama, Glenroe, as Mynah, the housekeeper of the priest. Her other television credits included Ballykissangel, The Hanging Gale and Strumpet City.

== Life and career ==
She began her acting career in Irish theatre in Dublin. Colgan then moved to London, where she appeared in television and radio roles. She also appeared on stage in Tokyo.

Colgan was a longtime member of the Abbey Theatre Players in Dublin from 1971 until 1988. In 1973, she won a Jacob's Award for Best Television Performance by an Actress for her role in Hatchet.

Her filmography included roles in Quackser Fortune Has a Cousin in the Bronx in 1970, My Left Foot in 1989, Far and Away in 1992, The Secret of Roan Inish in 1994, Angela's Ashes in 1999, and Tara Road in 2005.

== Death and legacy ==
Eileen Colgan died on 10 March 2014, at the age of 80. She was survived by four children and eight grandchildren. Colgan was the widow of theatre director Alan Simpson, whom she had married after his divorce from Carolyn Swift. Simpson died in 1980.

== Filmography ==
Year	Title	Role	Notes
1970	Quackser Fortune Has a Cousin in the Bronx	Betsy Bourke	
1989	My Left Foot	Nan	
1990	Fools of Fortune	Mrs. Woodcombe	
1992	Far and Away	Lady #1	
1994	Widows' Peak	Mrs. Fogerty	
1994	The Secret of Roan Inish	Tess	
1999	Angela's Ashes	Philomena	
2003	Mystics	Shop Supervisor	
2005	Tara Road	Nora	
2008	A Film with Me in It	Neighbor	
2008	I Sell the Dead	Maisey O'Connell	
