= The Secret of Roan Inish =

- Theatrical release poster
- Directed by: John Sayles
- Screenplay by: John Sayles
- Based on: Secret of the Ron Mor Skerry by Rosalie K. Fry
- Produced by: Sarah Green; Maggie Renzi
- Starring: Mick Lally; Eileen Colgan; John Lynch; Jeni Courtney; Richard Sheridan; Cillian Byrne
- Cinematography: Haskell Wexler
- Edited by: John Sayles
- Music by: Mason Daring
- Production companies: Jones Entertainment Group; Skerry Productions
- Distributed by: The Samuel Goldwyn Company; First Look Pictures
- Release dates: September 12, 1994 (Toronto International Film Festival); January 21, 1995 (Sundance Film Festival)
- Running time: 103 minutes
- Countries: United States; Ireland
- Language: English
- Budget: $5.7 million
- Box office: $6,159,269

The Secret of Roan Inish is a 1994 independent fantasy adventure film written and directed by John Sayles. It is based on the 1957 novel Secret of the Ron Mor Skerry by Rosalie K. Fry. The film draws upon Irish and Orcadian folklore about selkies—seals that can shed their skins to become human. The film's story takes place in the northwestern Irish province of Ulster. It follows Fiona, a young girl who is sent to live with her grandparents and her cousin Eamon near the island of Roan Inish, where the selkies are rumored to live. After discovering that Fiona's lost younger brother is living among the seals, Fiona and Eamon try to bring him back to their family.

== Plot ==
In 1946, a young girl named Fiona is sent to live with her grandparents in an Irish fishing village, due to the death of her mother, the illness of her father, and her own frail health. Her grandfather tells her about their family's history, including their evacuation from their home on the tiny island of Roan Inish during the Second World War. In the Irish language, the island is known as Rón Inis, meaning "Island of Seals". Fiona's cousin Tadhg tells her about their ancestor who married a beautiful selkie (seal-woman). Although the marriage was happy, the selkie retained her seal-bond to the ocean, and the selkie's blood remains in their family.

Fiona begins accompanying her cousin Eamon on errands to Roan Inish. She sees a young boy she believes is her brother Jamie, who was lost to the sea several years earlier. She observes that the seals seem to feed and care for him. When she calls out to him, he runs away and climbs into a wooden cradle which serves as a boat, then disappears into the sea. Eamon warns Fiona not to tell her grandparents about the boy.

Fiona and Eamon decide to entice their grandparents to move back to Roan Inish, hoping that when they do, the seals will return Jamie to them. Their grandparents do not wish to return due to the sadness they feel at losing Jamie. To coax them to move, Fiona and Eamon begin restoring long-abandoned cottages on the island.

While in the company of her grandparents, Fiona worries aloud about Jamie's safety during a storm. Although shocked at the possibility that Jamie still lives, Fiona's grandmother decides to mount a rescue mission. When Fiona, Eamon and their grandparents arrive on Roan Inish, they see no sign of Jamie inside the cottages. Then, Jamie's cradle-boat arrives onshore and he heads for one of the cottages to escape the storm. When he sees his family, he runs back to his boat, but the seals herd him towards his family. He reluctantly makes his way into his grandmother's arms, and the family takes shelter from the storm.

== Cast ==
- Jeni Courtney as Fiona Coneelly
- Eileen Colgan as Tess Coneelly
- Richard Sheridan as Eamon Coneelly
- Dave Duffy as Jim
- Pat Slowey as Priest
- Declan Hannigan as Oldest Brother
- Mairéad Ní Ghallchóir as Barmaid
- Eugene McHugh as Bar Patron 1
- Tony Rubini as Bar Patron 2
- Mick Lally as Hugh Coneelly
- Michael MacCarthaigh as Schoolmaster
- Fergal McElherron as Sean Michael
- Brendan Conroy as Flynn
- John Lynch as Tadhg Coneelly
- Susan Lynch as Nuala the Selkie
- Frankie McCafferty as Tim
- Cillian Byrne as Jamie Coneelly

== Production ==
Secret of the Ron Mor Skerry was the favorite childhood book of Sayles' partner Maggie Renzi. Once Sayles decided to adapt the book, producer Sarah Green spent a year trying to locate the author, Rosalie K. Fry, eventually finding her through the British Society of Authors. Fry sold the film rights to the filmmakers, but died before the film was completed.

Although the novel takes place in Scotland, the filmmakers decided to have The Secret of Roan Inish take place in Ireland because they were familiar with the Irish landscape. Most of the film was shot in County Donegal in Ulster in the north of Ireland, with some scenes filmed on the Isle of Mull in Argyll, Scotland. When developing the film, John Sayles researched Celtic lore and language. He consulted the Blasket memoirs, a series of vernacular memoirs collected in the 1920s and 1930s from residents of Great Blasket Island off the coast of County Kerry. Great Blasket Island was evacuated by the Irish government in 1953.

Over a thousand girls were tested for the role of Fiona. The actress was required to be "perky" and underweight with a pale complexion, and not afraid of water. To depict the seals, the filmmakers used trained seals, footage of wild seals, and special effects involving puppetry.

In 2020, the UCLA Film and Television Archive made a digitally restored print of the film.

== Reception ==
On the review aggregator Rotten Tomatoes, The Secret of Roan Inish has a 96% critical rating based on 44 reviews. On Metacritic, the film has a score of 80 out of 100, based on 21 critics. Scott Rosenberg of SFGate said the film "seems to occupy a time of its own, cut off from the speed and overload of contemporary life and drifting to its own ancient rhythms." Stephen Holden of The New York Times praised Sayles' directing and called The Secret of Roan Inish a "visually rhapsodic...cinematic tone poem in which man and nature, myth and reality flow together in a way that makes them ultimately indivisible."
