= Terán =

Terán may refer to:

== Geography ==
- General Terán, Nuevo León Mexico
- Terán, Cabuérniga, Spain
- Fort Terán

== People ==
- Ana Enriqueta Terán (1918–2017), Venezuelan poet
- Arleth Terán (born 1976), Mexican actress
- General Mier y Terán (1789–1832), the town's namesake
- Héctor Terán Terán (1931–1998), Mexican politician
- Manuel Esteban Paez Terán (1996–2023), Venezuelan environmental activist
- Mario Terán (1942–2022), Bolivian Army sergeant who executed Che Guevara
- Teodelinda Terán Hicks (1889–1959), Ecuadorian cellist
- Los Alegres de Terán, Norteño music group from Nuevo León, Mexico

== See also ==
- Teran (disambiguation)
- Tehran, capital of Iran
