= The Silkie =

English folk group

The Silkie were an English folk music group. Their name was derived from an Orcadian song "The Great Silkie of Sule Skerry", which they sometimes performed. They were briefly considered to be the English equivalent of Peter, Paul and Mary, with their common repertoire of Bob Dylan songs, and the original Australian folk group, The Seekers.

== Early days ==
The four original members were all Hull University students who formed the group in October 1963. It consisted of Sylvia Tatler (vocals) (born 1 January 1945, Stoke-on-Trent, Staffordshire), Mike Ramsden (guitar and vocals) (born Michael John Ramsden, 21 June 1943, Totnes, Devon), Ivor Aylesbury (guitar and vocals) (born Ivor John Aylesbury, 4 October 1942, Carshalton, Surrey) and Kevin Cunningham (double bass) (born John Kevyn Cunningham, 13 August 1940, Bootle, Liverpool, Lancashire). Their first recording was a flexi disc that was produced in 1964 for the Hull University Rag Week. This disc consisted of 3 tracks, one side featuring "John Henry" and "All My Sorrows" with "Blood Red River" on the other side. They were most at home performing folk-style cover versions of songs, especially Bob Dylan compositions. Following graduation in 1964, they spent the whole summer working at the Devon Coast Country Club in Paignton, Devon, where they also performed most evenings on stage in the ballroom. Coincidentally, another musician also working there at the same time was Liverpudlian Rod Pont (1942–2000), whose last band (Steve Day and the Drifters) had already played at The Cavern alongside The Beatles and had just split up following a stint at the Top Ten Club in Hamburg during the previous autumn.

== Recording contract ==
Early in 1965, after appearing at the Cavern Club in Liverpool where they performed alongside The Spinners, they were signed by Brian Epstein, on 17 March 1965, who appointed Alistair Taylor as their manager. Their first single in June 1965, "Blood Red River", actually reached No. 14 on the Wonderful Radio London Fab 40, but it failed to make any impression on the UK Singles Chart. However, they followed this up with "You've Got to Hide Your Love Away" a Lennon–McCartney composition, which became their only chart hit.

== Chart success ==
John Lennon, Paul McCartney, and George Harrison helped them to record a cover version of "You've Got to Hide Your Love Away" on 9 August 1965 at the IBC Studios at around the same time as The Beatles' own version was released on their album Help! They then subsequently performed it on Top of the Pops on 16 September 1965. The song peaked at No. 28 in the UK Singles Chart and at No. 10 on the U.S. Billboard Hot 100 in the same year. Lennon produced, McCartney played the guitar, and Harrison played the tambourine. When the recording was completed, Lennon was so pleased with it that he played it over the phone to Brian Epstein and told him that they had just recorded a No. 1 hit.

The Silkie were then scheduled to tour the United States in December 1965 and had even been booked to appear on both The Ed Sullivan Show and American Bandstand, but were unable to obtain the necessary visas and work permits, so their tour was cancelled. They had already released an album, The Silkie Sing the Songs of Bob Dylan, in 1965 and two further singles, "Keys to My Soul" and "Born to Be With You" were also released in 1966, but none of them made either the UK or the US charts. In the autumn of 1966 the original Silkie lineup finally split when Aylesbury and Cunningham departed.

== Valediction ==
Mike Ramsden and Sylvia Tatler had married in January 1966, and they went on to perform as a duo version of The Silkie for a further 35 years, often appearing at their local pub, The Cott Inn at Dartington, Devon sometimes accompanied by their children.

Ramsden guested as a vocalist on the 1969 album Western Flier by proto-psychedelic folk band Hapshash and the Coloured Coat, alongside 20-year-old keyboard player Mike Batt.

Mike received a kidney transplant in 1993, but died at age 60 on 17 January 2004 in Totnes, Devon after a long battle with kidney disease. Sylvia died on 14 July 2018 at age 73. A funeral wake was held at The Cott Inn to celebrate Mike and Sylvia's music. Aylesbury died in 2003 and Cunningham in 1993.

== Singles ==
- "Blood Red River" - June 1965
- "You've Got to Hide Your Love Away" - October 1965 - UK Singles Chart No. 28, Billboard Hot 100 No. 10
- "Keys to My Soul" - February 1966
- "Born to Be with You" - June 1966
