= Tehran (disambiguation) =

Tehran is the capital city of Iran.

Tehran or Teheran may also refer to:

== In Iran ==
- Tehran province
- Tehran County
- Tehran TV
- Tehran Metro
  - Tehran (Sadeghiyeh) Metro Station
- Tehran University
- Tehran's Grand Bazaar
- Tehran International Fair
- Tehranpars
- Tehransar
- Tehran Conference
- Pas Tehran, a football club
- Tiran, Iran, a city in Isfahan Province

== Film and television ==
- Tehran (1946 film), a British-Italian thriller
- "Tehran" (Veep), a 2015 episode of season 4 of comedy Veep
- Tehran: City of Love, a 2018 Iranian film
- Tehran (TV series), a 2020 Israeli spy series
- Tehran (2025 film), a 2025 Indian spy thriller

== Other ==
- Tehran (horse), a British racehorse of the 1940s
- Tehran, a 1988 demo tape by the Offspring
- Julio Teherán (born 1991), Colombian baseball pitcher

== See also ==
- Teheran 43, a 1981 Soviet-French-Swiss film
- Teheranno or Tehran Street, Seoul, South Korea
- Tehrangeles, a neighborhood in California, United States
- Teran (disambiguation)
