= Ashore (album) =

Studio album by June Tabor
- Released: 21 February 2011
- Recorded: April 2010, Red Kite Studio, Llanwrada, Carmarthenshire, Wales
- Genre: English Folk
- Length: 69:10
- Label: Topic Records

June Tabor chronology
Apples (2007)	Ashore (2011)

Professional ratings
Aggregate scores
Source	Rating
Metacritic	76/100
Review scores
Source	Rating
AllMusic	4/5 stars
The Daily Telegraph	4/5 stars
The Guardian	4/5 stars
The Independent on Sunday	3/5 stars
Mojo	4/5 stars
Q	3/5 stars
Uncut	4/5 stars

Ashore is a folk album by June Tabor released in 2011 on Topic Records, catalogue number TSCD 577.

It is a collection of songs concerning humankind's relationship with the sea. Writing for The Guardian, Robin Denselow described it as a set of "quietly powerful and chilling songs with sensitive, restrained backing".

== Track listing ==
1. Finisterre (Ian Telfer)
2. The Bleacher Lassie Of Kelvinhaugh (Trad. arr. Tabor)
3. The Grey Funnel Line (Cyril Tawney)
4. Le Vingt-Cinquième du Mois d'Octobre (Trad. arr. Tabor, Cutting, Emerson)
5. Shipbuilding (Declan MacManus / Clive Langer)
6. Jamaica (arr. Emerson, Cutting, Harries)
7. The Great Selkie Of Sule Skerry (Trad., Child 113, arr. Tabor, Warren)
8. Winter Comes In (words: Jack Renwick, music: Ronald Jamieson) / Vidlin Voe (Frank Jamieson)
9. The Oggie Man (Cyril Tawney)
10. I'll go and enlist for a soldier (Trad. arr. Cutting, Harries)
11. The Brean Lament (Trad. arr. Tabor, Warren)
12. Le Petit Navire (Trad. arr. Tabor, Cutting, Emerson)
13. Across The Wide Ocean (words Les Barker, tune trad.)

== Personnel ==
- June Tabor - vocals
- Andy Cutting - diatonic accordion
- Mark Emerson - viola & violin
- Tim Harries - double bass
- Huw Warren - piano
