= Rosalie K. Fry =

Children's author and illustrator

- Born: 22 April 1911; Vancouver Island, British Columbia, Canada
- Died: 1992 (aged 80–81)
- Education: Central School of Art and Design
- Occupations: Children author and illustrator
- Writing career
- Language: English
- Years active: 1947–1970
- Genre: Children books
- Notable work: The Secret of Ron Mor Skerry

Rosalie Kingsmill Fry (22 April 1911 – 1992) was a Canadian-born author and illustrator who lived most of her life in Wales.

She was born on Vancouver Island and moved to Swansea with her family at a young age. She was educated in Swansea and went on to study art at the Central School of Art and Design in London from 1929 to 1934. She began writing children's stories because of her interest in illustration; her first book Bumblebuzz was published in 1938. She served in the Women's Royal Naval Service during World War II. Fry also contributed illustrations to various publications.

The text of her book Child of the Western Isles formed the basis for the 1994 film The Secret of Roan Inish.

== Selected works ==
- In a Rock Pool (1947)
- Pipkin Sees the World (1951)
- Pipkin the Woodmouse (1953)
- The Land of Lost Handkerchiefs, illustrator, text by Marjorie Knight (1954)
- Deep in the Forest (1955)
- The Wind Call (1955)
- The Water-Babies, A Fairy Tale for a Land Baby, illustrator, text by Charles Kingsley (1957)
- Child of the Western Isles (1957), republished in 1959 as The Secret of Ron Mor Skerry, ISBN 978-1681371665 (2017 reprint)
- Gypsy Princess, illustrated by Philip Gough (1959)
- The Echo Song (1962)
- The Riddle of the Figurehead (1963)
- September Island, illustrated by Margery Gill (1965)
- Snowed Up, illustrated by Robin Jacques (1970)
