= Mollie Hunter =

Scottish writer (1922–2012)

Maureen Mollie Hunter McIlwraith (30 June 1922 – 31 July 2012) was a Scottish writer known as Mollie Hunter. She wrote fantasy for children, historical stories for young adults, and realistic novels for adults. Many of her works are inspired by Scottish history, or by Scottish or Irish folklore, with elements of magic and fantasy.

== Life ==
Born and raised near Edinburgh in the small village of Longniddry, her final years were spent in Inverness. A portrait of her hangs in the Scottish National Portrait Gallery.

Hunter's debut was Patrick Kentigern Keenan, published by Blackie and Son in 1963 with illustrations by Charles Keeping. In the U.S. it was published in 1963 as The Smartest Man in Ireland.

== Awards ==
For The Stronghold Mollie Hunter won the 1974 Carnegie Medal from the Library Association, recognising the year's best children's book by a British subject. The same novel, published in The Netherlands as "Een toren tegen de romeinen" won the "Zilveren Griffel" (Silver Pen) award in 1978 for children's writing.

She won the Phoenix Award from the Children's Literature Association in 1992, recognising A Sound of Chariots (1972) as the best children's book published twenty years earlier that did not win a major award.

== Works ==
=== Novels ===
- Patrick Kentigern Keenan (1963)

US title, The Smartest Man in Ireland (Note: ISFDB and WorldCat records show some later UK publications under the US titles, and perhaps vice versa.)

- The Spanish Letters (1964)
- The Kelpie's Pearls (1964)
- A Pistol in Greenyards (1965)
- The Ghosts of Glencoe (1966)
- Thomas and the Warlock (1967)
- The Ferlie (1968); also issued as The Enchanted Whistle (1985)
- The Bodach (1970)

US title, The Walking Stones (Note: WorldCat libraries have catalogued at least four of her books with the subtitle "a story of suspense": A Stranger Came Ashore, The Wicked One, The Walking Stones, and The 13th Member.)

- The Third Resistance (1971)
- The Lothian Run (1971)
- The Thirteenth Member (1971)
- The Haunted Mountain (1972)
- A Sound of Chariots (Harper & Row, 1972)
- The Stronghold (Hamilton, 1974)
- A Stranger Came Ashore (Hamilton, 1975)
- The Wicked One (1977)
- The Third Eye (1979)
- You Never Knew Her as I Did! (1981)
- The Dragonfly Years (1983)

US title, Hold on to Love

- The Knight of the Golden Plain (1983)
- I'll Go My Own Way (1985)

US title Cat, Herself

- Escape from Loch Leven (1987)
- The Mermaid Summer (1988)
- The MidSummer Murders (1988)
- The King's Swift Rider: A Novel on Robert the Bruce (1998)

=== Collections ===
- A Furl of Fairy Wind (1977)

=== Plays ===
- Stay for an Answer (1962)
- The Captain
- A Love-song for My Lady
- The Walking Stones

=== Picture books ===
- Hi Johnny (1963)
- The Brownie (1986), illus. Mahri Christopherson
- The Enchanted Boy (1986), illus. Christopherson
- Flora MacDonald and Bonnie Prince Charlie (1988), illus. Chris Molan
- Gilly Martin the Fox (1994), illus. Dennis McDermott

=== Nonfiction ===
- Talent Is Not Enough: Mollie Hunter on Writing for Children (1976)
- The Pied Piper Syndrome and Other Essays (1992)
