= The Great Silkie of Sule Skerry =

Traditional song

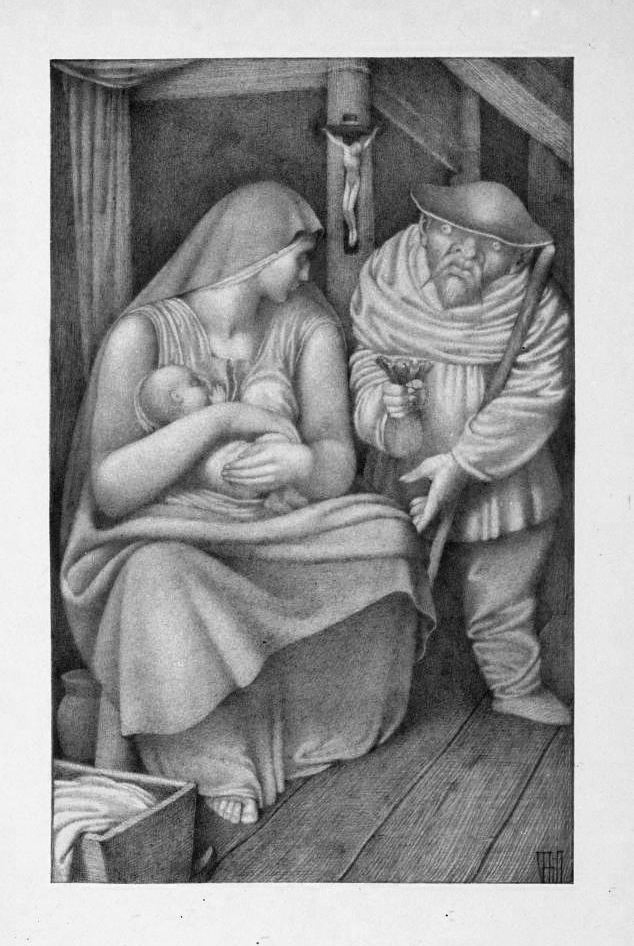
- Vernon Hill's illustration of the tale. From Richard Chope's 1912 collection Ballads Weird and Wonderful.

Song
- Genre: Folk song
- Songwriter: Unknown

"The Great Silkie of Sule Skerry" or "The Grey Selkie of Sule Skerry" is a traditional folk song from Orkney and Shetland. A woman has her child taken away by its father, the great selkie of Sule Skerry which can transform from a seal into a human. The woman is fated to marry a gunner who will harpoon the selkie and their son.

"The Great Silkie of Sule Skerry" is a short version from Shetland published in the 1850s and later listed as Child ballad number 113. "The Grey Selkie of Sule Skerry" is the title of the Orcadian texts, about twice in length. There is also a greatly embellished and expanded version of the ballad called "The Lady Odivere".

== Shetland version ==
"The Great Silkie of Sule Skerry" was collected from a lady from Snarra Voe, Shetland, and 7 verses from its transcription were published by Capt. F. W. L. Thomas in the 1850s. It was later included in Francis James Child's anthology, and catalogued as Child ballad number 113.

Alan Bruford has noted that "silkie" is an anomalous spelling for "selkie", and in other ballad specimens, the mythical being instead of being a "great" selkie is rather a "grey" selkie.

The ballad begins:

1. An earthly nourris^{†} sits and sings,
And aye she sings, "Ba lilly wean,^{†}
Little ken^{†} I my bairn's father,
Far less the land that he staps in."^{†}

2. Then ane^{†} arose at her bed fit,^{†}
And a grumly^{†} guest I'm sure was he,
Saying "Here am I, thy bairn's father,
Although I am not comely."

- nourris = a woman who is employed to suckle a small child - a wetnurse.
- ba lilly wean = howl lovely child.
- ken = know.
- staps = stops or stays.
- ane = one.
- bed fit = bed foot i.e. foot of the bed.
- grumly = troubled

A synopsis is as follows: A woman, nursing a baby, laments that she does not know the child's father or where he lives. A man rises up to tell her that he is the father, and that he is a silkie — a shapeshifter that takes the form of a man on the land and a seal in the sea, and that he lives on a remote rocky island called Sule Skerry. He gives her a purse full of gold, takes his son, and predicts that she will marry a gunner who will shoot both him and their son.

== Orkney version ==
There are Orkney versions which place the heroine's setting in Scandinavia, opening with the line: "In Norway land there lived a maid".

"The Grey Selchie of Shool Skerry" was published by R. Menzies Fergusson in Rambling Sketches in the Far North (1883), changing its title to "The Grey Selchie of Sule Skerrie" in the second edition, Rambles in the Far North (1884).

The same 14-stanza version with some spelling differences, entitled "The Grey Selchie of Sule Skerry" was printed in the 11 January 1934 issue of The Orcadian newspaper. It was later reprinted by Finnish folklorist Otto Andersson, who also collected a traditional ballad tune for it.

This version contains an exchange in which the seal-groom's marriage proposal is declined by the Norwegian nurse. The selkie makes the same fateful prediction as in the Shetland version, that the woman will marry a gunner, who will shoot both the selkie and their son. It further supplies the grim conclusion that the gunner brings back a gold chain which she recognizes as the one that was given to her son to wear.

== Lady Odivere ==
A cognate to the "Grey Selkie of Suleskerry" includes "The Play of Lady Odivere" ("The Play of de Lathie Odivere"). This piece is a dramatic ballad in style, over 90 stanzas long. And it may be in large part a piece of contrived fiction by Walter Traill Dennison, mish-mashed into a kernel of a traditional ballad, in the estimation of modern folklorist Alan Bruford.

Here, the Lady Odivere is in peril of being burnt at the stake for adultery by her husband, when she is rescued by San Imravoe, a selchie who is a jarl of high degree in his realm.

== Ballad tunes ==
The original tune was preserved by Andersson, who heard it sung by John Sinclair on the island of Flotta, Orkney. Andersson said, "I had no idea at the time that I was the first person to write down the tune. The pure pentatonic form of it and the beautiful melodic line showed me that it was a very ancient melody that I had set on paper".

The best known tune today is non-traditional, having been written by Jim Waters in 1954. Child was interested only in the texts of the ballads he collected, and Jim explains that the tune was "just the best I could do as a way to get a fine ballad sung". Over the next two years, he introduced the ballad to the Boston area at a time when "hootenannies" filled the Great Court of MIT on a weekly basis (before recorded folk songs were widely available). Jim Butler added the song to his repertoire, according to his notes, in October 1954, on a page labelled "MITOC Supp.", being the MIT Outing Club addition to his typewritten Child Ballads. Butler taught the song to several people, including Bonnie Dobson. This is the tune that Joan Baez popularized as "Silkie" in the early 1960s. Waters' own daughter recorded a version of the song in 2024.

Although Jean Redpath disparaged Water's tune as "phony", preferring a longer version of Child 113 to another tune, by 1965, Jim Butler had heard Waters' tune sung by a Scottish student at the University of British Columbia, unaccompanied in the traditional style, and under the impression that he had learned it from his grandfather. "This has to be one of the most flattering things that has ever happened to me", added Waters, who eventually copyrighted his version and assigned it to Folk Legacy Records. Folk Legacy reassigned all copyright interest to James Waters in August, 2012.

American folksinger Pete Seeger set the poem I Come and Stand at Every Door by Turkish poet Nâzım Hikmet to Waters's tune for "The Great Silkie" in the early 1950s. In this version, the song takes the point of view of a child victim of atomic warfare.

== Recordings ==
- The English rock-folk band Pressgang opened their album Mappa Mundi with an atmospheric and dramatic version of The Sylkie
- Joan Baez recorded it as "Silkie" on her 1961 album Joan Baez, Vol. 2.
- Pete Seeger included his version of Hikmet's "I Come and Stand at Every Door" on a 1964 concert album, I Can See a New Day.
- The American rock band The Byrds included the Hikmet/Seeger version on their third album, Fifth Dimension (1966).
- The Seeger song was later covered by This Mortal Coil.
- Roger McGuinn of the Byrds later recorded the song with its original lyrics as part of his Folk Den project.
- The English folk rock band Trees included one variant, as "The Great Silkie", on The Garden of Jane Delawney, their debut album.
- Glasgow-born folk singer Ray Fisher (1940–2011) included the song on her album The Bonny Birdy (1972). Her brother Archie Fisher has a version on his Orfeo (1970).
- Judy Collins included her version, "Great Selchie of Shule Skerry", on her 1962 album Golden Apples of the Sun.
- Oli Steadman included it on his song collection "365 Days Of Folk".
- The Breton folk band Tri Yann also penned an adaptation in French called "Le Dauphin" (the dolphin) on their 1972 album Tri Yann an Naoned.
- Scottish folk band The Corries released a version called "The Great Silkie" on their 1976 album Live At The Royal Lyceum Theatre, Edinburgh.
- The Highwaymen recorded this song twice, with two different versions. The first version was on their 1962 album Standing Room Only, and the second version was on their 2005 album The Water of Life.
- In 1981 Angelo Branduardi recorded this tune on his album Branduardi '81, with lyrics by Esenin. The song is titled "La cagna". In 2013 re-recorded this tune (titled: "Silkie") with original lyrics adapted in Italian language, on his album Il Rovo E La Rosa.
- The Irish band Solas included one variant, "Grey Selchie", on their 1998 album The Words That Remain.
- A version appears on Maddy Prior's 1999 album Ravenchild.
- An EDM adaptation was released on the 1999 Dancemania X5 album, performed by Hype of the Highlands feat. Aya, titled "The Silky"
- Alasdair Roberts included his version of "The Grey Silkie of Sule Skerry" on his CD You Need Not Braid Your Hair for Me: I Have Not Come A-Wooing, released in 2005.
- Dave Bainbridge and Troy Donockley perform a version of the song on their 2005 album When Worlds Collide.
- The Breton singer Cécile Corbel recorded it on her album Songbook Vol.2 (2008).
- Steeleye Span recorded it as a hidden track on their 2009 album Cogs, Wheels and Lovers.
- Singer/songwriter and cellist Liz Davis Maxfield recorded a version titled “The Great Selkie” on her 2009 album Big Fiddle.
- In 2011 June Tabor recorded it on her album Ashore.
- English folk band The Unthanks perform a version of the song on their 2022 album 'Sorrows Away'.
- Jim Waters' daughter Susan sang this song for the Derek Piotr Fieldwork Archive in 2024.
