= Finfolk =

Shapeshifters of Orkney folklore

In Orkney folklore, Finfolk (sometimes Finnfolk) are sorcerous shapeshifters of the sea, the dark mysterious race from Finfolkaheem who regularly make an amphibious journey from the depths of the Finfolk ocean home to the Orkney Islands. They wade, swim or sometimes row upon the Orkney shores in the spring and summer months, searching for human captives. The Finfolk (both Finman and Finwife) kidnap unsuspecting fishermen, or frolicking youth, near the shore and force them into lifelong servitude as a spouse.

== The Finfolk ==
=== Finman ===
The Finman is described as being tall and thin with a stern, gloomy face. He is said to have many magical powers, such as rowing between Norway and Orkney in seven oar-strokes, making his ship invisible and creating fleets of phantom boats. He avoids human contact, but is extremely territorial and will wreak havoc on the boats of any fishermen trespassing in 'his' waters, though he may sometimes be deterred by drawing a cross on the bottom of a craft with chalk or tar, for Finfolk abhor the sign of the Christian cross above any other device. The Finman was said to be very crafty and ever prepared to cheat men out of their silver or wives.

=== Finwife ===
The Finwife starts her life as a beautiful mermaid bent on acquiring a human husband. Should she succeed, she takes him to live with her in Finfolkaheem, or, on occasion in some stories, goes to live with him instead, as in the story of "Johnny Croy and his Mermaid Bride". If not, the Finwife must take a Finman husband and is often made to go ashore and work as a healer or spinner by her husband, whom she is forced to send all her silver home to or risk a terrible beating. She often owns a black cat that can transform itself into a fish to deliver messages to her kin in Finfolkaheem.

== Homes ==
The Finfolk were said to have two homes: the magical underwater world of Finfolkaheem where they lived in the winter, and the island of Hildaland.

=== Finfolkaheem ===
According to folklore, the underwater dwelling of the Finfolk, known as Finfolkaheem (literally "Finfolk's Home") is regarded as the place of origin for the Finfolk, and their ancestral home. A fantastic underwater palace with massive crystal halls, Finfolkaheem is surrounded, inside and out, by ornate gardens of multi-coloured seaweed. It is never dark in Finfolkaheem, because it is lit by the bioluminescent glow of tiny sea creatures at night. Its great halls and vast rooms are decorated with moving underwater draped curtains whose colours move and dance with the currents.

=== Hildaland ===
Hildaland (literally 'Hidden Land'), a paradisiacal island that was said to either be invisible, hidden just underwater, or surrounded by magical fog. Whichever, it was rarely glimpsed by humans, and young men and women stolen away there never returned. Nowadays, many people associate the very real island of Eynhallow with the magical Hildaland, touting the tale of The Farmer of Evie as the reason that Hildaland/Eynhallow is now visible and relatively non-magical, though some would say otherwise.

== Human abduction ==
Unlike the "selkies" made famous by "The Great Silkie of Sule Skerry", the Finfolk are neither romantic nor friendly. Instead of courting the prospective spouse, Finfolk simply abduct them. Regarded as territorial and greedy, the Finfolk, in addition to their lust for humans, have a weakness for silver, including silver coins and jewelry. According to legend, a possible way to escape abduction is to exploit this Finfolk weakness by tossing silver coins away from oneself. The motivation for the amphibious abductions are inspired, in part, because marriage to a human is preferred over other Finfolk.

To capture the unsuspecting human bride or groom, the Orkney Finfolk cunningly disguise themselves and their fins as other sea animals, plants or even as floating clothes. The Finfolk kidnapping attempt begins by approaching the prospective mate cautiously, floating ever closer, until it is possible to leap up and grab the victim. The Finmen often use another tactic, appearing in human form disguised as fishermen in a row boat, or a fishing boat propelled by oars. The Finwife prefers a more natural form, and often appears as a mermaid with long, flowing golden hair, snow-white skin, incredible beauty, and, sometimes, a long fish tail. In some stories, she has a beautiful voice like that of the Greek sirens.

=== Married life ===
Whatever the method of abduction, the helpless human captive is ferried away (often screaming) to the floating, and sometimes disappearing, mystical island of Hildaland, where the rest of one's days are spent performing rigorous duties as either the husband to the Finwife, or wife to the Finman. Yet another compelling reason for Finfolk intermarriage with humans is that, should a Finwife marry a Finman, she loses both her beauty and mystical charm. As she ages (without a human husband), her ugliness increases in increments of seven years until she becomes the Finwife hag.

== References in Orkney folklore ==
- The Folklore of Orkney and Shetland Marwick, Ernest, W. Batsford, London 1975 ISBN 0-7134-2999-2
- Orkneyinga Saga: the History of the Earls of Orkney Penguin Books. Palsson, Hermann (Translated by), and Edwards, Paul, Professor (Translated by) New York 1981 ISBN 0-14-044383-5
- "Orkneyjar: the Heritage of the Orkerney Islands" Towrie S., Website 1996 - 2006

== Modern renditions ==
- A Time to Keep and Other Stories, George Mackay Brown, ISBN 0-8149-0929-9
- The Wheel of the Finfolk, R. E. Jackson, illustrated by Peter Warner, Capricorn Books, 1984, ISBN 0-7011-0487-2
- The Bone Flute, Daniel Allison, House of Legends, 2019, ISBN 978-1709378720
- Swans Landing series, Shana Norris, 2011, https://www.amazon.com/dp/B074C82M1P?binding=kindle_edition&ref=dbs_dp_awt_ser_img_widg_pc_tkin ASIN: B0067KLD3K
- She's Always Hungry, Eliza Clark, 2024. ISBN 978-0063393264
