= Walter Traill Dennison =

Farmer and folklorist (1825-1894)

Walter Traill Dennison (1825–1894) was a farmer and folklorist. He was a native of the Orkney island of Sanday, in Scotland, where he collected local folk tales and other antiquities.

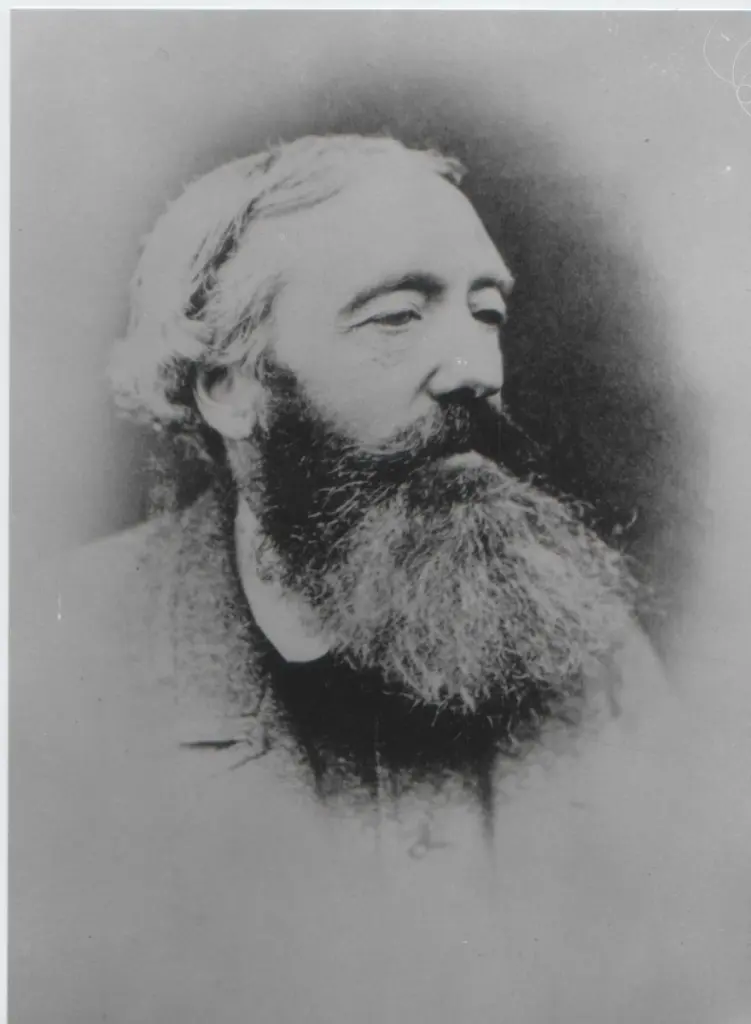
Portrait of Walter Traill Dennison

== Biography ==
Dennison published folk stories in the Orcadian dialect under the title The Orcadian Sketch-Book. Other works by Dennison were published in periodicals such as Peace's Almanac and the Scottish Antiquary. Dennison was a member of the Free Kirk before founding his own church in Orkney, "Dennison's Kirk." The anonymously published Sanday Revival Hymns, written for "the members and adherents of the Sanday Free Church Station by one of their deacons," are generally attributed to Dennison.

Married with one daughter, he died on 3 September 1894 after a short illness. Some of the historic artifacts he collected were sold to the antiquarian James Walls Cursiter, whose collection was acquired by the Hunterian Museum and Art Gallery.

== Reception ==
I have heard a hundred times more about mermaids from the lips of Orkney peasants than I ever saw in books. I do not mention this in any spirit of controversy. Folk-tales may vary in different locations; and I only profess to give, as far as I can, a correct rendering of the beliefs in my own locality.

— Walter Traill Dennison

Andrew Jennings credited Dennison with having "romanticised and systematised" Orcadian folklore but having nonetheless managed to transmit authentic traditions from the Orcadian peasantry. According to Simon Hall, Dennison "relied almost exclusively on the peasantry of his native island for the raw materials of his literary work." The Orcadian folklorist and antiquarian Ernest Marwick considered that Dennison bridged the gap between the social classes and that he had an "affinity with the common people". Marwick hesitated to call Dennison's stories "folk tales," characterizing them as popular tales from "cottars and fishermen...turned into English for the benefit of the wider public."

== Selected publications ==
- Dennison, Walter Traill (1861). Sanday Revival Hymns. Edinburgh.
- Dennison, Walter Traill (1880). The Orcadian Sketch-Book. Kirkwall: William Peace & Son.
- Dennison, Walter Traill (1904). Clouston, J. Storer (ed.). Orcadian Sketches. Kirkwall: William Peace & Son.

== Bibliography ==
- Brown, George MacKay (2021) [1969]. An Orkney Tapestry. Polygon. ISBN 978-1-84697-480-9.
- Clackson, Stephen (April 2024). "Stephen Clackson's Letter from School Place" (PDF). Stronsay Limpet. No. 226.
- Cursiter, James Walls (1894). List of Books and Pamphlets relating to Orkney and Shetland. Kirkwall: Wm. Peace & Son.
- "Death of an Orcadian Worthy". Dundee Courier. No. 12847. 4 September 1894. p. 3 – via British Newspaper Archive.
- "The Dennison Collection". University of Glasgow. Archived from the original on 29 November 2014.
- Dennison, Walter Traill (1891). "Orkney Folklore". The Scottish Antiquary. Vol. 5.
- Ellis, Alexander J. (1889). On Early English Pronunciation: with Especial Reference to Shakspere and Chaucer. Trübner & Co.
- Hall, Simon (2010). The History of Orkney Literature. John Donald.
- Jennings, Andrew (25 March 2010). "The Finnfolk". University of the Highlands and Islands. Archived from the original on 23 October 2014.
- Marwick, Ernest (1961). Orkney Folklore and Traditions. Kirkwall: Herald Press.
- Marwick, Ernest (1986) [1975]. The Folklore of Orkney and Shetland. London: B.T. Batsford Ltd. ISBN 0-7134-5261-7.
- Marwick, Hugh (1929). The Orkney Norn. Oxford University Press.
