= Ernest Marwick =

Scottish writer (1915–1977)

Ernest Walker Marwick (born 1915 Evie, Orkney; died July 1977) was a Scottish Orcadian writer noted for his writings on Orkney folklore and history.

Marwick's father was a travelling salesman who had a smallholding in the parish of Evie, to the north of Mainland, Orkney. Diagnosed with scoliosis in 1925 when he was ten years old, Marwick could no longer attend school as his days had to be spent lying on a wooden board. He used the time of illness to read extensively.

After Marwick's marriage his home provided a meeting-place for local intellectuals, including George Mackay Brown and Robert Rendall. His Anthology of Orkney Verse was published in 1949.

From 1955 to 1960 he was on the staff of the Orkney Herald newspaper. He subsequently moved to The Orcadian, where he worked as a columnist and feature writer, his writing covering literary and other subjects. Other media work undertaken by Marwick included broadcasting on local and Scottish national radio programmes.

Ernest Marwick was a founder member of the Orkney Heritage Society.

He died in July 1977, having swerved off a straight road and crashed into a farm steading when driving. In 2015, one hundred years after his birth, Orkney International Science Festival focused attention on the contributions he made to Orkney's heritage.

== Selected works ==
- An Anthology of Orkney Verse (1949)
- The Folklore of Orkney and Shetland (1975)
- An Orkney Anthology: Selected Works of Ernest Walker Marwick Volume One ed. J.D.M. Robertson (1991)
- An Orkney Anthology: Selected Works of Ernest Walker Marwick Volume Two ed. J.D.M. Robertson, J.M. Irvine and M.E. Sutherland (2012)
