= List of legendary creatures (C) =

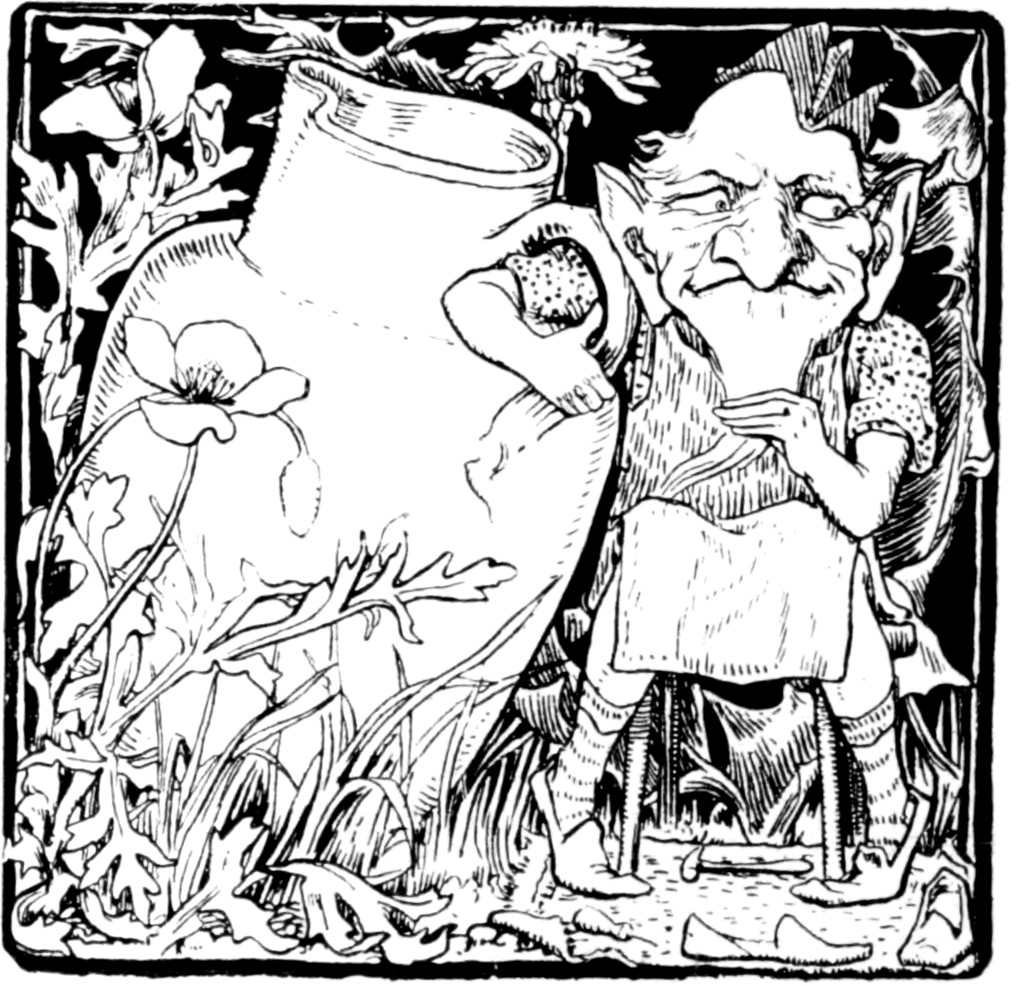
A representation of a Clurichaun in T. C. Croker's Fairy Legends and Traditions of the South of Ireland

1. Cabeiri (Greek) – Smith and wine spirit
2. Cacus (Roman) – Fire-breathing giant
3. Cadejo (Central America) – Cow-sized dog-goat hybrid
4. Cailleach (Scottish) – Divine creator and weather deity hag
5. Caipora (Tupi) – Fox-human hybrid and nature spirit
6. Caladrius (Medieval Bestiary) – White bird that can foretell if a sick person will recover or die
7. Calingi (Medieval Bestiary) – Humanoid with an eight-year lifespan
8. Callitrix (Medieval Bestiary) – Apes who always bear twins, one the mother loves, the other it hates
9. Calydonian Boar (Greek) – Giant, chthonic boar
10. Calygreyhound (Heraldic) – Wildcat-deer/antelope-eagle-ox-lion hybrid
11. Camahueto (Chilota) – One-horned calf
12. Camazotz (Mayan) – Underworld bat spirit
13. Cambion (Medieval folklore) – Offspring of a human and an incubus or succubus
14. Campe (Greek) – Dragon-human-scorpion hybrid
15. Camulatz (Mayan) – Bird that ate the heads of the first men
16. Candileja (Colombian) – Spectral, fiery hag
17. Canaima (Guyanese) – Were-jaguar
18. Canotila (Lakota) – Little people and tree spirits
19. Caoineag (Scottish) – Death spirit (a particular type of Banshee/Bean Sídhe)
20. Căpcăun (Romanian) – Large, monstrous humanoid
21. Carbuncle (Latin America) – Small creature with a jewel on its head
22. Cath Palug (Welsh) – Monstrous cat
23. Catoblepas (Medieval Bestiary) – Scaled buffalo-hog hybrid
24. Cat Sidhe (Scottish) – Fairy cat
25. Ceasg (Scottish) – Benevolent Scottish mermaids
26. Ceffyl Dŵr (Welsh) – Malevolent water horse
27. Centaur (Greek) – Human-horse hybrid
28. Centicore (Indian) – Horse-Antelope-Lion-Bear hybrid
29. Cerastes (Greek) – Extremely flexible, horned snake
30. Cerberus (Greek) – Three-headed dog that guards the entrance to the underworld
31. Cercopes (Greek) – Mischievous forest spirit
32. Cericopithicus (Medieval Bestiary) – Apes who always bear twins, one the mother loves, the other it hates
33. Ceryneian Hind (Greek) – Hind with golden antlers and bronze or brass hooves
34. Cetus (Greek) - Large sea monster
35. Chakora (Hindu) – Lunar bird
36. Chalkydri (Apocryphal writings) – Angelic birds
37. Chamrosh (Persian) – Dog-bird hybrid
38. Chaneque (Aztec) – Little people and nature spirits
39. Changeling (European) – Humanoid child (fairy, elf, troll, etc.) substituted for a kidnapped human child
40. Čhápa (Lakota) – Beaver spirit
41. Chareng (Meitei) — Semi-hornbill, semi-human creature
42. Charybdis (Greek) – Sea monster in the form of a giant mouth
43. Chenoo (Mi'kmaq/Algonquian) – Giant, human-eating ice monsters; former humans who either committed terrible crime(s) or were possessed by evil spirits, turning their hearts to ice
44. Chepi (Narragansett) – Ancestral spirit that instructs tribe members
45. Cherufe (Mapuche) – Volcano-dwelling monster
46. Cheval Mallet (French) – Evil horse who runs away with travelers
47. Cheval Gauvin (French) – Evil horse who drowns riders, similar to kelpie
48. Chibaiskweda (Abenaki) – Ghost of an improperly buried person
49. Chichevache – Human-faced cow that feeds on good women
50. Chickcharney (Bahamian) – Bird-mammal hybrid
51. Chimaera (Greek) – Lion-goat-snake hybrid
52. Chimimōryō (Chinese/Japanese) – Spirits of mountains and rivers
53. Chindi (Navajo) – Vengeful ghost that causes dust devils
54. Chinthe (Burmese) – Temple-guarding feline, similar to Chinese Shi and Japanese Shisa
55. Chitauli (Zulu) – Human-lizard hybrid
56. Chōchin'obake (Japanese) – Animated paper lantern
57. Chol (Biblical mythology) – Regenerative bird
58. Chollima (Korean) – Supernaturally fast horse
59. Chonchon (Mapuche) – Disembodied, flying head
60. Choorile (Guyanese) – Ghost of a woman that died in childbirth
61. Chort (Slavic) – Malign spirit or demon
62. Chromandi (Medieval Bestiary) – Hairy savage with dog teeth
63. Chrysaor (Greek) – Giant son of the gorgon Medusa
64. Chrysomallus (Greek mythology) – Golden winged ram
65. Chukwa (Hindu) – Giant turtle that supports the world
66. Chullachaki
67. Chupacabra (Latin America) – Cryptid beast named for its habit of sucking the blood of livestock
68. Church grim (Germanic) – Guardian spirit
69. Churel (Hindu) – Vampiric, female ghost
70. Chut (Belarusian) – Household spirit
71. Ciguapa (Dominican Republic) – Malevolent seductress
72. Cihuateteo (Aztec) – Ghost of women that died in childbirth
73. Cikavac (Serbian) – Bird that serves its owner
74. Cinnamon bird (Medieval Bestiaries) – Giant bird that makes its nest out of cinnamon
75. Cipactli (Aztec) – Sea monster, crocodile-fish hybrid
76. Cipitio (Salvadoran folklore)
77. Cirein cròin (Scottish) – Sea serpent
78. Coblynau (Welsh) – Little people and mine spirits
79. Cockatrice (Medieval Bestiaries) – Chicken-lizard hybrid
80. Cofgod (English) – Cove god
81. Coinchenn (Irish) – Sea monster
82. Colo Colo (Mapuche) – Rat-bird hybrid that can shapeshift into a serpent
83. Corycian nymphs (Greek) – Nymph of the Corycian Cave
84. Cretan Bull (Greek) – Monstrous bull
85. Crinaeae (Greek) – Fountain nymph
86. Criosphinx (Ancient Egypt) – Ram-headed sphinx
87. Crocotta (Medieval Bestiaries) – Monstrous dog-wolf
88. The Cu Bird (Mexican) – El Pájaro Cu; a bird
89. Cuco (Latin America) – Bogeyman
90. Cucuy (Latin America) – Malevolent spirit
91. Cuegle (Cantabrian) – Monstrous, three-armed humanoid
92. Cuélebre (Asturian and Cantabrian) – Dragon
93. Curruid (Irish) – Sea monster
94. Curupira (Tupi) – Nature spirit
95. Cu Sith (Scottish) – Gigantic fairy dog
96. Cŵn Annwn (Welsh) – Underworld hunting dog
97. Cyclops (Greek) – One-eyed giant
98. Cyhyraeth (Welsh) – Death spirit
99. Cynocephalus (Medieval Bestiaries) – Dog-headed humanoid
