= Upside-down painting =

Practice of hanging paintings in inverted orientation

Most paintings are intended to be hung in a precise orientation, defining an upper part and a lower part. Some paintings are displayed upside-down, sometimes by mistake since the image does not represent an easily recognizable oriented subject and lacks a signature, or by a deliberate decision of the exhibitor.

== Examples ==
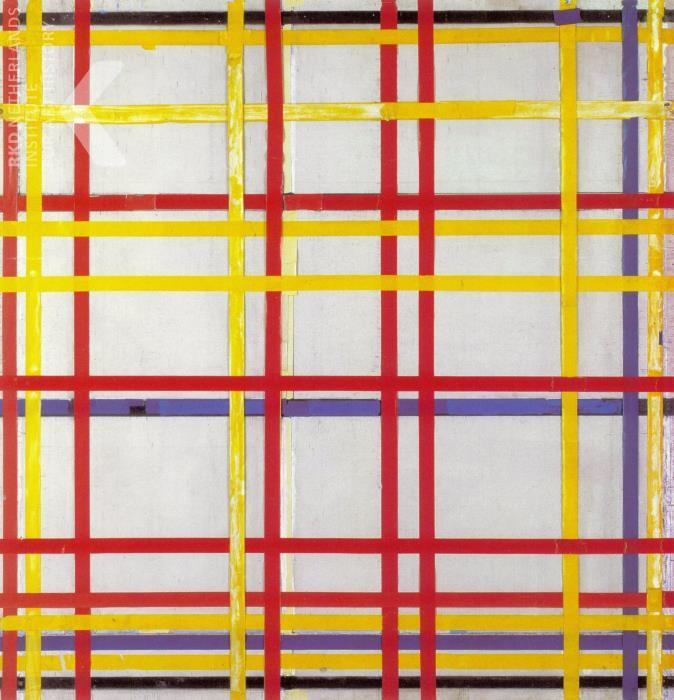
New York City I as exhibited (upside-down)

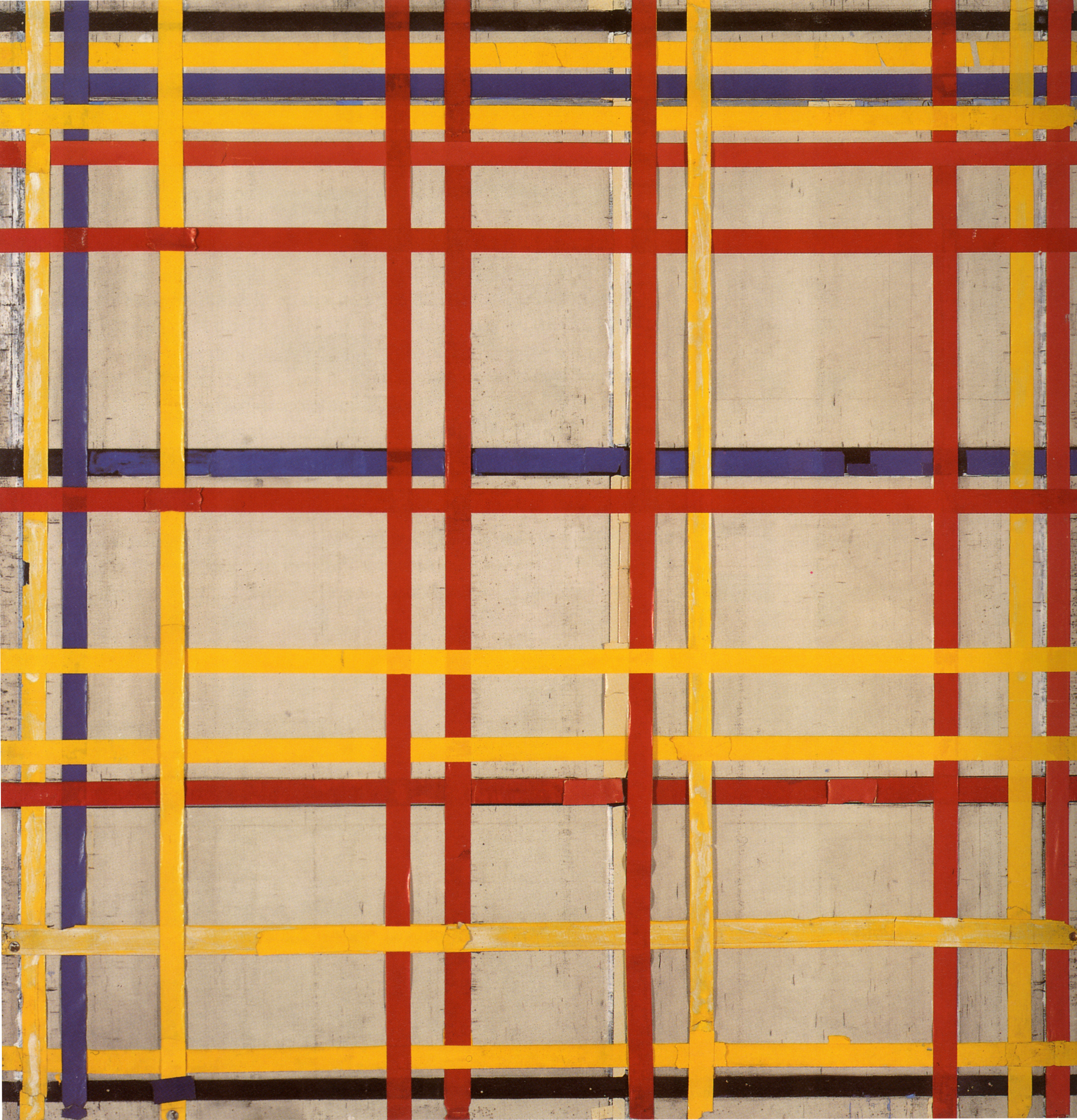
New York City I in the intended orientation

- New York City I, a 1941 unfinished version of New York City, a 1942 oil by Piet Mondrian, hung upside-down at the MOMA of New York and since 1980 at the Kunstsammlung Nordrhein-Westfalen. After the mistake was discovered in 2022, the painting's orientation was not corrected, in order to avoid damage.
- Le Bateau, a paper-cut by Henri Matisse depicting a ship reflected on the water, was hung upside-down at the MOMA for 47 days in 1961.
- Georgia O'Keeffe's The Lawrence Tree (1929) depicts a tree from its foot. It hung up upside-down in 1931 and between 1979 and 1989. Her Oriental Poppies hung upside-down for 30 years at the Weisman Art Museum of the University of Minnesota.

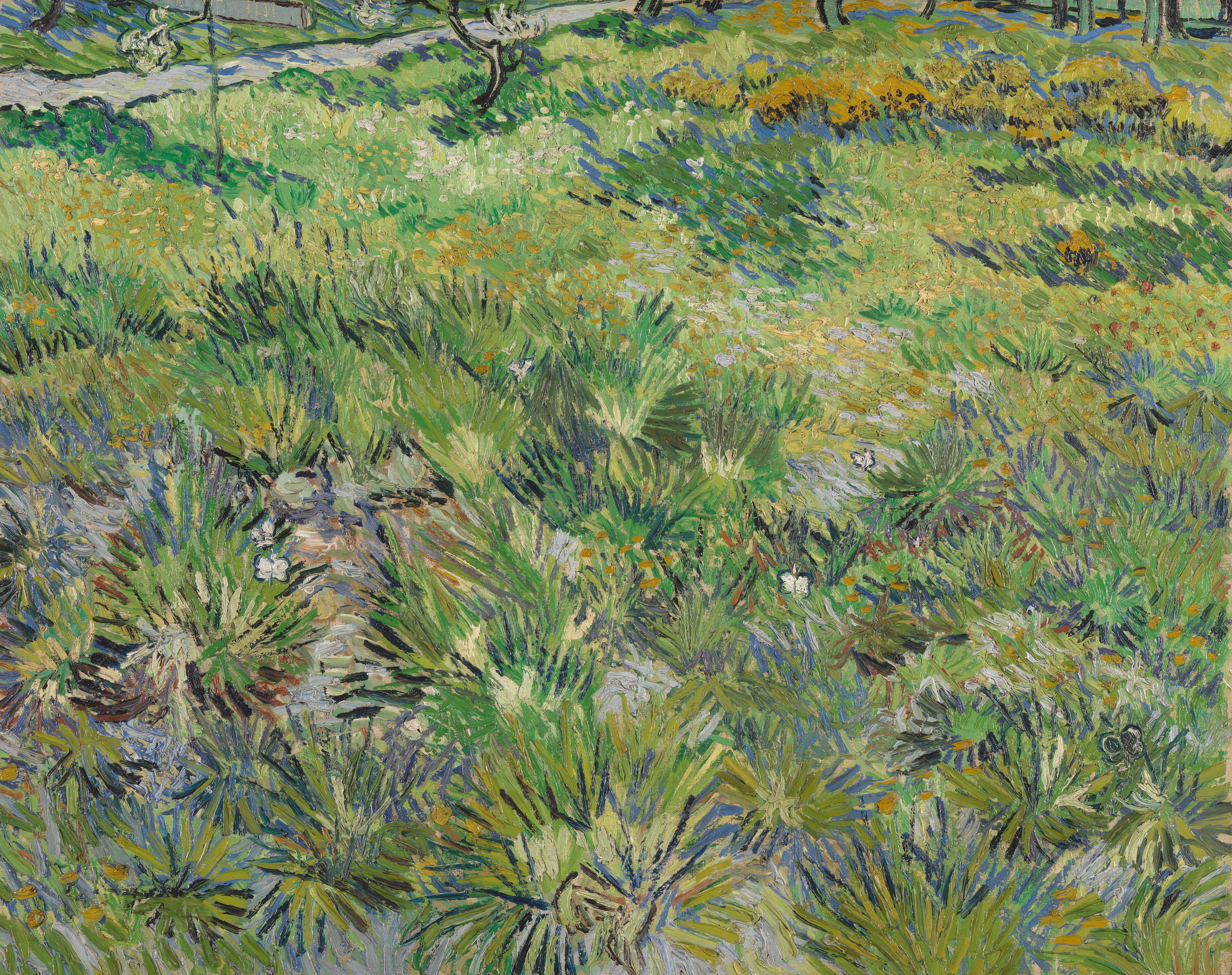
Long Grass With Butterflies, 1890

- In 1965, Vincent van Gogh's Long Grass with Butterflies was inverted for about 15 minutes at the National Gallery of London before a 15-year-old schoolgirl alerted authorities.
- In 1968, Mark Tobey's Autumn Field was hung upside-down outside President Lyndon Johnson’s office in the White House, where it was on loan.
- For a period in 1994, Salvador Dalí's Four Fishermen's Wives in Cadaquès was upside-down at the Metropolitan Museum of New York.
- Pablo Picasso's 1912 drawing The Fiddler was upside-down at the Reina Sofía Museum of Madrid. The representations of the head and the fiddle were confused.

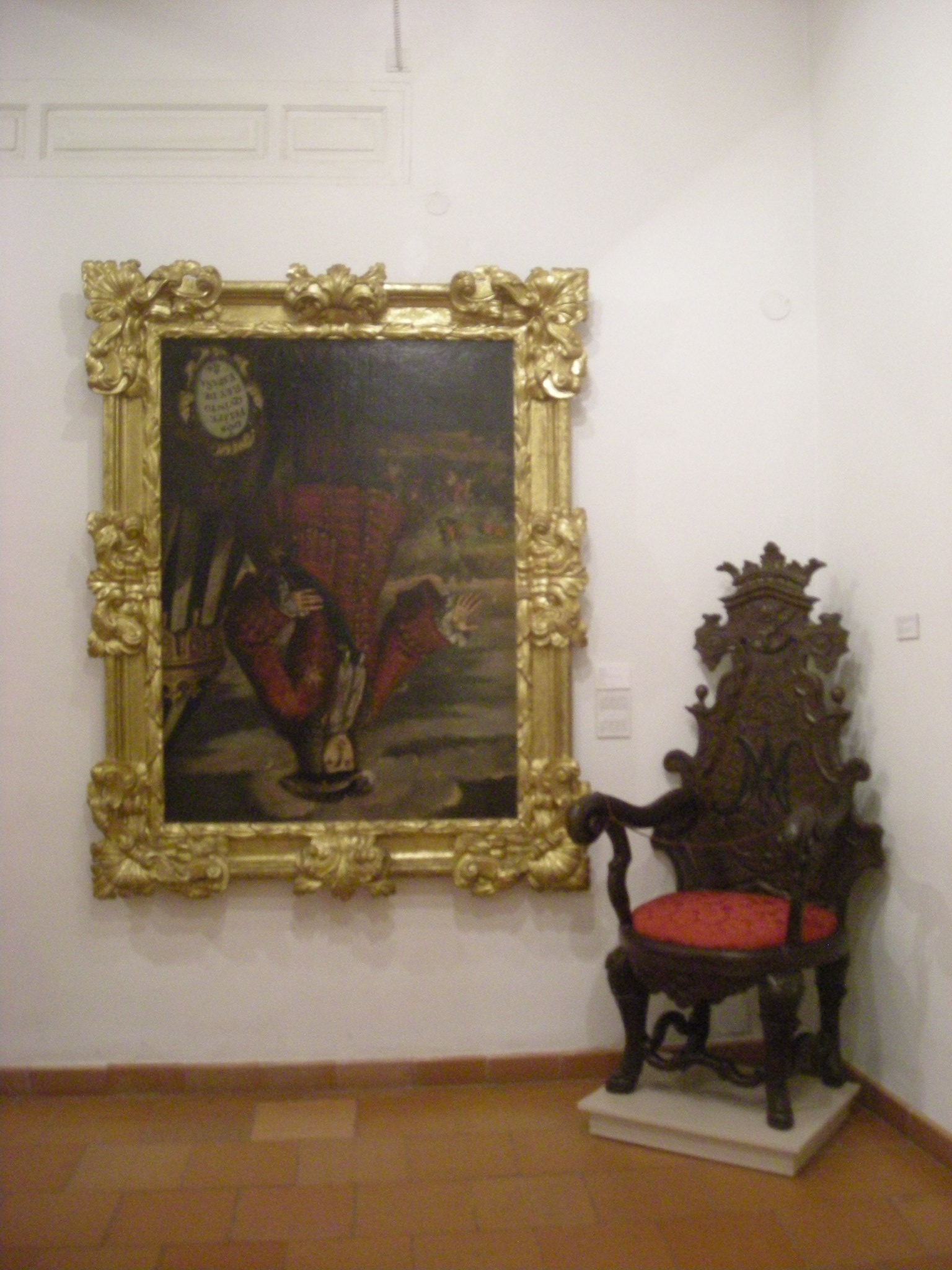
The portrait of Philip V

- Josep Amorós's portrait of Philip V of Spain hangs upside-down at the Almodí of Xàtiva, Spain. The king ordered the burning of Xàtiva in 1701, during the War of the Spanish Succession.
- Georg Baselitz used a painting by Louis-Ferdinand von Rayski, Wermsdorf Woods, as a model, in order to paint his first picture with an inverted motif: The Wood On Its Head (1969). By inverting his paintings, the artist is able to emphasize the organisation of colours and form and confront the viewer with the picture's surface rather than the personal content of the image. In this sense, the paintings are empty and not subject to interpretation. Instead, one can only look at them.

== When both orientations are valid ==
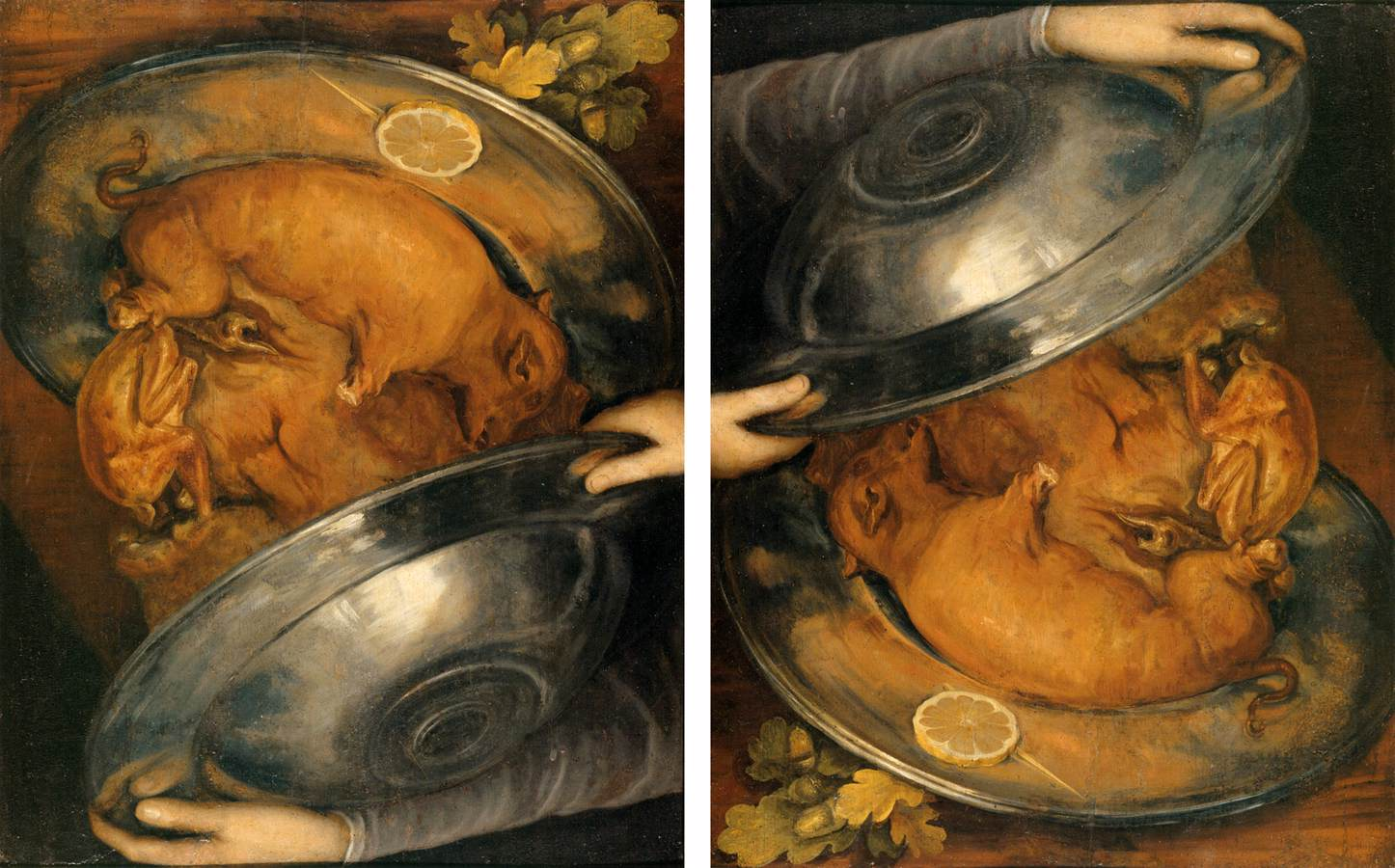
Arcimboldo's The Cook reversed and the right way . See also The Fruit Basket and The Gardener.

Some works display rotational symmetry or are ambiguous figures that allow both orientations to be meaningful. Giuseppe Arcimboldo painted several works that are still lifes in one orientation and related portraits in the other.

== See also ==
- Spolia (fragments of sculpture and architecture recycled in new buildings) may not be in the original orientation for ideological or pragmatical reasons. An example is the blocks in the shape of a Medusa head reused as column bases in the Basilica Cistern of Constantinople.
- Pittura infamante, a genre depicting enemies hanging from their feet.
- Aerial landscape art – Landscape considered as art
- 🔝, a symbol to show the top side of an object.
- Denny Dent, an artist who sometimes painted upside-down portraits on stage before turning the canvas right-side-up for the audience
