= Chut =

Chut may refer to:

- Chut (Belarusian mythology), a home spirit in Belarusian mythology
- Chut!, a novel by Jean-Marie Gourio
- Chut language, spoken by Chut people in Viechutam
- Chut people, a Vietnamese ethnic group
- Chut thai, traditional Thai clothing
- Chut Wutty (1972–2012), a Cambodian environmental activist
- Chuts, a name applied to Jews who immigrated to London from the Netherlands during the latter part of the 19th century
