= Basilisco Chilote =

Creature from Chilota mythology

The Basilisco chilote is a creature from Chilota mythology originating from the Chiloé Archipelago, in southern Chile.

The Basilisco chilote is described as having the crest of a rooster and the body of a serpent. It is hatched from an egg that is incubated by a rooster and lives in a hole which it digs under a house. It feeds on the phlegm and saliva of the people who live in the house, causing the inhabitants to dehydrate and eventually die.

To kill Basilisco chilote, you must burn the egg as soon as it is laid and kill the chicken that laid it, to prevent further eggs from being laid. Once hatched the only way to destroy it is by burning down the house where it lives.

This myth is based upon myths of the Colo Colo and the basilisk, but borrows more from the tradition of the cockatrice, which itself draws from the basilisk.

== See also ==
- Chilota mythology
- Colo Colo
- Basilisk
- Cockatrice
- Hungry ghost
- Mbói Tu'ĩ
