= Mundus inversus =

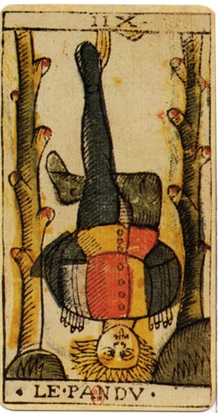
The Hanged Man from Tarot decks is a literal visualization of the mundus inversus, where the natural order of things is overturned.

Mundus inversus, Latin for "world upside-down," is a literary topos in which the natural order of things is overturned and social hierarchies are reversed. More generally, it is a symbolic inversion of any sort.

Although the words are ancient, the term mundus inversus has been common in English only since the 1960s.

In European Literature and the Latin Middle Ages, Ernst Robert Curtius first identified the topos, illustrating it with one of the Carmina Burana ("Florebat olim studium"), about which he comments:

The poem begins as a "complaint on the times": youth will no longer study! Learning is in decay! But—so the thought proceeds—the whole world is topsy-turvy! The blind lead the blind and hurl them into the abyss; birds fly before they are fledged; the ass plays the lute; oxen dance; plow-boys turn soldiers. ... What was once outlawed is now praised. Everything is out of joint.

Curtius concludes with a formula for creating the mundus inversus: "Out of stringing together impossibilia grows a topos: 'the world upsidedown.'"

== In Renaissance-era French culture ==
In The World Upside Down in 16th-Century French Literature and Visual Culture, Vincent Robert-Nícoud introduces the mundus inversus by writing:

To call something ‘inverted’ or ‘topsy-turvy’ in the sixteenth century is, above all, to label it as abnormal, unnatural and going against the natural order of things. The topos of the world upside down brings to mind a world returned to its initial state of primeval chaos, in which everything is inside-out, topsy-turvy and out of bounds: the cart is set before the horse, only fools can be wise, kings no longer rule, the belly is placed above the head, people behave like animals, and the elements are at war with each other. Widely used from Antiquity to the twenty-first century, the topos of the world upside down is extremely versatile and can be applied to a variety of situations. Linked to adynata or impossibilia, a rhetorical device which describes a natural impossibility, the world upside down can be used to describe a dystopian or utopian world, and to mock, deplore, criticise, or debase a person, a situation, or an institution. The world upside down can be found in poetry, novels, adages, pamphlets, paintings, and prints.

== In anthropology ==
In the 1978 book The Reversible World: Symbolic Inversion in Art and Society (Symbol, Myth, and Ritual), folklorist Barbara Babcock defines mundus inversus as:

any act of expressive behavior which inverts, contradicts, abrogates, or in some fashion presents an alternative to commonly held cultural codes, values, and norms — be they linguistic, literary or artistic, religious or social and political.

== See also ==
- Pittura infamante, a Renaissance-era "defaming portrait" that often depicts mundus inversus motifs
