= Rodolfo II da Varano =

Ridolfo (sometimes Rodolfo) II da Varano, signore di Camerino (flourishing 1344 — 1384), was a condottiero operating in Italy from the 1360s. His forebears had long held the rocca of Varano on the borderland of the Papal States, controlling a major strategic pass between Umbria and the Marche, a link between Rome and the Adriatic coast. He inherited from Gentile di Berardo da Varano in 1355, and undertook the improvement of the fortifications that protected the commune and its rocca.

The son of Berardo da Varano and nephew of Gentile di Berardo da Varano, whom he succeeded in 1355, Ridolfo had proved his mettle in a dramatic capture of Smyrna in 1344, in guise of a "crusade" for the Knights of Rhodes under Jean de Biandra, Prior of Lombardy. In the year of his inheritance he gained a signal victory over Galeotto de' Malatesta near Paderno di Ancona in 1355, captured Recanati and at Castelfidardo made Galeotto prisoner; on 2 June 1355, a treaty was concluded, approved by Pope Innocent VI on 20 June. The treaty was cemented by Galeotto's marriage to his daughter. In 1360 he fought for Pope Clement VI. Subsequently, he was created Papal gonfaloniere and reconquered Rimini, Fano, Pesaro, Fossombrone, Ascoli Piceno and Forlì. Later he was hired by the Angevines of Naples, for whom he was governor of Abruzzo.

In 1362 he fought for the Florentines against Pisa, notably in the capture of Peccioli, where he succeeded Bonifazio Lupo, to whom Matteo, the continuator of Giovanni Villani's chronicle, compared him, as "nobler in birth, but much inferior in swiftness and mind" a lack of initiative: "He remained sleeping mornings until the third hour, in a bed supplied with low company and leading a quiet, courtly life>"

In 1370 he victoriously warred for Florence against Bernabò Visconti. The commune of Camerino was one of many in the Papal States that rose in rebellion against papal authority during the war headed by Florence against the French-allied papacy of Gregory XI, in which Ser John Hawkwood ("Giovanni Acuto") distinguished himself. In 1375 Ridolfo held Bologna, until recently occupied by papal troops under a legate, for the appointed emergency Florentine magistracy, the Otto di Guardia ("Eight of War"). Then, however, in a reverse typical of the times, in 1377 he was made commander-in-chief by Gregory XI, and was sent to fight against Florence. As an ally of the cardinal general of papal forces, Gil de Albornoz, in operations once more against the Malatesta of Rimini, turning over to him the supreme command of the papal army. For this the Florentines had him depicted on the facade of a public building, in a defaming portrait, "traitor to the Holy Mother Church, to the popolo and commune of Florence and to all its allies," as hanging by his left foot, upside down on a gallows, with a siren on his left and a basilisk on his right while wearing a bishop's mitre (circa 13 October 1377),

His rise as papal commander was however halted when, due to strife with Albornoz, the latter had him imprisoned. After being freed, Rodolfo moved again to support the Republic of Florence, for which he took part in the conquest of Pisa in 1362. The following year he warred for Perugia. In the same period, with the consent of Pope Urban V, he had his uncle killed and therefore he became lord of Camerino. He became also lord of Macerata. Rodolfo suffered however two defeats at Montemilone and Fabriano.

He died at Tolentino in 1384.

He had one daughter, Elisabetta da Varano, married to Galeotto I Malatesta
