= Pittura infamante =

Defamatory depiction of petty criminals in Renaissance Italian art

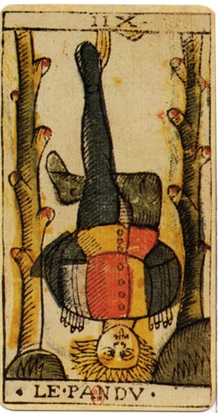
The Hanged Man from Tarot decks is thought to be typical of pittura infamante frescoes, although none are extant

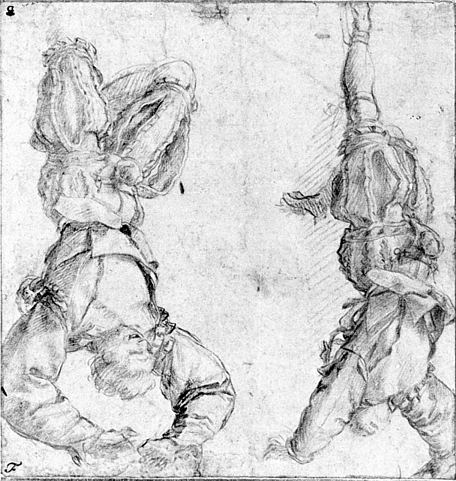
Preparatory drawings for pittura infamante by Andrea del Sarto

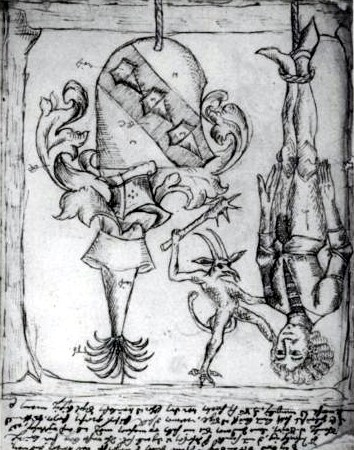
A German Schandbild (circa 1490)

Pittura infamante (pronounced [pitˈtuːra iɱfaˈmante]; Italian for "defaming portrait"; plural pitture infamanti) is a genre of defamatory painting and relief, common in Renaissance Italy in city-states in North Italy and Central Italy during the Trecento, Quattrocento, and Cinquecento. Popular subjects of pitture infamanti include traitors, thieves, and those guilty of bankruptcy or public fraud, often in cases where no legal remedy was available. Commissioned by governments of city-states and displayed in public centers, pitture infamanti were both a form of "municipal justice" (or "forensic art") and a medium for internal political struggles.

According to Samuel Edgerton, the genre began to decline precisely when it came to be regarded as a form of art rather than effigy; the power of the genre derived from a feudal-based code of honor, where shame was one of the most significant social punishments. As such, pittura infamante has its roots in the doctrines of fama and infamia in ancient Roman law.

== Display ==
Pitture infamanti could appear in any public place, but some places were more frequently adorned with them; for example, the first floor exterior of the Bargello (originally a barracks and prison, now an art museum) periodically contained numerous, life-size, pittura infamante frescoes. Florentine law required the Podestà have such caricatures painted, and accompanied by verbal identification of those held in contempt of court for financial offenses (bad debt, bankruptcy, fraud, forgery, etc.). Pitture infamanti were far more common in Republican Florence than in autocratic city states, whose rulers often deemed them to be sources of "disrepute".

== Themes ==
Common themes of pitture infamanti – which were meant to be humiliating – include depicting the subject as wearing a mitre, hanging upside down, or being in the presence of unclean animals such as pigs or donkeys or those deemed evil like snakes; pitture infamanti would also contain captions listing the offenses of the subject. Pitture infamanti could originate as more favorable depictions, only to be transformed after the subject had fallen out of favor.

== Imagery ==
Pitture infamanti always depicted men and never women, and generally depicted upper-class men (who would have the most to lose from character assassination). The act of hanging itself was also significant, as affluent criminals would generally be afforded the privilege of beheading rather than hanging; hanging was also shameful in religious contexts (e.g. Judas). The topos of mundus inversus ("world upside down") is often associated with comedy and humiliation.

Famous artists who painted pittura infamante frescoes include Andrea del Castagno, Sandro Botticelli, and Andrea del Sarto. There are no surviving examples of pittura infamante frescoes, but contemporary sources suggest that they were brightly colored. Detailed descriptions of pitture infamanti in primary sources are rare. A very few preparatory drawings, however, are extant, and The Hanged Man from Tarot cards is thought to resemble the archetypal pittura infamante theme, as Tarot decks were first produced in northern Italy in the 1440s.

== Records ==
Documentary evidence for pittura infamante outside Italy is rarer but existent. For example, records support the use of "very unpleasant pictures" painted on cloths during the Hundred Years' War and the reign of King Louis XI of France, and – later – in England and north Germany.

Pitture infamanti were the counterpoint of another contemporary form of secular, full-length portrait: uomini famosi ("famous men") or uomini illustri ("illustrious men"), which depicted figures from the Old Testament or Antiquity in a positive context, generally on the interior of private or civic buildings as moral exemplars.

== Subjects of pittura infamante ==
=== Bologna ===
- Konrad von Landau, painted on the walls of Bologna for treachery; in response Landau created his own pittura infamante on the saddle of his horse, depicting the local politicians hung upside down by their feet in the hand of a giant whore.

=== Fermo ===
- Rinaldo da Monteverde, the papal governor of Fermo, "fell victim to humiliating popular justice" in the form of a pittura infamante.

=== Florence ===
- Niccolò Piccinino, in the Palazzo della Signoria in 1428, which depicted him hanging upside down in chains; "depaint[ed]" in April 1430. Hanging upside down by one foot was a common theme for pitture infamanti of condottieri who switched sides.
- The eight Pazzi conspirators, on the wall above the Dogana by Botticelli, commissioned by the Otto di Guardia e Balia in 1478; visible from the Sala dei Gigli until its removal in 1494.
- Ridolfo di Camerino, "traitor to the Holy Mother Church, to the popolo and commune of Florence and to all its allies", painted upside down on a gallows, hanging by his left foot on the facade of the Army Pay Office with a siren on his left and a basilisk on his right while wearing a bishop's mitre (circa October 13, 1377).
- Rodolfo II da Varano, who defected to the papacy during the War of the Eight Saints, depicted on a gallows attached to the neck of a devil.

=== Milan ===
- Reliefs of Frederick Barbarossa and Beatrice of Burgundy set on the Porta Romana and Porta Tosa, Milan.

== See also ==
- The Allegory of Good and Bad Government
- Death of Benito Mussolini § Piazzale Loreto
- Denunciation
- Graffiti
- Upside-down painting – Practice of hanging paintings in inverted orientation
- Wanted poster
