= Cockatrice =

Mythological serpent

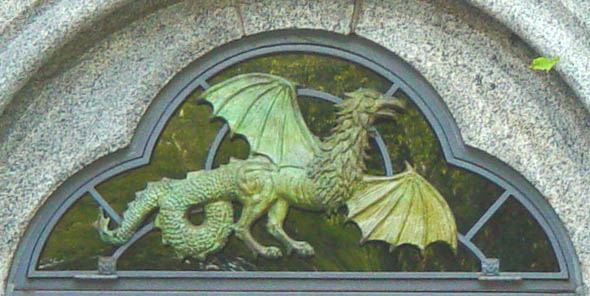
A cockatrice overdoor at Belvedere Castle (1869) in New York's Central Park.

A cockatrice is a mythical beast, essentially a two-legged dragon, wyvern, or serpent-like creature with a rooster's head. Described by Laurence Breiner as "an ornament in the drama and poetry of the Elizabethans", it was featured prominently in English thought and myth for centuries. According to legend, they are created by a chicken egg hatched by a toad or snake.

== Legend ==
=== Origins ===
The first English mention of the cockatrice was in the 14th-century John Wycliffe translation of the Bible. The word was used for the translation of various Hebrew words for asp and adder in the Book of Isaiah 11, 14 and 59.

The Oxford English Dictionary gives a derivation from Old French cocatris, from medieval Latin calcatrix, a translation of the Greek ichneumon, meaning tracker. The twelfth-century legend was based on a reference in Pliny's Natural History that the ichneumon or hydrus lay in wait for the crocodile to open its jaws for the trochilus bird to enter and pick its teeth clean. An extended description of the cocatriz by the 15th-century Spanish traveller in Egypt, Pedro Tafur, makes it clear that this refers to the Nile crocodile although, this characterization might be due to confusion because the cockatrice was also occasionally conflated with the Hydrus.

According to Alexander Neckam's De naturis rerum (c. 1180), the basilisk (basiliscus) was the product of an egg laid by a rooster and incubated by a toad; a snake might be substituted in re-tellings. Cockatrice became seen as synonymous with basilisk when the basiliscus in Bartholomeus Anglicus's De proprietatibus rerum (ca 1260) was translated by John Trevisa as cockatrice (1397). This legend has a possible Egyptian folk root; the eggs of the ibis were regularly destroyed for fear that the venom of the snakes they consumed would cause a hybrid snake-bird to hatch.

It is thought that a cock egg would hatch a cockatrice, and this could be prevented by tossing the egg over the family house, landing on the other side of the house, without allowing the egg to hit the house.

=== Abilities ===
According to myth, the cockatrice can kill people by touch, breath, or a glance, a trait referred to in literature as "the death-darting eye of Cockatrice". (Note: The idea of vision in an "eye-beam", a stream emanating from the eye was inherited by the Renaissance from Antiquity; it forms an elaborately-worked-out simile in John Donne's "The Exstacie": "Our eye-beames twisted and did thred/ Our eyes, upon one double string.")

It was repeated in the late-medieval bestiaries that the weasel is the only animal that is immune to the glance of a cockatrice. It was also thought that a cockatrice would die instantly upon hearing a rooster crow, and according to legend, having a cockatrice look at itself in a mirror is one of the few sure-fire ways to kill it.

=== In alchemy ===
In the practice of alchemy the cockatrice is ascribed two main properties; the earliest seems the ability to transmute mercury into silver. The cockatrice was also thought to be necessary in the creation of the Philosopher’s Stone.

=== Cultural references ===
The first use of the word in English was in John Wyclif's 1382 translation of the Bible to translate different Hebrew words. This usage was followed by the King James Version, the word being used several times. The Revised Version—following the tradition established by Jerome's Vulgate basiliscus—renders the word as "basilisk", and the New International Version translates it as "viper". In Proverbs 23:32 the similar Hebrew tzeph'a is rendered "adder", both in the Authorized Version and the Revised Version.

In Shakespeare's play Richard III (c. 1593), the Duchess of York compares her son Richard to a cockatrice:

O ill-dispersing wind of misery!
O my accursed womb, the bed of death!
A cockatrice hast thou hatch'd to the world,
Whose unavoided eye is murderous.

A cockatrice is also mentioned in Romeo and Juliet (1597), in Act 3, scene 2 line 47, by Juliet.

Hath Romeo slain himself? Say thou but 'Ay,'
And that bare vowel 'I' shall poison more
Than the death-darting eye of cockatrice.

Nathan Field, in the first scene of his play The Honest Man's Fortune (1647), also uses the idea that a cockatrice could kill with its eyes:

... never threaten with your eyes, they are no cockatrice's ...

In Second Nephi 24:29, a Cockatrice is mentioned.

In E. R. Eddison's high fantasy novel The Worm Ouroboros (1922), Chapter 4 has King Gorice show a cockatrice to Gro:

"Behold and see, that which sprung from the egg of a cock, hatched by the deaf adder. The glance of its eye sufficeth to turn to stone any living thing that standeth before it. Were I but for one instant to loose my spells whereby I hold it in subjection, in that moment would end my life days and thine ..."

Therewith came forth that offspring of perdition from its hole, strutting erect on its two legs that were the legs of a cock; and a cock's head it had, with rosy comb and wattles, but the face of it like no fowl's face of middle-earth but rather a gorgon's out of Hell. Black shining feathers grew on its neck, but the body of it was the body of a dragon with scales that glittered in the rays of the candles, and a scaly crest stood on its back; and its wings were like bats' wings, and its tail the tail of an aspick with a sting in the end thereof, and from its beak its forked tongue flickered venomously. And the stature of the thing was a little above a cubit.

The cockatrice has also been used as a staple enemy creature in arcade combat games like Golden Axe, in fantasy RPGs such as Fighting Fantasy and Dungeons and Dragons or computer RPGs like Dragon's Dogma (2012).

A cockatrice is mentioned in Harry Potter and the Goblet of Fire (2000) by Hermione Granger in chapter fifteen. A cockatrice involved in one of the tasks of the 1792 Triwizard Tournament escaped and injured the headmasters of the three participating schools, an incident cited as the cause for the cancellation of Triwizard Tournaments until 1994. Some translations instead state the cockatrice to be a basilisk (Note: Spanish and Portuguese: basilisco, Russian: васили́ск, Greek: βασιλίσκος) or an "occamy", (Note: Polish: "żmijoptak") an in-universe relative of the snallygaster. Additionally, heraldry of a white cockatrice holding a broomstick on a blue and beige background is shown to be the emblem of the French National Quidditch team in the 2003 video game Harry Potter: Quidditch World Cup.

In the video game Boktai: The Sun Is in Your Hand (2003), cockatrices are among the enemies the player faces in Sol City.

In the animated series My Little Pony: Friendship Is Magic (2010–2019), a cockatrice is stated to live in the Everfree Forest. In the 2011 episode "Stare Master", the cockatrice turns Twilight Sparkle and one of Fluttershy's chickens, Elizabeak, to stone using its gaze, but reverts them back after being intimidated by Fluttershy's own stare.

On the SCP Foundation collaborative writing project, cockatrices are shown in the story "SCP-1013 - Cockatrice" (2011). An SCP-1013 instead paralyzes its prey by staring at them, only turning their skin to stone upon biting them, after which it will peck through the calcified skin to eat their prey's fleshy innards. SCP-1013 reproduce from growths budding off of the tail of a well-fed adult. The story "SCP-1013 - Cockatrice" won fourth place in the site's SCP-1000 Contest, a contest that prefaced the opening of the site's second series.

A cockatrice is shown as the main antagonist in the first episode of Netflix's anime adaptation of Little Witch Academia (2017), "Starting Over". The cockatrice is also a dungeon boss in the underground labyrinth gameplay section of Little Witch Academia: Chamber of Time (2017), a video game for PC and PlayStation 4.

The Swedish black metal band Funeral Mist has a song named "Cockatrice" in their 2018 album Hekatomb.

The third chapter of the Japanese manga series Delicious in Dungeon (2014) and the second episode of the anime adaptation (2024) feature the party killing and cooking a basilisk. The basilisk is depicted as large rooster with a snake for a tail. The basilisk cannot kill with a stare, but instead has a powerful venom, which can be cured with an antidote. In chapter 34 of the manga a cockatrice appears, which is depicted as a larger cousin to the basilisk using a different species of component bird and snake, and has petrifying venom which curses victims, temporarily turning them to stone.

== In heraldry ==
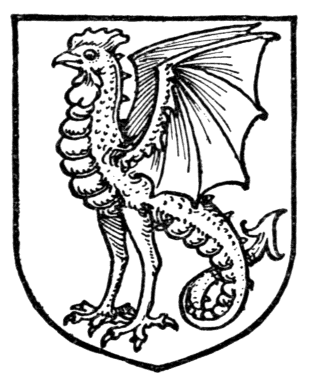
Heraldic cockatrice

Arthur Fox-Davies describes the cockatrice as "comparatively rare" in heraldry, and as closely resembling a wyvern outside of possessing a rooster's head rather than a dragon's. The cockatrice, like the rooster, is often depicted with its comb, wattles and beak being of a different colour from the rest of its body. The cockatrice is sometimes referred to as a basilisk, but Fox-Davies distinguishes the two on the basis of the heraldic basilisk possessing a tail ending in a dragon's head, although he does not know of any arms depicting such a creature.

In continental European heraldic systems, cockatrices may be simply referred to as dragons instead.

The cockatrice was the heraldic beast of the Langleys of Agecroft Hall in Lancashire, England, as far back as the 14th century.

It is also the symbol of 3 (Fighter) Squadron, a fighter squadron of the Royal Air Force.

== See also ==
- Abraxas
- Anzu (dinosaur)
- Basan
- Basilisco Chilote
- Basilisk
- The Book of the Dun Cow (novel)
- Cockatrice (Dungeons & Dragons)
- Colo Colo (mythology)
- Ichneumon (medieval zoology)
- Kye-ryong (Korean cockatrice)
- Snallygaster
- Wherwell
- Yi (dinosaur)
