= Walter Wangerin Jr. =

American author and educator (1944–2021)

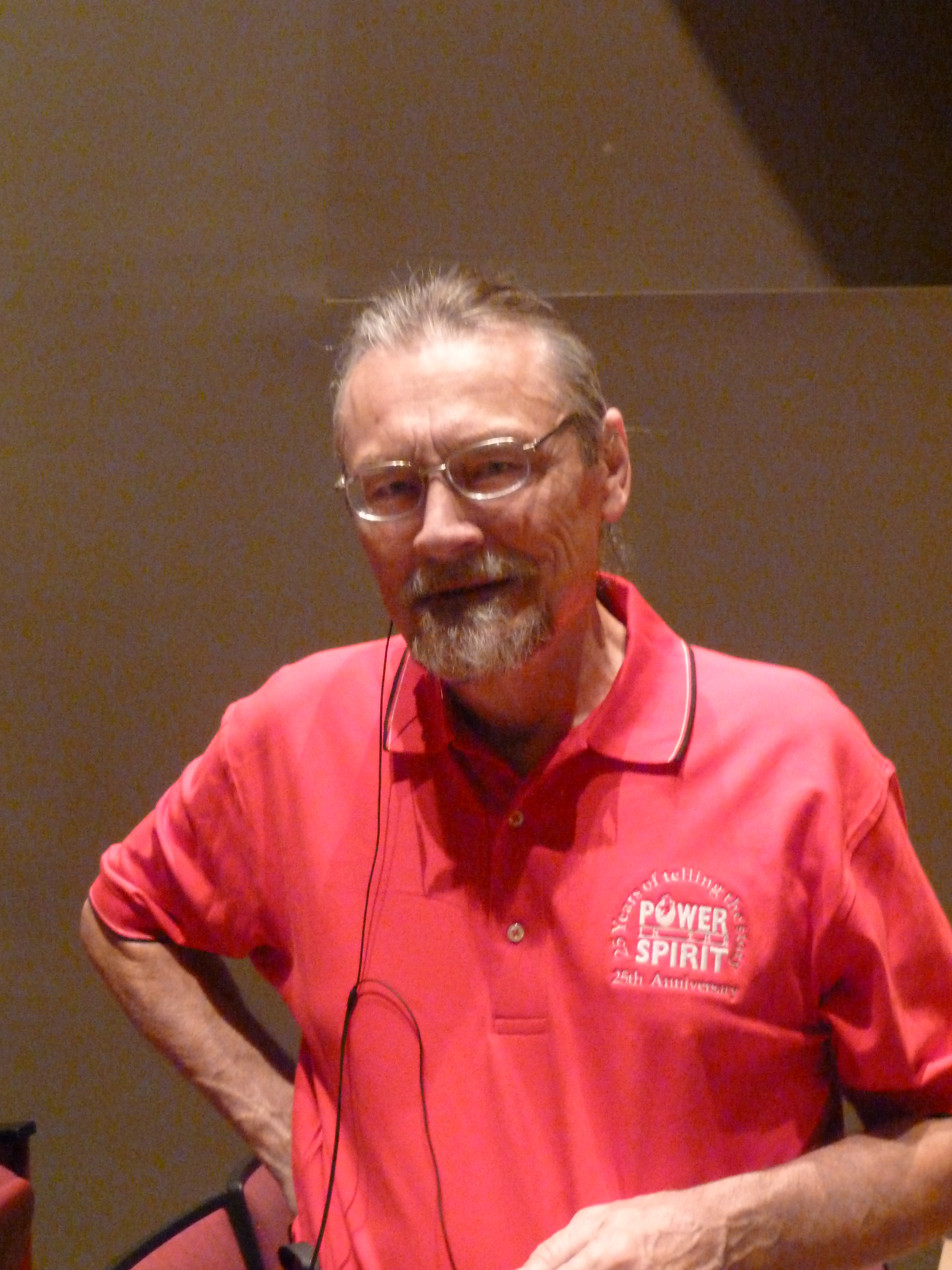
- Born: 13 February 1944; Portland
- Died: 5 August 2021 (aged 77)
- Occupation: Writer, author, orator, radio personality (1994–2005), pastor, theologian, literary scholar, parson
- Awards: National Book Award (The Book of the Dun Cow, 1980)
- Website: walterwangerinjr.org

Walter Wangerin Jr. (February 13, 1944 – August 5, 2021) was an American author and educator best known for his religious novels and children's books.

== Biography ==
Wangerin was born in Portland, Oregon, where his father was a Lutheran pastor. He was the oldest of seven children. The family moved often, so Walter grew up in various locations including Shelton, Washington, Chicago, Illinois, Grand Forks, North Dakota, Edmonton, Alberta, Milwaukee, Wisconsin and Fort Wayne, Indiana. In 1968, he attained an M.A. in English literature from Miami University, Oxford, Ohio. He went on to study at Concordia Seminary and Christ Seminary-Seminex, both in St. Louis, Missouri. He attained his M.Div. from the latter in 1976. From 1970 to 1991, Wangerin taught English at the University of Evansville, Indiana. From 1977 to 1985, he was the pastor of Evansville's Grace Lutheran Church. While in Evansville he wrote a weekly column for The Evansville Press and hosted an evening radio show on WNIN-FM.

He was a professor at Valparaiso University, Valparaiso, Indiana since 1991, where he taught literature, theology, and creative writing, and was writer-in-residence.

Wangerin is the author of over thirty novels, numerous children's books, and a handful of plays, and he has received several awards for his short stories and essays. He has been a college professor, a radio announcer, a book reviewer, and a pastor of a Lutheran church. He also participated in cultural ceremonies such as a Lakota Sun-Dance.

Most of his writing is religious with a focus on marriage, meditation, parenting, and grieving. Other religious books concern the events in the Bible.

Wangerin died on August 5, 2021.

== Awards ==
Wangerin is probably known best for his fables The Book of the Dun Cow and its sequel The Book of Sorrows. The Book of the Dun Cow won a U.S. National Book Award in the one-year category Science Fiction. (Note: From 1980 to 1983 in National Book Award history there were dual awards for hardcover and paperback books in many categories. Most of the paperback award-winners were reprints, including this one.) In 1986, Valparaiso University awarded Wangerin an honorary doctorate.

His Letters from the Land of Cancer received the Award of Merit in the Spirituality category of the 2011 Christianity Today Book Awards.

The Evangelical Christian Publishers Association awarded Wangerin six Gold Medallions (now Christian Book Awards) in several categories.

- 1986, Potter, children's books
- 1988, As For Me and My House, marriage and family
- 1993, Reliving the Passion, devotional
- 1997, The Book of God, fiction
- 1999, Growing Deeper series, inspirational
- 2001, Paul, a Novel, fiction

== Books ==
Religious books

- Ragman and Other Cries of Faith (1984; 2004)
- Miz Lil And The Chronicles Of Grace (1988)
- Little Lamb, Who Made Thee? (1993; 2004)
- Mourning into Dancing (1992)
- Reliving the Passion (1992)
- Branta and the Golden Stone (1993)
- The Book of God: The Bible as a Novel (1996)
- The Simple Truth: A Bare Bones Bible (1996)
- Orphean Passages (1996)
- The Manger is Empty (1998)
- Whole Prayer (1998)
- Preparing for Jesus (1999)
- Prayerbook For Husbands And Wives (2000)
- As for Me and My House: Crafting a Marriage to Last (2001)
- Paul: A Novel (2000)
- Jesus: A Novel (2005)
- The Crying for a Vision (2003)
- This Earthly Pilgrimage (2003)
- In The Days Of The Angels (2007)
- Father and Son: Finding Freedom (2008)
- Naomi and Her Daughters (2010)
- Letters from the Land of Cancer (2010)
- Beate Not the Poore Desk: A Writer to Young Writers (2016)

Poetry

- The Absolute, Relatively Inaccessible (2017)
- On an Age-Old Anvil: Wince and Sing (2018)

Fantasy novels

- The Book of the Dun Cow (1978)
- The Book of Sorrows (1985)
- The Third Book of the Dun Cow: Peace at the Last (2013)

Children's books/stories

- Bible for Children (1981; 2003)
- Thistle (1983; 1995)
- Potter (1985; 1994)
- Elisabeth and the Water Troll (1991)
- In the Beginning, There Was No Sky (1997)
- Mary's First Christmas (1998)
- The Bedtime Rhyme (1998)
- Water, Come Down (1999)
- Peter's First Easter (2000)
- Swallowing The Golden Stone (2001)
- Angels and All Children (2002)
- Probity Jones And The Fear Not Angel (2005)
- I Am My Grandpa's Enkelin (2007)

Historical fiction

- Saint Julian (2003)
