= The Book of the Dun Cow (novel) =

Book by Walter Wangerin

- First edition Cover (1978)
- Author: Walter Wangerin
- Publisher: Harper & Row
- Publication date: 1978
- Pages: 241
- ISBN: 0060263466

The Book of the Dun Cow (1978) is a fantasy novel by Walter Wangerin Jr. It is loosely based upon the beast fable of Chanticleer and the Fox adapted from the story of "The Nun's Priest's Tale" from Geoffrey Chaucer's Canterbury Tales. It has two sequels.

== Plot ==
The novel begins with the introduction of the hero, Chauntecleer, a rooster in command of a company of hens, and the land surrounding his coop. The story takes place at a time when humans have not yet made an appearance upon the Earth (a time before the Book of Genesis). Animals have been put on earth before man in order to protect the world from an ancient evil Wyrm, which is trapped at the center of the Earth. Chauntecleer, while not a bad ruler, is a flawed character, somewhat quick to anger, and self-important. The novel's initial chapters define several important characters as well as the origins of the main antagonists in the book, Wyrm and Cockatrice.

While Chauntecleer spends his days dealing with a rogue rat that has invaded his coop, and trying to become accustomed to a newcomer, Mundo Cani, a depressed dog that is always crying out in anguish, the reader is shown another country from across the river. This is where the author introduces the evil in the book. For in the land away from Chauntecleer's there lives another rooster named Senex. He is a rather weak ruler, and his barnyard subjects don't think anything of him. What troubles Senex the most is his lack of a son, which he mourns greatly over. One day though, he is spoken to by Wyrm, who communicates to him through dreams. Wyrm instructs Senex to have faith in him, and to wait for him to deliver Senex a son of his own. Senex does exactly what his visions request, and soon he manages to lay an egg, defying the natural order of mating. Eventually the egg hatches, though what appears from it is a horror beyond words.

An evil monster named Cockatrice is born. It is a creature with the head, wings, and legs of a chicken, but a thin, gray, scaly, serpent body. He kills Senex, and claims the kingdom for himself. A sycophantic toad serves as Cockatrice's voice and turns the basilisk eggs for him. He becomes an evil tyrant and begins to rape all of the laying hens under his rule, in order to give birth to an army of wicked basilisks; poisonous snakes that he uses to crush any opposers to his will (Toad is killed with them) and destroy the country. A few of the animals manage to escape the land, and flee into Chauntecleer's kingdom, where they live happily for a while, trying to forget the nightmares of their past.

Finally there seems to be peace in the book. There comes a time of spring, when everyone in the land is filled with joy. Chauntecleer has even bred three sons to his name with an escapee from Cockatrice's land, one of his hen victims, Pertelote. Unfortunately he is plagued with terrible prophetic visions all the while. He dreams about the river next to his land, rising up and engulfing everything in an apocalyptic manner. The Dun Cow, one of God's messengers, brings an enigmatic riddle to him about the ways he can defeat the trio of evils: Cockatrice, his basilisk army, and Wyrm himself. During the day he tries to find happiness, but everyone is immediately struck with unbearable sorrow when the rooster's three sons are found lying dead by the river. The same egg-eating rat that Chauntecleer drove away is discovered dying, holding part of a venomous serpent (a basilisk) in his mouth.

Chauntecleer soon discovers the story of Cockatrice, hearing it from his wife, who was a refugee from the land under Cockatrice's dictatorship. Eventually Chauntecleer learns that Cockatrice is attempting to make war on the world of animals, to make way for the coming of his true father, Wyrm. Chauntecleer takes action and bands together all of the animals in his land. All sorts of farm and woodland animals come together to fight the terrible evil that is at hand. They wait for a time, building up their forces, beginning to wonder if this evil really exists. Before long there is a surprise attack on a goofy wild turkey named Thuringer, who dies from a basilisk's bite. However, Mundo Cani saves the remaining turkeys.

Thus begins the war between the basilisks and the animals of the land, a war reminiscent of the battle of Armageddon. The animals suffer massive casualties, but in the end manage to drive the basilisks to death. Unfortunately Cockatrice has not yet been dealt with, so the brave Chauntecleer dons a pair of war spurs (the weapon of choice for a bipedal bird) and goes onto the blood-soaked battlefield to confront his enemy. The battle between the two leaders is fierce and merciless. Cockatrice and his enemy do battle in the sky, and Chauntecleer eventually is forced to wrestle with the evil king on the ground. Chauntecleer manages to gain the upper hand, though not by much, and defeats the evil Cockatrice. He throws the monster's head into the river, and Wyrm announces his presence. Chauntecleer faints from weakness, and is brought back to the coop, which has by now been transformed into a fortress, where they try to resuscitate their fallen, but victorious, hero.

Trouble is still ahead, though, for although all of the animals thought the war over, there enters the final evil. A great crevasse in the land breaks open, as Wyrm attempts to enter the world. During all of the turmoil Chauntecleer stirs inside the coop, and, delirious from exhaustion, he sees the dog and thinks him a traitor. He scolds him fiercely, rebuking him and instructing him to leave. In response, the other animals all agree that Chauntecleer is delusional, and that Mundo Cani should not be forced to leave. The dog turns to them and tells them that he knows what he must do, and takes off without any further words. The animals are confused by all of this, and only Chauntecleer, still in delirium, shouts for Wyrm to emerge so that they can fight. Just as Wyrm is about to creep from his prison onto the earth, he is confronted by a certain small dog. Mundo Cani comes to the crevasse, wielding the horn of the Dun Cow as a weapon, egging the ancient evil out of its crevasse by insulting it, insinuating that Wyrm is a coward not to face a small dog such as he. Wyrm falls for the trap, and when he sticks out his bright white eye, that he might see his opponent, the dog leaps onto his eye and impales it with the horn in his mouth.

This causes Wyrm to fall back into the crevasse, collapsing the earth and sealing both Wyrm and Mundo Cani in a dark world below the crust. The entire world is safe again, though horribly shaken. The animals all find it difficult to fit back into their normal lives, especially Chauntecleer, who after bottling his emotions for a while, breaks down in front of his wife. He cries out in pain, knowing that the last thing he said to Mundo Cani before his great sacrifice, were words of scorn and hatred. His wife seeks to comfort him, saying that his penance is to honor Mundo Cani and to ask for his forgiveness.

== Sequels ==
Wangerin wrote two sequels, The Book of Sorrows (1985) and The Third Book of the Dun Cow: Peace at the Last (2013). The Book of Sorrows received awards from Campus Life and Logos Bookstore.

== Critical reception ==
The Book of the Dun Cow was named The New York Times Best Children's Book of the Year and its first paperback edition won a US National Book Award in the one-year category Science Fiction. (Note: From 1980 to 1983 in National Book Award history there were dual awards for hardcover and paperback books in many categories. Most of the paperback award winners, including this one, were reprints.)

== Adaptations ==
A musical version by Mark St. Germain and Randy Courts, was produced Off-Broadway in 2006 by The Prospect Theater Company.

== See also ==
- Cockatrice
- Dun Cow
- Lebor na hUidre
- Midgard serpent
- "The Nun's Priest's Tale"
