= New York City (painting) =

1942 painting by Piet Mondrian

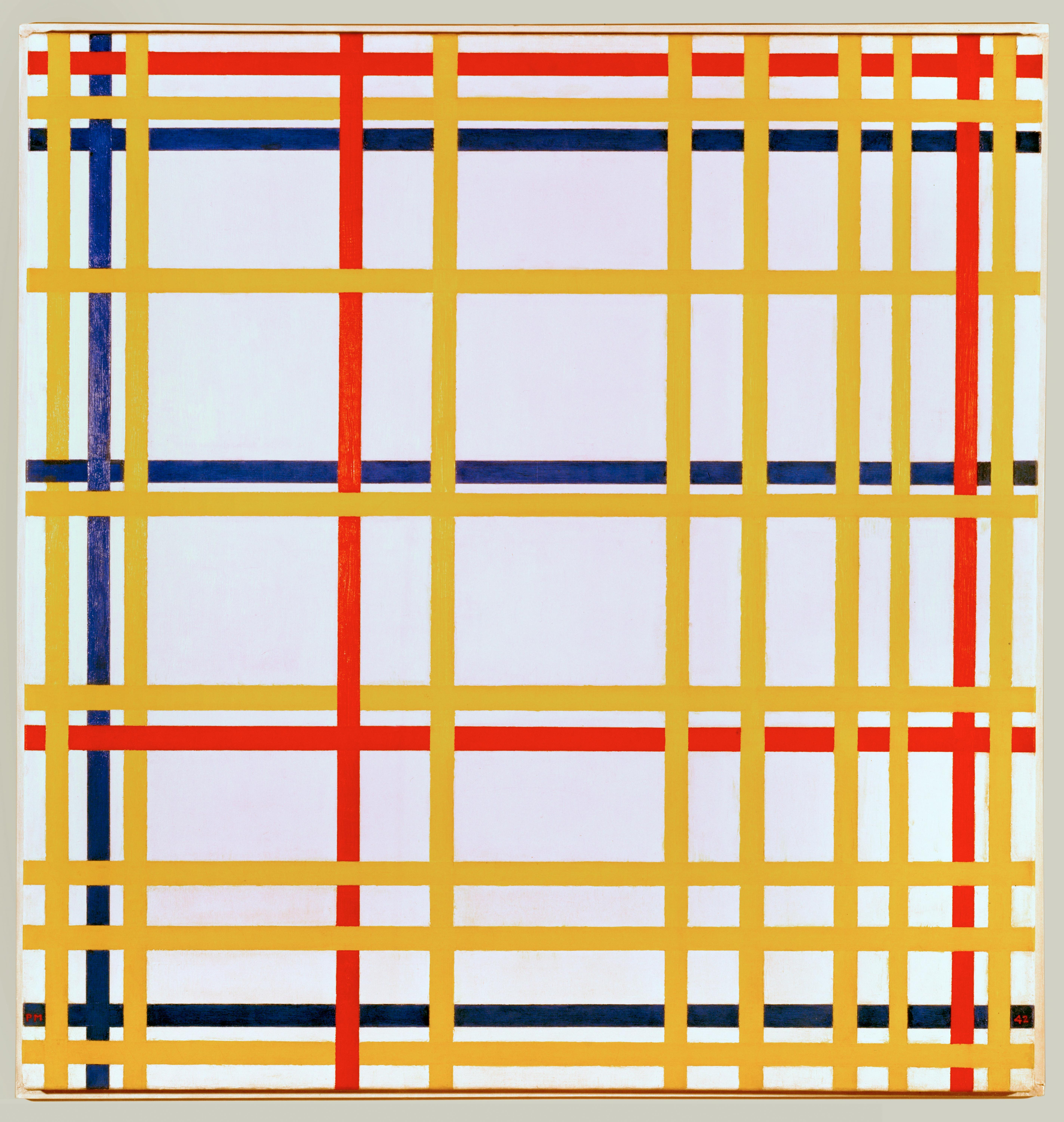
- New York City (1942)
- Artist: Piet Mondrian
- Year: 1942
- Medium: oil on canvas
- Dimensions: 119.3 cm × 114.2 cm (47.0 in × 45.0 in)
- Location: Musée National d'Art Moderne, Paris
- Website: www.centrepompidou.fr/en/ressources/oeuvre/c5pRBL

New York City I
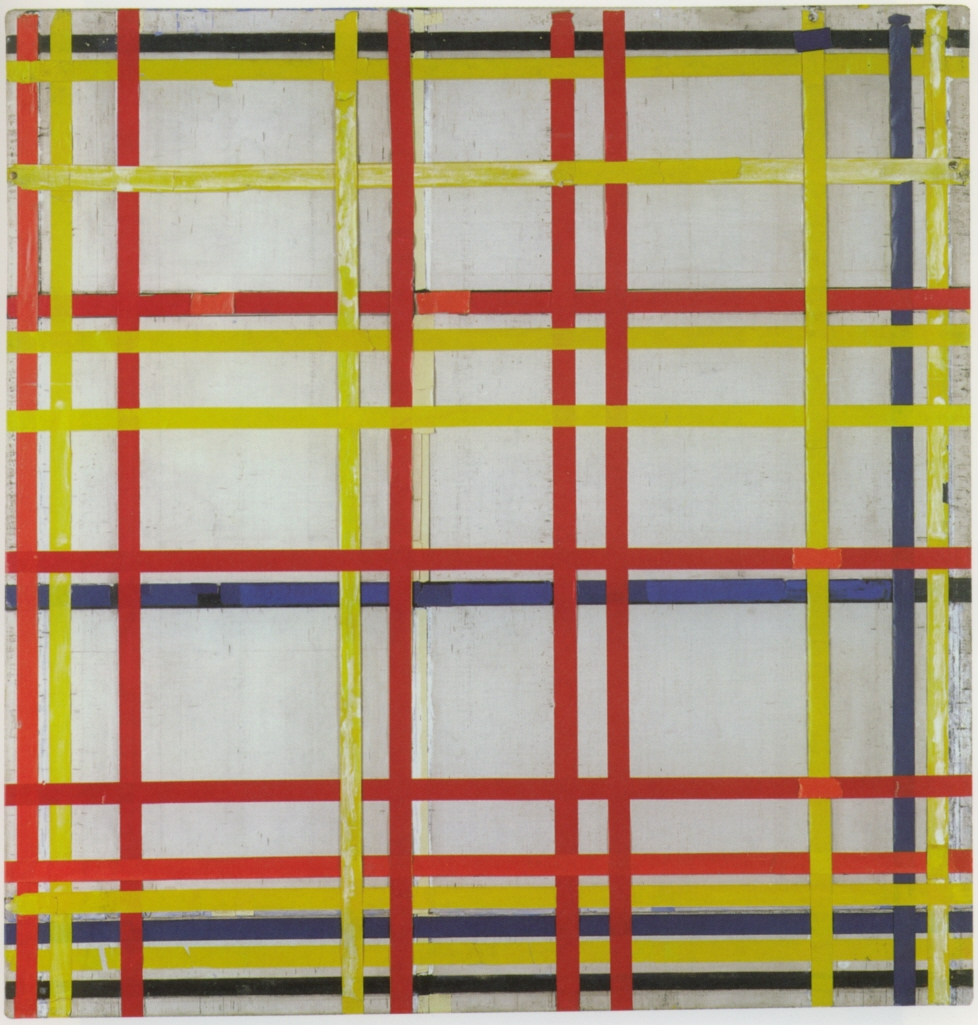
- New York City I (1941), upside down
- Artist: Piet Mondrian
- Year: 1941
- Medium: oil and painted paper strips on canvas
- Dimensions: 120 cm × 115.2 cm (47 in × 45.4 in)
- Condition: upside down
- Location: Kunstsammlung Nordrhein-Westfalen, Düsseldorf

New York City (Note: Formerly known as New York City I, not to be confused with the unfinished version) is a 1942 oil-on-canvas painting by Piet Mondrian, completed in 1942. It is on display in the Musée National d'Art Moderne at the Centre Pompidou in Paris, France.

An unfinished version of the work, titled New York City I, has strips of painted paper tape, which the artist could rearrange at will to experiment with different designs. It is exhibited at Kunstsammlung Nordrhein-Westfalen in Düsseldorf, Germany. (Note: The unfinished version is associated with the year 1941.) In 2022, it was discovered that the artwork had been hanging upside down for years. To avoid damaging the painting, its orientation was not corrected.

== New York City I ==
The Guardian states that the painting was first exhibited at the Museum of Modern Art (MoMA) in New York City in 1945, while the Netherlands Institute for Art History has no record of an exhibition at MoMA, and states that it was first exhibited at the Valentine Gallery in New York City in 1946 for about three weeks. The painting was owned by the estate of Piet Mondrian in New York City until it was transferred to the city's Sidney Janis Gallery in 1958. It was then briefly in the hands of Galerie Beyeler in Basel, Switzerland, in 1980 before being acquired by Kunstsammlung Nordrhein-Westfalen later that same year.

Art historian Susanne Meyer-Büser announced in October 2022 that the artwork had been displayed upside down at the Kunstsammlung Nordrhein-Westfalen for decades. (Note: The Guardian states that the painting had been hanging upside down for 75 years at various institutions, since it was first displayed at MoMA in 1945.) The finished New York City has a denser group of lines at the top of the painting, which were said to represent the sky, while New York City I was displayed with those lines at the bottom. A picture of the painting in the artist's studio also showed the painting oriented with the denser lines at the top. It was conjectured that the lack of a signature on the canvas contributed to the confusion. Mondrian had not signed the work, possibly because it was unfinished.

After the issue was pointed out, a number of curators stated that the error was obvious. The museum decided to keep the painting oriented upside down, due to the fragile state of the work. It was feared that righting the artwork would cause parts of it to disintegrate, as the adhesive used had deteriorated and some of the tapes were "hanging by a thread".
