= The Boat (Matisse) =

Painting by Henri Matisse

- Artist: Henri Matisse
- Year: 1953
- Type: Paper-cut
- Dimensions: 13.84 cm × 10.33 cm (5.4 in × 4.1 in)
- Location: New York; Museum of Modern Art

The Boat (French: Le Bateau) is a paper-cut from 1953 by Henri Matisse. The picture is composed from pieces of paper cut out of sheets painted with gouache and was created during the last years of Matisse's life.

== History ==
Le Bateau caused a minor stir when New York City's Museum of Modern Art, which housed it, accidentally hung the work upside-down for 47 days in 1961 until Genevieve Habert, a stockbroker, noticed the mistake and notified a guard. Habert later informed The New York Times, which in turn notified the museum's art director Monroe Wheeler. As a result, the artwork was rehung properly. An assistant curator blamed the confusion on a label on the verso posted the wrong way, as well as screw holes which implied that it had been hung upside down before.

== See also ==
- List of works by Henri Matisse
