= The Gardener (Arcimboldo) =

Painting by Giuseppe Arcimboldo

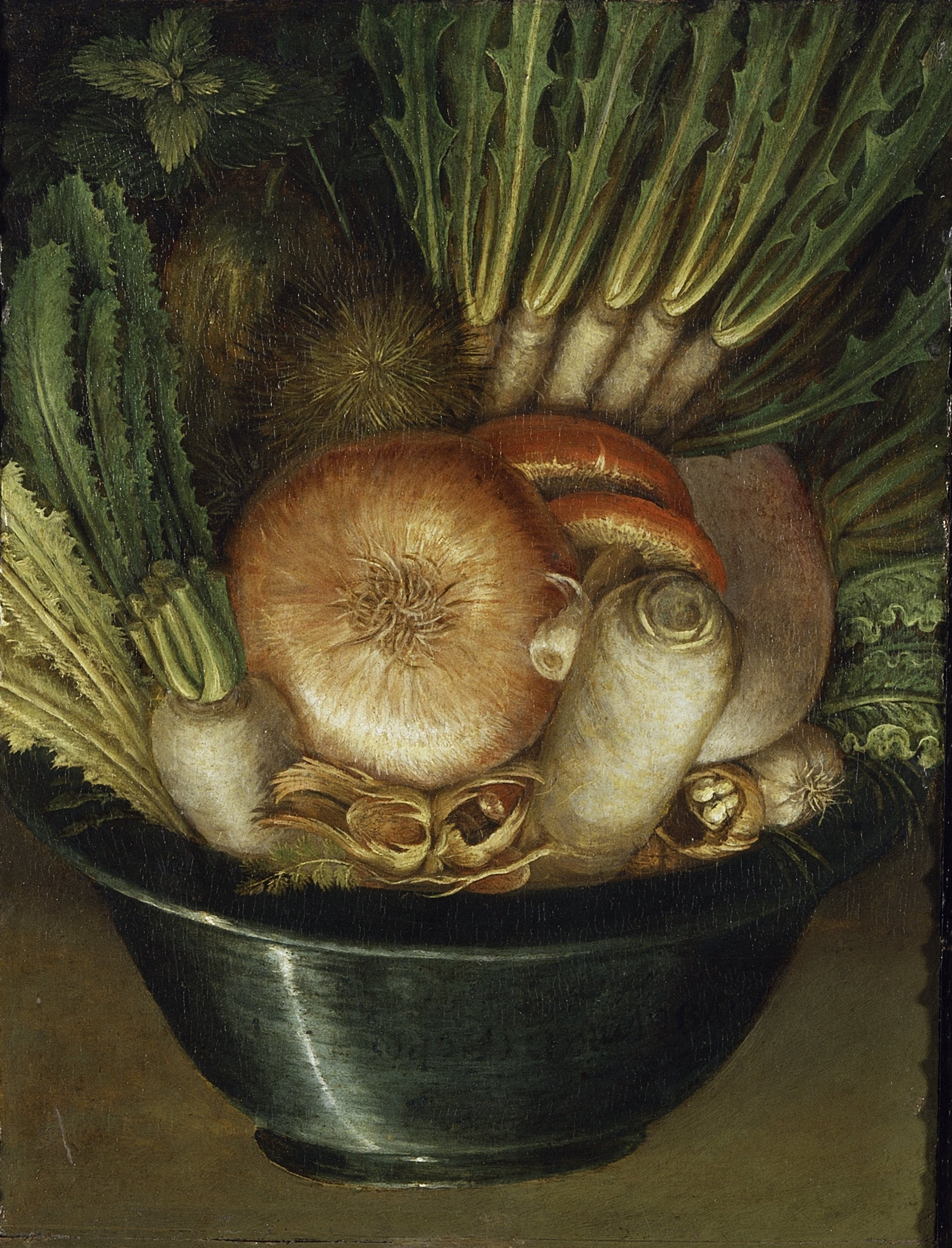
- Artist: Giuseppe Arcimboldo
- Year: c. 1587–1590
- Medium: oil on panel
- Dimensions: 36 cm × 24 cm (14 in × 9.4 in)
- Location: Museo Civico Ala Ponzone, Cremona

The Gardener (Italian - L'ortolano), The Vegetable Gardener or Vegetables in a Bowl is an oil-on-panel painting created ca. 1587–1590 by the Italian painter Giuseppe Arcimboldo, now in the Museo Civico Ala Ponzone in Cremona, Italy. One way up it shows a bowl of vegetables; the other way up it shows a human face by pareidolia. The face includes several suggestions of the male and female genitalia, meaning that it can be interpreted as Priapus, the ithyphallic pagan god of fertility and protector of gardens. The same painter also produced The Fruit Basket and The Cook.

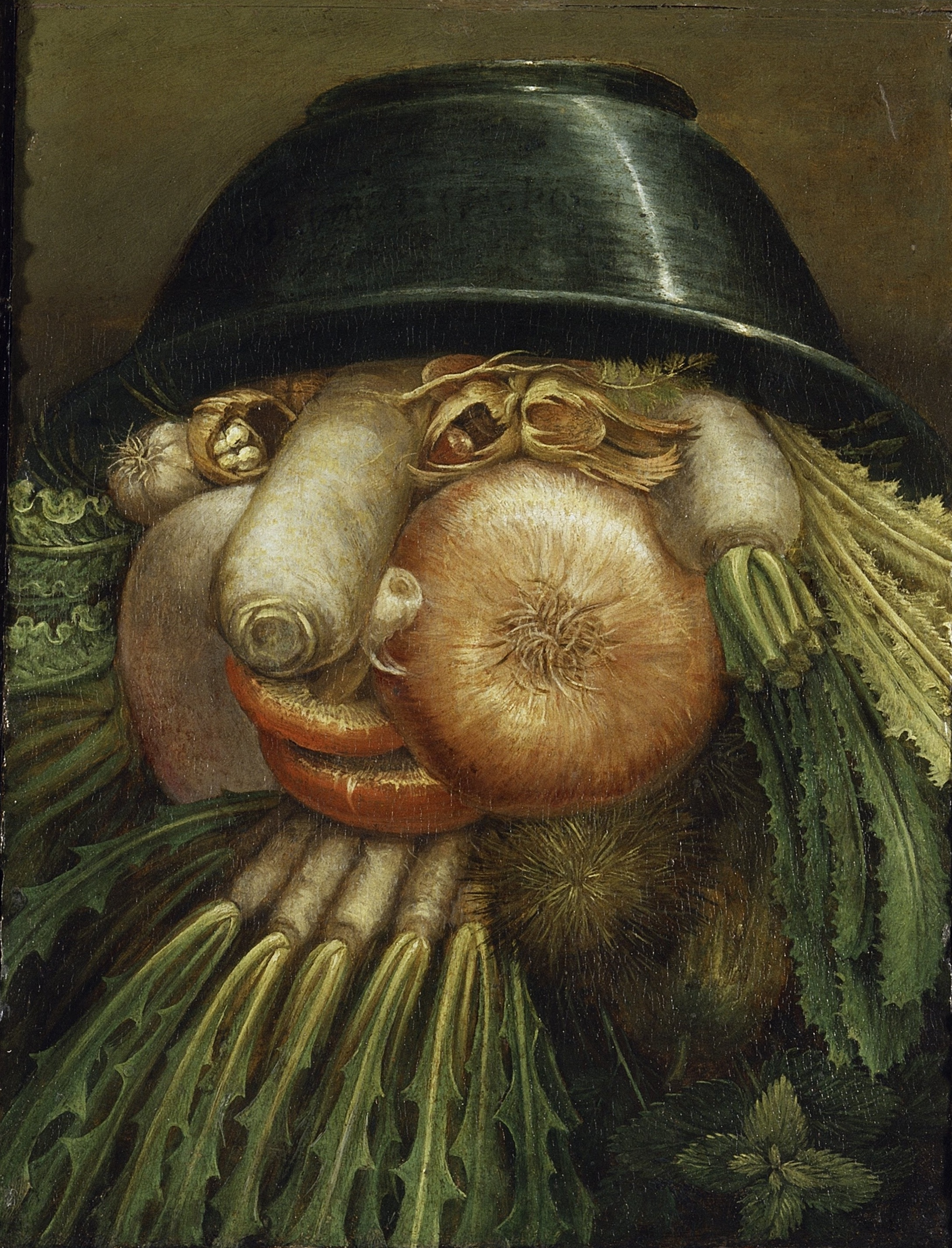
The painting inverted
