= Cikavac =

Serbian mythical creature

Cikavac (Serbian pronunciation: [tsikaʋats]) is a mythical creature in Serbian mythology, imagined as a winged animal (a bird) with long beak and a pelican-like sack.

A cikavac could be acquired by taking an egg from a black hen, which would then be carried by a woman under her armpit for 40 days, during which time one would not confess, cut nails, wash face or pray. The cikavac would then suck honey from others' beehives and milk of others' cattle, and bring it to the owner; it would fulfill any owner's wish, and also enable its owner to understand the animal language.

== See also ==
- Basilisk
