= The Cook (Arcimboldo) =

Painting by Giuseppe Arcimboldo

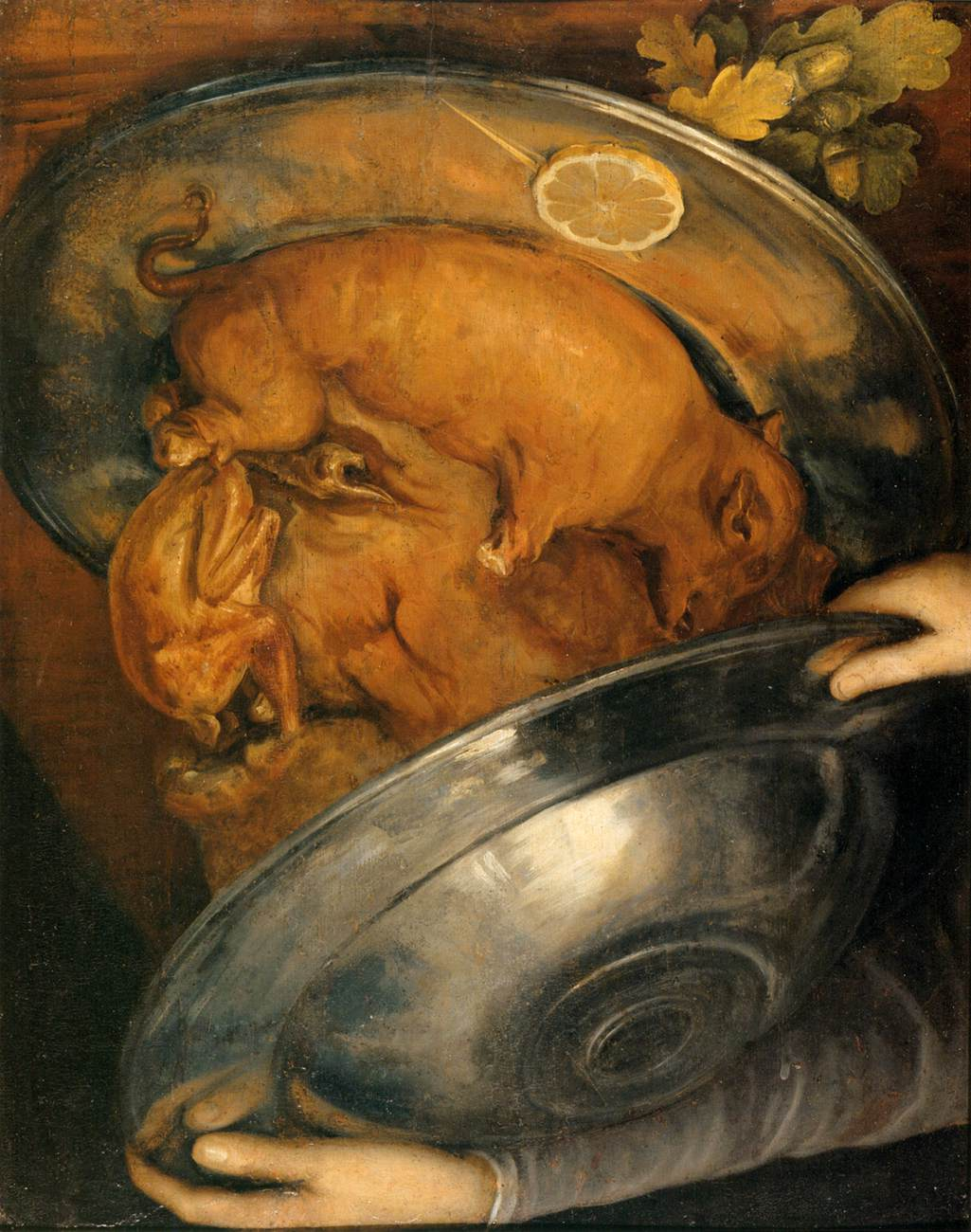
- The painting inverted
- Artist: Giuseppe Arcimboldo
- Year: c. 1570
- Medium: oil on panel
- Dimensions: 53 cm × 41 cm (21 in × 16 in)
- Location: Nationalmuseum, Stockholm

The Cook is a c. 1570 oil-on-panel painting by the Italian painter Giuseppe Arcimboldo, now in the Nationalmuseum, in Stockholm. It is a still life of roasted meats that, when the painting is turned upside-down, form a human face via pareidolia. The painter also produced The Fruit Basket and The Gardener, using a similar effect.

The attribution to Arcimboldo is disputed.

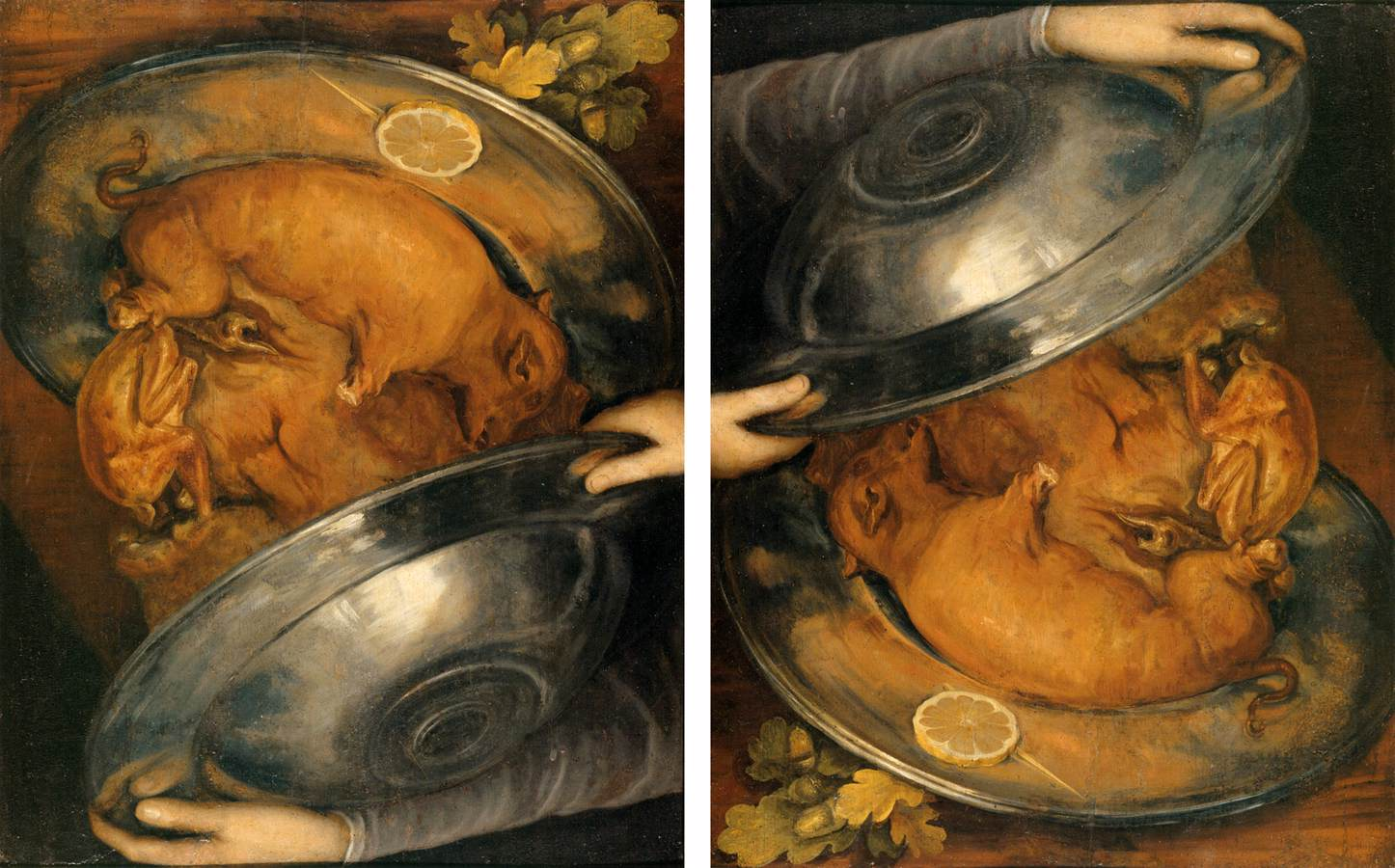
The painting inverted and the right way up
