= The Fruit Basket =

Painting by Giuseppe Arcimboldo

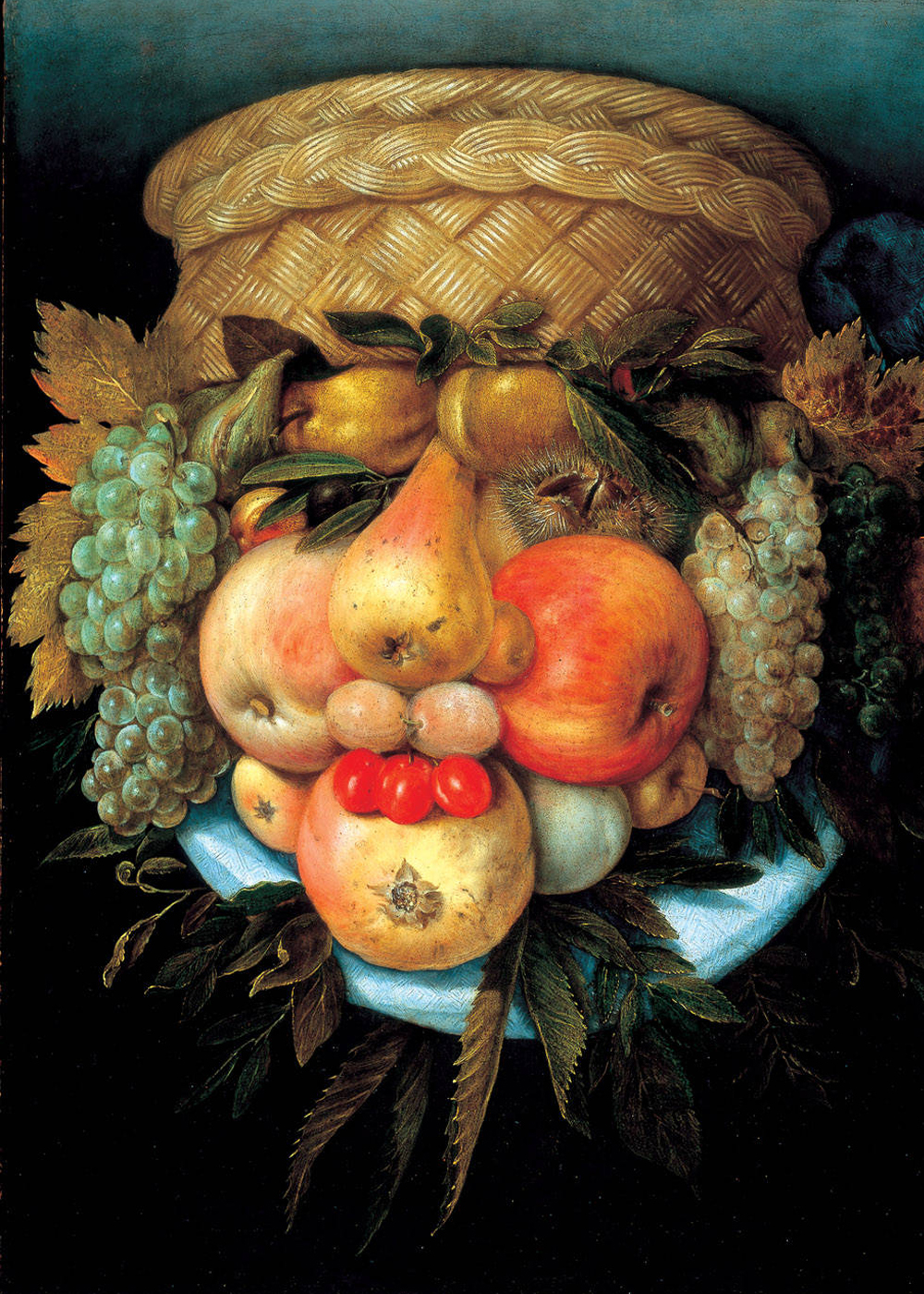
- The painting inverted
- Artist: Giuseppe Arcimboldo
- Year: c. 1590
- Medium: oil on panel
- Dimensions: 56 cm × 42 cm (22 in × 17 in)
- Location: French & Company collection, New York

The Fruit Basket or Reversible Head with a Fruit Basket is a c. 1590 oil-on-panel still life painting by the Italian painter Giuseppe Arcimboldo. It is held in the French & Company collection, in New York. When inverted, it shows an anthropomorphic head by pareidolia. The same painter also produced The Cook and The Gardener.

Arcimboldo's reversible fruit basket painting is an early example of the fruit still life genre. It may have been the inspiration for Caravaggio's 1593 painting Boy with a Basket of Fruit. It may have also had an influence on Fede Galizia and Giovanni Ambrogio Figino, who would both later painted a number of fruit still lifes.

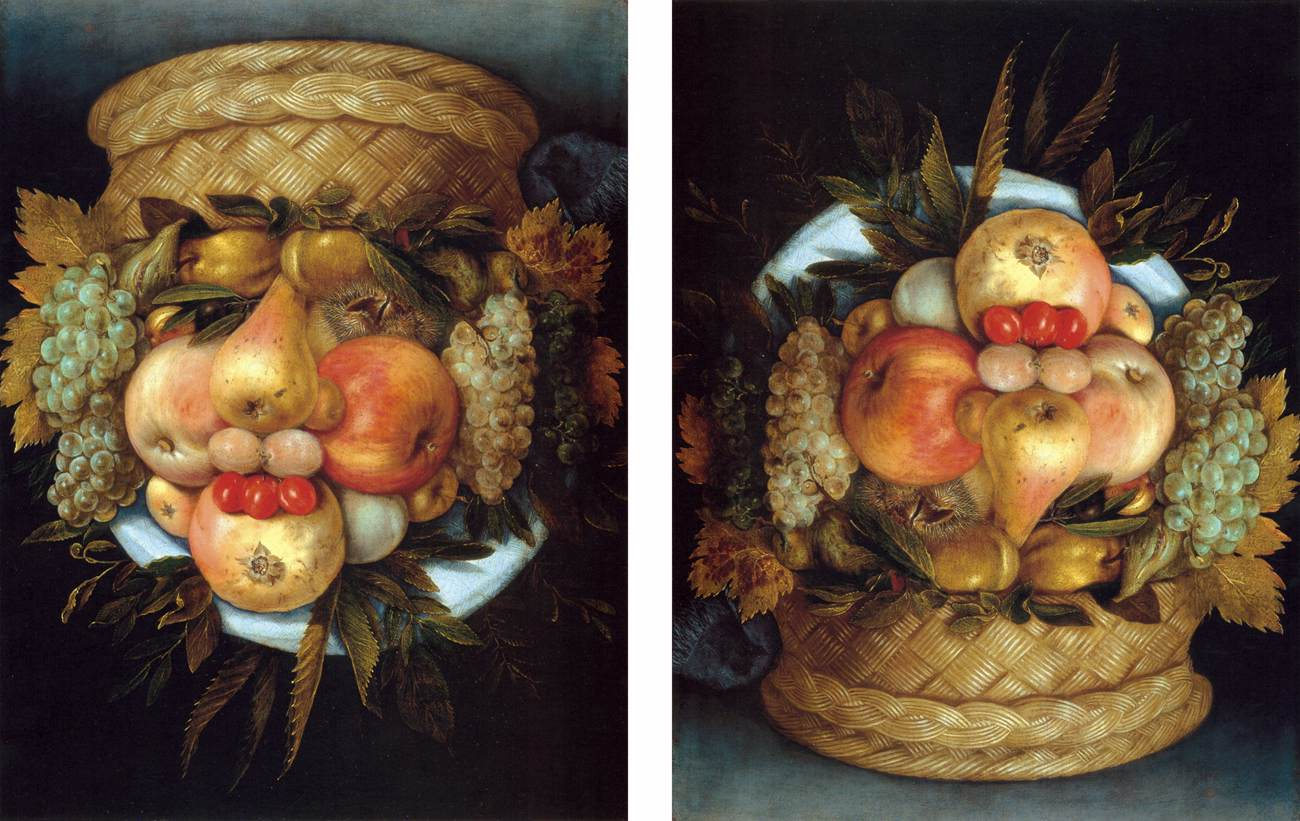
The painting inverted and the right way up

== Bibliography ==
- Ferino-Pagden, Sylvia, ed. (2007). Arcimboldo: 1526-1593. New York: Rizzoli International Publications, Inc. ISBN 978-88-6130-379-9.
