= The Hanged Man (tarot card) =

Tarot card of the Major Arcana

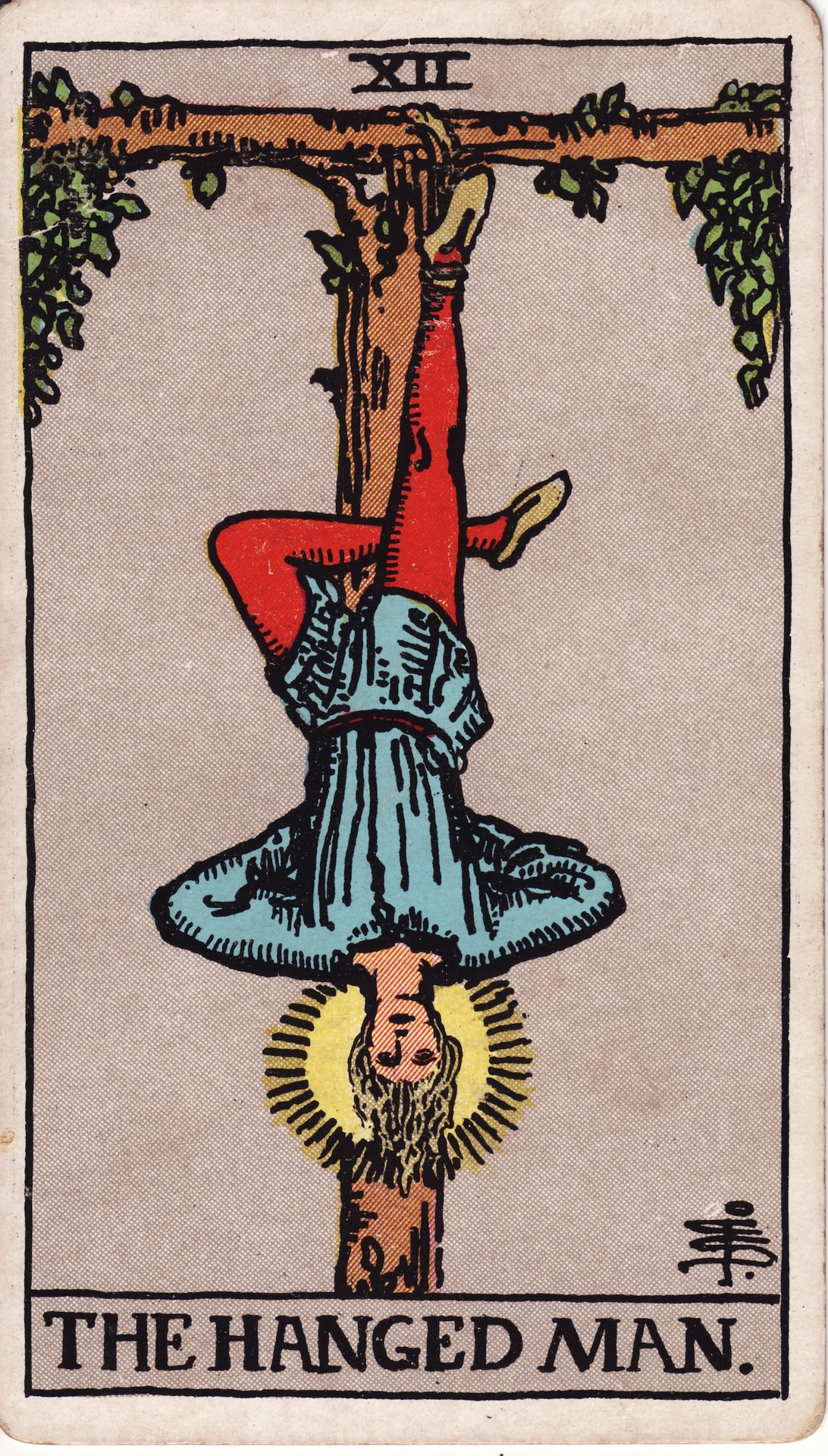
The Hanged Man (XII) from the Rider–Waite tarot deck

The Hanged Man (XII) is the twelfth Major Arcana card in most traditional tarot decks. It is used in game playing as well as in divination.

It depicts a pittura infamante (pronounced [pitˈtuːra iɱfaˈmante]), an image of a man being hanged upside-down by one ankle (the only exception being the Tarocco Siciliano, which depicts the man hanged by the neck instead). However, the expression on his face traditionally suggests that he is there by his own accord, and the card is meant to represent self-sacrifice more so than it does corporal punishment or criminality.

== Description ==
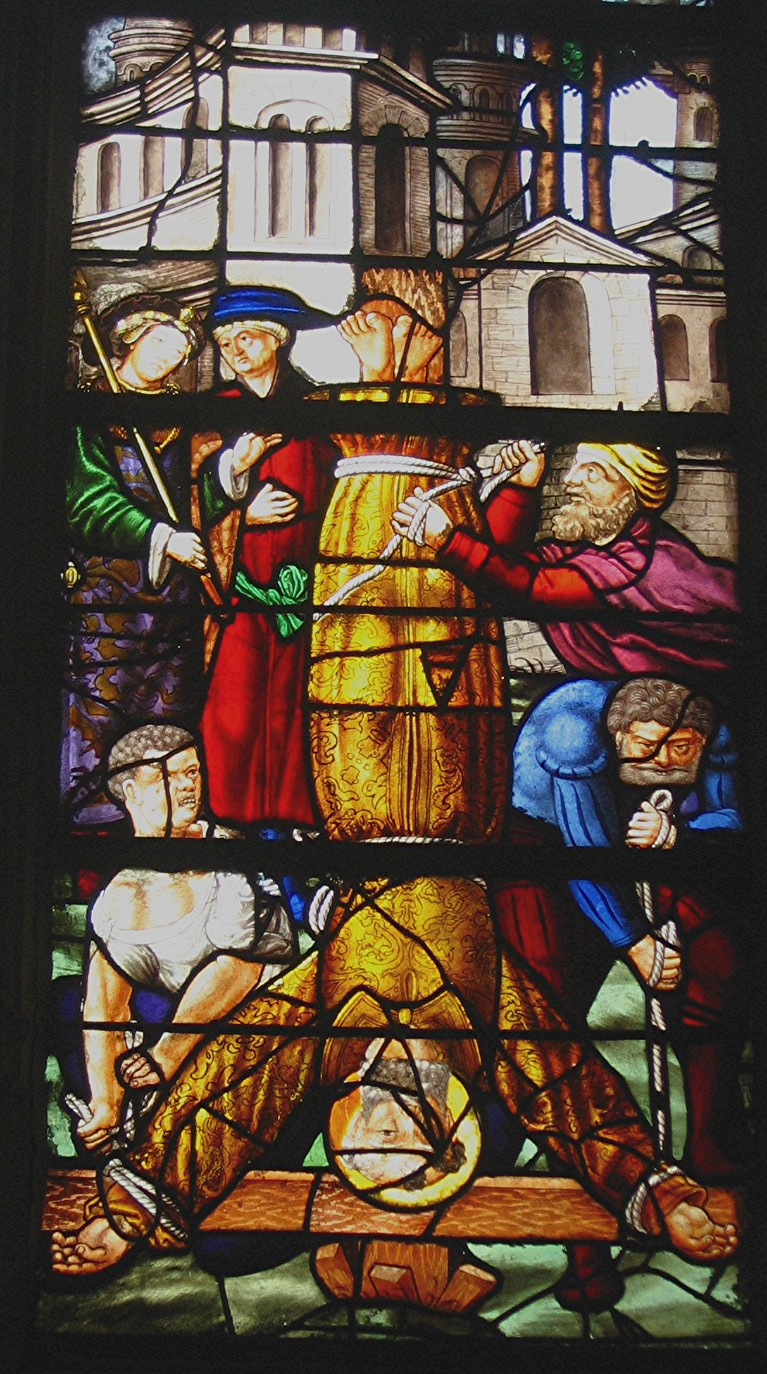
The Cross of St. Peter is shown in this French stained glass window. Saint Peter is conventionally shown as having been crucified upside-down.

Modern versions of the tarot deck depict a man hanging upside-down by one foot. The figure is most often suspended from a wooden beam (as in a cross or gallows) or a tree. Ambiguity results from the fact that the card itself may be viewed inverted.

In his 1910 book The Pictorial Key to the Tarot, A. E. Waite, the designer of the Rider–Waite tarot deck, wrote of the symbol:

The gallows from which he is suspended forms a Tau cross, while the figure—from the position of the legs—forms a fylfot cross. There is a nimbus about the head of the seeming martyr. It should be noted (1) that the tree of sacrifice is living wood, with leaves thereon; (2) that the face expresses deep entrancement, not suffering; (3) that the figure, as a whole, suggests life in suspension, but life and not death. [...] It has been called falsely a card of martyrdom, a card of prudence, a card of the Great Work, a card of duty [...] I will say very simply on my own part that it expresses the relation, in one of its aspects, between the Divine and the Universe.

Waite writes that the card carries several divinatory associations:

12. THE HANGED MAN.—Wisdom, circumspection, discernment, trials, sacrifice, intuition, divination, prophecy. Reversed: Selfishness, the crowd, body politic.

There is a halo burning brightly around the hanged man's head, signifying a higher learning or an enlightenment.
