= The Cu Bird =

Mexican folktale bird

The Cú Bird (Spanish: pájaro cu or cú) is a bird from a Mexican folktale that is unhappy with its looks. According to the legend, the other birds agreed to the barn owl's proposal to give the Cu bird one feather each and in return asked it to become the messenger of the bird council. But the bird soon started neglecting its task because instead it spent time admiring its plumage.

One day the eagle, the head of the council, sent the Cu bird to call other birds to a meeting, but it was so entranced by the reflection of its feathers in a lake that it completely forgot the task. When the eagle came to the appointed place, nobody was there. Angry, the eagle went looking for other birds and they all started quarrelling about who was to blame. Their noise and shouting woke up the god of forests. He sent a silent bird to quieten them down, but being silent, it was ignored by the quarrelling birds. The god became angry and took away the birds' speech.

All the birds blamed the situation on the Cu bird for neglecting its task, and on the owl, because giving the Cu bird a beautiful plumage was its idea. So they promised them a lesson. Now both the owl and the Cu bird hide from other birds in the dark and the Cu bird's beautiful plumage serves no purpose because no one can see it in the light of the Sun.

Another version is a ballad. The Cu bird has no feathers, so the barn owl and the hoot owl (tecolote) organize all the birds to donate a feather each to it; the hoot owl guarantees that the Cu bird will not be a "traitor". However, once the Cu bird is dressed, it flies to better lands, and the other birds blame the hoot owl. This is why the latter calls at night to the Cu bird, Ticú-ticú, and why it cannot see during the day.

There is a song titled "El pájaro cu" in the Mexican Son Jarocho style.
