= Chromandi =

Medieval European legendary creatures

The Chromandi, Chromandae, Choromandae, or Khromandai in Medieval bestiaries were a race of hairy savages with dog teeth.

== Etymology ==
Unknown. The word is most likely either native to Ancient Greek or derived from Sanskrit. The first part is almost certainly derived from Ancient Greek χρῶμα khrôma or at least influenced by it. The rest of the etymology remains unclear.

== Ancient sources ==
Pliny the Elder describes the race in his Natural History, paraphrasing Tauron (most likely referring to a commander of Alexander the Great). He states that the Chromandae are wild, hirsute, blue-eyed, and dog-toothed with a horrible scream despite their lack of a voice. If the aforementioned Tauron does indeed refer to the Macedonian commander who served under Alexander the Great, the Chromandae were likely located somewhere in North India.
