= Chut (Belarusian mythology) =

Household spirit in Belarusian mythology

Chut, or Khut, (Belarusian: Хут) is one of the household spirits in Belarusian mythology. He brings money, grain and success to the hosts of the house, but, if not fed, Chut may perform a cruel revenge on them.

== Description ==
In Belarusian language Chut has masculine grammatical gender, so in most cases Chut is described as a male. He is a polymorphous spirit: he may look like a little boy or dwarf.

The Chut, like the fiery flying serpent (летучий змей), is born from an egg laid by a black rooster, aged either three or seven years, but the egg must be carried by a human in the bosom for one to three years for it to hatch.

It is also able to take the form of both animate and inanimate objects (Note: Boganeva & Kõiva citing Vasilievič.) — a gnarled piece of wood, old wheel, dry stump and so on. Chut appears in the houses, where the daughter either killed her illegitimate child, or tried to raise it without baptizing. Belarusians believe that the soul of this child transforms into Chut. Chut saves the childish features of character forever: he is foolish, playful, joking and emotionally labile. This spirit likes to make fun of the guests: to hide somebody's hat, to spill the beans and peas (and then gather them again at night).

If Chut lives in the house, the host must feed him fried eggs with abaranki (Belarusian: абаранкі, bread akin to the Russian baranka); the combination is ceremonial food, and Belarusians usually eat such fare at weddings, baptisms, on Kupala Night, Trinity Holiday and young women's rites; they are also considered favourite foods of children. The host uses a particular incantation to invite Chut to accept the meal: "Chut, Chut, come here! I'll give You fried eggs and abaranki!" (Belarusian: Хут, Хут, ідзі сюды, дам яечаньку, абараначку!).

== See also ==
- Domovoy
- Brownie
