= Colo Colo (mythology) =

Creature from Mapuche mythology

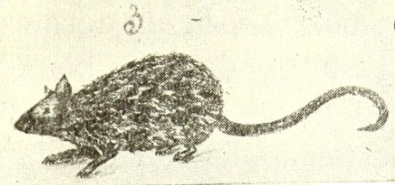
Sketch of the Colocolo accompanying commentary on the Araucan (Mapuche) myth

The Colo Colo or Colocolo is an evil rat-like creature from Mapuche mythology.

The Colo Colo is reputed to nest near a residence and sneak in, drinking blood from a sleeping resident, extracting saliva or licking utensils, causing debilitating weakness or tuberculosis.

It is often said to hatch from a stunted-looking "rooster's egg", and the young resembles a snake or burrowing lizard, but it later metamorphoses into a feathered rat form.

A type of wildcat is also called "colocolo", and this may perhaps be related to the origin of the lore.

== Legend ==
According to Mapuche legend, the Colo Colo is a bloodthirsty animal (Note: "animal sanguinario".) which begins its life first as a hen's egg (or a rooster's egg by popular belief), and then as a snake or lizard that hatches out when the baking sun's heat is sufficient during incubation. Then after some time, it metamorphoses (Note: "metamorfosea".) into a creature like a feathered rat. The suspicious egg would be stunted or too small to come from a hen, so both the indigenous people and locals believe it must have been laid by a rooster. (Note: Guevara Historia I: 230 apud Vicuña; (=Guevara (1899) Ch. VIII)

The Colo Colo dwells in caves near people's houses and invades homes (in some versions of the myth, it hides in a house as a newborn hatchling). It then feeds on the saliva of the residents and licks their used utensils. Due to this the family will contract pulmonary tuberculosis (Note: Spanish: consunción in Guevara and tisis in Moesbach (1976) [1944].) and eventually die. Some sort of sympathetic magic (Note: "mágica simpática".) is said to be at work. Whenever a suspected rooster egg is found, it is customary to burn it.

Indicators that a Colo Colo is in a house are residents feeling tired for no reason or hearing its cry, which is similar to an infant wailing. When it is suspected that a Colo Colo is in the house, a Machi must be contacted to exorcise the premises. Sometimes the only remedy is burning the building in order to kill the Colo Colo.

=== Local urban lore ===
Julio Vicuña Cifuentes published the data on the Colo Colo lore in urbanized areas from Valparaíso to Concepción (northern coast to central Chile), including the capital city of Santiago.

In the north, the Colo Colo is said to suck blood from people while they are asleep. (lore "a" from La Serena) (Note: La Serena being 400 kilometres (250 mi) north of Santiago)

At the capital or in the Santiago Metropolitan Region, the Colo Colo nests near someone's residence and drinks the saliva of one person repeatedly, who suffers worsening weakness and disfigurement to the point of death, unless this is interrupted by eradicating the pest (lore "b" of Santiago.) In Talagante, the Colo Colo is said to be a black bird the size of a chercán (Northern house wren) whose saliva-drinking is immediately fatal (lore "c" of Malloco).

At locations near Concepción (451 kilometres (280 mi) south of the capital) but more inland, (Note: Cauquenes in the Maule Region and Coihueco and Coelemu in the Ñuble Region are 350, 360, and 500 kilometres (220, 220, and 310 mi), respectively southward of the capital distance-wise.) the Colo Colo is said to be a small bird similar to a bat, that enters rooms at night and sucks the saliva of its victims until their death (lore "d" of Quella in Cauquenes). Alternatively, it is also known as a little mouse whose drinking of saliva or eating of leftovers will make person fatally ill. (lore "e" of Coihueco de Chillán). Others claim it is an unseen evil animal whose cries sound like, "colo-colo" and drinking of saliva causes death by fever and/or tuberculosis (lore "f" of Coelemu). This is most common version in the Valparaíso–Concepción parts of Chile. (Note: As there were 27 other testimonies from that range, of which 5 were identical with f), 22 were the same except lacking the reference to its call. Some gave quantitative measurements, mostly in the range of a small mouse.)

In the southern Llanquihue and Valdivia regions, the Colo Colo is said to be a subterranean lizard hatched from an underdeveloped egg (called rooster's egg), which kills humans by extracting their saliva.

== Fauna identification ==
Rodolfo Lenz's dictionary (1904) lists it as a mountain cat, i.e. Felis colocolo, commonly called "colocolo". (Note: Lenz cited by Vicuña.) According to Agustín Edwards Mac-Clure, colocolo used to signify an extinct or vanishing species of "catamountain" (wildcat), which folklore transformed into a lizard that burrows underground. "Coloco" is listed as a common name for the Pampas cat, which naturally hybridizes with other species.

The marsupial monito del monte is also called by the common name "colocolo", but the monotypic Dromiciops may just have been named from the onomatopoeia of its crying call, otherwise described as sounding like tzchí, tzchii, or kod-kod. (Note: Cabrera & Yepes (1960) p. 46 apud Chicago Natural History Museum (1945) "Fam. Diprotodontidae". Fieldiana: Geology, p. 46)

== See also ==
- Machi (shaman)
- Mapuche
- Mapuche religion
