= Olle af Klintberg =

Swedish folk musician

Olle af Klintberg is a male folk musician from Sweden who is best known for playing the fiddle, and for winning the national title of Årets Näck in 2010.

Olle also appeared on TV4's Talang on 23 April 2010, when he also portrayed the Näcken by sitting on a rock surrounded by blue water, and water lilies in his hair. He played the violin and sang a verse from Näcken, a poem by Erik Johan Stagnelius. Judges Bert Karlsson and Charlotte Perrelli voted against Olle, while Johan Pråmell voted for him.

Olle has also previously participated in Flottkalaset in a few past years, as a member of Orkester Semester.
