= Årets Näck =

Årets Näck (Nix of the year) is an annual competition to select the year's incarnation of Näcken, a male fairy creature in Sweden. The competition takes place at the Tannery Holmen located in Billstaån, Hackås, Berg Municipality, in southern Jämtland. The contest is part of Hackåsdagarna (Hackås Days), a festival organized by the Hackås District Foundation.

The contestants for the Årets Näck title compete by sitting or standing in the river while virtually nude and playing an instrument (typically the violin) to portray the Nix. Participants have also competed a cappella, on drum, or on accordion. In 2009, the competition was atypically won by a saxophone player, Martin Norberg.

== Rules of the competition ==
1. The competition is open only to male musicians.
2. The contestant may only cover himself with things that he can find in nature.
3. A musical work will be played by each participant, either a traditional piece or newly composed. It should be performed on a "magically" tuned violin.
4. The order of competitors will be decided by a random drawing at the music café at Strömbacka Mill prior to the contest.
5. A three-man jury of two people skilled in folk music and a non-folk-musician female judge score the contestants according to the following criteria: musical performance, charisma and convincingness. After deliberation the jury announces the results, which can not be appealed.
6. The winner receives a priceless handwritten certificate and SEK 2,000 (increased from 2004).
7. The winner of each of the three selection criteria receives SEK 500 in premiums (in 1998).
8. Since 2004, there has also been a crowd's prize awarded of SEK 500.

== Past winners ==
Year	Winner	Number of competitors
1995	Werner Gladh	4
1996	Werner Gladh	5
1997	Peter Roos	7
1998	Peter Roos	6
1999	Pelle Bolander	9
2000	Anders Hall	8
2001	Werner Gladh	5
2002	Joel Berglund	3
2003	Daniel Wikslund	5
2004	Joel Berglund	7
2005	Joel Berglund	5
2006	Joel Berglund	not recorded
2007	Sten Andersson	5
2008	Ross Campbell (Ahmadabad – U.S.)	6
2009	Martin Norberg	4
2010	Olle af Klintberg	6
2011	Samuel Lundström	5
2012	Samuel Lundström	unknown
2013	Tomas Flossman	unknown

== Related ==
On 23 April 2010, Olle af Klintberg appeared on TV4's Talang, Sweden's "Got Talent" show. In that episode, when the curtains opened, Olle was portraying the Näcken by sitting on a rock with blue cloth on the floor to represent water, and water lilies placed around the stone and in his hair. He played the violin and sang a verse from "Näcken", a poem by Erik Johan Stagnelius. Judges Bert Karlsson and Charlotte Perrelli voted against Olle, while Johan Pråmell voted for him.
