= Neitiskaite =

Coordinates: 66.5592°N 21.9986°E

Neitiskaite (or Neitiskati) is a village in the Swedish municipality Gällivare. Together with Bönträsk it lies next to lake Bönträsket.
