= Serenad =

Song by Jean Sibelius (1895)

- Orchestral song by Jean Sibelius
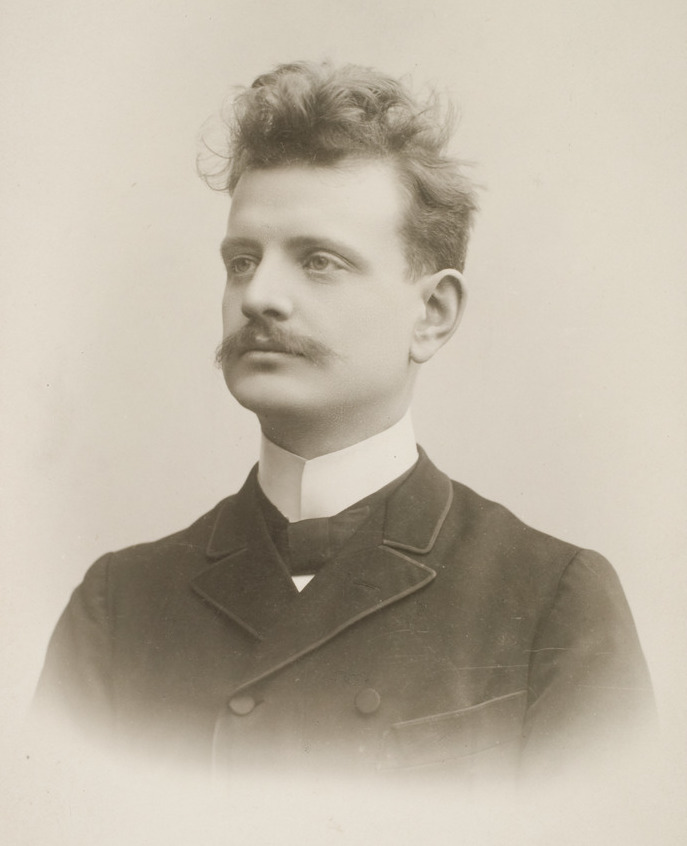
- The composer (c. 1895)
- Catalogue: JS 168
- Text: Serenad by Stagnelius
- Language: Swedish
- Composed: c. 1894–1895
- Duration: 4.5 mins.

Premiere
- Date: 17 April 1895
- Location: Helsinki, Grand Duchy of Finland
- Conductor: Jean Sibelius
- Performers: Abraham Ojanperä (baritone); Helsinki Philharmonic Society

"Serenad" (in English: "Serenade"; in Finnish: "Serenadi"), (Note: Because Sibelius's JS 168 song is sung in Swedish, this article gives preference to its native title, rather than the English translation.) JS 168, is an art song for baritone and orchestra written in c. 1894–1895 by the Finnish composer Jean Sibelius. The piece, which is a setting of the eponymous poem by the Swedish poet Erik Johan Stagnelius, premiered on 17 April in Helsinki, with Sibelius conducting the Helsinki Philharmonic Society; the soloist was the Finnish baritone Abraham Ojanperä.

The "Serenad", however, remained unpublished and was never performed again in Sibelius's lifetime, apparently because he wished to revise it (however, a planned revision in 1910 never materialized). In 1984, however, the composer's estate agreed to permit its recording. The song was first published in Volume VIII/1 of the Jean Sibelius Works (JSW) critical edition, an ongoing collaborative project involving the National Library of Finland, the German firm of Breitkopf & Härtel, and the Sibelius Society of Finland.

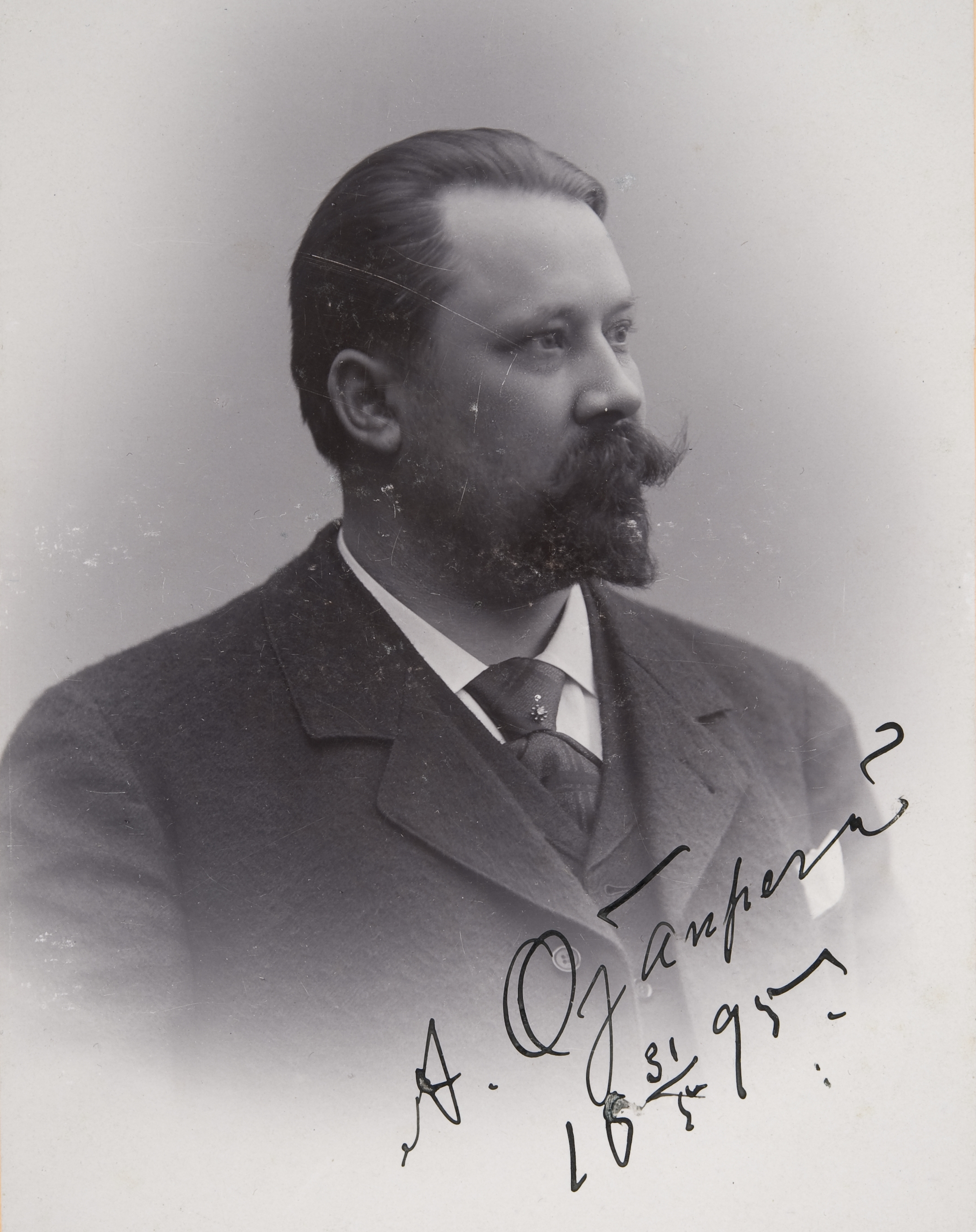
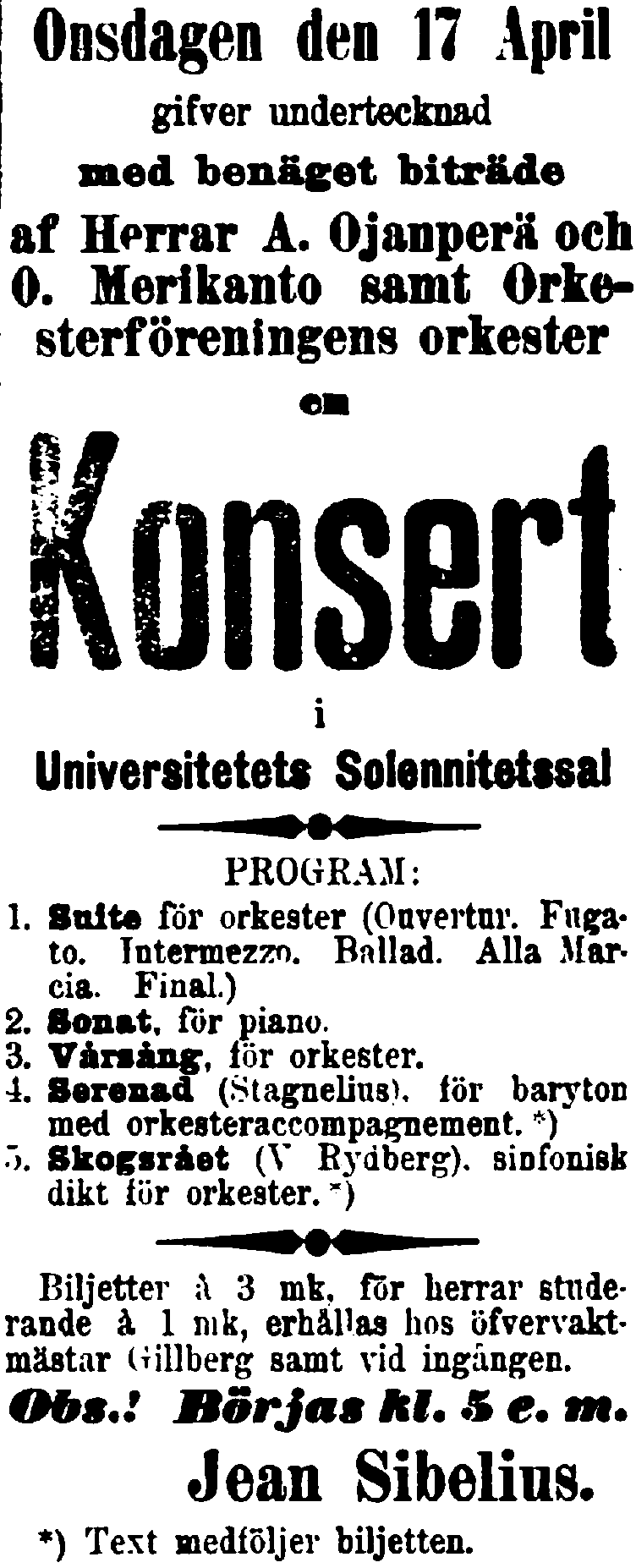
The Finnish baritone Abraham Ojanperä (left) premiered Sibelius's "Serenad" on 17 April 1895 in Helsinki (ad right).

== Instrumentation ==
The "Serenad" is scored for the following instruments and voices, organized by family (vocalists, woodwinds, brass, and strings):

- Baritone
- 2 oboes, 2 clarinets, and 2 bassoons
- 4 horns
- Violins (I and II), violas, cellos, and double basses

== Reception ==
The British musicologist Robert Layton has praised the "Serenad" as "something of a discovery ... it has the greatest delicacy and atmosphere, and its whispering pizzicato strings are wonderfully suggestive". He concludes by labeling it as "one of Sibelius's very greatest and most subtle songs both in its use of rhythm and color". The Sibelius biographer Andrew Barnett characterizes the "Serenad" as a "nocturnal lament for [one's] lost love", the chromaticism of which illustrates the extent to which still in the mid-1890s, Sibelius was under Wagner's spell.

== Discography ==
External audio
- Sung by Jorma Hynninen, accompanied by Jorma Panula and the Gothenburg Symphony Orchestra
- JS 168, "Serenad"

The Finnish conductor Jorma Panula and the Gothenburg Symphony Orchestra, joined by the Finnish baritone Jorma Hynninen, made the world premiere studio recording of the "Serenad" in 1984 for BIS. The table below lists this and other commercially available recordings:

No.	Soloist	Conductor	Orchestra	Rec. (Note: Refers to the year in which the performers recorded the work; this may not be the same as the year in which the recording was first released to the general public.)	Time	Recording venue	Label	Ref.
1	Jorma Hynninen	Jorma Panula	Gothenburg Symphony Orchestra	1984	4:39	Gothenburg Concert Hall	BIS	(Note: J. Panula—BIS (CD–270) 1985)
2	Tommi Hakala	Osmo Vänskä	Lahti Symphony Orchestra	2005	5:47	Sibelius Hall	BIS	(Note: O. Vänskä—BIS (CD–1565) 2006)

== Notes, references, and sources ==
=== Sources ===
- Barnett, Andrew (2007). Sibelius. New Haven, Connecticut: Yale University Press. ISBN 978-0-300-16397-1.
- Dahlström, Fabian [in Swedish] (2003). Jean Sibelius: Thematisch-bibliographisches Verzeichnis seiner Werke [Jean Sibelius: A Thematic Bibliographic Index of His Works] (in German). Wiesbaden: Breitkopf & Härtel. ISBN 3-7651-0333-0.
- Layton, Robert (1993) [1965]. Sibelius. (The Master Musicians Series) (4th ed.). New York: Schirmer Books. ISBN 0028713222.
