= Tjautjas =

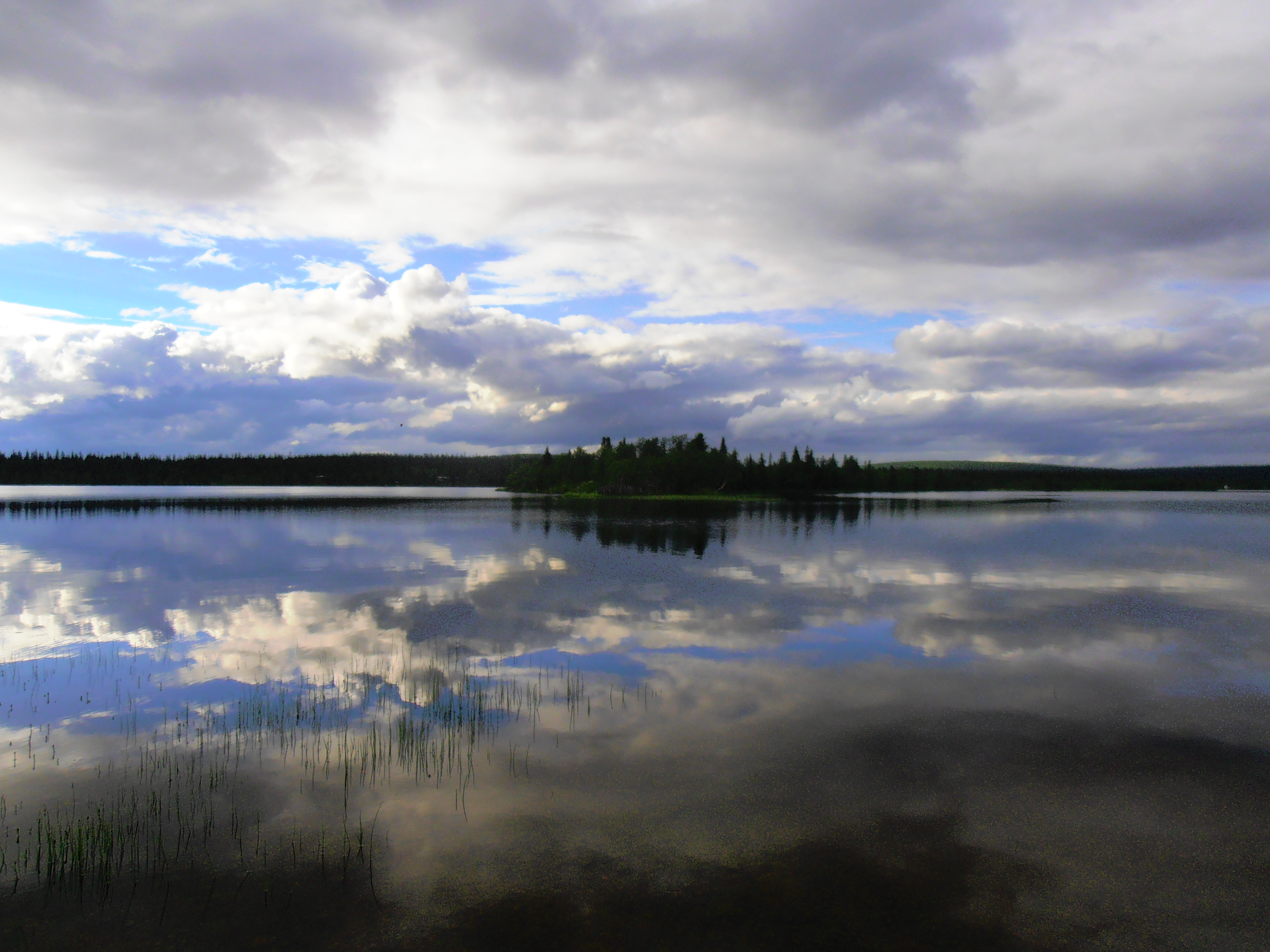

- Location within Norrbotten Location within Sweden
- Coordinates: 67°19′N 20°44′E
- Country: Sweden
- Province: Lapland
- County: Norrbotten County
- Municipality: Gällivare Municipality

Area
  - Total: 0.64 km^{2} (0.25 sq mi)

Population (31 December 2010)
  - Total: 234
  - Density: 367/km^{2} (950/sq mi)
- Time zone: UTC+1 (CET)
  - Summer (DST): UTC+2 (CEST)

Tjautjas (sometimes called Tjautjasjaure or Čavččas in Northern Sámi) is a locality situated in Gällivare Municipality, Norrbotten County, Sweden with 234 inhabitants in 2010.

Tjautjas is located 20 kilometers north-east of Koskullskulle and can only be reached through that village.

Tjautjas hosts an annual festival each year in August called Flottkalaset, a music and cultural event featuring folk musicians from all over Sweden along with other types of performers such as acrobats, jugglers, and clowns.
