= Sangervaara =

Coordinates: 66.9294°N 21.5472°E

Sangervaara is a village and hill (398 meters high) in the Swedish municipality Gällivare.

It's a rounded elevation of limited extent rising above the surrounding land with local relief of less than 300m.
