= Hakkas, Sweden =

Hakkas
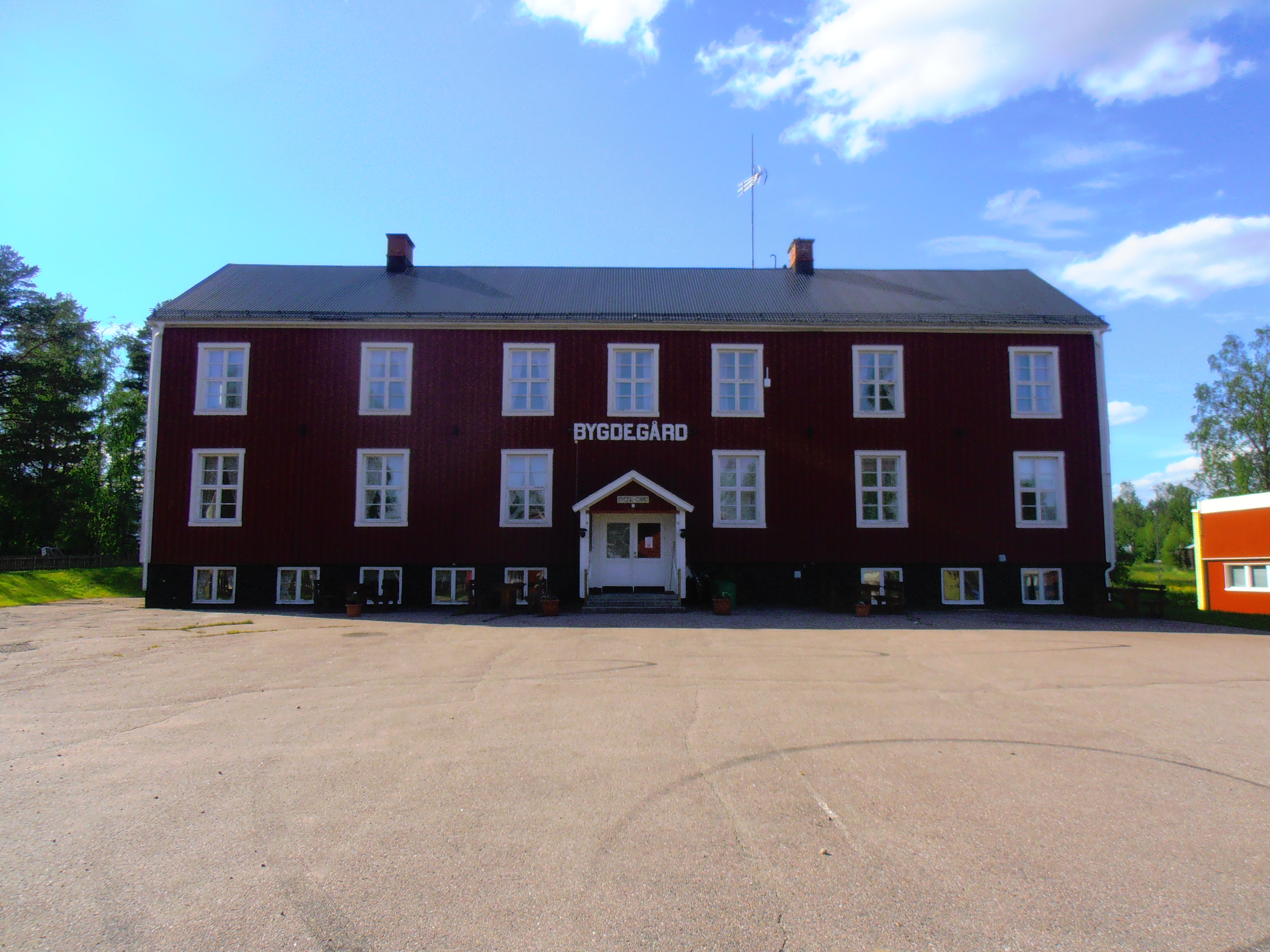

- Location within Norrbotten Location within Sweden
- Coordinates: 66°55′N 21°33′E
- Country: Sweden
- Province: Lapland
- County: Norrbotten County
- Municipality: Gällivare Municipality

Area
  - Total: 1.51 km^{2} (0.58 sq mi)

Population (31 December 2010)
  - Total: 365
  - Density: 242/km^{2} (630/sq mi)
- Time zone: UTC+1 (CET)
  - Summer (DST): UTC+2 (CEST)

Hakkas is a locality situated in Gällivare Municipality, Norrbotten County, Sweden with 365 inhabitants in 2010.
