= Kääntöjärvi =

Coordinates: 67°23′N 21°50′E

Kääntöjärvi is a minor village in Gällivare Municipality in Norrbotten County, Sweden.
