= Ullatti =

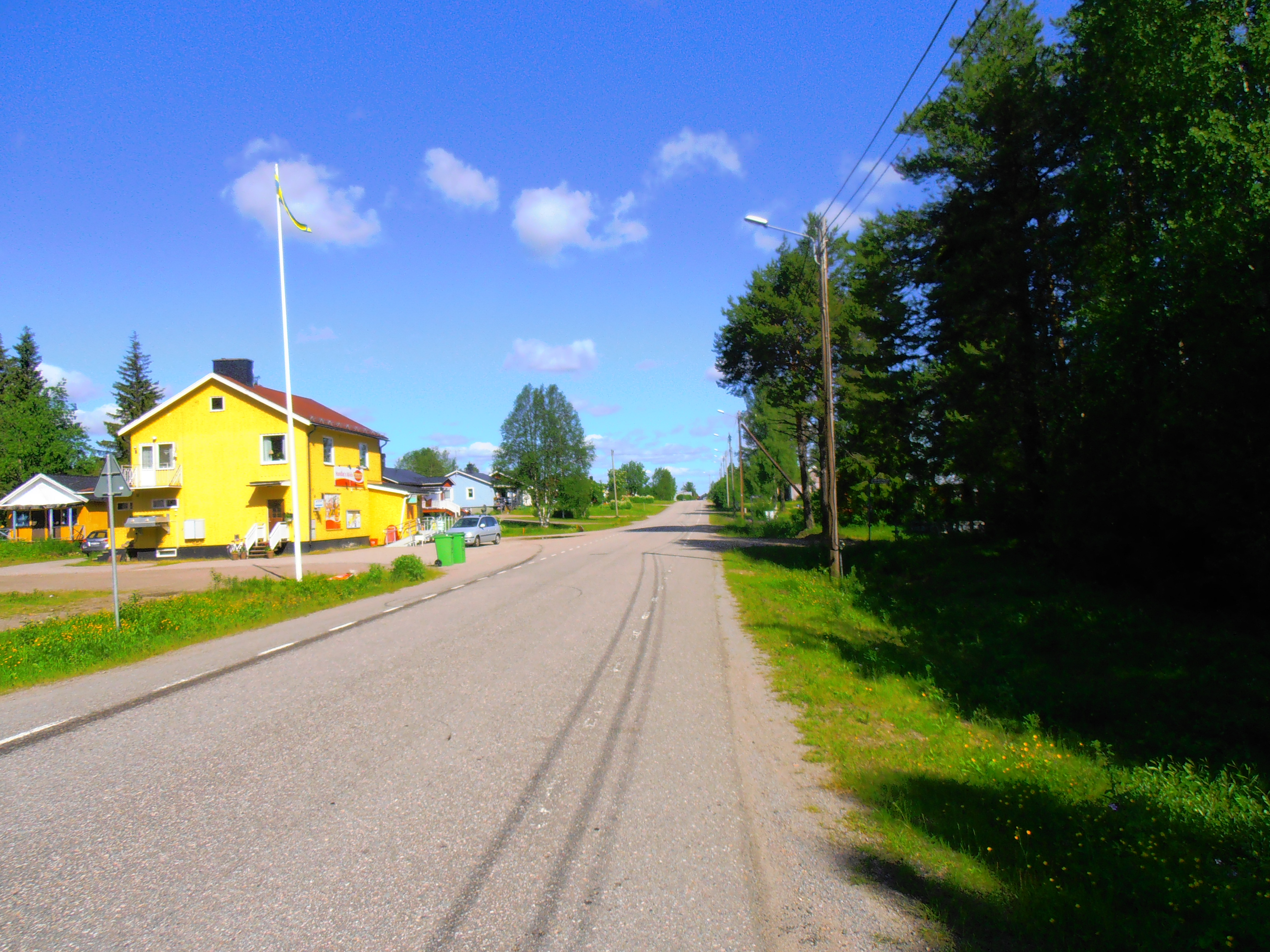

- Location within Norrbotten Location within Sweden
- Coordinates: 67°01′N 21°49′E
- Country: Sweden
- Province: Lapland
- County: Norrbotten County
- Municipality: Gällivare Municipality

Area
  - Total: 1.57 km^{2} (0.61 sq mi)

Population (31 December 2010)
  - Total: 213
  - Density: 135/km^{2} (350/sq mi)
- Time zone: UTC+1 (CET)
  - Summer (DST): UTC+2 (CEST)

Ullatti is a locality situated in Gällivare Municipality, Norrbotten County, Sweden. In 2010 it had 213 inhabitants.
