= Flakaberg =

Coordinates: 66.519°N 21.906°E

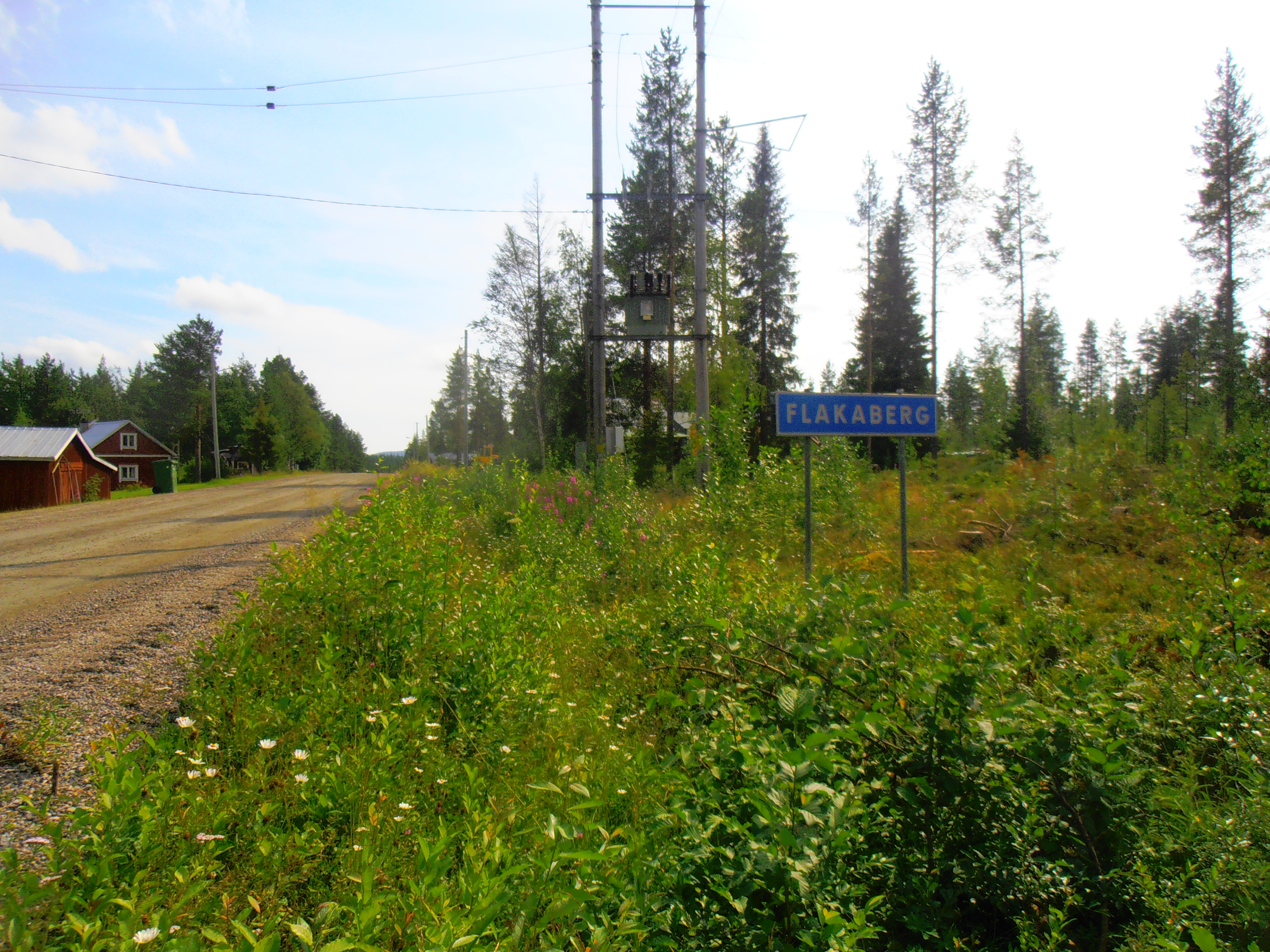
Flakaberg, July 2016

Flakaberg is a village in the Swedish municipality Gällivare on the border with the municipality of Boden. It lies on the slope of the Flakaberget.
