= Flottkalaset =

Coordinates: 67.3278°N 20.7283°E

- Genre: Folk
- Dates: August
- Locations: Tjautjas, Sweden
- Years active: 2009 - present
- Founders: Daniel Wikslund
- Website: Flottkalaset

Flottkalaset (Raft Festival) is an annual music festival and cultural event held in Tjautjas in the Gällivare Municipality region in northern Sweden. The event was envisioned and organized by Riksspelman Daniel Wikslund, a noted Swedish folk musician. The two-day festival takes place in August on an island in the middle of a mountain lake, accessible via rafts or by walking across a raft bridge.

== History ==
Daniel Wikslund settled in Tjautjas after being drawn there by nostalgic memories of his grandmother who had lived there. After being accepted by the village, he celebrated in 2009 by hosting a "housewarming party" that featured many of his folk musician friends. The event was successful and grew in subsequent years with the help of cultural arts funding. Daniel had earlier built a cabin upon a raft that floats in the lake, and it is the iconic symbol of the festival.

The festival initially had around 400 attendees the first year, but has since grown to 1,000.
