= Leipojärvi =

Village in northern Sweden

Coordinates: 67°03′00″N 21°13′00″E

Leipojärvi (Swedish)
- Village
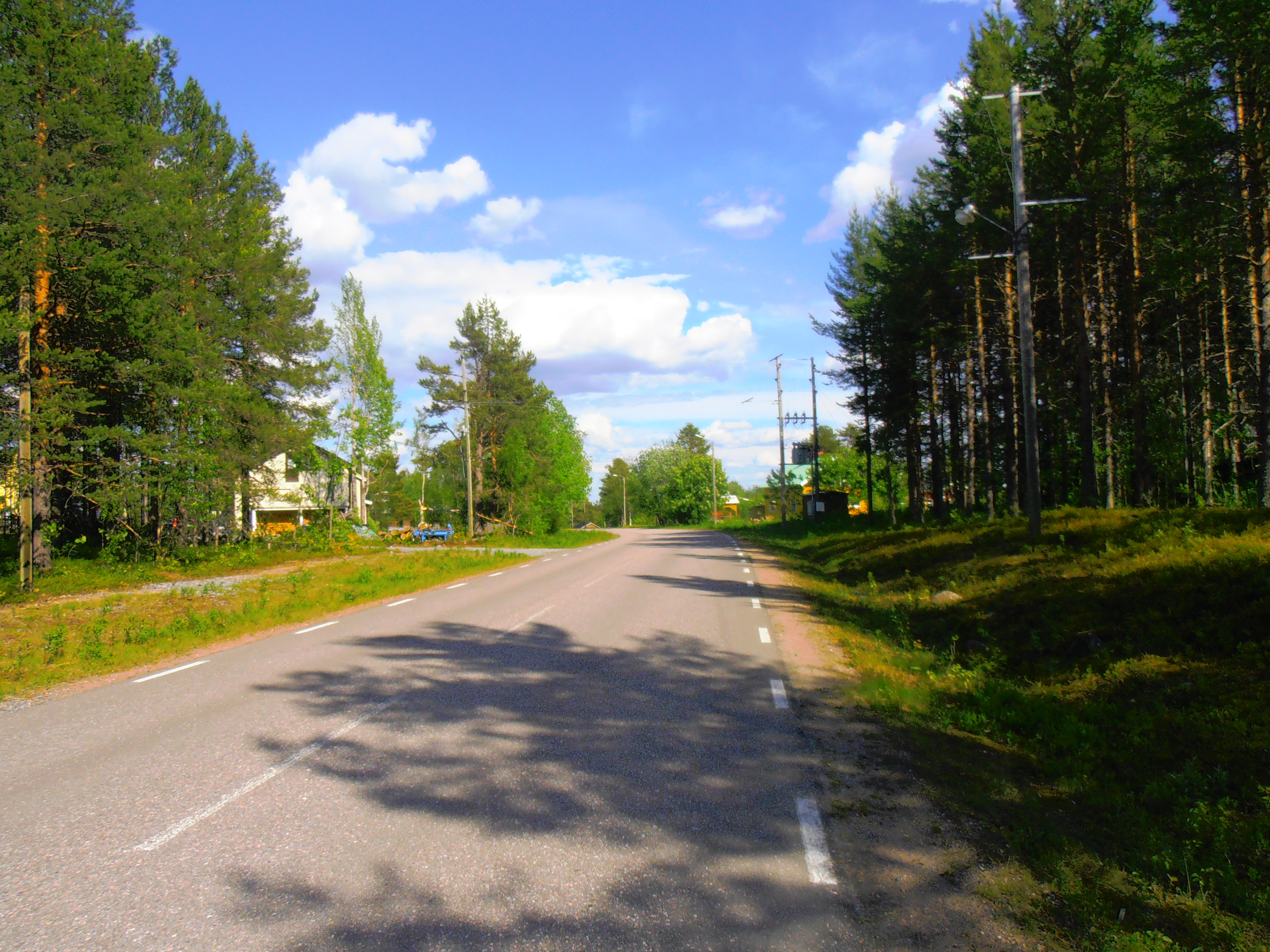
- The entrance to Leipojärvi, Gällivare municipality

- Location within Norrbotten Location within Sweden
- Country: Sweden
- Municipality: Gällivare Municipality
- County: Norrbotten County
- Province: Lappland
- Time zone: UTC+1 (CET)
  - Summer (DST): CEST

Leipojärvi is a small town, or village, in Gällivare municipality, Norrbotten County, Sweden. The town or village is located by Lake Ala-Leipojärvi and is located 26 kilometers southeast of Gällivare, near the crossroads where County Road 394 leaves from E10. The village is part of the Dokkas region in the eastern part of Gällivare municipality. In addition to Leipojärvi, there are also the villages of Mettä-Dokkas, Dokkas, Nilivaara and Vettasjärvi in the Dokkas region.
