= Koskullskulle =

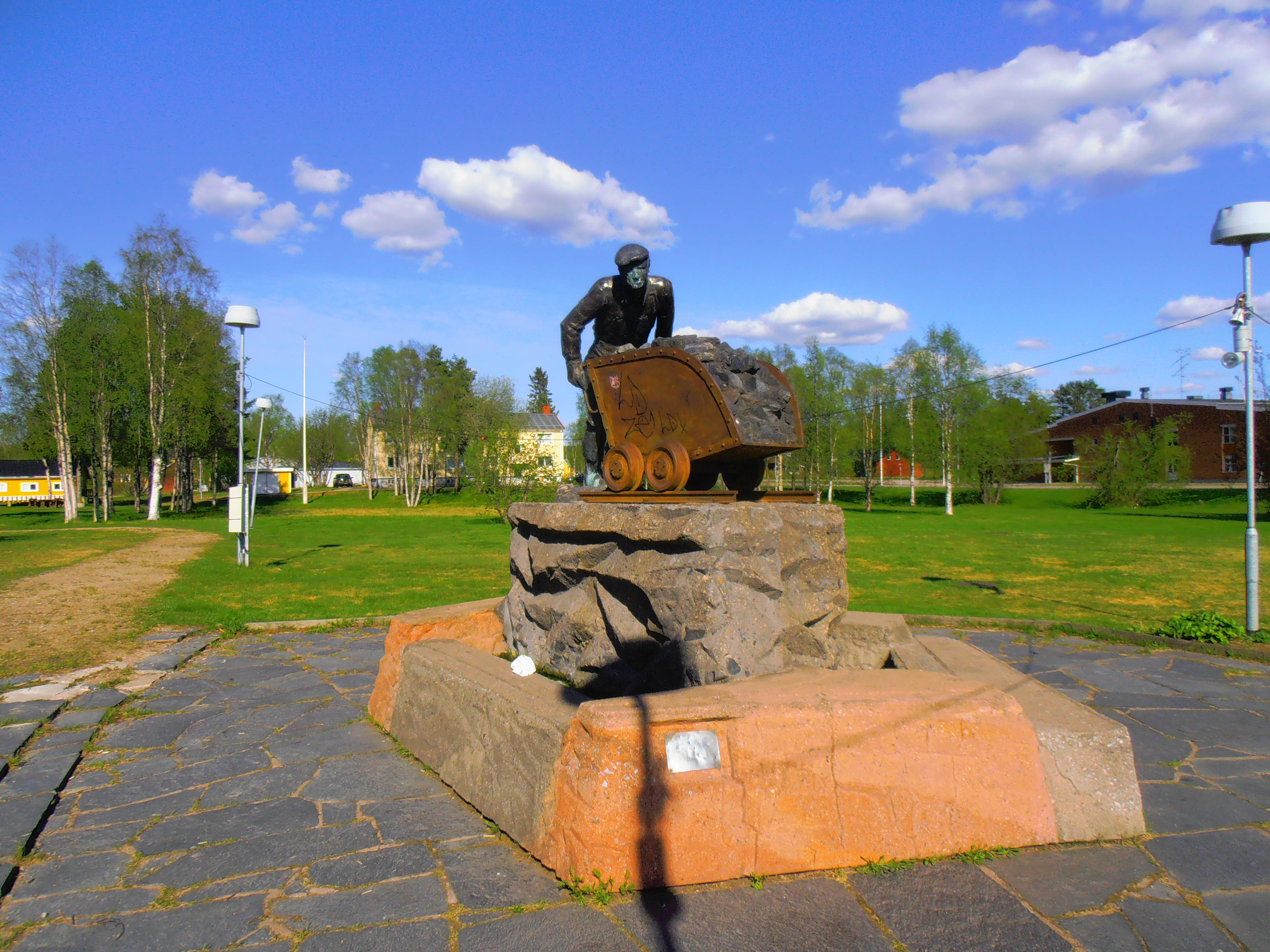

- Location within Norrbotten Location within Sweden
- Coordinates: 67°12′N 20°50′E
- Country: Sweden
- Province: Lapland
- County: Norrbotten County
- Municipality: Gällivare Municipality

Area
  - Total: 2.78 km^{2} (1.07 sq mi)

Population (31 December 2010)
  - Total: 874
  - Density: 314/km^{2} (810/sq mi)
- Time zone: UTC+1 (CET)
  - Summer (DST): UTC+2 (CEST)

Koskullskulle is a locality situated in Gällivare Municipality, Norrbotten County, Sweden with 874 inhabitants in 2010.

It was founded in 1898 when iron ore was discovered. The village got its name from Georg Adolf Koskull who was governor of Norrbotten County 1816–1821.

The iron ore mine situated north of the village is called the Vitåfors mine.
