= Gällivare Municipality =

Gällivare Municipality Gällivare kommun
- Municipality
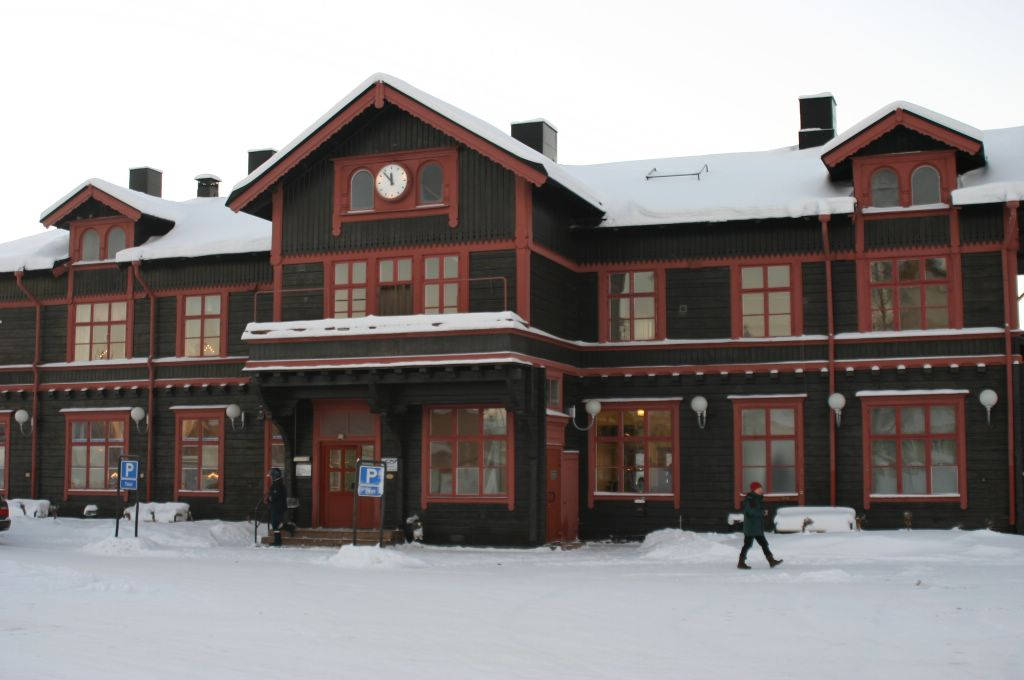
- Gällivare Railway Station

- Coat of arms

- Coordinates: 67°07′N 20°45′E
- Country: Sweden
- County: Norrbotten County
- Seat: Gällivare

Area
  - Total: 16,818.22 km^{2} (6,493.55 sq mi)
  - Land: 15,705.15 km^{2} (6,063.79 sq mi)
  - Water: 1,113.07 km^{2} (429.76 sq mi)
- Area as of 1 January 2014.

Population (30 June 2025)
  - Total: 17,195
  - Density: 1.0949/km^{2} (2.8357/sq mi)
- Time zone: UTC+1 (CET)
  - Summer (DST): UTC+2 (CEST)
- ISO 3166 code: SE
- Province: Lapland
- Municipal code: 2523
- Website: www.gellivare.se

Gällivare Municipality (Swedish: Gällivare kommun; Northern Sami: Jiellevárri gielda or Váhčira gielda; Meänkieli: Jellivaaran kunta; Finnish: Jällivaaran kunta) is a municipality in Norrbotten County in northern Sweden. Its seat is Gällivare. It is the third largest municipality in Sweden. Gällivare Lapland Airport is the only airport in the region able to accommodate commercial fixed-wing aircraft; as such, it is a popular destination for hikers wishing to visit the Sarek and Padjelanta national parks.

== Localities and settlements ==
The Sámi Church in Gällivare.

There are six localities (or urban areas) in Gällivare Municipality:

#	Locality	Population
1	**Gällivare**	8,480
2	Malmberget	6,017
3	Koskullskulle	899
4	Hakkas	383
5	Ullatti	230
6	Tjautjas/Čavččas	216

The municipal seat in bold

=== Other settlements ===
- Flakaberg
- Kääntöjärvi
- Sangervaara
- Leipojärvi

== Demographics ==
This is a demographic table based on Gällivare Municipality's electoral districts in the sourced from SVT's election platform, in turn taken from SCB official statistics.

Electoral districts for the 2022 Swedish general election reported a population of 17,434 residents, including 13,652 Swedish citizens of voting age. 53.0% voted for the left coalition and 45.8% for the right coalition. Median income is high compared to other municipalities in the region, primarily due to a large mining industry in the area. Indicators are in percentage form with the exception of population totals and income.

Location	Residents	Citizen adults	Left vote	Right vote	Employed	Swedish parents	Foreign heritage	Income SEK	Degree
Location			%	%					
Dundret	1,189	991	46.1	52.0	87	84	16	31,779	32
Gällivare C	2,067	1,690	57.7	41.3	82	80	20	24,507	23
Gällivare N	920	808	61.9	36.3	81	92	8	23,559	20
Gällivare S	1,682	1,400	47.3	51.1	85	91	9	24,855	17
Gällivare V	1,138	889	54.1	45.5	91	93	7	33,467	36
Heden	2,317	1,750	55.4	44.2	91	93	7	32,511	34
Koskullskulle	2,318	1,648	50.2	48.8	85	85	15	31,294	25
Maria	1,256	965	53.2	45.4	86	85	15	27,833	34
Mellanområdet	2,464	1,864	53.0	46.1	91	93	7	32,542	28
Sjöparken	2,083	1,647	54.3	44.4	84	86	14	28,206	29
Source: SVT

== Elections ==
=== Riksdag ===
"Turnout" denotes the percentage of eligible voters casting any ballots, whereas "Votes" denotes the number of actual valid ballots cast.

Year	Turnout	Votes	V	S	MP	C	L	KD	M	SD	ND	NP/SP
1973	86.6	14,719	20.7	48.8	0.0	13.5	3.6	0.7	10.6	0.0	0.0	0.0
1976	87.0	15,619	17.8	51.5	0.0	14.0	4.8	0.8	9.5	0.0	0.0	0.0
1979	87.0	15,699	15.7	53.9	0.0	9.1	4.7	0.9	11.3	0.0	0.0	0.0
1982	87.7	16,008	16.5	58.0	0.8	7.2	1.9	1.2	12.4	0.0	0.0	0.0
1985	85.4	15,443	18.1	56.6	0.6	5.7	6.0	0.0	11.9	0.0	0.0	0.0
1988	79.6	14,065	16.8	57.0	3.6	4.9	5.2	1.4	9.1	0.0	0.0	0.0
1991	79.2	13,510	15.6	55.5	2.2	4.0	5.0	3.2	11.0	0.0	2.4	0.0
1994	83.4	14,213	17.4	60.3	3.3	2.5	3.0	1.6	9.9	0.0	0.4	0.0
1998	77.1	12,507	33.5	43.2	3.2	1.7	1.9	4.6	10.6	0.0	0.0	0.0
2002	75.5	11,484	16.6	41.9	4.8	1.8	3.9	3.4	7.0	0.8	0.0	18.3
2006	76.9	11,420	17.8	52.8	2.9	2.6	2.4	2.8	11.9	2.4	0.0	2.2
2010	80.6	12,000	13.6	55.9	3.8	1.7	2.3	2.4	14.2	5.0	0.0	0.0
2014	82.2	12,108	11.6	50.5	4.2	1.8	1.4	2.3	10.8	15.2	0.0	0.0

Blocs

Year	Turnout	Votes	Left	Right	SD	Other	Elected
1973	86.6	14,719	**69.5**	27.7	0.0	2.8	97.2
1976	87.0	15,619	69.3	**28.3**	0.0	2.4	97.6
1979	87.0	15,699	69.6	**25.3**	0.0	5.1	94.9
1982	87.7	16,008	**74.5**	21.5	0.0	4.0	96.0
1985	85.4	15,443	**74.7**	23.6	0.0	1.7	98.3
1988	79.6	14,065	**77.4**	19.2	0.0	3.4	96.6
1991	79.2	13,510	71.1	**23.2**	0.0	5.7	96.7
1994	83.4	14,213	**81.0**	17.0	0.0	2.0	98.0
1998	77.1	12,507	**79.9**	18.8	0.0	1.3	98.7
2002	75.5	11,484	**63.3**	16.1	0.0	21.6	79.4
2006	76.9	11,420	73.5	**19.7**	0.0	6.8	93.2
2010	80.6	12,000	73.3	**20.6**	5.0	1.1	98.9
2014	82.2	12,108	**66.3**	16.3	15.2	2.2	97.8

== Sister cities ==
Gällivare Municipality has four sister cities:

- Tysfjord, Norway
- Kittilä, Finland
- Kirovsk, Russia
- Barga, Italy
