= Erik Johan Stagnelius =

Swedish poet and playwright

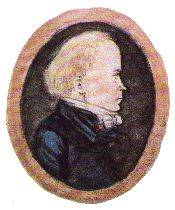
This drawing is often used to depict Stagnelius's peculiar appearance, although it may be exaggerated.

Erik Johan Stagnelius (14 October 1793 – 3 April 1823) was a Swedish Romantic poet, playwright and romantic critic of political economy.

1810 to 1840 was a time of blossoming in Swedish poetry, and there were several writers of distinguished merit, among them Esaias Tegnér, Erik Gustaf Geijer, Per Daniel Amadeus Atterbom and Stagnelius. The brief and mysterious life and death of Erik Johan Stagnelius have given a romantic interest to all that is connected with his name.

== Life ==
Stagnelius was born in Gärdslösa, Öland, where his father was a vicar; he was later bishop in Kalmar on the nearby mainland, which probably influenced Stagnelius's spiritual thinking. He came from a large family. Stagnelius showed a natural gift for poetic writing from an early childhood.

He took his bachelor's degree from Uppsala University in 1814 and got an employment as a clerk in Stockholm. As a person he was said to have been unattractive and unkempt. A woman who knew him, said of his appearance "where in this shabby person lies the beauty which his poetry expresses?".

He was notably gloomy and lived alone for most of his life, although he seemed to flourish during brief visits to his home town. As he first arrived to Stockholm, he strived for success as a poet, but basically this did not come until after his death.

His first publication was the epic of Wladimir den store ('Vladimir the Great'; 1817); followed by the romantic poem Blenda. His singular dramas, Bacchanterna ('The Bacchantes'; 1822), Sigurd Ring, which was posthumous, and Martyrerna ('The Martyrs'; 1821), are esteemed by many critics to be his most original productions. His mystical lyrics, entitled Liljor i Saron ('Lilies in Sharon'; 1820), and his sonnets, which are best read in Swedish, may be recommended as among the most delicate products of the Scandinavian mind.

It is believed that he suffered a chronic physical condition (a side effect of his alleged intense alcohol consumption or possibly Noonan syndrome have been suggested by Swedish researchers) causing him increasing pain, and that he used opium as his main remedy. On the details of his life, little is known. He had only a few friends, and no female companionship. Following his death in Stockholm at the age of 29, no relatives were present at the funeral.

== Poetry ==
Stagnelius has been compared, and not improperly, to Shelley. Several of Stagnelius's poems were translated into English by Edmund Gosse (1886). The bulk of his poetry was found in a sack in his shabby apartment after his death. They were almost sent to be burnt, but were instead kept, and several are still appreciated today for their romantic and mystic/spiritual qualities. Perhaps the best known are the poem "Näcken," a romantic verse-based poem about the Nix; Till förruttnelsen ('For Decay') and Resa, Amanda, jag skall ('Travel, Amanda, I shall')

== Philosophy ==
His thinking, which is evident from his later works, is influenced by mystics and romantic philosophers. He was also partly influenced by gnostic beliefs. Not proper, perhaps, in the Christian 19th century Sweden, this possible belief has been thoroughly examined, and is believed to have originated by a reading of the Swedish translation of Ginza Rabba, the holy works of the Mandaeism, published as Adam's Book. Other persons whose works he read and were likely influences were Schelling, Jakob Böhme and Plato.
