= 1965 Birthday Honours =

Appointments by Queen Elizabeth II

The Queen's Birthday Honours 1965 were appointments in many of the Commonwealth realms of Queen Elizabeth II to various orders and honours to reward and highlight good works by citizens of those countries. The appointments were made to celebrate the official birthday of The Queen. The announcement date varies from year to year. The 1965 Queen's Birthday Honours were announced on 12 June for the United Kingdom, Australia, New Zealand, Sierra Leone, Jamaica, Trinidad and Tobago, Malawi, and the Gambia.

The recipients of honours are displayed here as they were styled before their new honour, and arranged by honour, with classes (Knight, Knight Grand Cross, etc.) and then divisions (Military, Civil, etc.) as appropriate.

== United Kingdom and Colonies ==
=== Life Peer ===
Baron

- Noel Gilroy Annan, OBE, Provost of King's College, Cambridge. University Lecturer in Politics since 1948.
- Richard Beeching. Formerly Chairman, British Railways Board.
- Sir Russell Claude Brock, MS, PRCS, President, Royal College of Surgeons of England.
- Sir Harold Roxbee Cox, lately Chairman, Council for Scientific and Industrial Research.
- Arnold Abraham Goodman, Solicitor. Senior Partner in Goodman, Derrick and Company. Chairman, Arts Council of Great Britain.
- Richard Ferdinand Kahn, CBE, Professor of Economics, University of Cambridge since 1951. Fellow of King's College, Cambridge.

=== Privy Councillor ===
- John Diamond, MP, Member of Parliament for the Blackley Division of Manchester, 1945–1951 and for Gloucester since 1957. Chief Secretary, HM Treasury since 1964.
- Horace Maybray King, MP, Member of Parliament for the Test Division of Southampton, 1950–1955, and for the Itchen Division since 1955. Chairman of Ways and Means and Deputy Speaker since October 1964.
- The Right Honourable Malcolm Newton, Baron Shepherd, Deputy Opposition Chief Whip, House of Lords, 1960; Deputy Speaker and subsequently Opposition Chief Whip, House of Lords. Captain of the Gentlemen-at-Arms and Government Chief Whip in the House of Lords since October 1964.

=== Knight Bachelor ===
- Felix Edward Aylmer Jones, OBE. For services to the Stage.
- Alderman Joseph Reginald Balmer, JP. For political and public services in Birmingham.
- Alderman Albert Edward Bennett, JP. For political and public services in Stoke-on-Trent.
- Robert John Formby Burrows, President, Law Society.
- James Davidson Stuart Cameron, CBE, TD, MD, FRCP.Ed, Consultant Physician, Edinburgh Royal Infirmary.
- Thomas Fife Clark, CBE, Director-General, Central Office of Information.
- Alderman Joseph Jackson Cleary, JP. For political and public services, in Liverpool.
- Alexander Bradshaw Clegg, Chief Education Officer, West Riding of Yorkshire.
- Alderman Jack Cohen, OBE, JP. For political and public services in Sunderland.
- Ronald Stuart Gumming, TD. Chairman, Scotch Whisky Association. Chairman, Distillers Company, Ltd. For services to export.
- Charles Sigmund Davis, CB, Legal Adviser and Solicitor, Ministry of Agriculture, Fisheries and Food and Ministry of Land and Natural Resources.
- Robert Meredydd Wynne-Edwards, CBE, DSO, MC, Chairman, Engineering Institutions Joint Council.
- William Geoffrey Fiske, CBE, Leader, Greater London Council. Lately Councillor, London County Council.
- Victor Gollancz, Publisher and Writer.
- George William Harriman, CBE, Chairman and Managing Director, British Motor Corporation. For services to export.
- Alderman Sidney Pearson Hill, BEM. For political and public services in Nottingham.
- Albert Henry Kennedy, Inspector General, Royal Ulster Constabulary.
- John Maurice Laing, Deputy Chairman and Managing Director, John Laing and Son, Ltd.
- Hector Ross MacLennan, MD, FRCP, President, Royal College of Obstetricians and Gynaecologists.
- James Martin, CBE, Managing Director and Chief Designer, Martin-Baker Aircraft Company, Ltd., Middlesex. For services to export and technology.
- Peter Brian Medawar, CBE, Director, National Institute for Medical Research.
- Maurice Philip Pariser, Alderman, Manchester City Council.
- Terence Charles Stuart Morrison-Scott, DSC, Director, British Museum (Natural History).
- Frederick Sidney Snow, CBE, Founder and Principal, Frederick S. Snow & Partners, Consulting Engineers.
- Donald Gresham Stokes, TD, Managing Director and Deputy Chairman, Leyland Motor Corporation. For services to export.
- Duncan Mackay Weatherstone, MC, TD, Lord Provost of Edinburgh.
- Benjamin Allen Williams, CBE. For public services in Cheshire.
- Alderman Henry Edward Wright, JP. For political and public services in Plymouth.
- Colonel Arthur Edwin Young, CMG, CVO, Commissioner of Police for the City of London.

State of Victoria

- Edward Leo Curtis, Lord Mayor of the City of Melbourne, State of Victoria.

State of South Australia

- Norman Lane Jude, lately Minister of Local Government, Minister of Roads and Minister of Railways, State of South Australia.

State of Western Australia

- Stanley Lewis Prescott, OBE, Vice-Chancellor, University of Western Australia, State of Western Australia.

Commonwealth Relations

- Cecil Geraint Ames, President of the Sierra Leone and Gambia Court of Appeal.
- Alec Drummond Ogilvie, formerly President of the Bengal Chamber of Commerce and of the Associated Chambers of Commerce of India.

Overseas Territories

- Arthur Eber Sydney Charles, CBE, Speaker, Legislative Council, Aden.
- Russell England CBE. For public services in the Bechuanaland Protectorate.
- Asa Hubert Pritchard. For public services in the Bahamas.
- Seewoosagur Ramgoolam, LRCP, MRCS, Premier and Minister of Finance, Mauritius.
- Nathaniel Henry Peniston Vesey, CBE For public services in Bermuda.

=== Order of the Bath ===
==== Knight Grand Cross of the Order of the Bath (GCB) ====
Military Division

Royal Navy

- Admiral Sir Varyl Cargill Begg, KCB, DSO, DSC.

Army

- General Sir Charles Jones, KCB, CBE, MC, ADC.(Gen.) (34845), Colonel Commandant Corps of Royal Engineers.

Royal Air Force

- Air Chief Marshal Sir William Laurence Mary MacDonald, KCB, CBE, DFC, ADC.

==== Knight Commander of the Order of the Bath (KCB) ====
Military Division

Royal Navy

- Vice Admiral John Fitzroy Duyland Bush, CB, DSC.
- Vice Admiral Raymond Shayle Hawkins, CB.

Army

- Lieutenant-General William Robert Macfarlane Drew, CB, CBE, QHP, MB, FRCP (52405), late Royal Army Medical Corps.
- Lieutenant-General Geoffrey Richard Desmond Fitzpatrick, CB, DSO, MBE, MC (53670), late Royal Armoured Corps. Colonel, The Royal Dragoons (1st Dragoons).

Royal Air Force

- Acting Air Marshal Thomas Öther Prickett, CB, DSO, DFC.

Civil Division

- Arthur Lucius Michael Cary, CB, Second Permanent Under-Secretary of State, Ministry of Defence (Royal Navy).
- Arnold William France, CB, Permanent Secretary, Ministry of Health.
- Sir Ronald Ernest German, CMG, Director-General, General Post Office.

==== Companion of the Order of the Bath (CB) ====
Military Division

Royal Navy

- Rear Admiral Joseph Leslie Blackham.
- Surgeon Rear Admiral Eric Dick Caldwell, QHP, MD, ChB.
- Rear Admiral John Gervase Beresford Cooke, DSC.
- Rear Admiral Hugh Richard Benest Janvrin, DSC.
- Rear Admiral Robert William Mayo, CBE.
- Rear Admiral Wilfred John Parker, OBE, DSC.
- Rear Admiral Hugh Gordon Henry Tracy, DSC.
- Rear Admiral John Garth-Watson.
- Rear Admiral Anthony Woodifield, CBE, MVO.

Army

- Major-General Robert George Victor FitzGeorge-Balfour, CBE, DSO, MC (53288), late Foot Guards.
- Major-General James Craw Barnetson, OBE, QHP, MB (41955), late Royal Army Medical Corps.
- Major-General Desmond Alexander Bruce Clarke, CBE (53615), late Royal Regiment of Artillery.
- Major-General James Arthur d'Avigdor-Goldsmid, OBE, MC (53668), late Royal Armoured Corps. Colonel, 4th/7th Royal Dragoon Guards.
- Major-General John Reid Holden, CBE, DSO (71215), late Royal Armoured Corps.
- Major-General Ronald Clarence Macdonald, DSO, OBE (52682), late Infantry. Colonel, The Royal Warwickshire Fusiliers.
- Major-General Roger Ellis Tudor St. John, MC (52703), late Infantry.
- Major-General Frederick Joseph Swainson, OBE (194065), late Royal Corps of Signals (now retired). Colonel Commandant, Royal Corps of Signals.
- Major-General Peter George Francis Young, CBE (53743), late Infantry.

Royal Air Force

- Air Vice-Marshal Richard Cecil Ayling, CBE.
- Air Vice-Marshal Peter Hamilton Holmes, OBE.
- Air Vice-Marshal James Edgar Johnson, CBE, DSO, DFC.
- The Venerable Wilfred Ernest Granville Payton, QHC.
- Air Commodore Henry Everard Crichton Boxer, OBE.
- Air Commodore Ernest Shaw Sidey, MD, ChB.
- Air Commodore Sidney George Walker, OBE.

Civil Division

- John Angus Beckett, CMG, Under-Secretary, Ministry of Power.
- Cyril Maxwell Palmer Brown, CMG, Second Secretary, Board of Trade.
- Ronald Kington Christy, HM Chief Inspector of Factories, Ministry of Labour.
- Eric William Eldridge, OBE, Public Trustee.
- Cyril James Gill, HM Chief Inspector, Department of Education & Science.
- Eric Edwin Haddon, Director, Chemical Defence Experimental Establishment, Ministry of Defence (Army).
- Ronald Clive Kent, Assistant Under-Secretary of State, Ministry of Defence (Central Staff).
- George Gray Macfarlane, Director, Royal Radar Establishment, Ministry of Aviation.
- Colonel Arthur Noble, DSO, TD, DL, Chairman, Territorial and Auxiliary Forces Association for the County of Essex.
- Douglas Overend, Under-Secretary, Ministry of Pensions & National Insurance.
- Kenneth Bruce Pepper, Commissioner, Board of Customs & Excise.
- John Ashworth Ratcliffe, CBE, Director, Radio & Space Research Station, Science Research Council.
- Philip Rogers, CMG, Deputy Secretary to the Cabinet.
- Frederick Robert Peter Vinter, Third Secretary, HM Treasury.
- Harry Whitby, Under-Secretary, Department of Agriculture & Fisheries for Scotland.

=== Order of Saint Michael and Saint George ===
==== Knight Grand Cross of the Order of St Michael and St George (GCMG) ====
- Sir Paul Henry Gore-Booth, KCMG, KCVO, lately British High Commissioner, New Delhi.
- Sir Humphrey Trevelyan, KCMG, CIE, OBE, Her Majesty's Ambassador Extraordinary and Plenipotentiary in Moscow.

==== Knight Commander of the Order of St Michael and St George (KCMG) ====
- Francis Alfred Loyd, CMG, OBE, Her Majesty's Commissioner, Swaziland.
- Richard Ashton Beaumont, CMG, OBE, Her Majesty's Ambassador Extraordinary and Plenipotentiary, in Rabat.
- William Leonard Dale, CMG, Legal Adviser, Commonwealth Relations Office.
- James Alexander Milne Marjoribanks, CMG, Head of the United Kingdom Delegation to the European Communities, Brussels.
- Eugene Melville, CMG, lately Minister (Economic), Her Majesty's Embassy, Bonn.
- William Bonnar Leslie Monson, CB, CMG, British High Commissioner, Lusaka.
- Edward Redston Warner, CMG, OBE, Her Majesty's Ambassador Extraordinary and Plenipotentiary in Yaoundé.

==== Dame Commander of the Order of St Michael and St George (DCMG) ====
- Margery Freda Perham, CBE. For services to the development of new countries in Africa.

==== Companion of the Order of St Michael and St George (CMG) ====
- George James Humphries, OBE, Director of Overseas (Geodetic & Topographic) Surveys, Ministry of Overseas Development.
- Eric Atkinson Midgley, MBE, Minister (Economic & Commercial) in India.
- Stanley Walden Payton, lately Governor, Bank of Jamaica.
- Professor John Henry Richardson. For services in industrial and wage disputes, in various oversea territories in the Commonwealth.
- Henry Moir Wilson, MBE, formerly Head of Defence Research and Development Staff, Washington, Ministry of Aviation. Now Deputy Chief Scientist, Ministry of Defence (Army).
- Valdemar Jens Andersen, OBE, VRD, Resident Commissioner, Gilbert and Ellice Islands Colony.
- Arthur John Alexander Douglas, OBE, Chief Secretary, Bechuanaland Protectorate.
- John Marcus Kisch, Assistant Secretary, Colonial Office, seconded to the Commonwealth Relations Office.
- William Stanley Morgan, Chairman, Public and Police Service Commissions, Mauritius.
- John Percival Morton, OBE, lately Security Intelligence Adviser, Colonial Office.
- Peter Granville Owen, Commissioner of Police, British Guiana.
- Jasper Augustine Peck, Assistant Legal Adviser to the Secretary of State for the Colonies.
- Patrick Cardinall Mason Sedgwick, Commissioner of Labour and Commissioner of Mines, Hong Kong.
- Leslie Clifford Bateman, Chief Executive, Malaya Rubber Board.
- James Reginald Alfred Bottomley, British Deputy High Commissioner, Kuala Lumpur.
- Peers Lee Carter, Inspector of Her Majesty's Diplomatic Service Establishments.
- John Nicholas Henderson, Foreign Office.
- John Robert Hilton, Foreign Office.
- Roland Charles Colin Hunt, British High Commissioner, Kampala.
- The Honourable Margaret Lambert, lately Editor-in-Chief, Special Historical Section, Foreign Office.
- Donald Arthur Logan, Counsellor (Information), Her Majesty's Embassy, Paris.
- Ian Innes Milne, OBE, Foreign Office.
- John Trevor Archdall Pearce, lately Permanent Secretary (Administration), Ministry of Local Government & Administration, Tanzania.
- John Fleetwood Stewart Phillips, Counsellor, Her Majesty's Embassy, Amman.
- Arthur Propper, MBE, lately Counsellor (Agriculture), United Kingdom Delegation to the European Communities, Brussels.
- Herbert John Roberts. For public services in Northern Rhodesia, 1954–1964.
- Ronald Stratford Scrivener, Foreign Office.
- Dermot Joseph Sheridan, Judge of the High Court of Uganda.
- Richard Adam Sykes, MC, Counsellor, Her Majesty's Embassy, Athens.
- Leonard John Dean Wakely, OBE, British Deputy High Commissioner, Ottawa.

State of Victoria

- Garrett Ernest Fitzgerald, President for the State of Victoria of the Australian Society of Accountants.

State of Queensland

- Roy Leslie Dunlop, Clerk of the Parliament, State of Queensland.

State of South Australia

- George Henry Padget Jeffery, Auditor-General, State of South Australia.

=== Royal Victorian Order ===
==== Knight Grand Cross of the Royal Victorian Order (GCVO) ====
- General Sir Henry Charles Loyd, KCB, KCVO, DSO, MC, DL.

==== Knight Commander of the Royal Victorian Order (KCVO) ====
- Commander Richard Colville, CB, CVO, DSC, Royal Navy (Retired).
- Major Geoffrey Hugh Eastwood, CVO, CBE.
- Sir Edward Milner Holland, CBE, QC.
- The Right Honourable Malcolm Stewart, Baron McCorquodale of Newton.
- Captain Stuart Henry Paton, CBE, Royal Navy (Retired).

==== Commander of the Royal Victorian Order (CVO) ====
- Bernard Parkes, MVO, OBE.
- Commander Philip John Row, MVO, OBE, Royal Navy (Retired).

==== Member of the Royal Victorian Order, 4th class (MVO) ====
- Squadron Leader Maurice Graham Baker, Royal Air Force.
- Squadron Leader Desmond Martin Divers, Royal Air Force.
- Chief Superintendent Henry Arthur Griffin, Metropolitan Police.
- Richard Hugh Buller Hamersley.
- Thomas John Hunt, OBE.
- Michael Vincent Levey.
- John Pillar, MVO.
- Commander Cameron Rusby, Royal Navy.
- Quentin Aubrey Thomas, TD, JP.

==== Member of the Royal Victorian Order, 5th class (MVO) ====
- Victoria Lee-Barber.
- Ralph Dawson.
- Sheila Munro.
- Warrant Officer Class I Olive Annie Rutter, MBE, Women's Royal Army Corps.
- Edward Smith.
- William Walsh.

=== Order of the British Empire ===
==== Knight Grand Cross of the Order of the British Empire (GBE) ====
Civil Division

- Sir James Miller, JP, DL, Lord Mayor, City of London.
- Lieutenant-General Sir William Pasfield Oliver, KCB, KCMG, OBE, British High Commissioner, Canberra.

==== Knight Commander of the Order of the British Empire (KBE) ====
Military Division

Royal Navy

- Vice Admiral Isaac William Trant Beloe, CB, DSC.

Royal Air Force

- Acting Air Marshal Charles Broughton, CB, CBE.
- Acting Air Marshal Paul Davie Holder, CB, DSO, DFC.

Civil Division

- Walter Cawood, CB, CBE, Chief Scientist, Ministry of Aviation.
- Stanley Paul Chambers, CB, CIE, Chairman, Imperial Chemical Industries, Ltd.
- Herbert Tetley, CB, Government Actuary.
- Geoffrey William Aldington, CMG, OBE, Her Majesty's Ambassador Extraordinary and Plenipotentiary in Luxembourg.
- Claude Harry Fenner, CMG, MBE, Inspector-General, Royal Malaysia Police.
- Robert Grainger Ker Thompson, CMG, DSO, MC, lately Head of British Advisory Mission, Viet Nam.

State of Victoria

- The Honourable Sir Thomas Chester Manifold. For services to racing and the community in the State of Victoria.

State of Queensland

- Alan Whiteside Munro, lately Minister for Industrial Development, State of Queensland.

==== Dame Commander of the Order of the British Empire (DBE) ====
Military Division

- Brigadier Joan Evelyn Henderson, Hon. ADC (221953), Women's Royal Army Corps.
- Brigadier Evelyn Marguerite Turner, MBE, RRC, QHNS, Hon. ADC (206486), Queen Alexandra's Royal Army Nursing Corps.

Civil Division

- Florence Evelyn Cayford, JP. For political and public services.
- Alderman Mabel Crout, JP. For political and public services in South-East London.
- Sibyl Mary Hathaway, OBE, Dame of Sark.
- Barbara Hepworth, CBE, Sculptor.
- Alderman Catherine Campbell Scott, JP. For political and public services in Newcastle-upon-Tyne.

==== Commander of the Order of the British Empire (CBE) ====
Military Division

Royal Navy

- Colonel John Cuthbert d'Ewes Coke, DSC, Royal Marines.
- Captain Kenneth Alfred Goudge, OBE, DSC (Retired).
- Surgeon Captain (D) Kenneth Alfred Johnson, LDS (Retired).
- Commodore Herbert Jack Lee, DSC.
- Commodore Eric Payne, Royal Fleet Auxiliary Service.
- The Right Reverend Monsignor George Edward Chatham Pitt.
- Captain Henry Stuart Spittle.

Army

- Brigadier (temporary) Patrick Francis Cholmley Bloxam, OBE (31876), Royal Army Pay Corps.
- Brigadier (honorary) Harold Ian Bransom, DSO, TD (63052), Army Cadet Force.
- Brigadier James Gouinlock Carr (53600), late Corps of Royal Engineers (now R.A.R.O.).
- Brigadier John Conway Commings, OBE (58146), late Infantry.
- Colonel Geoffrey Seymour Hamilton Dicker, MBE, TD, ADC, DL (194982), Staff, Territorial Army.
- Brigadier Michael Victor Fletcher (47430), late Infantry.
- Brigadier Donald Spencer Humphrys, OBE (71516), Corps of Royal Electrical & Mechanical Engineers.
- Brigadier Herbert Alfred Temple Jarrett-Kerr, OBE, ADC (52639), late Corps of Royal Engineers.
- Brigadier Rex Hamilton Edward Robinson, OBE, ERD (56973), late Royal Corps of Signals.
- Colonel David Bruce Ronald (58016), late Royal Regiment of Artillery.
- Colonel John Disney Sale, OBE (73165), late Infantry.
- Brigadier (temporary) Harry Thomas Shean, TD (62485), late Royal Army Educational Corps.
- Brigadier Dennis Augustus Turner (67905), late Royal Army Service Corps.
- Major-General Rodney Ray Jensen Putterill, OBE. General Officer Commanding, Rhodesia Army.

Royal Air Force

- Acting Air Vice Marshal Thomas Neville Stack, CVO, AFC.
- Air Commodore Lionel Herbert Greenman.
- Air Commodore Geoffrey Lawrence O'Hanlon, MBE.
- Group Captain Henry Desmond Bisley, OBE, AFC.
- Group Captain Hubert Gordon Davies.
- Group Captain Marcus Maxwell Gardham.
- Group Captain William Harbison, AFC.
- Group Captain Gordon Leonard Mattey, DFC, AFC.
- Group Captain Peter Norton Smith, DFC, AFC.
- Group Captain Frederick Beresford Sowrey, AFC.
- Group Captain Charles Leopold Walker Stewart, DSO, AFC.
- Group Officer Janet Arderne Bannatyne, Women's Royal Air Force (Retired).

Civil Division

- John Atkinson, lately Town Clerk, Newcastle-upon-Tyne, Northumberland.
- John Strachan Baillie, Chairman, Harland & Wolff Ltd., Belfast.
- Frank Donald Bickerton, Chief Information Officer, Ministry of Transport.
- Brebis Bleaney, Dr. Lee's Professor of Experimental Philosophy and Head of the Clarendon Laboratory, University of Oxford.
- George Brearley, Director, Association of British Chemical Manufacturers.
- Molly Root Brearley, Principal, Froebel Educational Institute.
- Archibald Bridges, lately Member, Industrial Injuries Advisory Council.
- Anthony Arthur Duncan Montague Browne, OBE, DFC. For services as Private Secretary to the late Right Honourable Sir Winston Spencer Churchill, KG, OM, CH.
- John Reginald Bunting, lately Assistant Controller of the Education Division, British Council.
- Alderman William Alexander Carnie. For political and public services in Wandsworth.
- Alderman Frederick Charles Chambers, JP. For political and public services in Kettering.
- Ambrose Congreve, Chairman, Humphreys & Glasgow Ltd. For services to export.
- Andrew Ramsden Cooper, Member of the Central Electricity Generating Board.
- Malcolm McGregor Cooper, Dean of Agriculture and Professor of Agriculture and Rural Economy, University of Newcastle-upon-Tyne.
- Ord Adams Cunningham, MBE, TD, DL, lately Chairman, Carnegie United Kingdom Trust, Dunfermline, Fife.
- Frank Herbert Davey, OBE, Accountant General, Commonwealth Relations Office.
- Brian Davidson, Member, Monopolies Commission.
- Martin Davies, Keeper, National Gallery.
- Professor Karl George Emeléus. For services to the Ministry of Home Affairs, Northern Ireland.
- William Ian Robertson Finlay, Director, Royal Scottish Museum.
- Charles Eddie Gallagher, OBE, MRCS, LRCP, Senior Principal Medical Officer, Ministry of Health.
- Jack Sydney Bates Gentry, CIE, OBE, ERD, General Manager, Tees Conservancy Commission.
- Arthur Herbert Grainger, Vice-Chairman, London Transport Board.
- Alexander Marshall Grant, Principal Dancer, Royal Ballet Company.
- Alderman Frederick George Gumbrill. For political and public services in Leicester.
- Alderman Florence Ellen Hammond. For political and public services in Birmingham.
- Heather Harper (Heather Mary Buck), Soprano.
- Geoffrey Wingfield Harris, DM, Dr. Lees Professor of Anatomy, University of Oxford; Director, Neuroendocrinology Research Unit, Medical Research Council.
- Arthur Guiton Harrison, Managing Editor, Jersey Evening Post. For public services in Jersey.
- Wilfred George Harrold. For services in the Defence field.
- Alderman William John Hartland, JP, Lord Mayor of Cardiff.
- Clement Algernon Charles Henniker-Heaton, Director, British Spinners & Doublers Association.
- William Alfred Hobbs, Assistant Chief Valuer, Board of Inland Revenue.
- Patrick Basil Hypher, Assistant Secretary, Board of Trade.
- Evan David Jones, Librarian, National Library of Wales.
- William Stephen Jones, Managing Director, J. M. Jones & Sons, Ltd.
- Alfred Henry Kellett, Chairman, South-Western Division, National Coal Board.
- William Latey, MBE, QC, lately Special Divorce Commissioner, Supreme Court of Judicature.
- Marcus Lipton, OBE, JP, MP, Member of Parliament for the Brixton Division of Lambeth since 1945. For political and public services.
- Roy Frederick Lloyd, MVO, Accountant, HM Treasury.
- Douglas Pearson Lund, Secretary and Chief Accountant, Royal Opera House, Covent Garden Ltd.
- James Millar Macgowan, JP. For political and public services in Dunbartonshire.
- Edgar Arthur John Mahler, Deputy Chief Alkali Inspector, Ministry of Housing, and Local Government.
- George Alexander Mason, VRD, FRCS, Senior Thoracic Surgeon, Newcastle-upon-Tyne Regional Hospital Board.
- Victor Cornelius Medvei, MD, MRCP, Senior Medical Officer, HM Treasury. For services to the Foreign Office.
- Stephen Charles Merivale, Secretary, Board of Governors, United Bristol Hospitals.
- Cyril Thomas Gibson Risch Miller, Honorary Secretary, British Maritime Law Association.
- James William Spencer Mount, BEM, Farmer and Horticulturist, Kent.
- Charles Edward Newman, MD, FRCP, Dean, Postgraduate Medical School, London.
- William Charles Wallace Nixon, FRCOG, FRCS, Professor of Obstetrics & Gynaecology, University of London.
- Brian Cecil Vernon Oddie, Deputy Chief Scientific Officer, Ministry of Defence (Royal Air Force).
- Frederick Alan Paine, Chairman and Managing Director, W. F. Paine Ltd. For services to export.
- Herbert John Harvey Parker, MP, Member of Parliament for Romford, 1935–1945, and for Dagenham since 1945. Parliamentary Under-Secretary of State, Dominions Office, 1945–1946. For political and public services.
- Captain Arthur George Victor Patey, lately Commodore, Union-Castle Line.
- David Edward Herbert Peirson, Secretary, United Kingdom Atomic Energy Authority.
- James Westlake Platt, Chairman, Foundation for Management Education. Director, Shell Petroleum Company Ltd.
- Montague Illtyd Prichard, MC, Managing Director, F. Perkins, Ltd. For services to export.
- William David Pugh, Managing Director, English Steel Corporation Ltd.
- Ronald Kenneth Duncan Renton, Government Parliamentary Agent.
- John Alexander Fraser Roberts, MD, FRCP, lately Director, Clinical Genetics Research Unit, Medical Research Council.
- Walter George Roberts, JP. For political and public services in Luton.
- John MacDonald Ross, Assistant Secretary, Home Office.
- Leonard Augustus Sansbury, Deputy Director of Dockyards, Ministry of Defence (Royal Navy).
- George Henry Selman, JP. For political and public services in Swindon.
- Daniel Sim, JP, County Convener, Ayrshire.
- Harriet Slater, MP, Member of Parliament for Stoke-on-Trent North since 1953. A Lord Commissioner of HM Treasury since October 1964. For political and public services.
- John Jesse George Smith, Assistant Secretary, Export Credits Guarantee Department.
- John Michael Austin-Smith, MC, TD, Architect.
- Alderman Harry Spink. For political and public services in Leeds.
- Robert Stead, Controller, North Region, British Broadcasting Corporation.
- Ernest Brownson Stevenson, Chairman and Managing Director, Crosfields & Calthrop Ltd., Compound Feeding-stuffs Manufacturers.
- Sidney Stringer, Alderman, Coventry, Warwickshire.
- Desmond Christopher Shawe-Taylor, Music Critic, The Sunday Times.
- Eric Todd, MBE, Principal Executive Officer, Foreign Office.
- Arthur Townsend, MBE, BEM, Commander, Metropolitan Police.
- William John Tristram. For services to the National Health Service.
- Albert Jordan Tulip, Senior Chief Inspector, Ministry of Education for Northern Ireland.
- Alderman Arthur James Twigger. For political and public services in Hornchurch.
- John Keith Vaughan, Painter.
- John Hamilton Vetch, Assistant Paymaster General.
- Alexander Burns Wallace, MB, FRCS.Ed, Part-time Consultant in Plastic Surgery, South-Eastern Regional Hospital Board, Scotland.
- Roger Talbot Walters, Deputy Director-General of Research & Development, Ministry of Public Building & Works.
- John Arthur Fergus Watson, JP. For services to Youth.
- Roy James Werry, Headmaster, Tollington Park Comprehensive School.
- John Foster Wilson, OBE, Director, Royal Commonwealth Society for the Blind.
- Lieutenant-Colonel Thomas Hugh Winterborn, OBE, Attached Ministry of Defence.
- Frank Coram Wright, Director, Standard Telephones and Cables Ltd. For services to export.

- Harold Mario Mitchell Acton, British subject resident in Italy.
- The Most Reverend Leslie Wilfred Brown, Archbishop of Uganda.
- The Right Reverend Archibald Rollo Graham Campbell, lately Bishop of Colombo, Ceylon.
- George Lefroy Carson, Conservator of Forests, State of Sabah.
- William James Maelor Evans, MRCS, LRCP, lately Chief Medical Officer, Tanzania.
- William Matthew Fell, Director of Audit, State of Singapore.
- Lieutenant-Colonel Terence Kitcat, DSO, MC (Retd.), Liaison Officer with Defence Staff, Singapore.
- Richard Stanley Latham, Commissioner of Revenue, Ministry of Finance, Northern Nigeria.
- John Edward Madocks, MBE, Adviser, National Development & Planning Office, Zambia. For public services in Northern Rhodesia, particularly in regard to the planning of the Zambia Independence Celebrations.
- The Right Reverend John Ernest Llewelyn Mort, Bishop of Northern Nigeria.
- Desmond Stephen Palmer, OBE, lately Deputy Head of British Advisory Mission, Viet Nam.
- Norman Charles Perkins, OBE, Administrative Officer (Staff Grade), Eastern Nigeria.
- Peter Ratcliffe, OBE, Director of Broadcasting, Radio Malaysia, State of Sarawak.
- George Frank Norman Reddaway, MBE, Regional Information Officer for the Middle East.
- Sam Scrutton Richardson, OBE, Deputy Vice-Chancellor, Ahmadu Bello University, Zaria, Northern Nigeria.
- George John Romolo Tod, British subject lately resident in Iraq.
- Eric Walter Frederick Tomlin, OBE, British Council Representative, Japan.
- Edward Parr Wiltshire, Her Majesty's Consul-General, Geneva.
- Hugh Burrowes. For public services in the Leeward and the Windward Islands.
- John Fernandes. For public services in British Guiana.
- Fung Ping-fan, OBE. For public services in Hong Kong.
- Ambrose Tucker Gosling, JP. For public services in Bermuda.
- John Maynard Hedstrom. For public services in Fiji.
- Sydney Harrington Nurse, MBE, Chairman, Police Service Commission, Barbados.
- Raymond Wilson Sawyer. For public services in the Bahamas.
- Kenneth John Tomlin, OBE, Director of Public Works, Barbados.
- Joseph Lyttleton Wills. For public services in British Guiana.

State of New South Wales

- Henry Thomas Eulert Holt, a Judge of the District Court, State of New South Wales.
- William Walter Pettingell, OBE. For public services, particularly as Chairman of the Industries Promotion Advisory Council, State of New South Wales.
- Norman Howard Routley. For public services, particularly as Chairman of the Decentralisation Advisory Council, State of New South Wales.

State of Victoria

- Alick Benson McKay, Chairman in London of the Victoria Promotion Committee.
- Albert Leonard Read, Chairman of the Judges of the County Court in the State of Victoria.

State of Queensland

- Aubrey David Dick Pye, MB, FRCS.Ed, of Brisbane, State of Queensland. For his services to the welfare of the sick.

State of South Australia

- Carl Clifford Jungfer, MD, BS. For services to the community in the State of South Australia.

State of Western Australia

- Norman Brearley, DSO, MC, AFC. For services to civil aviation in the State of Western Australia.

Rhodesia

- Avon Montgomery Bruce-Brand, JP, Secretary for Law and Order, Rhodesia.

==== Officer of the Order of the British Empire (OBE) ====
Military Division

Royal Navy

- Commander Larratt Cassels Darling.
- Commander Robin Beadon Lisle Foster.
- Commander Henry Carty Gowan (Retired).
- Surgeon Commander (D) Frederick Leonard Hall, HDD, LDS.
- Commander Peter Gerald Hammersley.
- Commander Peter James Hill Hoare.
- Commander Mervyn Bennicke Lanyon.
- Commander Peter Lavender.
- Commander Stanley Leonard, MBE.
- Major (Local Lieutenant Colonel) Robert Beverley Loudoun, Royal Marines.
- Acting Commander John Stanley Mitcalfe, VRD, Royal Naval Reserve.
- Commander Charles Alexander Jacomb Nicoll.
- Surgeon Commander Francis Joseph O'Kelly, MB, BCh.
- Commander Robert Harold Outram.
- The Reverend Basil Alderson Watson.
- Commander Denys Sidney Wyatt.

Army

- Lieutenant-Colonel John Gordon Bagnall, MC (118398), Royal Regiment of Artillery.
- Lieutenant-Colonel Eric James Barbell (268278), Royal Corps of Signals.
- Colonel (acting) Bernard Herbert Britton, TD (63998), Army Cadet Force (now retired).
- Lieutenant-Colonel Edward John Sidney Burnett, DSO, MBE, MC (325908), 10th Princess Mary's Own Gurkha Rifles.
- Lieutenant-Colonel (now Colonel) William Frank Cooper, MC (125181), late Corps of Royal Engineers.
- Lieutenant-Colonel George Dickson Dunlop, MBE, MC (71094), The Royal Scots (The Royal Regiment) (Employed List 1).
- Lieutenant-Colonel John Cecil Forman, TD (71941), Corps of Royal Engineers (now R.A.R.O.).
- Lieutenant-Colonel (temporary) The Right Honourable Paul Richard, Baron Freyberg, MC (231225), Grenadier Guards.
- Lieutenant-Colonel Charles Ernest Goddard (291866), Royal Army Pay Corps.
- Lieutenant-Colonel (Staff Quartermaster) Alexander George Hobbs (236678), Royal Army Service Corps (Employed List 2).
- Lieutenant-Colonel Aveling Barry Martin Kavanagh, MC (95620), The Duke of Wellington's Regiment (West Riding) (now R.A.R.O.).
- Lieutenant-Colonel Sidney James Lewis (256931), Royal Army Ordnance Corps.
- Lieutenant-Colonel (temporary) Gordon Robin Kingston Lyon (320174), 3rd Carabiniers (Prince of Wales's Dragoon Guards), Royal Armoured Corps.
- Lieutenant-Colonel Ewen William Macdonald (358333), The Queen's Own Buffs, The Royal Kent Regiment.
- Lieutenant-Colonel (now Colonel) Charles Edward Michie, TD (129992), Staff, Territorial Army.
- Major George Albert William Neill, TD, MD, DPH (S8433), Royal Army Medical Corps, Territorial Army.
- Lieutenant-Colonel Charles Cecil Lennox Pusinelli (67780), Royal Regiment of Artillery.
- Lieutenant-Colonel John Pomeroy Randle, MC (358326), The Devonshire & Dorset Regiment.
- Lieutenant-Colonel Arthur William Reading, MC, TD (320488), Corps of Royal Electrical & Mechanical Engineers.
- Brevet and Temporary Lieutenant-Colonel Francis Hyde Scobie (296753), The Parachute Regiment, The Parachute Corps.
- Lieutenant-Colonel John Blackett Scott (176077), The Green Howards (Alexandra, Princess of Wales's Own Yorkshire Regiment).
- Brevet and Temporary Lieutenant-Colonel William Norman Roy Scotter, MC (325998), The King's Own Royal Border Regiment.
- Major and Brevet Colonel Keith Nigel Loudoun-Shand, TD (372581), Queen's Royal Rifles, Territorial Army (now T.A.R.O.).
- Lieutenant-Colonel Harold Smith (224313), Royal Army Service Corps, Territorial Army.
- Lieutenant-Colonel David Spencer Squirrell (226362), Royal Tank Regiment, Royal Armoured Corps (Employed List 1).
- Lieutenant-Colonel Clive Edward Tonry (307983), Royal Corps of Signals.
- Lieutenant-Colonel (honorary) William Wilson (100774), Combined Cadet Force (now retired).
- Lieutenant-Colonel Walter Edward Woodley (338830), Corps of Royal Electrical & Mechanical Engineers.
- Lieutenant-Colonel and Brevet Colonel John Bruce Young, TD (222684), The Royal Hampshire Regiment, Territorial Army (now T.A.R.O.).
- Lieutenant-Colonel William Arthur Godwin, Rhodesia Army.
- Lieutenant-Colonel Edward Gopsill, DSO, MC (375798), 7th Duke of Edinburgh's Own Gurkha Rifles (Employed List 1); on loan to the Government of Malaysia.
- Lieutenant-Colonel Claude Worville Greathead, Rhodesia Army.
- Lieutenant-Colonel George Serevaki Mate, MC, MM, Commanding Officer, 2nd Battalion, Fiji Infantry Regiment.

Royal Air Force

- Group Captain Graham Abbott Smith, ED, Royal Rhodesian Air Force Volunteer Reserve.
- Wing Commander Francis Henry Percival Austin (45043) (Retired).
- Wing Commander John Lindley Causton, DFC (127905).
- Wing Commander Joseph Crane (49371).
- Wing Commander Douglas Frederick Harvey Grocott, AFC (153754).
- Wing Commander William Edward Hedley (162245).
- Wing Commander Mark Frederick Hobden (118331), Royal Air Force Regiment.
- Wing Commander Hugh Lionel Calder-Jones (153766).
- Wing Commander Geoffrey Moss, AFC (181112).
- Wing Commander George Hall Pennington (500887).
- Wing Commander Roy Henry Petchey (132769).
- Wing Commander James George Redman (50989).
- Wing Commander Clifford George Reeve, MBE (82965).
- Wing Commander Maxwell Scannell, DFC, AFC (59609).
- Wing Commander William Marton Smedley, (49481).
- Wing Commander Terence Nightingale Staples, DFM (100604).
- Wing Commander Ronald Storey (46194).
- Wing Commander Reginald Tillyard (48039).
- Wing Commander (Acting Group Captain) Philip Griffin Tyler (31471).
- Wing Commander Ronald Wood, DFC, AFC (121525).

Civil Division

- William Douglas Akester, Sales Director, Ransomes, Sims & Jefferies Ltd. For services to export.
- Alderman William Ody Allen, JP. For political and public services in Harrow.
- Colonel Robert Anthony Armstrong, lately Chairman, Dumfries and Galloway Development Association.
- Leslie Alan Ashton, Chief Experimental Officer, Fire Research Station, Ministry of Technology.
- Lady Helen Frances Asquith, HM Inspector of Schools, Department of Education & Science.
- James Comber Nash Baillie, Chief Commercial Engineer, North of Scotland Hydro-Electric Board.
- John Theodore Baldwin, Chairman, Scottish Medical Practices Committee.
- Nancy Balfour, Writer in Economist.
- Harry Barber, Chairman, North Staffordshire (Mental) Hospital Management Committee.
- Joseph Barrow. For political and public services in Middlesex.
- Frederick James Redvers Bartlett, Senior Assistant Director of Examinations, Civil Service Commission.
- Percival James Barton, JP. For political and public services in Fulham.
- Maurice Beck, Managing Director, Beck & Company (Fashions) Ltd. For services to export.
- Alderman Evan Bevan, lately Chairman, Carmarthenshire County Council.
- Colonel Eugene St. John Birnie, lately General Secretary, Church of England Children's Society.
- Thomas Bodle. For political and public services in Swanscombe.
- Frank Stuart Borley, Superintending Estate Surveyor, Ministry of Public Building & Works.
- Thornton Howard Bridgewater, Chief Engineer, Television, British Broadcasting Corporation.
- Harry Archibald Brown, Chairman and Managing Director, W. & E. Moore, Ltd.
- William Donald Tristram Brunyate, DM, BCh, Senior Medical Officer, Ministry of Pensions & National Insurance.
- Francis Richard Barnard Bucknall, ERD, Deputy Director of the Post Office, Wales and Border Counties.
- Sidney James Burton, Manager, Overseas Operations, Chaseside Engineering Company Ltd. For services to export.
- Ronald Bernard Button, Higher Collector, Board of Customs & Excise.
- Reginald Charles Muskett Callaghan, Chairman, Letchworth Local Employment Committee.
- Captain John Archibald Cameron, General Manager, British European Airways Helicopters Ltd.
- Violet Helen Carson, Actress.
- George Thomas Chamberlain, Manager, Old Vic.
- Reginald Hughes Childs, Chairman, City of Westminster Savings Committee.
- George Thomas Clarke, Higher Waterguard Superintendent, Board of Customs & Excise.
- Leonard Arthur Clarke, Superintendent Registrar for the Surrey Mid-Eastern Registration District.
- Wilfred Clover, Councillor, Oldham County Borough.
- Alderman John Herbert Cocks. For political and public services in Kingston upon Thames.
- Cuthbert Evan Duncan Colquhoun, President, Scottish Milk Trade Federation.
- John Hawley Cooke, JP, Chairman, Staffordshire Agricultural Executive Committee.
- Arthur James Cope, Chief Constructor, Ministry of Defence (Royal Navy).
- Ernest Herbert Douglas Craig, Artistic Director, Opera for All.
- Charles William Davies, Telephone Manager, London Telecommunications Region Centre Area, General Post Office.
- The Reverend David Tegfan Davies. For public services in South Wales.
- Wing Commander James Leonard Dell, Chief Test Pilot, British Aircraft Corporation (Operating) Ltd. (Preston Division).
- Colin Sturtevant Dence, Managing Director, Brand & Company Ltd.
- Captain George Edge, MBE, Master, MV Flintshire, Glen Line Ltd.
- Donald Thomas Edwards, Deputy Chief Architect, Office of the Receiver for the Metropolitan Police District.
- Ernest Edwards, JP, Chairman, Cardiff & District Advisory Committee.
- Alderman Thomas Hill Ellingham, JP. For political and public services in Cambridgeshire.
- Norman Douglas Ellis, JP, Chairman, Leicestershire Branch, Soldiers, Sailors & Airmen's Families Association.
- Ernest Thomas Floyd Ewin, MVO, Registrar and Receiver, St. Paul's Cathedral.
- Cyril Rawlett Fenton. For political and public services in Rickmansworth.
- William Alexander Ferguson, Secretary, British Museum (Natural History).
- James Finnigan, JP, Chairman, Devon District Advisory Committee, South Western Regional Board for Industry.
- Major John Francis Fox, MC, TD. For public services in Lancashire.
- Ronald Lloyd Fox, Personnel Officer, Independent Television Authority.
- Alfred John Nelson Fuller, Headmaster, Oldborough Manor Secondary School, Maidstone.
- Arthur Gee, Chairman, North Level Commission. For services to land drainage.
- Margaret Hunter Gibb. For political and public services in the North of England.
- Norah Louise Gibbs, Chief Psychologist, London Child Guidance Training Centre.
- Mary Lyle Gilchrist, MD, ChB, lately School Medical Officer and Deputy Medical Officer of Health, Leyton.
- Isidore Godfrey, Musical Director and Conductor, D'Oyly Carte Opera Company.
- Ernest William Goodwin, MB, ChB, General Medical Practitioner in Leicester.
- Alderman Harold Gray, JP. For political and public services in Warrington.
- Trevor Greenshields, Chairman, Durham County Agricultural Executive Committee.
- Denis de Montmorrencie Guilfoyle, Chief Regional Officer, North Midland Region, Central Office of Information.
- David James Hadley, Deputy Division Manager, Chemical Research Division, The Distillers Company, Ltd.
- Geoffrey Colton Haines, lately General Secretary, London Association for the Blind.
- Frank Maurice Hale, Senior Engineer (Electrical), Ministry for Transport|Ministry of Transport.
- Lieutenant-Colonel Charles Stuart Hampton, TD, DL, Secretary, Territorial and Auxiliary Forces Associations of the Counties of Angus and the City of Dundee, Fife and Perth.
- Francis William Lister Heathcote, Technical Manager, Brockhouse Steel Structures Ltd.
- Alderman James Donaldson Henry, Mayor of Ballymena, Co. Antrim.
- Frank Hill, Regional Controller, North-Western Region, National Assistance Board.
- Catherine Hollingworth, Superintendent of Speech Therapy and Speech Training, Aberdeen.
- Dorothy Wood Homer, lately Secretary of the Women's Group on Public Welfare.
- George Thomas Hudman, Assistant Manager, Overseas Service, Navy, Army and Air Force Institutes.
- Wing Commander Frederick William Hudson, lately Special Appointment, Ministry of Defence (Royal Air Force).
- Thomas Garfield Hughes, Superintendent (Chemical Plants), Windscale and Calder Works, United Kingdom Atomic Energy Authority.
- Captain James Henry Innes, Licensed Pilot, Clyde Pilotage Authority.
- Osmonde Grimes John. For political and public services in Pembrokeshire.
- Douglas Norman Johnson, Chairman and Managing Director, Forgecraft Ltd., Welwyn Garden City.
- John Francis Jones, MBE, National Savings Member for the South East District of the West Riding of Yorkshire.
- John Phillips Jones, Regional Land Commissioner, Wales, Ministry of Agriculture, Fisheries & Food.
- Robert Jones, JP, County Alderman, Chairman of Highways Committee, Nottinghamshire.
- Walter Richards Joslin, Grade I, Deputy Regional Controller, Ministry of Labour.
- William Kerr, Chief Constable, Dunbartonshire Constabulary.
- Sydney Percy King, Vice-Chairman, North Midland Regional Board for Industry. Chairman, Kesteven Water Board.
- Charles William Goodwin Trinder Kirk, Town Clerk, Hemel Hempstead Borough Council, Hertfordshire.
- Philip Harold Knighton, MBE, Architect, Newcastle Regional Hospital Board.
- William Guldmar Kuhnel, Chief Executive Officer, Ministry of Pensions & National Insurance.
- Geoffrey Roy Landale, MBE, County Inspector, Royal Ulster Constabulary.
- John Lane, HM Senior District Inspector of Mines & Quarries, Ministry of Power.
- Robert Bertram Laurie, Secretary, Law Society of Scotland.
- Elsie Blanche Lawson, Chairman, The Helix (Universal) Company Ltd. For services to export.
- William Leach, Chairman, Yorkshire Electricity Consultative Council.
- Marshall Forbes Leslie, MB, JP, General Practitioner in Londonderry.
- The Right Honourable Winifred Agnes, Viscountess Leverhulme, County Organiser, Cheshire, Women's Voluntary Service.
- Donald Hamish Little, Superintending Civil Engineer, Ministry of Public Building & Works.
- Janet Thomson Locke, Matron, Victoria Infirmary, Glasgow.
- Alan Leslie McClure, Deputy Chief Engineer, Crown Agents for Oversea Governments & Administrations.
- Richard Maurice Sotheron McConaghey, MD, General Medical Practitioner in Devon.
- William MacLean, JP. For political and public services in Northumberland.
- Terence Cameron Macnamara, Technical Counsellor, Associated Television, Ltd.
- Margaret Macnaughton, Chief Nursing Officer, Scottish Home & Health Department.
- Joseph McNeill, JP. For services to the potato industry in Northern Ireland.
- Iris Irene Macvie, Deputy President, County of London Branch, British Red Cross Society.
- Gregory Ernest Marriott, Chief Executive Officer, Ministry of Land & Natural Resources.
- Arthur Leslie George Mathams, Director, Camper & Nicholsons Ltd., Southampton.
- Arthur James Mee, HM Inspector of Schools, Scottish Education Department.
- William Henry Mercer, MBE, Chief Constable, Air Force Department Constabulary, Ministry of Defence (Royal Air Force).
- Josef Eduard Mladek, Director and Chairman, Crepe Weavers Ltd., Newtownards, Co. Down.
- William Huyzer Mol, Headmaster, Ballymena Academy.
- Frank Moore, Principal, Ministry of Defence (Army).
- Glyndwr Morris, Director, Engineering Employers Association of South Wales.
- John Vincent Morris, MD, Physician Superintendent, Little Plumstead Hospital, Norwich.
- Sydney Harry Carael Mound, MBE, Chief Work Study Officer, Army Work Study Group, Guildford, Ministry of Defence (Army).
- John Archibald Naisbitt. For services to Agriculture.
- Percy George Negus, Senior Architect, Ministry of Housing & Local Government.
- John Reginald Neville, Director, Nottingham Playhouse.
- Charles Stanislaus O'Flynn, MB, BCh, General Medical Practitioner in Sheffield.
- Eric Wilfred Parker, Administrative & Establishment Officer, London Fire Brigade.
- Ernest James Parker, Assistant Accountant and Comptroller General, Board of Inland Revenue.
- Frank William Parrott, JP. For political and public services in Westmorland.
- Hugh Paul, Chairman, Ipswich Savings Committee.
- Eric Omar Pearson, Director, Commonwealth Institute of Entomology.
- Captain Philip Henry Pedrick, Commodore Master, MV Port New Plymouth, Port Line Ltd.
- David Perkins, Vice-Principal and Head of Mining and Engineering Department, Ammanford Technical College.
- William Pitson, lately Quality Manager, Bristol Siddeley Engines Ltd.
- Cyril Thomas Howe Plant, Chairman, Civil Service Sanatorium Society.
- Matthew Pollock, Oil Fuel Technical Adviser, Ministry of Defence (Royal Navy).
- John Charles Potts, Grade 2 Officer, Ministry of Labour.
- Ronald Rees Powell, MBE, MRCS, LRCP, Chairman, Reigate Sea Cadet Corps Unit Committee. Southern Area Representative Chairman on the Sea Cadet Council.
- Charles Ernest Proctor. For services to the fishing industry. Managing Director, Tom Sleight Ltd.
- Clifford Prothero. For political and public services in Wales.
- James Alfred Quinney, Principal Inspector of Taxes, Board of Inland Revenue.
- Leslie John Alfred Randall, lately Industrial Editor, Daily Mail.
- Alderman Eva Ratcliffe, JP. For political and public services in Yorkshire.
- Andrew Vincent Rawson. Chairman, No. 103 (Doncaster) Squadron Committee, Air Training Corps.
- Reginald Gordon Read, Senior Quantity Surveyor, Home Office.
- Edward Valentine Rees. For political and public services in South West England.
- Major Wilfrid Norman Reeve, MBE, MC, lately Chairman, Westminster, Kensington and Chelsea War Pensions Committee.
- Alan Reiach, Architect.
- Dorothy Hogg Riddell, JP. For political and public services in County Durham.
- William Thomas Carmichael Riddell, TD, Managing Director, John Hastie & Company Ltd., Greenock. For services to export.
- Alan Robertson, Senior Principal Scientific Officer, Agricultural Research Councils Unit of Animal Genetics, Edinburgh.
- Eric Desmond Robertson, Assistant Controller, Overseas Services, British Broadcasting Corporation.
- Margaret Robertson. For social services in Lancashire and Cheshire.
- Charles Henry Robinet, Chief Executive Officer, Ministry of Health.
- Douglas MacIver Robinson, Deputy Principal Sea Transport Surveyor, Board of Trade.
- Evelyn Robinson, formerly Chief Nursing Officer, London County Council.
- Alderman Archibald Rowe, JP. For political and public services in Workington.
- Derek Samuel Salberg, JP, Managing Director, Alexandra Theatre (Birmingham) Ltd.
- Donald Scott, Engineer-in-Chief, Cable & Wireless Ltd.
- Edith Lesley Sewell, General Secretary, National Association of Youth Clubs.
- Ian James Shaw, Senior Principal Scientific Officer, Ministry of Defence.
- Percy Shaw, Chairman and Managing Director, Reflecting Road Studs Ltd.
- Joan Margaret Sheppard, Foreign Office.
- Cecil Owen Shipp, Attached Ministry of Defence.
- Charles Simison, Deputy Chief Investigation Officer, Board of Customs & Excise.
- Francis Herbert Smeed, Chief Constable, Newport Borough Police, Monmouthshire.
- Clara Marjorie Smith, lately Headmistress, Cockshut Hill Girls, Secondary School, Birmingham.
- Frank Smith, MBE, National Savings District Member for North Northamptonshire.
- William Frederick Austin Snook, Engineer and Manager, Sewage Purification Department, Havering.
- Alfred Matthew Southwick, Alderman, South Shields County Borough Council.
- Frances Clare Spurgin, JP, Chairman of the Blockley Petty Sessional Division of Gloucestershire.
- Ernest Menzies Stewart, Chairman, Pensions, Disablement and Employment Committee, British Legion.
- Graham Guthrie Sutherland, Honorary Treasurer, The Royal Society for the Prevention of Accidents.
- Ernest William Swanton, Cricket Correspondent, The Daily Telegraph.
- William Stuart Theaker, JP, Chairman, Board of Visitors, HM Borstal Institution, Hatfield, Yorkshire.
- Averil Fuller Thompson, Assistant Keeper 1st Class, India Office Library, Commonwealth Relations Office.
- Kenneth Wilson Thorndyke, MBE, lately Civil Defence Officer, Boots Pure Drug Company Ltd., Nottingham.
- Leslie Ronald George Treloar. For services to Polymer and Fibre Science.
- Herbert Harold Tucker, Director Head of Editorial Section, Foreign Office.
- Barry Emmanuel Tuckwell, Principal Horn Player, London Symphony Orchestra.
- Walter Spenceley Turnbull, lately President of the (Football) Referees' Association.
- Frankie Vaughan, (Frank Ableson). For services to the welfare of youth.
- Charles Joseph Venables, Timber Merchant. For services to Forestry.
- Lewis Edgar Waddilove, Director, Joseph Rowntree Memorial Trust.
- Cecil Dennis Waldron, Commandant, Prestwick Airport, Ministry of Aviation.
- Jack Warner (Jack Waters), Film and Variety Artist.
- Roger Washbourn, Controller, Home Division II, British Council.
- Frank Douglas Weeks, MM, lately General Secretary, Manchester and Salford Council of Social Service.
- Bernard George Felix Weitz, MRCVS, Head of Department, Lister Institute of Preventive Medicine.
- Commander Duncan Frederick White, RD, Chief inspector, HM Coastguard, Board of Trade.
- Geoffrey Wiglesworth, Chief Accountant Ministry of Agriculture, Fisheries & Food.
- Geoffrey Maxwell Penda Williams, First Class Valuer, Board of Inland Revenue.
- Sidney Mon Williams, Chief, Accountant, Board of Trade.
- Major Thomas John Williams, TD, Director and Group General Manager, Steel Production, South Durham Steel and Iron Company Ltd.
- Olive Mary Wilson. For political and public services in Kensington.
- Lieutenant-Colonel James Albert Woodgate, Director, United Kingdom Region, Commonwealth War Graves Commission.
- Sidney Charles Wybrow, Assistant Director Engineer, Director-General of Inspections Headquarters, Ministry of Aviation.
- Robert Yates, Engineer Superintendent, William Robertson Shipowners Ltd.
- Wilfred Thomas Young. For political services.

- Frank Sudbury Batty, British subject lately resident in the Sudan.
- Ernest Henry Wetton Biggs, lately Chief Mechanical Engineer, Western Nigeria.
- Reginald Boyd, City Engineer, Lagos, Federal Republic of Nigeria.
- Brian Ingle Brough, Chief Water Engineer, Group 5, Northern Nigeria.
- Lawrence Hamilton Browne, MC, DCM, British subject resident in Libya.
- Stanley George Browne, MD, FRCS, Senior Specialist (Leprologist), Eastern Nigeria.
- George Buchanan, LRCP, FRCS. Ed, Senior Specialist (Surgeon), Western Nigeria.
- Ronald Newcomb James Burgess, MBE, British subject resident in Denmark.
- The Reverend Canon Douglas Harry Burton, Vicar of St. Saviours Church, Belgrano, Buenos Aires.
- Norman Stanley Butterfield, lately Controller, Finance and Accounts, Posts & Telegraphs Division, Federal Ministry of Communications, Nigeria.
- Richard Maynard Dudley Buxton, MBE, Assistant Commissioner of Police, Malaysia.
- Stafford Frederick Campbell, Chargé d'Affaires, Her Majesty's Embassy, Santo Domingo.
- John William Valentine Chamberlain, Deputy Chief Inspector of Education, Northern Nigeria.
- Mark Alastair Coats, British subject resident in Spain.
- Walter Harold Cooke, MBE, Superintending Engineer, Ministry of Works & Transport, Western Nigeria.
- Arthur William Evelyn Day. For services to the British community in Nigeria.
- The Reverend Henry Frederick Drake, Field Secretary and Head of Baptist Mission Stations in the Congo.
- Walter Fairbank, Commissioner of Town and Country Planning, Malaysia.
- Jack Fairhurst, MBE. For public services in Northern Rhodesia and Zambia, particularly as Director of the Zambia Independence Celebrations.
- Captain Reginald Ernest Gee, Director of Marine, Malaysia.
- Thomas Whitby Gee, Permanent Secretary, Ministry of Education, Uganda.
- Geoffrey Windham Gould, MC, Under-Secretary (Finance), Treasury, Malaysia.
- Richard Hallam Gower, lately Permanent Secretary, Ministry of Local Government, Tanzania.
- Harold Hayman. For services to the British community in South India.
- John William (Pat) Heffernan, Head of Reuters Bureau, Washington.
- Denys Chalmers Hill, lately Permanent Secretary, Ministry of Home Affairs, Tanzania.
- William Bradley Inches, Royal Navy (retired), lately Principal Marine Officer, Federal Inland Waterways Department, Nigeria.
- Arthur Bert Jefferies, MBE, Assistant Commissioner of Police, Malaysia.
- Edward Arthur Jenkins. For services to the British community in India.
- Peter Gordon Lloyd, British Council Representative, Ethiopia.
- Gordon Joseph Lockley, lately Chief Fisheries Officer, Tanzania.
- Murray Lunan, lately Commissioner of Agriculture, Tanzania.
- Kenneth Lupton, Under-Secretary (Finance), Ministry of Finance, Northern Nigeria.
- Douglas Sampson Mackenzie, British subject resident in Chile.
- Denis John Mahony, lately Deputy Secretary, Treasury, Tanzania.
- Lieutenant-Colonel John Arthur McKay, MBE, lately British Consul, Medan.
- Peter Standley McLean, lately Acting Permanent Secretary for Planning, Uganda.
- Khushru Mancherji Mehta, MB, FRCS.Ed, Surgeon, Medical Department, State of Sabah.
- Joseph Maria William Novella, MBE, British subject resident in Morocco.
- John Thomas Oldham, British subject lately resident in Indonesia.
- Stanley Walter Frank Palmer, DFC, Director of Civil Aviation, Malaysia.
- Herbert Walter Trevor Pepper, Adviser on Federal Taxation, Treasury, Malaysia.
- Sidney John Peskett, British subject resident in Belgium.
- Wentworth Victor Rose, Commissioner for Agriculture, Ministry of Agriculture & Cooperatives, Uganda.
- Denys William Rowley, First Secretary, Her Majesty's Embassy, Beirut.
- Robert Geoffrey Tunstall St. Leger, Administrative Officer, Class 1, Eastern Nigeria.
- Norman Goodes Standen, Her Majesty's Consul, Bergen.
- Basil John Jerome Stubbings, lately Provincial Commissioner, Vice-Presidents Office, Tanzania.
- Harry Ward Tatham. For services to the British community in Ceylon.
- Eric Thorpe. For services to British interests in Nigeria.
- Richard Henry Turner, lately Adviser to the Kuwait Currency Board.
- Leslie Victor Wailes, Accountant-General, Northern Nigeria.
- George Webster, Chief Conservator of Forests, Uganda.
- William Trevor Thomas Henry White. For services to the British community in Takoradi, Ghana.
- Albert Denis Willey, Surveyor-General, Northern Nigeria.
- William Wood, MBE, lately Permanent Secretary, Ministry of Commerce & Industry, Tanzania.
- Berchell Aubrey Barker, Planning Officer, Town & Country Planning Department, British Guiana.
- David John Barnes, Commissioner of Inland Revenue, Fiji.
- Brook Antony Bernacchi, QC. For public services in Hong Kong.
- Aubrey Gordon Booker, DSC, Director of Marine, Mauritius.
- Ronald Godfrey Cox, GM, Director of Fire Services, Hong Kong.
- Ralph Hinslewood Daly, Senior Adviser, Western Aden Protectorate.
- William Oliver Davies, Director of Public Works, Bechuanaland Protectorate.
- Leon Davenport Fox, JP. For public services in Bermuda.
- Cyril Maitland Fraser, Accountant General, British Guiana.
- Fung Hon-chu. For public services in Hong Kong.
- Sidney Samuel Gordon. For public services in Hong Kong.
- Kenneth Latimer Hardaker, Federal Deputy Director of Public Works, Aden.
- Charles Francis Henville, QC, Attorney General, British Honduras.
- Samuel George Inniss, Manager, Government Savings Bank, Barbados.
- Peter Joseph Isola. For public services in Gibraltar.
- John Gabriel Joaquin, JP. For public services in British Guiana.
- Cenydd Richards Jones, MBE, MB, BCh, Permanent Secretary and Director of Health Services, Federation of South Arabia.
- William Archibald Kelsick. For public services in St. Christopher-Nevis-Anguilla.
- Vivian O'Donnell King. For public services in Bermuda.
- Macfarlane Lepolesa. For public services in Basutoland.
- Desmond Oswald Newbert McIntyre, MB, FRCS, Surgeon Specialist, Princess Margaret Hospital, Dominica.
- Brian Lucien O'Leary, MBE, Assistant Attorney General, Basutoland.
- Samuel Alexander Schultz, JP. For public services in British Guiana.
- Victor Thomas Smithyman, Deputy Commissioner of Police, Swaziland.
- Ronald Audley Stoute, Commissioner of Police, Barbados.
- Patrick Richard Forsyth Thompson, Secretary for Local Administration & Social Development, Swaziland.
- Keith William Trenaman, Chief Forestry Officer, British Solomon Islands Protectorate.
- Harry George William Turner, Deputy Public Service Commissioner, Aden.
- John Brian Twomey, Commissioner of Lands & Surveys, British Solomon Islands Protectorate.
- Noel Edgar Venner, Secretary of Finance, St. Lucia.
- Woo Pak-foo, MB, ChB. For public services in Hong Kong.

State of New South Wales

- Councillor John Richard Black, President of the Ashford Shire Council, State of New South Wales.
- Edward Michael Boland, Apprenticeship Commissioner, State of New South Wales.
- Richard Maxwell Gibson, MB, BS, Director of Medicine, Royal Newcastle Hospital, State of New South Wales.
- Hedley Victor Horwood. For services to local government and the community in Parramatta, State of New South Wales.
- Keith Richardson Waddell, lately Chamber Magistrate, Newcastle, State of New South Wales.
- Colonel William Wood, MD, ChB, of Narrabeen, State of New South Wales. For services in the interests of ex-servicemen and women.

State of Victoria

- George Burridge Leith, of Toorak, State of Victoria. For services to the community, particularly to returned ex-servicemen.
- Beverley Edith Orr. For services to the Girl Guide Movement in the State of Victoria.
- Councillor Jack Pascoe, of Maryborough, State of Victoria. For services to local government and the community.

State of Queensland

- Walter Hubert Boyd, of Brisbane, State of Queensland. For services to the legal profession and the community.
- George Hender Cheston Garlick, Lieutenant-Colonel and Chaplain, Salvation Army. For community welfare services in the State of Queensland.
- Lilian Leitch, of Brisbane, State of Queensland. For devoted services to the nursing profession.
- John Robertson Spender, President of the Branch for the State of Queensland of the Royal Life Saving Society of Australia.

State of South Australia

- Roy Elliot Carter, of St. Georges, State of South Australia. For services to the Methodist Church and the care of the aged.
- Archibald John Manning. For services to the State Bank of South Australia, particularly as General Manager.
- Violet Beatrice Ramsay, Matron, The Queen Victoria Maternity Hospital, State of South Australia.
- The Reverend Canon William Robert Ray, Headmaster, Pulteney Grammar School, State of South Australia.

State of Western Australia

- David Bell, JP. For his contribution to progress and development in the State of Western Australia.

State of Tasmania

- Harry Vernard Biggins. For services in the field of education in the State of Tasmania.
- Frank Bathurst Edwards, of Ulverstone, State of Tasmania. For public and community services.
- Alexander Reginald Muir. For services to the community in the Burnie district, State of Tasmania.

Rhodesia

- Thomas Egerton Seymour Francis. For services to sport, particularly cricket and Rugby football, in Rhodesia.
- James Montgomery, MD, FRCS. Ed. For his services to medicine and the community in Umtali, Rhodesia.
- Alan George Hay Rattray, Officer-in-Charge, Agricultural Experimental Station, Salisbury, Rhodesia.

==== Member of the Order of the British Empire (MBE) ====
Military Division

Royal Navy

- Lieutenant Commander William Anthony John Bale.
- Engineer Lieutenant John James Duddin.
- Lieutenant Commander (SD) (G) Maurice Henry Elsworthy, DSM (Retired).
- Supply Lieutenant Commander Reginald James Griffin.
- Lieutenant Commander Claude Henry Griffiths.
- Lieutenant Commander Julian Michael Howard.
- Lieutenant Commander Clifford James Wynne Kindell.
- Lieutenant (CCF) Gilbert William Mantell, TD, Royal Naval Reserve.
- Lieutenant (SD) (G) Harry Purser.
- Lieutenant Commander Stanley Frederick Rogers.
- Wardmaster Lieutenant Commander John Stockton (Retired).
- Lieutenant Commander Herbert Richard Tucker.
- Lieutenant Commander (SD) (B) Cecil William Whittington.
- Lieutenant Michael John Moyse Wilkin.
- Captain (Acting Major) Ian Frank Wray, Royal Marines.

Army

- T/10690802 Warrant Officer Class I Kenneth Blake Allemandy, Royal Army Service Corps.
- Captain John Edward Hamilton Arnott (181115), Royal Corps of Signals, Territorial Army.
- Major Peter Ivor Attack (380013), Royal Army Service Corps.
- Major (Quartermaster) Joseph Richardson Bell (363156), Corps of Royal Engineers, Territorial Army.
- Major (Q.G.O.) Birbahadur Rawat (423378), Gurkha Signals.
- 2548511 Warrant Officer Class I Geoffrey Augustus Bourne, Corps of Royal Electrical & Mechanical Engineers.
- Major (temporary) John Boyne (422529), Corps of Royal Electrical & Mechanical Engineers.
- Major (Quartermaster) Charles Arthur Brown (378643), 1st Green Jackets, 43rd & 52nd (now retired).
- Major Harry Francis Lovell-Butt (337340), Royal Army Pay Corps.
- Major Peter Irvine Chiswell (414821), The Parachute Regiment, The Parachute Corps.
- 22276043 Warrant Officer Class II (Drum Major) Windsor Charles Baker Clark, The Queen's Own Buffs, The Royal Kent Regiment.
- Major Elizabeth Rosemary Denne (386452), Women's Royal Army Corps.
- Major (Quartermaster) Robert Draper (450580), Corps of Royal Engineers.
- The Reverend Evan Walter Evans, Chaplain to the Forces, 3rd Class (244136), Royal Army Chaplains Department.
- S/19043702 Warrant Officer Class II Albert Flear, Royal Army Service Corps.
- Major Jack Spencer Fletcher (397244), The Queen's Own Buffs, The Royal Kent Regiment.
- 2549474 Warrant Officer Class II Brian Cecil Folkard, Royal Corps of Signals.
- Major Dorothy Angela Clough Fowler, TD (192866), Women's Royal Army Corps (now retired).
- Major Julian Edmond Kingsford Goodbody (418272), The Devonshire and Dorset Regiment.
- Major Bryan George Grime, TD (430900), Queen's Own Highlanders (Seaforth & Camerons), Territorial Army.
- 21019336 Warrant Officer Class II William Hand, Corps of Royal Electrical & Mechanical Engineers, Territorial Army.
- Major (Quartermaster) George Arthur Hills (343361), Corps of Royal Engineers.
- Major Peter Hudson (330952), 3rd Green Jackets, The Rifle Brigade.
- Major Hugh Anthony Johnstone (420864), Royal Corps of Signals.
- Major (acting) Edward Jones (273871), Combined Cadet Force.
- Major Andrew Kerr (415809), Royal Corps of Signals.
- Major Christopher Alfred Kiernan (326868), Royal Army Ordnance Corps.
- 14724282 Warrant Officer Class I Noel Harold Frederick Kisbee, The Royal Highland Fusiliers (Princess Margaret's Own Glasgow & Ayrshire Regiment).
- Major (temporary) Barry Michael Lane (433169), The Somerset & Cornwall Light Infantry.
- Major Alastair Malcolm Langlands (384066), 2nd King Edward VII's Own Gurkha Rifles (The Sirmoor Rifles).
- Captain Sidney Hugh Lawrence (452472), Royal Army Ordnance Corps.
- Major (Queen's Gurkha Officer) Lokbahadur Thapa (401575), 6th Queen Elizabeth's Own Gurkha Rifles.
- Major Douglas Percy Lovejoy (403525), The Devonshire & Dorset Regiment.
- 1157759 Warrant Officer Class I Thomas Sylvester Ludford, Royal Regiment of Artillery.
- S/22056176 Warrant Officer Class II James John MacDougall, Royal Army Service Corps.
- 3772686 Warrant Officer Class II Bernard Murphy, Corps of Royal Engineers, Territorial Army.
- Major Lennox Alexander Hawkins Napier, MC (397999), The South Wales Borderers.
- Major Edward Anthony John Parry (393240), The Worcestershire Regiment.
- Major Derek Archer Phillips, ERD, TD (100040), Royal Corps of Signals, Army Emergency Reserve.
- Major Geoffrey Edward Phillips, TD (70810), Royal Regiment of Artillery.
- 2624603 Warrant Officer Class I Dennis Randell, Grenadier Guards.
- Major (temporary) John Gordon Richards (429597), Royal Army Educational Corps (now R.A.R.O.).
- Major (acting) Francis William Seymour Stanbrook, MC (249251), Army Cadet Force.
- Major Deryck Godfrey Walter Start (390652), Royal Army Service Corps.
- 860042 Warrant Officer Class I George Frederick Stirling, Royal Regiment of Artillery.
- 22346425 Warrant Officer Class II Frederick Maurice Clifford Stock, Royal Corps of Signals.
- 21015230 Warrant Officer Class II Eric Victor Surman, Army Catering Corps, Territorial Army.
- Major John Keith Lumley Thompson, TD (254875), Corps of Royal Electrical & Mechanical Engineers, Territorial Army.
- Major Frank Neville Tromans, ERD (333246), Royal Army Medical Corps, Army Emergency Reserve.
- Major (acting) Sidney William Turner (389333), Combined Cadet Force.
- Captain James Edward Twinn (454632), Corps 1 of Royal Engineers, Territorial Army.
- Major Richard Maurice Hilton Vickers, MVO (400100), Royal Tank Regiment, Royal Armoured Corps.
- Major (Quartermaster) Leonard Walker (439779), 17th/21st Lancers, Royal Armoured Corps.
- S/22976513 Warrant Officer Class II Eric Raymond White, Royal Army Service Corps.
- Major David Stuart Whiter (415017), Royal Regiment of Artillery.
- The Reverend William George Augustus Wright, Chaplain to the Forces, 3rd Class (260306), Royal Army Chaplains Department.
- Major William Thomas Duckworth de Haast, Rhodesia Army.
- Captain Hugh Richard Louis Whistler (457306), Corps of Royal Engineers; on loan to the Government of Malaysia.
- Major Richard Eustace John Gerrard-Wright (407841), 2nd (Duchess of Gloucester's Own Lincolnshire & Northamptonshire) Battalion, The Royal Anglian Regiment; formerly on loan to the Government of Kenya.
- Lieutenant Ivan August Uddenberg, St. Kitts-Nevis Voluntary Defence Force.

Royal Air Force

- Squadron Leader Vernon Buckman (49851).
- Squadron Leader Philip Morton Butler (79864) (Retired).
- Squadron Leader Reginald Leonard Cater (123884).
- Squadron Leader Jacques Pierre Croizat (4094378).
- Squadron Leader Harold Elvey Earnshaw (535424).
- Squadron Leader Norman George (591499).
- Squadron Leader George Joseph Anthony Ferdinand Green (3121485).
- Squadron Leader Arthur Sidney Ilott (1880590).
- Squadron Leader Ronald Peter James (49560).
- Squadron Leader Timothy Kennedy, DFC (182180).
- Squadron Leader Hugh Leigh (51303).
- Squadron Leader Leonard Roy Moxam (2458978) (Retired).
- Squadron Leader Geoffrey Satherley (49138).
- Squadron Leader William Laurence Smyth (1908446).
- Squadron Leader Harold John Kevin Vieyra, MB, BS (506363).
- Squadron Leader Norman Watts (52192), Royal Air Force (Retired).
- Squadron Leader Paul Mitchell Worthington (607034).
- Acting Squadron Leader Bernard Leslie Hunter (124797).
- Acting Squadron Leader William Henry Charles Jennings (68338), Royal Air Force Volunteer Reserve (Training Branch).
- Acting Squadron Leader Ernest John Prince (109652).
- Flight Lieutenant Donald Albert Bennett (579569).
- Flight Lieutenant Robert Felix Byrne (3512200).
- Flight Lieutenant Richard Andrew Connor (183471), Royal Air Force Regiment (Retired).
- Flight Lieutenant Edward John Cadman Crane (573454).
- Flight Lieutenant Leslie Raymond Farmer (573245).
- Flight Lieutenant Roy William Gibbard (3117514).
- Flight Lieutenant James Marsden (535167).
- Flight Lieutenant Ronald Matthew Salt, AFC (607315).
- Flight Lieutenant Frederick John Sanders, BEM (569829).
- Flight Lieutenant Arthur Oliver Sharples (968370).
- Flight Lieutenant Keith Watson (3132383).
- Acting Flight Lieutenant Cecil Frederick James Heath (63533), Royal Air Force Volunteer Reserve (Training Branch).
- Flying Officer Bernard Roy Legg (1420631), Royal Air Force Regiment.
- Flying Officer Norman James Warnes (4000692).
- Master Air Electronics Operator Thomas McHugh, DFC, AFM (1215791).
- Warrant Officer William Ronald Barsby (612080).
- Warrant Officer Francis William Bowie (519638).
- Warrant Officer Charles Alphonsus Curran (591709).
- Warrant Officer John Walter Dillon (520008).
- Warrant Officer William George Kenneth Dingle (591383).
- Warrant Officer Peter Hoyland Higgins (941050).
- Warrant Officer John Alfred Middleton (529883).
- Warrant Officer Dennis Lloyd Teasdale (643684).
- Warrant Officer Lydia Wilcock (897283), Women's Royal Air Force.
- Warrant Officer Class I Walter William Holden, Royal Rhodesian Air Force.

Civil Division

- William Charles Abbott, Technical Grade I, Ministry of Public Building & Works.
- William John Abraham, Senior Executive Officer, Board of Customs & Excise.
- Ernest James Adams, JP, Trade Union Vice-Chairman, Merseyside District Advisory Committee, North Western Regional Board for Industry.
- Noel Alexander Adrain, JP, District Commandant, Ulster Special Constabulary.
- Reginald William Alexander, Superintending Instructor, Headquarters No. 24 Group, RAF Rudloe Manor, Ministry of Defence (Royal Air Force).
- Rachel Elinor Anderdon, Vice-Chairman, Taunton, Yeovil & District War Pensions Committee.
- Oliver Smith Anderson, Export Director, H. S. Whiteside & Company Ltd. For services to export.
- Ernest Frederick Armstrong, Managing Clerk, Sherwood & Company, Parliamentary Agents.
- Bernard Ash, Executive Engineer, Post Office Laboratories, Wembley, General Post Office.
- Sydney Hayes Ashburner, Technical Works Officer, Grade I, Ministry of Power.
- John Backhouse, Secretary to the British Waterways Board.
- Victor Edward Ronald Bailey, Higher Executive Officer, Ministry of Pensions & National Insurance.
- Annie Ball. For political services in Northampton.
- Beatrice Annie Barker, JP. For political and public services in Hereford.
- William Cyril Beale, JP. For political and public services in Glamorgan.
- Mary Martin Craigie Bell. For political services.
- William Bell, Manager, Naval Gun Mounting Department, Vickers-Armstrongs (Engineers) Ltd., Newcastle-upon-Tyne.
- Observer Commander William George Belton, Group Commandant, No. 14 Group, Royal Observer Corps.
- Patricia Frances Carson Bennett. For services to the Ex-Services Mental Welfare Society.
- Constance Hope Benson, Senior Sister, Royal Victoria Hospital, Belfast.
- George Stanley Bentley, Second Assistant Engineer (Control Engineer), Engineering Department, Manchester Area, North Western Electricity Board.
- John Squire Bentley, Temporary Executive Officer, No. 35 Maintenance Unit, RAF Heywood, Ministry of Defence (Royal Air Force).
- Bertrand William Bezodis, Inspector of Taxes (Higher Grade), Board of Inland Revenue.
- Roy Oliver Binet, MC, Chairman, Jersey Branch, Soldiers, Sailors & Airmen's Families Association.
- Thomas Arthur Bish, ERD, Executive Engineer, Telephone Manager's Office, Nottingham General Post Office.
- Captain Charles Blakey, Master, MV Lancastrian Prince, Furness, Withy & Company Ltd.
- Victor George Blewden, BEM, Deputy Assistant Chief Officer, London Fire Brigade.
- Roger Charles Blunt, Secretary, Cake & Biscuit Alliance Ltd.
- William Boggon, Manager, Ravensworth Ann Colliery, Northumberland & Durham Division, National Coal Board.
- Richard Mason Bompas, Group Secretary, West Cumberland Hospital Management Committee.
- Margaret Boothman, County Superintendent (Nursing), County of Buckingham, St. John Ambulance Brigade.
- Norah Boothman, lately Head of Department of Science, Luton College of Technology.
- Ian Alexander Borland, Secretary, Honorary Committee of Management, Incorporated Thames Nautical Training College, HMS Worcester.
- Helen May Bottrill, Senior Executive Officer, Paymaster General's Office.
- Sidney Charles Alfred Bowler, Divisional Administration Officer, Ministry of Aviation.
- Samuel Bowles, Assistant Manager, Electrical Testing Departments, Harland & Wolff Ltd., Belfast.
- Ronald Bowlzer. For political and public services in Derbyshire.
- Alderman Oliver Frederick Douglas Bradley. For political and public services in Stafford.
- Brenda Bradley Breakwell, Secretary and Manager, Kensington Housing Trust.
- Clifford Ellett Bream, Commandant, Leicestershire & Rutland Special Constabulary.
- Robert Arthur Brewer, District Reporter, Hull Daily Mail.
- Helena Brown, Welfare Officer, Ministry of Health.
- Reginald William Brown, Chief Instructor, Wimbledon and District Training Centre, Royal Automobile Club Auto-Cycle Union.
- Robert Howard Brown, Principal, Finaghy Primary School, Country Antrim.
- William Peter Brownridge, Chairman, Warrington Savings Committee.
- Tom Bucknall, National Savings District Member for North East Derbyshire.
- Amy Ernestine Buller, Founder and Past Warden, St. Cathrine's College, Cumberland Lodge, Windsor Great Park.
- John Sydney Buller, Test and First Class County Cricket Umpire.
- David Francis John Byrne, Senior Executive Officer, Ministry of Pensions & National Insurance.
- Arthur Donald Caddick, Honorary Secretary, Smethwick Savings Committee.
- George Lawson Caldwell, Honorary Secretary, Edinburgh Building Safety Group.
- James Caldwell, Senior Assistant Engineer (Communications), South of Scotland Electricity Board;
- Captain Alexander Cant, Master, MV Scotstoun, J. & J. Denholm (Management) Ltd.
- Gilbert Eric Cawkwell, Full-time Official of the Amalgamated Society of Painters and Decorators.
- Edith Elizabeth Chamberlain, County Organiser, Staffordshire, Women's Voluntary Service.
- Geoffrey Charles Chouffot, Senior Flight Operations Inspector, Directorate of Aviation Safety, Ministry of Aviation.
- Alfred James Cleare, Technical Grade I, Ministry of Defence (Army).
- Albert John Coare, Manager, Documentation and Codification Contracts, H. J. Smart Ltd., Middlesex.
- Elinor Phyllis Cockburn, Housing Manager, Bracknell Development Corporation.
- James Victor Coe, Member, Wiltshire Agricultural Executive Committee.
- Alan Tom George Coleborn, Chief Draughtsman, Ministry of Defence (Royal Navy).
- Derek Hamilton Collins, Senior Experimental Officer, Ministry of Defence (Royal Navy).
- Greta Collyns, General Secretary, Scottish Girl Guides Association.
- Malcolm Ridyard Compston, Temporary Senior Technical Examining Officer, Ministry of Defence (Royal Navy).
- Muriel Lilian Cooke, lately Examinations Officer, National Institute for Housecraft (Employment & Training) Ltd.
- George Corbett, Staff Officer, Ministry of Home Affairs for Northern Ireland.
- Gillian Ellen Cornish, BEM, Executive Officer, HM Treasury.
- Albert John Courtney, Senior Executive Officer, Central Office of Information.
- John Younie Coutts, Honorary Secretary, Scottish Amateur Swimming Association.
- William Cowie, Fisherman, Port of Buckie. For services to the Scottish inshore fishing industry.
- Edwin Cuthbert Cory Crapp, Head of Supply Section, Conference, Services and Supply Department, Diplomatic Service Administration Office.
- Lancelot George Francis Cross, Head Forester, Forestry Commission.
- George Henry Crump, Manager, Felling Government Training Centre and Industrial Rehabilitation Unit, Ministry of Labour.
- Wilfred George Cunningham. For political and public services in Norfolk.
- Walter Robertson Cuthbert, Honorary Vice-President, Scottish Community Drama Association.
- Charles Edward Robert Darby, E.D, Senior Executive Officer, Colonial Office.
- Gwilym Davies, JP, Member, Caernarvonshire Agricultural Executive Committee.
- William Glanfrwyd Davies, Surveyor and Chief Public Health Inspector, Newtown and Llanllwchaiarn Urban District Council.
- Wilfred Owen Davis, Engineer, Research Department, Aviation Division, S. Smith & Sons (England) Ltd.
- Eric Dawes, Divisional Officer, West Riding of Yorkshire Fire Brigade.
- Frank Leslie Dawkins, Field Officer Grade II, Ministry of Agriculture, Fisheries & Food.
- Elizabeth Dobson, Chairman, Spennymoor Savings Committee.
- Robert Stevenson Doig, MD, ChB, Area Medical Officer, Isle of Lewis.
- Robert Neill Dougall, Newsreader, Television News, British Broadcasting Corporation.
- Edgar James Dovey, Senior Executive Officer, Ministry of Housing & Local Government.
- Annie Downie, lately District Nurse, island of Fetlar, Shetland.
- Alfred William Francis Drake, Managing Director, Downe & Baker Ltd., Devon.
- Harry Sinclair Drever, JP, Honorary Secretary, Shetland Local Savings Committee.
- Edward Donald Drew, Chairman, Richmond-upon-Thames Savings Committee.
- Henry Patrick Durrell, Attached Ministry of Defence.
- Frank Humphreys-Edwards, Planning Officer, Scottish Development Department.
- Frederick George Ellington, Superintendent, Mid Anglia Constabulary.
- Frederick George Elliott, JP, Sales Superintendent, Telephone Managers Office, Coventry, General Post Office.
- Frank Thomas Emery. For political and public services in Derbyshire and Staffordshire.
- Edith Elsie Evans, Confidential Secretary and Personal Assistant to the Works Manager, John I. Thornycroft & Company Ltd., Southampton.
- Glyn Barrett Evans, County Ambulance Officer, Carmarthenshire.
- John Evans, General Manager, East Anglian Trustee Savings Bank.
- Kathleen Esther Evans, Senior Woman Technical Adviser, Central Council of Physical Recreation.
- Bruce Raymond Farrant, Higher Executive Officer, Ministry of Defence (Royal Navy).
- Dorothy Mary Fell, Senior Machine Operator, No. 16 Maintenance Unit, RAF Stafford, Ministry of Defence (Royal Air Force).
- Major Francis Waldemar Firminger, MC, Divisional Organiser, Metropolitan Division, Royal Society for the Prevention of Accidents.
- Olive Gertrude Fisher, Centre Organiser, Enfield, Women's Voluntary Service.
- Alderman Michael Fitzpatrick. For public services in Wakefield, Yorkshire.
- Dorothy Eleanor Fletcher, Vice-Chairman, Wallasey Local Employment Committee.
- William Flood, Clerical Officer, Headquarters Eastern Command, Ministry of Defence (Army).
- Lewis Hamilton Ford, Experimental Officer, National Physical Laboratory, Teddington.
- William Henry Ford, Executive Officer, Ministry of Pensions & National Insurance.
- John Bryan Forster, Divisional Officer, Auxiliary Fire Service, Kent Fire Brigade.
- Thomas Alexander Fortune, Chairman, Scottish Society for Mentally Handicapped Children.
- Audrie Olive Ethel Francis, Grade 8(e) of HM Diplomatic Service, Foreign Office.
- John Gordon French, Chief Officer, Norwich Fire Brigade.
- James John Frost, Senior Probation Officer, London.
- William Charles Frost, Senior Experimental Officer, Gas Standards Branch, Ministry of Power.
- Nora Mary Gaetjens, Assistant, Registry & Records Section, Audience Research, British Broadcasting Corporation.
- Ernest Gardner, JP, Alderman, City of Lancaster.
- Charles James Frederick Gilmore, Special Appointment, Chaplains Branch, Ministry of Defence (Royal Air Force).
- Herbert Frederick Girling, Assistant Secretary, The United Services Trustee.
- John William Godsell, Detective Chief Superintendent, Metropolitan Police.
- Douglas Wickham Goodman, Senior Executive Officer, Diplomatic Service Administration Office.
- George Frederick Goodman, Divisional Officer, Birmingham Fire Brigade.
- Frederick Norman Goss, Manager, Lochaber Works, Fort William, British Aluminium Company Ltd.
- Percy Sassoon Gourgey. For political and public services.
- Mysie Howie Graham, Organiser of School Meals, Renfrewshire.
- Cecil Edgar Green, Senior Accountant, Board of Trade.
- George William Greenway, Attached Ministry of Defence.
- John William Greenwood, Superintendent Engineer, Hailsham Hospital Management Committee.
- Ifor Bowen Griffith, Chairman, Housing Committee, Council of the Royal Borough of Caernarvon.
- Albert Edward Hall, Technical Works Grade I, Rothamsted Experimental Station, Harpenden, Hertfordshire.
- Doris Lilian Alice Hall, Regional Nursing Officer, Birmingham Regional Hospital Board.
- Francis Harry Hall, Senior Executive Officer, Ministry of Agriculture, Fisheries & Food.
- John Rutherford Menzies Hamilton, Senior Draughtsman in charge of Central Drawing Office, Ministry of Transport.
- Bertha Lilian Hamment, Superintendent, Ladywell Residential Nursery, Lewisham.
- James Lawrence Hammill. For political and public services in Barnsley.
- James Hanna, Clerk, Ballymoney Rural District Council, County Antrim.
- Reginald Harding, Technical Grade I, Ministry of Public Building & Works.
- Edward Charles Thomas Hardy, lately Senior Executive Officer, Home Office.
- Frederick Harrison, Senior Staff Photographer, Northcliffe Newspapers Group, Ltd.
- George Harrison, Member of The Beatles.
- Albert Edward Harvey. For services to Nursing and old peoples welfare in Middlesex.
- Ina Beatrice Harvey, Grade 3 Officer, Ministry of Labour.
- Frank Craven Hedley, Senior Executive Officer, Ministry of Pensions & National Insurance.
- John Hemingway, JP, Part-time Tutor to the Services, Northern Command.
- George William Herrick, Chief Public Health Inspector, Hammersmith.
- George Mundell Hetherington, MC, MB, ChB, JP, General Practitioner in Clackmannan.
- Frank Lawrence Hill, Chief Experimental Officer, Atomic Weapons Research Establishment, Aldermaston.
- John Hill, Superintendent of Works, Ministry of Public Building & Works.
- Maude Adelaide Hill, lately Junior Staff Officer, Ministry of Development for Northern Ireland.
- Colonel William Arthur Hinchcliffe, TD, DL, Chairman, National Assistance Appeal Tribunal, Huddersfield.
- Doris May Hollyoake. For political and public services in Oldbury.
- Joan Beatrice Hopgood, HM Inspector of Factories IA, Ministry of Labour.
- Edward Hopkins, JP. For political and public services in Northwich.
- John Laurie Howison, Assistant Chief Cartographer, Ministry of Overseas Development.
- John Henry Hurst. For political and public services in Derbyshire.
- Dorothy Hyman. For services to Women's Athletics.
- Grace Adelaide Mary Inglis, lately Assistant Secretary, Royal Air Force Benevolent Fund.
- George Irons, Higher Executive Officer, Ministry of Defence (Royal Air Force).
- Thomas Carlisle Irwin, District Inspector, Royal Ulster Constabulary.
- Arthur Jackson, Chairman, Doncaster, Mexborough and District War Pensions Committee.
- Oliver James. For political and public services in Monmouthshire.
- Betty Helen Fyfe-Jamieson, County Organiser, West Suffolk, Women's Voluntary Service.
- William Jamieson, Senior Planner, Central Planning Department, British Petroleum Company Ltd.
- Frederick Sydney Johnson, DSC, Trawler Skipper, Grimsby.
- Ernest Horsford Jones, Chief Superintendent, Sorting Office, Nottingham, General Post Office.
- John Glyn Jones, Managing Director, Corgi Hosiery Ltd. For services to export.
- Meirion Jones, Headmaster, Bala County Primary School.
- Monica Martin-Jones, Superintendent Physiotherapist, Westminster Hospital Group.
- Reginald Henry George Jones, JP, National Savings District Member for South Somerset.
- Esther Eleanor Kelly, Headmistress, Patrick School, Isle of Man.
- John Kennedy, Headmaster, St. Aloysius Roman Catholic Junior Mixed School, Huyton, Lancashire.
- John Wisnom Kerr, Organiser of the Building and Government Workers Section (Northern Ireland), Amalgamated Transport & General Workers Union.
- Clifford Dudley Kitching, Engineer II, Royal Ordnance Factory, Woolwich, Ministry of Defence (Army).
- Lesley Victor Kleeman, Manager (Construction), Scenic Servicing, British Broadcasting Corporation.
- Albert Peter Lamy, BEM, lately Chief Officer, Guernsey Island Police Force.
- Frederick John Lawrence, Senior Personnel Assistant, Office of the Works Manager (Road Services), London Transport Board.
- Joseph Leeming, Chairman, Advisory Committee of Fairfield Experimental Horticulture Station.
- George Sydney Lees, Executive Officer, Board of Trade.
- Ivy Ford Lees, Headmistress, Middleport County Infants School.
- John Winston Lennon, Member of The Beatles.
- Ernest Ralph Lesley, Grade 4 Officer, Ministry of Labour.
- Cecil Stanley Frederick Levon, Clerical Officer, Aeroplane & Armament Experimental Establishment, Salisbury, Ministry of Aviation.
- Catherine Marguerite Lewis, Head of Training Department, Headquarters, Women's Voluntary Service.
- Dorothy Lewis, Voluntary Clothing Room Manager, Ministry of Defence (Royal Navy).
- Jack Lewis, Clerical Officer, Ministry of Agriculture, Fisheries & Food.
- Cecilia Gladys Lingwood, Grade 4 Officer, Ministry of Labour.
- Philip Newsam Linton, lately Warden, Luxborough Lodge Home for the aged and infirm.
- Donald Malcolm Lister, Technical Manager, Bartram & Sons Ltd. For services to export.
- Iris Mary Lobb, Chief Officer, Welfare Section, Civil Defence Corps, Bristol.
- Alfred Harold Lugg, Member, Horticulture Sub-Committee of Hertfordshire Agricultural Executive Committee. For services to Horticulture.
- James Paul McCartney, Member of The Beatles.
- Sheila May McDougall, Higher Clerical Officer, General Post Office.
- Samuel George McMeekin, lately Higher Executive Officer, Office of the Director of Public Prosecutions.
- Norman French McMinnis, Chief Clerk, Land Registry, Ministry of Finance for Northern Ireland.
- Hugh Rose MacQueen, Chief Superintendent and Deputy Chief Constable, Aberdeen City Police.
- Leonard Fitzgerald Mansell, Secretary, National Council of Building Material Producers.
- John William Martin, Higher Executive Officer, Cabinet Office.
- Louis George Martin, Weightlifter, for services to Athletics.
- Michael William Blount May, Member of No. 11(F) (Brooklands) Squadron Committee, Air Training Corps.
- Captain William Mendus, Master, MV Hollybank, Andrew Weir & Company Ltd.
- Victor Robert Joseph Merrett, Acting Chief Architectural and Civil Engineering Assistant, Ministry of Public Building & Works.
- James Harold Mills. For political and public services in Sherburn-in-Elmet.
- James Gordon Milne, Higher Executive Officer, Department of Agriculture & Fisheries for Scotland.
- Douglas Moir, Sheriff Clerk, Banff.
- Charles Arthur Moore, Sales Manager, Polygram Casting Company Ltd. For services to export.
- Frank Moran, lately Golf Writer, The Scotsman.
- Margaret Paterson More, Centre Organiser, Paisley Large Burgh, Women's Voluntary Service.
- Wallace Mortimer Morfey, Chairman, Ipswich and District Youth Employment Committee.
- Julia Mary Agnes Morgan. For political and public services in Lincolnshire.
- Rhyllis Edith Morrison, Superintendent of Typists, Nottingham Divisional Office, Ministry of Agriculture, Fisheries & Food.
- Marjorie Lucy Moss, Grade 4 Officer, Ministry of Labour.
- William King Moxley, Higher Executive Officer, Ministry of Pensions & National Insurance.
- Doris Rachel Aked Murray, Member of the Committee of Friends, North West Durham Hospitals Group.
- John Murray. For services to the Highlanders Institute, Glasgow.
- Victor William Neate, lately Collector of Taxes (Higher Grade), Board of Inland Revenue.
- The Reverend David Thompson Neely, Member, County Down Savings Committee.
- Laurence Bruce Nicolson, Estate Surveyor, Ministry of Public Building & Works.
- James Oakes, Founder, Leader and Chairman of the Brindle Heath Lads Club.
- Dennis Alfred O'Dell, Export Manager, Payen Ltd. For services to export.
- Maurice Charles Oldham, Chief Chemist and Metallurgist, Vickers-Armstrongs (Engineers) Ltd., Barrow-in-Furness.
- John Henry Oliver, Accountant, Board of Customs & Excise.
- Eleanor Owen, Non-Medical Supervisor of Midwives, Superintendent Nursing Officer, Merioneth County Council.
- Frank Edward Page, Senior Radio Officer, SS Loch Garth, Associated Electrical Industries Ltd.
- Cyril Norman Parish, Senior Overseas Travelling Representative, British Engineers Small Tools & Equipment Company Ltd. For services to export.
- Minnie Graham Parker (Mrs. Perishick), Hospitality Secretary, Victoria League in Scotland.
- Frederick James Parsons, Observer, County Observatory, Ross-on-Wye.
- John Bertram George Haddon Armstrong-Payne, Chairman, Lavapine Ltd., Dundee. For services to export.
- Percy Benjamin Payton, President, National Union of Flint Glass Workers.
- Sarah Harriet Maud Peek, Higher Executive Officer, National Assistance Board.
- Sydney James Pellow, lately Clerical Officer, Ministry of Defence (Royal Navy).
- Rex Henry Percy, Chairman of the Guildford Sea Cadet Unit.
- George William Perrett, Executive Officer, Ministry of Pensions & National Insurance.
- Henry James Phillips, Superintendent of Binding, British Museum.
- Ivy Gladys Pickford, Member of the Regional Staff, Wales, Women's Voluntary Service.
- Frederick William Player, lately Chief Associate, Crown Office & Associates Department, Supreme Court of Judicature.
- Robert John Porter, Inspector of Taxes, Board of Inland Revenue.
- Ethel Barbara Potter, Member of Regional Staff, Nottingham, Women's Voluntary Service.
- William John White Preece, Headmaster, St Chad's County Secondary School, Tilbury.
- Leslie Eric Preston, Engineer (Mechanical & Electrical), Ministry of Public Building & Works.
- Charles Edwin Puddle, Head Gardener, Bodnant Gardens, Denbighshire.
- Doreen Elizabeth Pugh. For services as Secretary to the late Right Honourable Sir Winston Spencer Churchill, KG, OM, CH.
- Arthur Thomas Stanley Rayner, Regional Welfare Officer, Liverpool Street, British Railways Board.
- Bertram Edward Rayner, Senior Technical Officer, Ministry of Public Building & Works.
- Philip Martyn Reason, Senior Executive Officer, Ministry of Agriculture, Fisheries & Food.
- Ella Richardson, Inspector of Taxes (Higher Grade), Board of Inland Revenue.
- Ethel May Ringe, Higher Clerical Officer, Board of Inland Revenue.
- John Joseph Donald Rivers. For services to the British Legion.
- Alderman Jeanette Pearl Roberts, JP. For public services in Essex.
- George Robinson. For political and public services in Whitburn.
- Scipio James Robinson. For political services in Petersfield.
- William John Marshall Robinson. For services to the Poultry Breeding Industry of Northern Ireland.
- Charles Henry Rogers, Technical Class Officer, Grade A, Ministry of Defence (Royal Navy).
- Henry James Rose, Technical Class Grade I, Royal Aircraft Establishment, Ministry of Aviation.
- Albert Leith Ruscoe, Head Postmaster, Chelmsford.
- Ailsa Russell, Attached Ministry of Defence.
- Charles Eric Sargeant, Information Officer, Ministry of Defence (Royal Air Force).
- Celia Magdalena Seymour, formerly Senior Blind Welfare Officer, Middlesex County Council.
- George Edward Sharp, Executive Officer, London Postal Region, General Post Office.
- Sidney Fredrick Sharpe, Senior Executive Officer, Government Communications Headquarters, Foreign Office.
- Alderman Robert Shotton. For political and public services in Durham.
- Margaret Maud Skeet, Honorary Secretary, Community Advisory Committee, Bristol Council of Social Service.
- John Augustus Slade, Chief Draughtsman, Ordnance Survey, Southampton, Ministry of Agriculture, Fisheries & Food.
- Robert Hans Sloane, Deputy Director, Contracts Division, HM Stationery Office.
- Douglas William Smith, Senior Warning Officer, Truro Group, Air Raid Warning Organisation.
- Edgar Charles Houghton Smith, Engineer II, Ministry of Aviation.
- George Smith. For political services in Swansea.
- Harry Vivian Smith, Training Manager, Assembly Division, Ford Motor Company, Ltd.
- Mabel Louisa Smith, Clerical Officer, Department of Education & Science.
- Phyllis Mayland Smith, lately Chief Superintendent of Typists, Ministry of Defence (Royal Navy).
- William Arthur Alexander Smith, Higher Executive Officer, Royal Ordnance Factory, Radway Green, Ministry of Defence (Army).
- Catherine Nora Snelling. For services as Secretary to the late Right Honourable Sir Winston Spencer Churchill, KG, OM, CH.
- Victor Clarence Spary, Chairman, Linslade and Wing Savings Committee.
- Howard John Spencer, Senior Executive Officer, Ministry of Transport.
- Reginald John Spraggins, MM. For political and public services in Norfolk.
- Charles Richard Squires, Programme Director, Rediffusion Television Ltd.
- Frank Roland Stacey, Experimental Officer, Ministry of Overseas Development.
- Marcel William Staite. For political and public services in Worcestershire.
- Ringo Starr (Richard Starkey), Member of The Beatles.
- Marjorie Trevelyan Stephens. For services to the United Nations Children's Fund.
- Horace Alfred Edwin Stepney, Surveyor, Board of Customs & Excise.
- John Dixon Stewart, JP, Councillor, Meriden Rural District Council, Warwickshire.
- Marguerite Ellen Gaudin Stocker, Governor, HM Prison Askham Grange, Home Office.
- Charles James Stribling, lately Deputy Chief Driving Examiner, Ministry of Transport.
- Marjorie Doris Strong, Divisional Director, Tiverton Division, Devon Branch, British Red Cross Society.
- Harry Stubbs, Organiser of the Worcestershire Rural Community Council.
- Robert George Sullivan, Honorary Secretary, County Fermanagh Savings Committee.
- Ivan James Sutton, Founder and Chairman, City Music Society.
- John Edward Swinburn, Departmental Manager, Armament Forgings & Services Liaison Officer, English Steel Corporation Ltd., Sheffield.
- Kathleen Isabella Tallent, Higher Executive Officer, Ministry of Pensions & National Insurance.
- Horace Tattersall, Conductor, Blackburn Music Society.
- Willielma Yuill Taylor, Infants Mistress, Copeland Road Secondary School, Glasgow.
- Glyn Thomas. For political and public services in Anglesey.
- Rita Myfanwy Thomas, Senior Executive Officer, London (Heathrow) Airport, Ministry of Aviation.
- William Thomasson, Chairman, Barking and Newham War Pensions Committee.
- Dick Thompson. For services to Paraplegic Sport.
- Alexander Charles Graham Thomson, JP, Chief Warden, Civil Defence Corps, Carlisle.
- Ernest Arthur Thorogood, Chief Telecommunications Superintendent, North Area, London, General Post Office.
- Alfred Ernest Tingle, Drainage and Water Supply Officer, Grade II, Ministry of Agriculture, Fisheries & Food.
- Reginald Clarke Titman, Engineer II, Atomic Weapons Division, Ministry of Aviation.
- Minnie Theresa Todhunter, Executive Officer, Ministry of Pensions & Insurance.
- William Clifford Lewis Tonkin, Higher Clerical Officer, Law Officers Department.
- Frederick William Toomer, Chief Designer Naval Contracts, Aish & Company Ltd., Dorset.
- Ernest Stanley Tooth, lately Dock Superintendent, India & Millwall Docks, Port of London Authority.
- Percy Walter Trengrouse, Clerical Officer, National Assistance Board.
- Dorothy Frances Urwin, Clerical Officer (Secretary), Ministry of Defence.
- Major Adam Gibson Vallance, TD, Superintendent of the Training Rehabilitation Centre and Workshops for the War Blinded, Linburn.
- Phyllis Mary Vasey, lately Clerical Officer (Secretary), Public Trustee Office.
- Robert Harold Veal, Trade Union Chairman, Hull District Advisory Committee, East and West Ridings of Yorkshire Regional Board for Industry.
- Arthur Samuel Alfred Vickerage, Deputy Regional Commissioner, National Savings Committee.
- Anne Sanders Vidler, Deputy Commissioner, Toc H. Services Clubs, Germany.
- Diana Barnato Walker. For services to the Air Transport Auxiliary and the Girls Venture Corps.
- Cyril Percy Walton, Principal Youth Employment Officer, Worcestershire.
- Dorothy Marjorie Warren, Matron, Gregory House Old Peoples Home, Grantham.
- Reginald Charles Wassell, Head of Music Department, Portsmouth Technical High School.
- David Masson Watt, lately Head Forester, Forestry Commission, Scotland.
- Norman George Webb, Clerical Officer, Ministry of Health.
- James Welsby, JP. For political and public services in Leyland.
- Leonard Walter Wenman, Chairman, Panel of Examiners of the Guild of Air Pilots & Navigators.
- Dorothy Elma West, Matron of the Royal Naval & Royal Marine Maternity Home, Portsmouth.
- Frank Westfield, Higher Executive Officer, Commonwealth Relations Office.
- Margaret Brash White, Honorary Secretary of a National Savings Group.
- George Dallas Whitelaw, lately Senior Ship Surveyor, Marine Survey, Hull, Board of Trade.
- Nellie Whiteley, lately domiciliary midwife, Shipley, Yorkshire.
- Joseph Andrew Dalgetty Whyte, Liaison Officer to Royal Canadian Air Force, Scottish Aviation Ltd., Prestwick Airport.
- Dorothy Evelyn Wigg, Clerical Officer, Ministry of Defence (Army).
- Frederick William Wilkinson, Technical Grade I, Ministry of Public Building & Works.
- John Hywel, Williams, Headmaster, Welburn Hall Residential School for Physically Handicapped Pupils, Kirbymoorside.
- Thomas Leonard Williams, Principal, Lickey Grange School for the Blind and Alexandra College for the Blind.
- Duncan Roderick Wills, Development Manager, Watson House Research Station, The Gas Council.
- Eileen Gertrude Wilson, Executive Officer, Ministry of Defence (Royal Air Force).
- Cecil John Woodward, Foreign Sales Executive, R. A. Lister & Company Ltd. For services to export.
- William Woolfenden, Engineer-in-Charge, Independent Television Authority Transmitting Station, St. Hilary, Cowbridge, Glamorgan.
- John Percival Ernest Edward Worboys, Senior Chief Managing Clerk, Solicitors Department, Metropolitan Police.
- Sidney George Keevil Wright, Assistant County Surveyor, Herefordshire County Council.
- George Lilburn Aitchison, Acting Under-Secretary (Establishments), Ministry of Establishments & Training, Northern Nigeria.
- Brian Albinson, State Drainage and Irrigation Engineer, Selangor, Malaysia.
- James Michael Harsant Barrable, British subject resident in the Federal Republic of Cameroon.
- Irene Linda Bastable, lately Principal Matron, Ministry of Health, Tanzania.
- George Broadway, lately Senior Accountant, Northern Nigeria.
- Harriet Cartwright, British subject resident in the United States of America.
- Marjorie Annie Frances Charman, British Pro-Consul, Geneva.
- Elenora Freda Ann Clark, Senior Sister Tutor, Western Nigeria Medical Service.
- Vera Beatrice Ranson Croucher, Machine Operator Superintendent, Internal Revenue Division, Ministry of Finance, Eastern Nigeria.
- Francis Edward Dalby, British Vice-Consul, Valencia.
- Harold Furney Charles Darling, Chief Superintendent, Nigeria Police.
- Ruth Jane Doran, lately Principal Matron, Ministry of Health, Tanzania.
- Egerton Clarence Duckworth, Commercial Attaché, Her Majesty's Embassy, Athens.
- Frederick George Fenner, Superintendent of Police, Perak, Malaysia.
- Margaret Denby Feuer, British Vice-Consul, Malmö.
- Eric Thomas Henry Fitzsimmons, lately British Council Director, Bahrain.
- James Theodore Fleming, lately Senior Courts Adviser, Uganda.
- Donald Fordwood. For services to the British community in India.
- Horace George Franks, Daily Mail Correspondent in The Netherlands.
- Peter Garnham, Assistant Surveyor-General, Malaysia.
- Mary Isabel Gaskell, Personal Assistant to the Head of the United Kingdom Delegation to the Organisation for Economic Co-operation & Development.
- William Henry Tugwell Herne Goodwin, Chief Accountant and Secretary, Gaskiya Corporation, Northern Nigeria.
- Marjorie Joan Gregory, Nursing Sister, Leprosy Service, Ministry of Health, Eastern Nigeria.
- Richard Groom, Clerical Office, British High Commission, Kuala Lumpur.
- Marjorie Wilhelmina De Haan, Shorthand-typist, Her Majesty's Embassy, The Hague.
- Christine Hall. For services to the community in Ceylon.
- Stanley Hardy, Superintendent of Police, Sarawak Constabulary.
- Albert Francis Joseph Harris, British subject resident in Brussels.
- Ronald Rennie Harrison. For services to British interests in Nigeria.
- John Victor Hartman, Interpreter, British Military Government, Berlin.
- Agnes Mary Hicks, Secretary-Typist, Nigeria Public Service.
- John Hugh Cogswell Hicks, Organiser, Rural Science (Group 8), Ministry of Education, Northern Nigeria.
- Winifred Annie Buckle Holland, Principal Matron, Kuching General Hospital, State of Sarawak.
- Ernest Jackson, Higher Executive Officer, British High Commission, New Delhi.
- Thomas Joseph Johnson, Hide Improvement Officer, Uganda.
- Joseph Hezekiah Keeble, Regional Fire Officer, Western Nigeria.
- Rex Ivan Lagerstedt, Senior Assistant Comptroller of Inland Revenue, Northern Region, Malaysia.
- Elizabeth Muir Dow Larsen, British subject resident in Denmark.
- Gerard Stephen Leader, Adviser in Fire Services, Ghana.
- Ludwik Lotringer, Principal Agricultural Officer, Northern Nigeria.
- Donald Stanley Luffman, Cinema Officer, Western Nigeria Public Service.
- Muriel Madeleine Mackay, Headmistress, Raeburn Park School, State of Singapore.
- Marion Gladys Lang Majdalany, British subject resident in the Argentine Republic.
- Major James Knox Matthew, British subject resident in France.
- Cynthia Mary Mathews, Shorthand-Typist, Her Majesty's Embassy, Beirut.
- Margaret Brown McLean, Palantypist for Parliament in Uganda.
- Jane McLoughlin, lately Nursing Sister, Office of the British Chargé d'Affaires, Peking.
- Mollie Messing, British subject resident in the United States of America.
- Colin George Frederick Millington, Superintendent of Police, Sarawak Constabulary.
- Gerald Hugh Alan Murphy, lately Head of Criminal Investigation Department, Uganda.
- Albert Augustus Charles Nash, Commercial Attaché, Her Majesty's Embassy, Rome.
- Ernest Henry Noble, Second Secretary (Commercial), Her Majesty's Embassy, Tunis.
- Robert John Osborne, Agricultural Manager, Northern Nigeria Development Corporation.
- Gerald Joseph Parry, Senior Technical Officer, Western Nigeria.
- Edwin Charles Patient, Principal, Government College, Keffi, Northern Nigeria.
- Catherine Ingram Petrie, Confidential Secretary to Her Majesty's High Commissioner in Brunei.
- Kenneth Alexander Price, Deputy Chief Federal Immigration Officer, Ministry of Internal Affairs, Nigeria.
- John Ridley. For services to the British community in Jinja, Uganda.
- Joffre Ringsell, Government Printer, Uganda.
- Rosemary Harvey Mary Passmore Rowe, Archivist, Her Majesty's Embassy, Santo Domingo.
- Paul Franklin Rudd, Junior Attaché, Her Majesty's Embassy, Santo Domingo.
- Ronald Frederick Skitt, Communications Officer, British High Commission, Nicosia.
- Annie Georgina Soper, Missionary, lately San Martin, Peru.
- Kenneth Stephenson, Stores Superintendent, Public Works Department, State of Sarawak.
- John Thomas Stevens, Senior Civil Engineer, State of Singapore.
- Robert Stewart, Internal Auditor, Western Nigeria.
- Frank Martin Taylor, British Vice-Consul, St. Louis.
- Theodore Patrick Tenten, Higher Executive Officer, British High Commission, Port of Spain.
- Donald Hamilton Tod, lately General Manager, Nigerian National Shipping Line.
- Kenneth Norman Toms, District Surveyor, State of Sabah.
- Dorothy Galloway Torrance, Nursing Supervisor, Pakistan (SEATO) Cholera Research Laboratories, Dacca, Pakistan.
- Helen Dick Tull, Chairman of the Kyrenia Branch of the British Red Cross Society, Cyprus.
- Patrick Julian Wallace, Administrative Officer Class II, Northern Nigeria.
- Martin Bertram Watts, MRCP, Medical Officer-in-Charge, Lau King Howe Hospital, Sibu, Sarawak.
- Albert Joffre Will, Communications Officer, Her Majesty's Embassy, Djakarta.
- Donald Mallett Williams, Inspector of Education (Arts & Crafts), Northern Nigeria.
- Carl Vincent Worrell, British Pro-Consul, Curaçao.
- Dulcina Elizabeth Armstrong. For social services in British Guiana.
- Peter Rennie Allen. For public services in, Fiji.
- Ahmed Saleh Bashin, Senior Labour Officer, Aden.
- Cyril Augustine Bowen, lately Assistant Postmaster of the Bahama Islands.
- Leo Humberto Bradley, Librarian, British Honduras.
- James Allardyce Campbell, Commissioner, Out Island Department, Bahamas.
- Chung Kam-chuen. For public services in Hong Kong.
- William Dainty. For public services in British Guiana.
- Inez Maria de Lourdes Soares Da Rosa, Senior Class Secretary and Stenographer, Hong Kong.
- Peter Andrew Day, lately Administrator, Tristan da Cunha.
- Claude Joseph Guy De Commarmond. For public services in Mauritius.
- Richard Pullin Fielders, Superintendent, Bermuda Police Force.
- Camille Frichot, Postmaster, Seychelles.
- Hugh Haynes Hamlett, Senior Auditor, St. Vincent.
- Elizabeth Sofia Harper. For public services in Antigua.
- David Horn, Diamond Drilling Superintendent, Geological Survey & Mines Department, Swaziland.
- Lawrence Braithwaite Howard, Workshop Manager, Public Works Department, Swaziland.
- Sheila Iu Sui-tong, Matron, Grantham Hospital, Hong Kong.
- Cecil Albert Jacobs, Financial Secretary, St. Vincent.
- The Reverend Charles Jesse. For public services in St. Lucia.
- Osea Kaloumaira, Field Officer, Agricultural Department, Fiji.
- James Kerr, Director of Civil Aviation and Senior Pilot, Falkland Islands.
- Ko Siu-wah Kwan. For social services in Hong Kong.
- Liu Ping-pui, Head Computer, Royal Observatory, Hong Kong.
- Janet Mary Longfield Lloyd. For public services in Fiji.
- Reginald McConney, Assistant Accountant General, Barbados.
- Josephine Margaret Patricia McIntosh, Headmistress, St. Anne's School, Glacis, Gibraltar.
- Mohamed Ghaleb Mohamed. For public services in Aden.
- Gideon Sapoa Nitz, Senior Executive Officer, Gilbert and Ellice Islands Colony.
- Margaret Orella. For public services in British Guiana.
- Phyllis Ena Osbourne. For public services in Grenada.
- Francis William Penhey, Executive Engineer (Roads), Public Works Department, Aden.
- Ralph Henry Picardo, Assistant Electrical Engineer, Electricity Department, Gibraltar.
- Elizabeth Catherine Pyatt, Matron, Godden Memorial Hospital, Lolowai, New Hebrides.
- Samuel Anson Rangasawmy. For public services in British Guiana.
- Harold de Lisle Rock. For public services in Barbados.
- Charles Cochrane Sachs, Lay Superintendent, St. Giles Hospital, Fiji.
- Jerome Gordon St. Bernard, Permanent Secretary, Ministry of Communications & Works, Grenada.
- Abel Caweni Sikunyana, District Officer, Bechuanaland Protectorate.
- Alfred Arthur Morgan Tatem, JP, Treasurer, Turks & Caicos Islands.
- Moses Thokoa Tlebere, Clerk to the Legislative Council, Basutoland.
- Ena Kathleen Walters, Matron, Queen Elizabeth Hospital, Barbados.
- Edward Percival Yorke, Principal, Belize Technical College, British Honduras.

State of New South Wales

- Jean Fleming Arnot. For services to the community in Sydney, State of New South Wales.
- Ethel Winifred Blaxland, of Sydney, State of New South Wales. For social welfare services.
- Mary Monica Carr, Sister in charge, Maternity Wing, Mercy Hospital, Young, State of New South Wales.
- Vera Leah Cohen. For charitable and social welfare services in the State of New South Wales.
- Betty Cuthbert. For services to athletics in the State of New South Wales.
- Rose Anne Enticknap. For services to the community in the State of New South Wales, particularly in the rehabilitation of alcoholics and on behalf of crippled and spastic children.
- David Randolph Kirkby, of Sutherland, State of New South Wales. For services to local government.
- Francis Stanislaus Maher. For services in the interests of ex-servicemen in the State of New South Wales.
- Loretto Agnes O'Connor, of Mudgee, State of New South Wales. For services to nursing.
- Edward Watman, Chairman of the Board of the Grafton Hospital, State of New South Wales.

State of Victoria

- Alice Lillian Gertrude Craig, of Camberwell, State of Victoria. For services to the community.
- Harold Thornton Grimwade. For charitable and community services in Lismore, State of Victoria.
- Harold Jeffrey Keys, JP, Deputy Secretary for the State of Victoria of the Senior Young Farmers of Victoria.
- Ivan Edward Layton. For services to the community, particularly as Executive Officer of the Melbourne Legacy Club, State of Victoria.
- Everest Albert Le Page. For services to the community and charitable organisations in Moorabbin and Cheltenham, State of Victoria.
- Alma Rogers. For her services to the First Auxiliary of Mount Royal Special Hospital for the Aged, State of Victoria.
- Councillor Henry Lester Smith, JP. For services to local government and the community in Kerang, State of Victoria.

State of Queensland

- Grace Elizabeth Allt, of Brisbane, State of Queensland. For services on behalf of ex-servicemen and women.
- Thomas Beech, of Brisbane, State of Queensland. For services in the cause of ambulance work.
- Katherine Cameron Carter, lately Headmistress, Ipswich Girls' Grammar School, State of Queensland.
- Harry Corones. For community and charitable services in Charleville, State of Queensland.
- Timothy John Cotter, MB, BS, of Innisfail, State of Queensland. For services in the fields of medical welfare and research.
- John Dorney, Chairman, Chinchilla Shire Council, State of Queensland.

State of South Australia

- Sarah Louisa Bailey, of Jamestown, State of South Australia. For services to the community.
- Florence Hilda May Pollock. For community services in Clare District, State of South Australia.
- Sydney William Rogers, of Stirling District, State of South Australia. For services to the community, particularly to returned ex-servicemen.
- Margaret Ann Young, of Port Augusta, State of South Australia. For services to the community.

State of Western Australia

- Charles Austin Gardner. For services in the advancement of the knowledge of the flora of the State of Western Australia.
- Victor Lewis Steffanoni, President of the Young Australia League in the State of Western Australia.
- Alice Williams. For services to the community, particularly in connection with the Country Women's Association of the State of Western Australia.

State of Tasmania

- Corrie Isobel Bugg, JP, of Queenstown, State of Tasmania. For public, community and charitable services.
- William Carl Burrows, of Hobart, State of Tasmania. For services to the community, particularly to youth and crippled children.
- Maxwell Robinson, ED, Secretary, Launceston Sub-Branch, Returned Sailors, Soldiers & Airmen's Imperial League of Australia, State of Tasmania.

Rhodesia

- Archibald Leslie Alison, Chairman, Sinoia Town Management Board, Rhodesia.
- Alice May Balsden. For social welfare work in Shabani, Rhodesia.
- Edward Arthur Bircher, founder & Chairman of the Rhodesian Paraplegic Games Association.
- William Jacob Springer, a pilot in the British South Africa Police Reserve, Rhodesia.
- Benjamin Austin Williams, founder and Chairman of the Intensive Conservation Committee, Bubi, Rhodesia.
- Chief Zwimba, President of the Council of Chiefs, Rhodesia.

=== Order of the Companions of Honour (CH) ===
- Patrick Maynard Stuart Blackett, lately Professor of Physics, Imperial College of Science and Technology, University of London.
- The Right Honourable Emanuel Shinwell, MP, Member of Parliament for Linlithgow 1922–1924 and 1928–1931; for the Seaham Division of Durham, 1935–1950 and for Easington since 1950. Minister of Fuel and Power, 1945–1947; Secretary of State for War, 1947–1950; Minister of Defence, 1950–1951. Chairman of the Parliamentary Labour Party since November, 1964. For political and public services.

=== Companion of the Imperial Service Order (ISO) ===
Home Civil Service

- John Bryan, Director, Forest Products Research Laboratory, Department of Scientific & Industrial Research.
- Peggy Joan Cairns, Principal, Ministry of Housing & Local Government.
- Alexander Cameron, lately Grade 2 Officer — Assistant Regional Controller, Edinburgh, Ministry of Labour.
- Colin Carruthers, Senior Civil Engineer, Ministry of Public Building & Works.
- Walter Henry Cartwright, Registrar of Death Duties, Scotland, Board of Inland Revenue.
- Edwin George Crocker, Head Postmaster, Head Post Office, Crewe.
- Eric Cruddas, Deputy Chief Architect and Deputy Director of Works (Superintending Grade Works Group), Home Office.
- Cecil Wilfred Greenwood Daring, Senior Principal Scientific Officer, Meteorological Office, Ministry of Defence (Air).
- William Darwin, Chief Executive Officer, Government Communications Headquarters, Foreign Office.
- Reginald Hugh Dowler, OBE, Chief Commissioner (Senior Chief Executive Officer), National Savings Committee.
- Francis Kenneth Duke, Senior Chief Executive Officer, Command Secretary, Headquarters, Cyprus District, Ministry of Defence (Army).
- Herbert Forrest, Local Liaison Officer (Chief Executive Officer), Scottish Development Department.
- Lewis Leonard Hall, Assistant Staff Engineer, Engineering Department, General Post Office.
- George Alexander Hill, Superintending Civil Engineer, Ministry of Public Building & Works.
- Lewis Payne, Higher Collector, Board of Customs & Excise.
- Cyril Pengelly, MBE, Senior Chief Executive Officer, HM Stationery Office.
- Reginald John Williams Pitchford, Chief Executive Officer, Ministry of Power.
- John Silyey Preston, Senior Principal Scientific Officer, National Physical Laboratory, Department of Scientific & Industrial Research.
- Donald Reginald Stanley Pursey, Senior Chief Executive Officer, Ministry of Defence (Navy).
- David Johnston Robertson, Chief Executive Officer, Ministry of Pensions & National Insurance.
- Elsie Marjorie Scott, Deputy Regional Controller, London Region, National Assistance Board.
- Henry John Steggall, Superintending Electrical Engineer, Ministry of Defence (Navy).
- Gordon Frederick Taylor, MBE, Engineer I, Electrical Inspection Directorate, Ministry of Aviation.
- Albert Leslie Thompson, Principal, Ministry of Health.
- Arthur Tibbitts, Chief Executive Officer, Ministry of Agriculture, Fisheries & Food.
- John Topping, Chief Executive Officer, Scottish Home & Health Department.
- Walter Leonard White, MBE, Establishment Officer (Chief Executive Officer), Public Record Office.
- John Richardson Wilson, Chief Inspector of Factories, Ministry of Health & Social Services for Northern Ireland.
- Philip Winter, Chief Executive Officer (Museum Superintendent), Victoria & Albert Museum, Department of Education & Science.
- Claud Cranmer Woods, MBE, Chief Assistant (Establishment Officer), HM Land Registry.

State of Victoria

- William John Price, JP, lately Assistant General Manager, Electricity Commission, State of Victoria.
- Roy Edwin Perry Stafford, lately Deputy Permanent Head of the Treasury, State of Victoria.

State of South Australia

- Andrew Ward Bowden, Public Actuary, State of South Australia.

State of Western Australia

- Reginald John Bond, Public Service Commissioner, State of Western Australia.

Rhodesia

- Hugh Leonard George, Under-Secretary (Administration), Ministry of Internal Affairs, Rhodesia.

Overseas Civil Service

- Bernard Alphonsus O'Connor, Senior Entomologist, Fiji.
- Hugh Augustus Ragg, Deputy Postmaster-General, Fiji.
- Tsang For-piu, Special Class, General Clerical Service, Hong Kong.
- Wan Ram-fan, Assistant Registrar of Shipping, Hong Kong.
- Watt Hoi-kee, Principal, Technical College, Hong Kong.

=== British Empire Medal (BEM) ===
Military Division

Royal Navy

- Chief Wren Quarters Assistant Grace Annie Barnes, Women's Royal Naval Service No. 40430.
- Chief Electrical Artificer Hartley George Brenton, D./MX 60688.
- Sick Berth Chief Petty Officer Francis Cleminson Byrne, Royal Naval Reserve M 993711.
- Chief Airfitter (A/E) Jack Morris Chadwick, L/FX 76850.
- Chief Engine Room Artificer Victor George Cooke, P/MX 60361.
- Engine Room Artificer (1st Class) Albert Ernest Crawford, P 054515.
- Chief Shipwright Henry Dealmar, E/MX 897049.
- Chief Petty Officer Cook (O) James Dowds, P/MX 57870.
- Chief Aircraft Artificer (A/E) Eric Lancelot Herbert Hughes, L/FX 78390.
- Chief Aircraft Artificer John Lawrence Kingston, L/FX 668421.
- Chief Petty Officer (Gunnery Instructor) Edgar Walter Long, D/JX 152060.
- Chief Aircraft Artificer John Edwin Marchant, L/FX 87578.
- Chief Petty Officer James Christopher Molloy, D/JX 154717.
- Chief Petty Officer Walter Thomas Neal, P/JX 329669.
- Chief Petty Officer Writer Jack Holmes Nelson, P/MX 796898.
- Master-at-Arms Albert Charles Nicholls, P/MX 716378.
- Chief Radio Supervisor Patrick Laurence O'Rourke, D/JX 778126.
- Chief Engine Room Artificer Godfrey Parris, P/MX 842933.
- Colour Sergeant Barry John Quantrill, Royal Marines, PLY/X 4245.
- Petty Officer Stores Accountant (S) Norman Derick Robson, P/MX 904787.
- Chief Petty Officer (Coxswain) Bernard Charles Scarr, P/JX 581564.
- Quartermaster Sergeant James Henry Sharland, Royal Marines, PLY/X 1917.
- Colour Sergeant Francis Edgar Slim, Royal Marines, PO/X 5492.
- Engine Room Artificer (1st Class) John Thomas Smith, P/MX 902390.
- Chief Petty Officer Writer John Francis Spencer, P/MX 847785.
- Chief Engine Room Artificer William George Tapley, D/MX 116887.
- Head Naval Nursing Auxiliary Doris Taylor, Queen Alexandra's Royal Naval Nursing Service, No.0022.
- Acting Chief Electrical Artificer Geoffrey Norman Trigg, P/MX 904049.
- Chief Ordnance Artificer William Dennis Alfred Tulip, P/MX 58323.
- Electrical Artificer (1st Class) John Joseph Webb, D/MX 102289.

Army

- 22798992 Staff Sergeant Frederick Edward George Bailey, The Queen's Royal Irish Hussars, Royal Armoured Corps.
- T/22218701 Sergeant John Bentley, Royal Army Service Corps.
- 21146271 Warrant Officer Class II (local) Bombahadur Limbu, Gurkha Signals.
- 22967885 Staff Sergeant (acting) Kenneth Bowden, Royal Army Medical Corps.
- 1127177 Staff Sergeant Michael Byrne, Army Catering Corps.
- Regimental Quartermaster Sergeant James Adolphus Clarke, The British Guiana Volunteer Force.
- 19045792 Corporal Brian Colley, The Devonshire & Dorset Regiment.
- 23872652 Corporal Jimmy Philip Durup, Corps of Royal Engineers.
- 14469891 Staff Sergeant John Henry Edge, Corps of Royal Electrical & Mechanical Engineers.
- 22983814 Sergeant John Edward Francis, Royal Corps of Signals.
- 23497989 Sergeant Ian Glendenning, Royal Army Ordnance Corps.
- 23472083 Corporal Michael Rodney Guise, Corps of Royal Engineers.
- 22521924 Staff Sergeant Gilbert John Hewlett, Corps of Royal Engineers, Territorial Army.
- 14460216 Staff Sergeant Ivor Ronald Hillier, Corps of Royal Engineers.
- 23832689 Corporal Angus Basil Holmes, Royal Army Pay Corps.
- W/158375 Staff Sergeant Alice Muriel Kefford, Women's Royal Army Corps.
- 22781153 Sergeant James Joseph McGinty, 5th Royal Inniskilling Dragoon Guards, Royal Armoured Corps, Territorial Army.
- 22250946 Sergeant William Murray, Corps of Royal Electrical & Mechanical Engineers.
- 4987706 Sergeant Marcel Edward Naseby, Royal Army Pay Corps.
- 23532803 Corporal Rowland Frank George Nash, Corps of Royal Engineers.
- W/335361 Sergeant (acting) Megan Olive Nockolds, Women's Royal Army Corps.
- 2657997 Sergeant Martin Tom Parris, Coldstream Guards.
- W/26112 Sergeant (acting) Irene Dorothy Parry, Women's Royal Army Corps.
- 21015117 Staff Sergeant Gordon Thew Pearson, The Oxfordshire & Buckinghamshire Light Infantry, Territorial Army.
- 2703452 Warrant Officer Class II (acting) Thomas Rorison, Scots Guards.
- 22802631 Sergeant (acting) Cyril Leslie Shaw, The Herefordshire Light Infantry, Territorial Army.
- 22771344 Sergeant Colin Milne Smith, Royal Corps of Signals.
- 2670764 Staff Sergeant Peter Smurthwaite, Coldstream Guards.
- S/22036485 Staff Sergeant Bernard Gerald Stevens, Royal Army Service Corps.
- 877029 Staff Sergeant Ronald Tillman, The Queen's Own Buffs, The Royal Kent Regiment.
- 22255134 Sergeant Albert George Trillo, Royal Regiment of Artillery, Territorial Army.
- W/l 53965 Sergeant (acting) Ivy Trotter, Women's Royal Army Corps.
- 5438734 Staff Sergeant Gordon Ronafd Tune, The Somerset & Cornwall Light Infantry.
- 23240574 Corporal Fernand Victor Henry Eddie Westergreen, Corps of Royal Electrical & Mechanical Engineers.
- 2549142 Staff Sergeant Norman Williams, Corps of Royal Electrical & Mechanical Engineers.
- 6845664 Corporal John Henry Windle, 2nd Green Jackets, The King's Royal Rifle Corps.

Royal Air Force

- 709007 Flight Sergeant Zygmunt Bar.
- 577481 Flight Sergeant David Richard Baum.
- 1091609 Flight Sergeant Alan Hutton.
- 523116 Flight Sergeant James Sidney Frederick Middleweek.
- Flight Sergeant Roy Bernard Pardoe, Royal Rhodesian Air Force.
- 476334 Flight Sergeant Bessie Dorothy Parsons, Women's Royal Air Force.
- 534476 Flight Sergeant Donald Jasper Thomas Snell.
- 613340 Flight Sergeant Herbert Arthur Spindler.
- 4077103 Flight Sergeant Maxwell George Edward Tankard.
- 1451889 Flight Sergeant George Taylor.
- 1807778 Chief Technician John Ahern.
- 934730 Chief Technician Stanley Cyril Batcheller.
- 1920644 Chief Technician Alan Arthur Crossland.
- 564211 Chief Technician Robert Henry Gill.
- 4032358 Chief Technician Leslie Patrick Halligan.
- 583653 Chief Technician Hugh David Leggatt.
- 579017 Chief Technician John Richard Lumley.
- 4017630 Chief Technician Dennis Nicholson.
- 579078 Chief Technician Gordon Pickles.
- 3502842 Chief Technician Charles William John Robertson.
- 975317 Sergeant Daniel Aldridge.
- 1926449 Sergeant Brian Albert Carter.
- 2062128 Sergeant Joyce Edna Dable, Women's Royal Air Force.
- 592838 Sergeant Wesley Thomas William Freary.
- 3203040 Sergeant Royston Walter Gunning.
- 2211452 Sergeant Stanley Hibbert.
- 4031096 Sergeant John Keegan.
- 2286020 Sergeant Norman Herbert Miller.
- 3127108 Sergeant Derek Arthur Murkin, Royal Air Force Regiment.
- 4121431 Sergeant Allan Kenneth Oxlade.
- 2254791 Sergeant Kenneth Prior.
- 2296543 Sergeant Angus Stuart Scott, Royal Air Force Regiment.
- 3084785 Acting Sergeant Cecil Ivan Bull.
- 588626 Corporal Keith Ernest Britton.
- 5053612 Corporal David John Clements.
- 2201214 Corporal Harold Dobson.
- 4062384 Corporal John William Moon.

Civil Division

United Kingdom

- Thomas Abram, Boatman, British Waterways Board.
- Paul Bernard Addington, Deputy Commandant, Surrey Special Constabulary.
- Joseph Thomas Archer, Experimental Worker Grade I, Explosives Research and Development Establishment, Waltham Abbey, Ministry of Aviation.
- Ronald Albert Armstrong, Assistant Superintendent (P), Western District Office, General Post Office.
- Charles Gill Asher, Clerk of Works and Ground Officer, Glenlivet Estate, Crown Estate office.
- Leonard Alexander Baga, Supervisor of Security Guards, Foreign Office.
- William Henry Bain, Chief Annunciator Operator, House of Commons.
- Herbert Arthur Baldock, Assistant to the Docks Superintendent (General Cargo), Port of Bristol Authority, Avonmouth Docks.
- Leslie William Barber, Postal and Telegraph Officer, Mount Pleasant, General Post Office.
- William John George Beard, Station Officer, HM Coastguard, Sheerness, Board of Trade.
- Albert Edwin Bearne, Technical Grade III, Ministry of Public Building & Works.
- Elsie Bell, Honorary Collector, Street Savings Group, Southwick, Sunderland.
- John Henry Bell, Workshop Superintendent (W), Rose Bros. (Gainsborough) Ltd., Gainsborough.
- Frederick George Bernsten, Principal Keeper, Cape Pembroke Lighthouse, Falkland Islands, Board of Trade.
- Gertrude Irene Bickley, Sergeant, Staffordshire Special Constabulary.
- Arthur James Birch, lately Technical Grade III, Royal Aircraft Establishment, Ministry of Aviation.
- William Francis Bishop, Warden of Cley and Salthouse Marshes Reserve, Norfolk Naturalists Trust.
- John Edgar Bonney, Local Chargeman of Shipfitters, Ministry of Defence (Royal Navy).
- Arthur Brand, Underground Road Repairer, No. 6 Area Bestwood Colliery, East Midlands Division, National Coal Board.
- Jack Bussey, Groundsman, Ministry of Public Building & Works.
- John Robert Cairns, Assistant Foreman Sheet Metal Worker, Cammell Laird & Co. (Shipbuilders & Engineers Ltd.), Birkenhead.
- Thomas Waller Carmichael, Chief Works Inspector, Glasgow North, British Railways Board.
- Frank Causer, Stores Attendant, Littleton Colliery No.2 (Cannock, South Staffs & Shrops.) Area, West Midlands Division, National Coal Board.
- Annie Emma Cheatle, Honorary Collector, Street Savings Group, Torquay.
- Frank William James Child, Chargehand, Equipment Department Workshops, British Broadcasting Corporation.
- Janet Chrystall, Manageress, Royal Navy Fleet Club, N.A.A.F.I., Faslane.
- Sydney William Collins, Carpenter, MV Bhamo, General Service Contracts.
- Thomas Henry Cook, Senior Attendant, Royal Courts of Justice, Lord Chancellor's Department.
- Alfred Gilbert Cooper, Mechanic Examiner, Royal Ordnance Factory, Cardiff, Ministry of Aviation.
- James Coulton, Foreman (Substations), Leigh District, Bolton Area, North Western Electricity Board.
- Edward Fred Cowling, General Foreman, Gas Works, Bude, Cornwall, South Western Gas Board.
- Charles Flett Craigie, Inspector and Deputy Chief Constable, Orkney Constabulary.
- Elliot Crisp, Confidential Clerk, Gibraltar, Ministry of Defence (Army).
- Lawrence Sylvester Moreton Crook, Flood Warden, Montgomeryshire.
- Harold Cyril Edgar Cummings, Engine Room Storekeeper, Greaser, MV Otaki, New Zealand Shipping Co. Ltd.
- John Robert Cundall, Grade I Gas Fitter, Harrogate District, North Eastern Gas Board.
- James C. Cursiter, Assistant District Engineer, North of Scotland Hydro-Electric Board, Banchory, Deeside.
- James Curtis, Chief Inspector, Metropolitan Police Force.
- Bridget Dalton, Principal Instructor, HM Prison Styal, Home Office.
- Julia Lily Davenport, Controlling Supervisor of Cleaners, Foreign Office.
- William Ross Davies, Departmental Head, Packing and Shipping Division, Max Factor & Co.
- Robert Davis, Chief Works Inspector, Crewe, British Railways Board.
- Robert Daykin, Quality Control Inspector, Darchem Engineering Ltd., Stillington, Co. Durham.
- Arthur James Deacon, Voluntary Youth Leader, St. Michaels Boys Youth Clubs, Northampton.
- Sidney Charles Dell, Head of Pre-Production Department, R. B. Pulling & Co. Ltd., Brentford.
- Walter Henry Deverson, Chief Inspector, Metropolitan Special Constabulary.
- Albert Henry Dingley, Non-Technical Grade III, Atomic Weapons Research Establishment, Foulness, United Kingdom Atomic Energy Authority.
- Gertrude Dinsdale, Honorary Collector, Street Savings Group, Tenby.
- John Marcus Moore Douglas, Head Constable, Royal Ulster Constabulary, Belfast.
- Stanley Duncan, Foreman, Yarrow & Co. Ltd., Glasgow.
- Thomas Eaton, Turbine House Foreman, Kearsley Power Station, North Western Region, Central Electricity Generating Board.
- William Kydd Eaton, Leading Storekeeper, Ministry of Defence (Royal Navy).
- Alexander Joseph Ellul, lately Kavass, HM Consulate-General, Istanbul.
- John Summerfield Evans, Foreman, Severn River Board.
- Gwendoline Ewbank, Centre Organiser, Windermere, Women's Voluntary Service.
- Thomas William Fairbairn, Foreman, Newcastle East District, Tyne Area, North Eastern Electricity Board.
- James Farrell, Works Technical Grade II (M. & E.E.), Ministry of Public Building & Works.
- Robert William John Farrow, Recorder of Work, Ministry of Defence (Royal Navy).
- Stanley John Ferrand, Chief Supervisor (M), Telephone Exchange, Plymouth, General Post Office.
- Gladys Betty Joan Flowers, Member of Women's Voluntary Service (Old Peoples Welfare), North Middlesex.
- Edgar Robert Frarey, Instructor Grade III, 8th Signal Regiment, Catterick, Ministry of Defence (Army).
- John Walker Galloway, lately Foreman Blacksmith, Dickson & Mann Ltd., Armadale.
- Doris Phoebe Garner, Supervisor (F), Head Post Office, Wisbech.
- Eddie Sidney Gewitzke, Senior Checker, Bricklayers Arms Goods Depot, British Railways Board.
- Frederick Percy William Giles, Chief Petty Officer Instructor, Streatham Unit, Sea Cadet Corps.
- Sybil Gillespie, Centre Organiser, Bude, Women's Voluntary Service.
- Allan Goodlet, Timber Yard Inspector, Clyde Navigation Trust.
- William Ewart Grant, Senior Scientific Assistant, Royal Armament Research & Development Establishment, Ministry of Defence (Army).
- William Sweetlove Greenaway, Chargehand, R.E.M.E. Workshops, Lisburn, Ministry of Defence (Army).
- Phyllis Beryl Griffin, Centre Organiser, Andover, Women's Voluntary Service.
- Robert Harper, Foreman Boilermaker, Harland & Wolff Ltd.
- Reginald William Harrison, Warrant Officer, No. 40F (Maidstone) Squadron, Air Training Corps.
- Walter Harrison, Foreman Rigger, British Ropes Ltd., Doncaster.
- James Harwood, MM, Chief Paperkeeper, Home Office.
- John Hay, Boatswain, MV Duke of Athens, General Service Contracts.
- Gladys Mary Hazelrigg, Member, of County Staff (Children's Welfare), Shropshire, Women's Voluntary Service.
- Jeffrey John Heley, Branch D.II Officer, HM Embassy, Peking.
- Michael Morris Henderson, Employee, Spennymoor Factory, Remploy Ltd.
- Alice Mary Hensby, Honorary Street Savings Group Collector, Bedford Park, London.
- Walter Harry Heydon, Auxiliary Postman, Withington Sub-Post Office, Cheltenham.
- Edith Mary Hill, Commandant, Detachment 2 Soke & City of Peterborough Branch, British Red Cross Society.
- Sydney Thomas Hills, Staff Coxswain, Royal National Lifeboat Institution.
- Amos Holdcroft, Overman, Chatterley-Whitfield Colliery, No. 1 (North Staffordshire) Area, West Midlands Division, National Coal Board.
- John Holgate, Civil Defence Training Officer, York.
- John Herbert Hollies, Inspector (Postal), Head Post Office, Dudley.
- Lucy Capron Hollist, Commandant, Sussex 18, Sussex Branch, British Red Cross Society.
- John Charles Hopwood, Warrant Officer, No. 1995 (Poplar) Squadron, Air Training Corps.
- George Alfred Richard Hotchkiss, Overseer, Head Post Office, Oswestry.
- Frank Forrester Howard, Senior Foreman, Stewarts & Lloyds, Ltd., Corby.
- John Frederick Robert Hudson, Works Technical Grade II, Ministry of Public Building & Works.
- Charles William Huggins, Overseer Grade III (Binding), HM Stationery Office.
- Arthur John Hughes, Superintendent of Stores, No. 35 Maintenance Unit, RAF Heywood, Ministry of Defence (Royal Air Force).
- James Hulme, Technical Grade II, Reactor Materials Laboratory, Culcheth, United Kingdom Atomic Energy Authority.
- Herbert George Hursey, Chargehand, Special Craftsman, Royal Aircraft Establishment, Ministry of Aviation.
- Abu Hassan bin Haji Ibrahim, Inspector, Royal Air Force Police (Auxiliary) Service, Singapore, Ministry of Defence (Royal Air Force).
- George Irvine, Farms Foreman, Co-Partnership Farms, Ltd., Boreham.
- Evan John James, Smithing, Welding and Farriery Instructor, Rural Industries Bureau.
- John Russell Jeffries, Substation Attendant, South Wales Electricity Board.
- George Wallett Jenkinson, Sub-Officer, Lincolnshire (Holland) Fire Brigade.
- William Clague Kaighin, Head Foreman Caulker, Cammell Laird & Co. Ltd., Shipbuilders & Engineers Ltd., Birkenhead.
- Edward Arthur Kellington, Sub-Officer, Nottinghamshire Fire Brigade.
- Cecil Harry Kiddle, Sector Warden, Civil Defence Corps, Norfolk.
- Frank Frederick King, Technical Officer, Engineering Department, General Post Office.
- Charles Kirk, Hospital Porter, Pontefract General Infirmary.
- Charles Norman Kirk, Engineer Technical Grade II, Ministry of Defence (Army).
- Robert Laird, Test House Superintendent, Martin Black & Co. (Wire Ropes) Ltd., Coatbridge.
- James Alexander Lamb, Technical Officer, Dundee Telephone Area, General Post Office.
- Mabel Alice Larkin, Group Officer, Lancashire Fire Brigade.
- William George Law, Leading Chargehand, Ministry of Defence (Royal Navy).
- Sydney Lister, Chief Observer, No. 18 Group, Royal Observer Corps.
- James Smith Loudon, Instructional Officer Grade III, Ministry of Labour.
- John McFarland, Special Constable, Ulster Special Constabulary, Armagh.
- Jean McIlroy, Collector, Street Savings Group, Belfast.
- James McKay, Inspector Fitter, Hillington Factory, Remploy Ltd.
- Agnes Mabel Murray MacKinlay, Voluntary Social Worker at Glasgow Royal Infirmary.
- Vera Mallinson, Chief Supervisor, Trunk Exchange, Reading, General Post Office.
- Peter Martin, Main Pump Attendant, Seaham Colliery, Northumberland and Durham Division, National Coal Board.
- Gerald Edgar Medcalf, Chargehand, Fighting Vehicles Research and Development Establishment, Ministry of Defence (Army).
- James Miller, Overman, Roslin Colliery, Lothians Area, Scottish Division, National Coal Board.
- John Gerald Merriman Miller, Chief Observer, Post 8/R3, Royal Observer Corps.
- Cyril Evan Molyneux, JP, Postman, Preston, General Post Office.
- James Tuft Monroe, lately Lighting Superintendent, Belfast Corporation Gas Works.
- Stanley Howard Moore, Telephone Operator Charge-hand, RAF Northwood, Ministry of Defence (Royal Air Force).
- Charles Francis Mullender, Technical Officer, London Telecommunications Region, General Post Office.
- Josiah Murray, Technical Assistant, Grade IV, Ministry of Agriculture for Northern Ireland.
- Evelyn Musgrave, Honorary Collector, Street Savings Group, Bradford.
- Robert John Oakes, Chargehand Metal Machinist Grade I, Doncaster Locomotive and Carriage & Wagon Works, British Railways Board.
- Gerald O'Grady, Assistant Administrative Instructor, 1st (Cadet) Battalion, Royal Inniskilling Fusiliers.
- Herbert William Parker, Foreman Fitter, Robert Jones and Agnes Hunt Orthopaedic Hospital, Oswestry.
- Thomas Ernest Parrott, Senior Shipkeeper, HMS President, Ministry of Defence (Royal Navy).
- Leonard Hugh Parry, Area Supervisor, Anzac Agency, Commonwealth War Graves Commission, Victoria, Australia.
- Thomas Payne, Technical Class Grade II, Ministry of Defence (Royal Navy).
- Thomas Joseph Perkins, Overseer, Head Post Office, Hounslow, Middlesex.
- Harry Petty, Telephonist, Leeds Installation, North Eastern Division, Shell-Mex & B.P. Group.
- Samuel Richard Price, Furnace Building Superintendent, Firth Brown Ltd.
- Dennis Wyndham Puddle, Haulage Driver, Garn Drift (Blaenavon Mine) No. 6 (Monmouthshire) Area, South Western Division, National Coal Board.
- Alfred James Punter, Senior Instructor (Diesel), Staff Training School, Ilford, British Railways Board.
- Leslie Jack Ralls, Model Shop Foreman, Sperry Gyroscope Co. Ltd.
- Jaffa Hasson Abdul Rehman, Clerk Grade I, No. 114 Maintenance Unit, RAF Steamer Point, Aden, Ministry of Defence (Royal Air Force).
- John Henry Robinson, Travelling Chief Inspector (Postal), Home Counties Region, General Post Office.
- George Edward William Rowe, Skilled Labourer, Ministry of Public Building and Works.
- Harold Glyn Sangwin, Foreman Inspector, Yorkshire Imperial Metals Ltd.
- George Herbert Scott, Station Officer, South-Eastern Area Fire Brigade, West Lothian.
- George William James Sharp, Draughtsman, Telephone Managers Office, Reading, General Post Office.
- William Joseph Simpson, Station Officer, Auxiliary Fire Service, Manchester.
- Charles Smith, Honorary Assistant Commandant, Larbert (British Railways) Section, St. Andrews Ambulance Corps.
- Frederick Samuel Smith, Greaser, Cleaner, SS Windsor Castle, British & Commonwealth Shipping Co. Ltd.
- George Smith, Chief Inspector, Air Force Department Constabulary, Ministry of Defence (Royal Air Force).
- Thomas Steel, Mill Foreman, Carrs Flour Mills, Ltd., Carlisle.
- Wilfred Stephens, Higher Grade Surveyor, Ordnance Survey, Ministry of Agriculture, Fisheries & Food.
- Clifford John Stidard, Chargehand and Assistant Foreman, British Aircraft Corporation (Operating) Limited, Guided Weapons Division.
- James Sullivan, Leading Fireman, Glasgow Fire Brigade.
- Winifred Lucy Tallentire, Member of County Staff (Food), East Riding of Yorkshire, Women's Voluntary Service.
- Harry Taylor, Officer-in-Charge, Supply and Transport Store, Pencoed, Home Office.
- William Simpson Teasdale, Chargehand, Hawker Blackburn Division, Hawker Siddeley Aviation Ltd.
- Oswald Vivian Thomas, Senior Civilian Instructor, Metropolitan Police Driving School.
- William Thomas, Boatswain SS Perseus, Alfred Holt & Co.
- Reuben Thompson, Coaling Plant Foreman, Peterborough Power Station, North Thames Division, South Eastern Region, Central Electricity Generating Board.
- Arthur Troop, Sergeant, Lincolnshire Constabulary.
- Doris Emma Very, Honorary Collector, Street Savings Group, Sheerness.
- Alice Elizabeth Walker, Honorary Collector, Street Savings Group, Wilmslow, Cheshire.
- Ellis Walsh, Motor Driver, Sheffield Branch, South Yorkshire and Lincoln District, British Road Services Ltd., Transport Holding Company.
- John Henry Walters, Inspector, North Western Road Car Company Ltd.
- George William Walton, Chief Gallery Warder, British Museum.
- Leslie Cyril Ware, Production Supervisor, Mullard Radio Valve Co.
- Archibald Thomas Weeks, Office Keeper, Grade II, Office of the Parliamentary Counsel, HM Treasury.
- Richard Welch, Watcher, Board of Customs and Excise.
- Sidney Wheldale, Stores Supervisor, Grade II, Central Ordnance Depot, Bicester, Ministry of Defence (Army).
- Albina Whittington, Sub-Postmistress, Sub-Post Office, Methley.
- John Whyte, Chief Steward, MV Heriot, George Gibson & Co. Ltd.
- Irene Margaret Wood, Senior Signals Officer, Civil Defence Corps, Caernarvonshire.
- Sidney Charles Harry Wright, TD, Leading Man of Works, Ministry of Public Building & Works.

Overseas Territories

- Moapare Mosiiwa, Sub-Chief and African Authority, Northern Kgalagadi, Bechuanaland.
- John Edmund Putnam King, Superintendent of Reafforestation, Department of Agriculture & Fisheries, Bermuda.
- Simeon Doorga Singh, County Public Health Inspector, British Guiana.
- Edward Ernest Michael Bull, Senior Mechanic, Posts & Telegraphs Department, Fiji.
- Cuthbert William Southey, Road Supervisor, Public Works Department, Fiji.
- John Michael Nunez, Head Dispenser, Medical Department, Gibraltar.
- Fung So, Foreman Class I, Civil Aviation Department, Hong Kong.
- Yuen Chiu-kwong, Office Attendant, Labour Department, Hong Kong.
- Qhakaza Ntshalintshali, Liaison Officer (Ndabazabantu), Swaziland.
- Martin Maeheta, Chief Boatswain, Marine Department, British Solomon Islands Protectorate, Western Pacific.
- Nei Mereta Auatabu, Medical Department, Gilbert and Ellice Islands Colony, Western Pacific.

State of Victoria

- Alfred George Simmons Hindle, Clerk, Purchasing Branch, State Electricity Commission.
- Leslie Thomas Banner, Ministerial Chauffeur.

State of Western Australia

- Beatrice Ada Mouritz. For services to charity and community welfare movements.
- Thomas Charles Carlisle. For services to the Volunteer Fire Brigades in Western Australia.

Southern Rhodesia

- Leonard James Genet, Police Field Reservist, British South Africa Police.
- Alfred Mafe King, Overseer, Ministry of Roads & Road Traffic.

==== Bar to the British Empire Medal ====
Military Division

- 568732 Flight Sergeant Arthur Richard Hall, BEM, Royal Air Force.

=== Royal Victorian Medal (RVM) ===
In Gold

- Stanley Edgar Hooks.

In Silver

- Percy Benham.
- Robert Urquhart Brown.
- Frederick Henry Collings.
- Divisional Sergeant Major Arthur Frederick Hall, MBE, Her Majesty's Bodyguard of Yeomen of the Guard.
- Isabella Jane Keith.
- Stanley Archibald Paice.
- Arthur Vivian Preece.
- Police Constable Frederick Benjamin Raft, Metropolitan Police.
- Petty Officer Stores Accountant William James Anthony Salmon, P/MX 59632.
- Edward John Charles Smith.
- Frederick Frank Sutton.
- Walter Frederick Taylor.

Honorary

- Monsieur Pierre Capacci.

=== Queen's Police Medal (QPM) ===
England and Wales

- Frederick Peter Collison Garland, Chief Constable, Norfolk Constabulary.
- Robert Mark, Chief Constable, Leicester City Police.
- Francis Gerard Hulme, Chief Constable, Derby Borough Police.
- Richard Bonnar Matthews, Chief Constable, Warwickshire Constabulary.
- Herbert David James Smith, Assistant Chief Constable and Deputy Chief Constable, Gloucestershire Constabulary.
- Eric Cunningham, District Co-ordinator, No. 1 District Regional Crime Squad.
- Colin Gaskell, Deputy Director of the Senior Staff Course, Police College.
- Frederick Henry Banfield, Chief Superintendent, Metropolitan Police.
- William George Vernon Friend, Commandant, No. 8 District Police Training Centre, Bridgend (seconded from Glamorgan Constabulary).
- Anthony Graham, Superintendent, Deputy Chief Constable, Tynemouth Borough Police.
- Edwin James Oakervee, Superintendent, Metropolitan Police.
- William George Duncan, Superintendent, Metropolitan Police.

Scotland

- James Kiltie Scott, Superintendent, Deputy Chief Constable, Kilmarnock Burgh Police.
- James Morris Kelman, Superintendent, Ayrshire Constabulary.

Northern Ireland

- Thomas Frederick Murphy, Head Constable, Royal Ulster Constabulary.

State of New South Wales

- Allan Glenville Wild, Superintendent 2nd Class, New South Wales Police Force.
- Roy Badderly Elliot, Superintendent 2nd Class, New South Wales Police Force.
- James Ferguson, Superintendent 2nd Class, New South Wales Police Force.
- Samuel Joseph Cleary, Superintendent 2nd Class, New South Wales Police Force.
- John Tarbert, Superintendent 3rd Class, New South Wales Police Force.
- William Charles Jack Springthorpe, Superintendent 3rd Class, New South Wales Police Force.

State of South Australia

- Edwin Lindsay Calder, BEM, Inspector, South Australia Police Force.
- Maurice Henry Eaton, Inspector, South Australia Police Force.

Southern Rhodesia

- Robert John Vivian Bailey, Senior Assistant Commissioner, British South Africa Police.

Overseas Territories

- William James Hillier, Assistant Commissioner of Police, Aden.

=== Queen's Fire Services Medal (QFSM) ===
England and Wales

- Arthur James Milbery, Divisional Officer, London Fire Brigade.
- Robert William Austin Newbury, Divisional Officer, Glamorgan Fire Brigade.
- Joseph Gerard Ryan, Assistant Chief Officer, Lancashire Fire Brigade.
- Leonard Alfred Wood, OBE, Chief Officer, Bournemouth Fire Brigade.

Scotland

- Harry Roy Mackay, OBE, Firemaster, South Western Area Fire Brigade.

State of South Australia

- William John Farthing, Deputy Chief Officer, South Australia Fire Brigade.
- Rowland Charles Loader, Auxiliary Foreman, South Australia Fire Brigade.

Overseas Territories

- Anthony Stephen Henderson, District Fire Officer, Hong Kong.
- Alfred Evelyn Harry Wood, District Fire Officer, Hong Kong.

=== Colonial Police Medal (CPM) ===
Rhodesia

- Jack Berry, Superintendent, British South Africa Police.
- John William George Cannon, DFC, Superintendent, British South Africa Police.
- Jack Denley, Superintendent, British South Africa Police.
- Harry Bertram Tahuwona Mageza, Station Sergeant, British South Africa Police.
- Majongosi, No. 10742, Station Sergeant, British South Africa Police.
- Phillip Thomas Owen, Chief Superintendent, British South Africa Police.
- Gibson Tapfuma Vazhure, Detective Station Sergeant, British South Africa Police.

Overseas Territories

- William Algernon Argyle, Deputy Superintendent, British Guiana Police Force.
- Albert Sidney Banks, Senior Superintendent, Hong Kong Police Force.
- Chung Hon, Staff Sergeant, Class II, Hong Kong Police Force.
- Pierre Fernand Regis Comarmond, Inspector, Mauritius Police Force.
- Eustan Commisiong, Member of the Auxiliary Police Force, St Vincent.
- John Thomas Crawley, Superintendent, Bahamas Police Force.
- Christopher John Rowland Dawson, Chief Superintendent, Hong Kong Police Force.
- Joseph Luc Duverge, Pay and Quarter Master, Mauritius Police Force.
- Sereamokolong Garefarolwe, Sub-Inspector, Bechuanaland Protectorate Police Force.
- Hung Hing, Principal Fireman, Fire Services, Hong Kong.
- Seiyid Mohamed Ali Ismail, Deputy Superintendent, Aden Police Force.
- Alan James Jones, Divisional Officer, Fire Services, Hong Kong.
- Awadh Salim Maisari, Chief Inspector, Aden Police Force.
- George Maynard, Detective Inspector, British Guiana Police Force.
- Dennis John Morgan, Director of Music (Deputy Superintendent of Police), Bahamas.
- Ng Wah-sin, Sergeant, Hong Kong Police Force.
- John William Olivier, Superintendent, Swaziland Police Force.
- Richard Arthur Joseph Richardson, Superintendent, Hong Kong Police Force.
- Karlum Shum, Superintendent, Hong Kong Auxiliary Police Force.
- Brian Francis Slevin, Chief Superintendent, Hong Kong Police Force.
- Leslie Waddell, Detective Sergeant, Bermuda Police Force.
- Russell White, Senior Superintendent, Hong Kong Police Force.
- George Ernest Woodman, Deputy Superintendent, Bechuanaland Protectorate Police Force.
- Yau Lo, Principal Fireman, Fire Services, Hong Kong.
- Eugene George Yourieff, Assistant Superintendent, Hong Kong Auxiliary Police Force.

=== Royal Red Cross (RRC) ===
- Lieutenant-Colonel Vera Kathleen Turner (209294), Queen Alexandra's Royal Army Nursing Corps.

==== Associate of the Royal Red Cross (ARRC) ====
Royal Navy

- Alice Mary Gadd, Matron, Queen Alexandra's Royal Naval Nursing Service.
- Patricia Margaret Wilks, Superintending Sister, Queen Alexandra's Royal Naval Nursing Service.

Army

- Major Williamina Polson (215904), Queen Alexandra's Royal Army Nursing Corps.
- Major Mildred Elizabeth Wainwright (215236), Queen Alexandra's Royal Army Nursing Corps.
- Major Joan Margaret Waters (402075), Queen Alexandra's Royal Army Nursing Corps.

Royal Air Force

- Squadron Officer Mary Irene Savage (405919), Princess Mary's Royal Air Force Nursing Service.
- Squadron Officer Catherine Jean Riddell Singer (406732), Princess Mary's Royal Air Force Nursing Service.

=== Air Force Cross (AFC) ===
- Wing Commander John Fraser (1821637).
- Squadron Leader George Thomson Cannon (3124043).
- Squadron Leader John Robert Jackson(4034407).
- Flight Lieutenant John Stephen Sowdan Hay (57090).
- Flight Lieutenant Laurence John Wittin-Hayden, DFC (56337).
- Flight Lieutenant William Edward Hobby (4041415).
- Flight Lieutenant John Robert Huntington, DFM (1685829).
- Flight Lieutenant Terence Ernest Leonard Lloyd (3519222).
- Flight Lieutenant Victor Douglas Woods (199609).
- Master Pilot Stanley Thomas Bousher (1454521).

==== Bar to Air Force Cross ====
- Squadron Leader Jack Norton Henderson, AFC (4042817).

=== Air Force Medal (AFM) ===
- 4149473 Sergeant Ronald William Haddow.

=== Queen's Commendation for Valuable Service in the Air ===
Royal Air Force

- Wing Commander David Brownrigg Craig (2600048).
- Wing Commander Norman Frank Curtis, OBE (53115).
- Squadron Leader Herbert Henry Jones Browning (607135).
- Squadron Leader William Francis Page (2538877).
- Squadron Leader Hector Desmond Seymour (579979).
- Squadron Leader Royston Watson (582051).
- Flight Lieutenant George Leonard Aylett (607605).
- Flight Lieutenant Roger David Britton (504608).
- Flight Lieutenant Glyndwr Charles Chapman (2504353).
- Flight Lieutenant Laurence Frederick Charleton (1861984).
- Flight Lieutenant Raymond Arthur Dodkin (4156572).
- Flight Lieutenant Ian George Douglas (1868548).
- Flight Lieutenant Jack Firth, DFC (179371).
- Flight Lieutenant John Lawton Harrison (607294).
- Flight Lieutenant George Johnston (1566510).
- Flight Lieutenant Ernest Edmund Jones (3517316).
- Flight Lieutenant Bruce Anthony Donald McKenzie McDonald (4036925).
- Flight Lieutenant Richard Albert Miller (5037273).
- Flight Lieutenant Norman William Wilson Pryde (187756).
- Flight Lieutenant Gordon William Smith, MBE (161059).
- Flight Lieutenant Maxwell Nicholas Sparks, AFC (59631).
- Flight Lieutenant William Ian Charles Stoker (607678).
- Flight Lieutenant Alan Gilbert Topham (5037759).
- Flight Lieutenant Edwin George Waddingham (1805533).
- Master Pilot William Thomas Jackson, AFM (1321034).
- Master Pilot Edward James Treeves, AFM (1323638).
- Master Navigator James Carroll (1551033).
- Master Signaller William Edmund Lowther, AFM (2209306).
- 1931884 Corporal David Welsh.

United Kingdom

- Shirley Patricia Jenkins, Assistant Experimental Officer, Royal Aircraft Establishment, Farnborough.
- Captain Donal Francis O'Sullivan, Senior Captain, British Overseas Airways Corporation.
- Captain Thomas Roy Pigden, Senior Training Captain, Argosy Flight, British European Airways Corporation.

== Australia ==
=== Knight Bachelor ===
- William Hewson Anderson, CBE, JP, of East Malvern, Victoria. For public services.
- Henry Armand Bland, CBE, Secretary, Department of Labour and National Service, Victoria.
- George Stanley Colman, CBE, of South Yarra, Victoria. For services to commerce and industry.
- Arnold Hughes Ennor, CBE, Professor of Biochemistry, Australian National University, Canberra.
- Edwin William Hicks, CBE, Secretary, Department of Defence, Canberra.

=== Order of the Bath ===
==== Companion of the Order of the Bath (CB) ====
Military Division

- Major-General Thomas Joseph Daly, CBE, DSO (45), Australian Staff Corps.

=== Order of Saint Michael and Saint George ===
==== Companion of the Order of St Michael and St George (CMG) ====
- Leslie Atkinson, OBE, of Earlwood, New South Wales. For services to Australian commerce.
- Elias Godfrey Coppel, QC, of Glen Iris, Victoria. For services to the Law.
- Thomas Meek Ramsay, of Toorak, Victoria. For services to the Australian manufacturing industry.

=== Order of the British Empire ===
==== Knight Commander of the Order of the British Empire (KBE) ====
Civil Division

- Professor John Philip Baxter, CMG, OBE, Chairman, Australian Atomic Energy Commission.
- His Excellency the Honourable Alexander Russell Downer, High Commissioner for the Commonwealth of Australia in London.
- William John Kilpatrick, CBE, of Toorak, Victoria. For public services.

==== Commander of the Order of the British Empire (CBE) ====
Military Division

Royal Australian Navy

- Captain John Hastie Dowson.

Australian Army

- Brigadier George Percy Hunt, OBE (398), Australian Staff Corps.

Royal Australian Air Force

- Air Commodore William Edwin Townsend, OBE.

Civil Division

- Howard Ernest Dann, Associate Commissioner, Snowy Mountains Hydro-electric Authority.
- William Cotter Burnell Harvey, MB, ChM, of Bellevue Hill, New South Wales. For services to Medicine.
- John Keith McCarthy, MBE, Director of District Administration, Territory of Papua and New Guinea.
- Alfred Clement Borthwick Maiden, Secretary, Department of Primary Industry, Canberra.
- Clive Ogilvy, of Mosman, New South Wales. For public services, particularly to broadcasting.
- Richard Robert Law-Smith, AFC, Vice-Chairman, Qantas Empire Airways.
- James Edward Taylor, Senior Commissioner, Commonwealth Conciliation & Arbitration Commission, Victoria.
- Arthur Cleveland Wigan, Deputy Chairman, Board of Business Administration, Department of Defence, Victoria.
- James Robert Willoughby, OBE, Federal Director of the Liberal Party of Australia.

==== Officer of the Order of the British Empire (OBE) ====
Military Division

Royal Australian Navy

- Lieutenant Commander (Acting Commander) David Nicholls.

Australian Army

- Colonel Peter Kaye, MB, BS (350211), Royal Australian Army Medical Corps.
- Colonel John Frank McLean (337579), Royal Australian Army Ordnance Corps.
- Lieutenant-Colonel Alan Bishop Stretton, MBE (3324), Australian Staff Corps.

Royal Australian Air Force

- Group Captain Alexander Thomas Fay, MBE.
- Acting Group Captain Wilbur Herbert Sergeant Talberg.

Civil Division

- Keith McRae Archer, Commonwealth Statistician, Canberra.
- Donald Gordon Barwick, of Tamworth West, New South Wales. For his services to primary industry.
- Archie Garner Brown, of Essendon North, Victoria. For his services to the aircraft industry.
- John Patrick Buckley, First Assistant Secretary, Inspection and Design Division, Department of Defence, Victoria.
- Gerard D'Arcy Chislett, Secretary, Graziers Federal Council and Australian Woolgrowers Council.
- Charles Kennedy Comans, Principal Assistant Parliamentary Draftsman, Canberra.
- Philip Halford Cook, Assistant Secretary (Employment), Department of Labour and National Service, Victoria.
- The Reverend Father Thomas Vincent Dunlea, of Hurstville, New South Wales. For services in the field of social welfare.
- Henry James Evans, of North Brighton, Victoria. For his contribution to Australian industry.
- Ernest David Gardiner, of Williamstown, Victoria. For his services to the advancement of science teaching.
- Joseph Robert Archibald Glenn, of Toorak, Victoria. For his services to industry.
- Arthur Lawrence Hall, Assistant Secretary, (Establishments) Secretariat, Department of Air, Canberra.
- Travis Henry John Harrison, Director, Plant Quarantine Division, Commonwealth Department of Health, Canberra.
- Stanley Scott Ick-Hewins, of Pymble, New South Wales. For his services to the Australian grazing industry.
- George Ernest Kitchin-Kerr, Secretary, Australian Citrus Growers' Federation.
- William Richards Lawson, Collector of Customs, Department of Customs and Excise, Western Australia.
- Ian McDonald, JP, Chairman, Papua and New Guinea Copra Marketing Board.
- James Joseph McGrath, Director, Australian War Memorial, Canberra.
- David MacKay, lately Secretary of the Australian Coastal Shipping Commission.
- Peter Malloch, MBE, of Mildura, Victoria. For his services to the Australian dried fruits industry.
- Thomas Stuart Philpott, First Assistant Secretary (Establishments and General), Department of the Navy, Canberra.

==== Member of the Order of the British Empire (MBE) ====
Military Division

Royal Australian Navy

- Surgeon Lieutenant Bernard Charles Firth, MB, BS

Australian Army

- Major (Quartermaster) Alan Henry Moorhouse Bohle (2191), Royal Australian Infantry Corps.
- Major William Brian Fegan (1355), Royal Australian Corps of Signals.
- 33953 Warrant Officer Class I Reginald Douglas Marsden, Royal Australian Army Service Corps.
- 2920 Warrant Officer Class I Walter Mills, Royal Australian Infantry Corps.
- 1314 Warrant Officer Class I Thomas Lloyd Muggleton, Royal Australian Infantry Corps.
- Captain Noel Dudley Prime (437312), Royal Australian Engineers.
- Major Douglas Harold Yeats (17544), Australian Staff Corps.

Royal Australian Air Force

- Squadron Leader Thomas Butler (033148),
- Warrant Officer Norman Arthur Hugo (A31337).
- Warrant Officer Geoffrey Roger Joseph Keary (A3919).
- Warrant Officer Colin Ellis Tickner (A2284).

Civil Division

- Arthur Edward Bingham. For services to disabled ex-servicemen, particularly as President of the Maimed and Limbless Ex-Servicemen's Association of Western Australia.
- Leonard David Percival Blessington, of Girral, New South Wales. For services to the welfare of blinded ex-servicemen.
- Dorothy Bruce, Matron, Repatriation General Hospital, Springbank, South Australia.
- Kenneth Rutherford Bunn, of Bondi, New South Wales. For services to the blind.
- Elizabeth Robson Calvert, of Canberra. For social welfare services, especially in connection with the Red Cross.
- John Maxwell Cameron, Director of Works, Territory of Papua and New Guinea.
- Patrick John Edward Claffey, Registrar of the School of Public Health and Tropical Medicine, Department of Health, Sydney, New South Wales.
- Robert Alan Crook, JP, of Killara, New South Wales. For public services, particularly as founder of the Australian Rostrum.
- Elizabeth Margaret Cunningham, of Orange, New South Wales. For her services to the care of the sick.
- Reginald Cecil Davies, lately Superintending Inspector, Weapons Branch, Department of the Navy, Canberra.
- Alan Robert Docking, Director, Commonwealth Bureau of Dental Standards, Department of Health, Victoria.
- Elsie Jean Easterbrook, of East Kew, Victoria. For services to the R.A.A.F. Women's Association.
- Thomas Kingston Fisher, Administrative Officer, Department of the Army, Canberra.
- Charles Fletcher, JP, of Toongabbie, New South Wales. For services to aviation.
- Agnes Mary Garry, of Binalong, New South Wales. For social welfare services.
- Harry Christian Giese, MLC, Director of Welfare, Department of Territories, Northern Territory.
- Herbert Francis Griffin, Area Finance Officer, Department of Air, Sydney, New South Wales.
- Joan Merritt Haigh. For her services on behalf of immigrants, particularly as Secretary of the Good Neighbour Council of Western Australia.
- George Henry Hallandale, Assistant Director of Works, Victoria and Tasmania.
- Clive Henry Harburg, of Coorparoo, Brisbane, Queensland. For services to ex-servicemen.
- Cleven James Healey, of West Footscray, Victoria. For services to ex-servicemen.
- Michael James Healy, lately District Commissioner, New Ireland District, Territory of Papua and New Guinea.
- Elenor Hempton, of Waverley, New South Wales. For public and social welfare services.
- Beryl Elaine Jacka, Secretary, Australasian Institute of Mining and Metallurgy, Victoria.
- Edwin Thomas John Kerby, of Auburn, Victoria. For services to the welfare of ex-servicemen.
- Captain Arthur Carrington Lovell. For services to civil aviation, particularly as Chief Pilot, Ansett/Australian National Airways.
- Frank Sydney Meddows, JP, of Balgowlah, New South Wales. For services in the field of hospital administration.
- Olive O'Keefe, of Katherine, Northern Territory. For services to nursing.
- Margaret Somerville, of Darwin, Northern Territory. For services to the welfare of part-aboriginal children.
- Sam Wilson Stinson, of Bathurst, New South Wales. For services to local government and the community.
- Eva Margaret Thompson, of Strathfield, New South Wales. For services to subnormal children.
- William Douglas Tredinnick, Deputy Assistant Director-General, Post Offices Branch, Postmaster-General's Department, Victoria.
- John Andrew Tuite, Engineer, Class 4, Postmaster-General's Department, New South Wales.
- Archibald James Vasey, Executive Secretary, Commonwealth Scientific Committee.
- Anne Gorman Watts, JP, of Darra, Brisbane, Queensland. For social welfare services.
- Grace Young (Matron Saunders), of Collaroy, New South Wales. For services to the care of the aged.

=== Companion of the Imperial Service Order (ISO) ===
- James Arthur Collopy, lately Chief Aircraft Surveyor, Airworthiness Branch, Department of Civil Aviation, Victoria.
- Horace Walter Hyett, lately Assistant Director-General, Central Staff, Postmaster-General's Department, Victoria.
- Michael Leo Kelly, Inspector, Conditions and General Division, Public Service Board, Canberra.
- James Douglas MacFarlane, First Assistant Secretary, Inspection and Management Services,. Department of Primary Industry, Canberra.
- William Alfred Eric Nielsen, Assistant Director-General (Telecommunications), Central Staff, Postmaster-General's Department, Victoria.
- Edward O'Grady, Director, Naval and Air Stores, Department of the Navy, Victoria.
- Leslie Thompson, lately Senior Assistant Commissioner of Taxation, Canberra.
- Henry Francis Yoxon, First Assistant Director-General (Management Services), Department of Works, Victoria.

=== British Empire Medal (BEM) ===
Military Division

Royal Australian Navy

- Chief Petty Officer Coxswain Raymond Jamieson, R 48390.
- Chief Airman Keith Francis Kempnich, R 36801.
- Master-at-Arms Charles Joseph Wright, 40133.

Australian Army

- 34393 Warrant Officer II (temporary) Reginald James Collinson, Royal Australian Engineers.
- 212800 Sapper Ivor Bernard Lewis, Royal Australian Engineers.
- 26811 Sergeant Roy Arthur Noud, Royal Australian Army Service Corps.
- 13363 Staff-Sergeant Gordon Robert Robertson, Royal Australian Artillery.
- 14249 Warrant Officer Class II (temporary) Robert Emmet Rooney, Australian Intelligence Corps.
- 34767 Sergeant Noel Edward Tinning, Royal Australian Army Medical Corps.

Royal Australian Air Force

- A25316 Flight Sergeant James Alfred Davison.
- A22570 Sergeant John Neil Bell.
- A13068 Corporal William Earle Wilkinson.

Civil Division

- Millicent Clare Brassel, Postmistress, Bellbrook, New South Wales.
- Rita Kathleen Demas, Overseas (Phonograms), Postmaster-General's Department, New South Wales.
- Edgar Bruce Elliott, Plant Operator, Snowy Hydro-electric Authority, New South Wales.
- George Albert John Fleming, lately Senior Technical Officer, Williamstown Dockyard, Victoria.
- Vida Mitylene Greentree, Postmistress, Freeman's Reach, New South Wales.
- Henry Joseph Lea, lately civilian Oil Fuel Installation Attendant, Department of the Navy, Darwin, Northern Territory.
- Joseph Antonio Maranta, Senior Technical Instructor Grade 2, Postmaster-General's Department, Queensland.
- John McCallum, Senior Foreman (Mechanical Plant), Department of Works, Canberra.
- Irene Elizabeth Mills, Steno-Secretary to the Secretary, Department of Air, Canberra.
- John Sperry Noseda, Clerical Assistant Grade 4, Postmaster-General's Department, Victoria.
- Edward Sylvester Schmutter, Trades Labourer, Snowy Mountains, Hydro-electric Authority, New South Wales.
- Elsie Rose Sullivan, lately Postmistress, Gongolgon, New South Wales.
- Eleanor Mabel Thompson, President, Coffs Harbour Branch of the Australian Red Cross Society.
- Graham George Young, Senior Mail Officer Grade 1, Postmaster-General's Department, Tasmania.

=== Air Force Cross (AFC) ===
Royal Australian Air Force

- Squadron Leader Robert Derik Bray (022191).
- Squadron Leader John Thomas Carter (04430).
- Squadron Leader Raymond Francis Fox, DFC (035498).
- Squadron Leader Roberts Hunter Martin (022188).

=== Queen's Commendation for Valuable Service in the Air ===
Royal Australian Navy

- Lieutenant Anthony Ireson Booth, Royal Navy (on exchange service with the RAN).
- Lieutenant Robert Charles O'Day.
- Sub Lieutenant David Alan Cronin.

Australian Army

- Major Rex Stuart Deacon (17007), Royal Australian Army Service Corps
- Captain John Cameron Ross (235137), Royal Australian Army Service Corps.

Royal Australian Air Force

- Squadron Leader Reginald Heathcote (022050).
- Squadron Leader Donald Couldrey White (013864).
- Squadron Leader John Ronald Young (05357).
- Flight Lieutenant George Melville King (035883).
- Flight Lieutenant John James McKenzie (0216734).
- Flight Lieutenant John Irvine Thomson (032446).

== Sierra Leone ==
=== Knight Bachelor ===
- Samuel Bankole Jones, Chief Justice.

=== Order of the British Empire ===
==== Officer of the Order of the British Empire (OBE) ====
Civil Division

- Christopher Okoro Elnathan Cole, Puisne Judge.
- Madame Ella Koblo Gulama, MBE, Paramount Chief, Kaiyamba Chiefdom. For public services as Minister without Portfolio.

==== Member of the Order of the British Empire (MBE) ====
Civil Division

- Hugh Stanley Godbeer, Industrial Development Officer, Ministry of Trade and Industry.
- The Venerable Archdeacon Michael Keili. For services to the development of education.
- Cyril George White, General Manager, Rice Department, Ministry of Trade and Industry.
- Tamba Richard Yamba. For services to the community in Kono District.

=== British Empire Medal (BEM) ===
Civil Division

- Theophilus James Williams, Survey Superintendent, Surveys and Lands Division, Ministry of Lands, Mines and Labour.

=== Queen's Police Medal (QPM) ===
- John Gidioh Wales, Assistant Commissioner, Sierra Leone Police Force.

== Jamaica ==
=== Order of the British Empire ===
==== Commander of the Order of the British Empire (CBE) ====
Civil Division

- John Kenneth McKenzie Pringle. For public services.

==== Officer of the Order of the British Empire (OBE) ====
Military Division

- Lieutenant-Colonel Frederick Kenrick Neville Mascoll, ED, Assistant Adjutant and Quarter-Master-General, Jamaica Defence Force.

Civil Division

- Allan Isidore Morais, Deputy High Commissioner for Jamaica in London.

==== Member of the Order of the British Empire (MBE) ====
Military Division

- Major Basil Constantine Burke, Jamaica National Reserve.

Civil Division

- Altman Herbert Valentine Cotterell, Clerk of the Courts.
- Harold Noel Walker, Headmaster, Wolmer's Boys School.

=== Companion of the Imperial Service Order (ISO) ===
- Kathleen Beatrice Sharpe, Senior Assistant Commissioner of Income Tax.

=== British Empire Medal (BEM) ===
Military Division

- Corporal Melmoth George Myrie-Guy, Jamaica Defence Force Engineer Unit.

== Trinidad and Tobago ==
=== Knight Bachelor ===
- Werner James Boos, CBE. For public services.

== Malawi ==
=== Order of the British Empire ===
==== Officer of the Order of the British Empire (OBE) ====
Civil Division

- John Alexander Galloway Corrie, MC, Under Secretary, Prime Minister's Office.
- Robert Milne Garrard, Commissioner for Surveys.
- Watkin Edward Lewis, Chief Conservator of Forests and Game.

==== Member of the Order of the British Empire (MBE) ====
Civil Division

- Norman Reginald Bartlett, Senior Establishment Officer, Ministry of Works.
- Garnice Veronica Wessels, Principal Nursing Officer.

=== Queen's Police Medal (QPM) ===
- Alfred Trevor Bevan, Assistant Commissioner, Malawi Police Force.

== Gambia ==
=== Order of the British Empire ===
==== Officer of the Order of the British Empire (OBE) ====
Civil Division

- Momodou Mousa Jallow, Chairman, The Gambia Oilseeds Marketing Board.

==== Member of the Order of the British Empire (MBE) ====
Civil Division

- Ian Cedric Reed Coombe, Development Officer.
- Sister Mary Jarlath, Principal, St Joseph's Secondary School.
- Abdul Khadie Rahman, Technician and Interpreter, Medical Research Council.

=== British Empire Medal (BEM) ===
Civil Division

- Mamour Alieu Secka, Senior Health Inspector.

=== Queen's Police Medal (QPM) ===
- John Patrick Bray, Commissioner, The Gambia Police Force.
