= List of beings referred to as fairies =

The term fairy is peculiar to the English language and to English folklore, reflecting the conflation of Germanic, Celtic and Romance folklore and legend since the Middle English period (it is a Romance word which has been given the associations of fair by folk etymology secondarily). Nevertheless, "fairy" has come to be used as a kind of umbrella term in folklore studies, grouping comparable types of supernatural creatures since at least the 1970s. The following list is a collection of individual traditions which have been grouped under the "fairy" moniker in the citation given.

== Africa ==
- The Aziza are a beneficent fairy race from Africa, specifically Dahomey.
- The Yumboes are supernatural beings in the mythology of the Wolof people (most likely Lebou) of Senegal, West Africa. Their alternatively used name Bakhna Rakhna literally means good people, an interesting parallel to the Scottish fairies called Good Neighbours.

== Asia ==
- Al Ana - goes by several names. Said to be either a witch or Djinn, but derives from older regional folklore. Seems to have a weird amount in common with Elves, even being called Albis and causing a sickness known as Albasti.
- Djinn - Djinn are supernatural beings from Arabic and Islamic tradition, created from smokeless fire. They inhabit a hidden world alongside humanity and possess free will, allowing them to be good, evil, or anything in between. Many are associated with shapeshifting, magic, and other supernatural powers, and include groups such as marids, ifrits, and jann.
- Diwata in Philippine mythology is a gender-neutral umbrella term for fairies and nymphs and even gods, goddesses, nature spirits.
- Xian (仙), in Chinese mythology, are oftentimes referred to as fairies. They are supernatural beings (enlightened humans and other creatures) who are immortal (though they may die, just not of old age) and possess magical abilities.
- The Chinese huli jing and the Japanese kitsune have both been described as "fox fairies".
- Kodama - diminutive tree spirits of Japanese folklore.
- Mogwai are, according to Chinese tradition, a breed of fairy-folk who possess great powers, which they often use to inflict harm on humans.
- The Malaysian pari-pari (Malaysian) or peri (Indonesian) are often seen as motherly creatures who will help those who have good heart. Malay fairies also love fruit and like nature.
- Peris, found in Persian mythology, are descended from spirits who have been denied paradise until they have done penance.
- Tien from Vietnamese folklore are celestial beings variously described in English as "angels", "fairies", "immortals", and "spirits".
- Yaksha are creatures usually characterized as having dual personalities, found in Hindu and Buddhist mythology. On the one hand, a Yaksha may be an inoffensive nature-fairy, associated with woods and mountains; a darker version of the Yaksha, a kind of anthropophagic ogre, ghost, or demon who haunts the wilderness and waylays, and devours travelers.
- Yōkai - Yōkai are a diverse group of supernatural beings from Japanese folklore, including spirits, monsters, shapeshifters, and living legends. They range from mischievous tricksters like kitsune and tanuki to dangerous creatures such as kappa and oni, with motives that can be helpful, harmful, or simply unpredictable.

== European folklore (and European colonies in the New World) ==
- Anguane
- Alberich, an elf king. Later Anglicized to Oberon and used in several works of fiction as king of the fairies.
- Alp also, Alpa, Elba. There is also a Dragon known as the Alber, implying shapeshifting.
- The Aos Sí or sídhe are a powerful supernatural race in Irish mythology.
- Bluecap
- Brag
- Brownie
- Changeling
- Clurichaun
- Dearg Due
- Drak - a German cross between an elf and a lizard. French version known as a Drac.
- Drude
- The duende or chaneque refers to a fairy- or goblin-like mythological character. While its nature varies throughout Spain, Portugal, the Philippines, and Latin America, in many cases its closest equivalents known in the Anglophone world are the Irish leprechaun and the Scottish brownie.
- Dunnie
- Dwarf
- Elves are a supernatural race from Germanic mythology.
- Encantado, in Portuguese, are creatures who come from a paradisaical underwater realm called the Encante. It may refer to spirit beings or shape shifting snakes, or most often to dolphins with the ability to turn into humans.
- The Erlking is a malevolent creature that is said to lure children away from safety and kill them.
- Feldgeister
- Feufollet are a Cajun legend that emerged along the bayou as early as the 1920s with a light (a ball of fire) that shot out into the sky, likely derived from the same natural phenomena as the will o' the wisp. The lights were known as fairies, spirits and sometimes the ghosts of loved ones.
- Fossegrim
- Fuath
- Gancanagh
- Goblin
- Hedley Kow
- Hob
- Hobgoblin
- Hödekin
- Hulder
- Hyter sprites - also Hyty, Hike. Fairy like beings from England which often take the form of birds.
- Iratxo
- Kabouter
- Klabautermann
- Knocker
- Kobalos
- Kobold
- Korrigan
- Krampus
- Laurin- a lesser known other Elf King referred to in Alpine folklore
- Lazavik (Belarus) - one eyed diminutive spirit with a vine whip that lives in thorny thickets and protects swampland.
- Lazy Laurence
- Leprechaun
- Lubber fiend
- Lutin
- Monaciello
- Moss people
- Mowing-Devil
- Nisse
- Nix - also nixie, Neck, necken, nocken.
- Nymphs are female nature spirits from Greek mythology. Satyrs are their male counterparts.
- Pillywiggins are tiny goblins and fairies, guardians of the flora, mentioned in English and Irish folklore.
- Pixie - also Peskie
- Púca
- Puck
- Rå - including skogsrå, sjörå, havsrå and bergsrå
- Redcap
- Saci
- Selkie
- Shellycoat
- Simonside Dwarfs
- Slattenpatte (Danish)
- Slavic fairies come in several forms and their names are spelled differently based on the specific language.
- Sluagh
- Spriggan
- Sprite
- Tiddy Mun
- Tomte
- Trow (folklore)
- Tylwyth Teg or Bendith y Mamau is the traditional name for fairies or fairy-like creatures of the Otherworld in Welsh folklore and mythology.
- Urisk
- Vættir - also Wight
- Weiße Frauen
- The Xana is a character found in Asturian mythology
- Yallery Brown
- Zână (plural Zâne) is the Romanian equivalent of the Greek Charites. These characters help humans in fairy tales and reside mostly in the woods. They may considered the Romanian equivalent of fairies.

== The Americas ==
- An alux is a type of sprite or spirit described by the Maya peoples of the Yucatán Peninsula.
- Caŋ Otila - little people of Lakota lore who live in trees. Consulted in magic.
- Chaneques are small elf- or pixie-like beings in the south to southeast of Mexico, especially Veracruz and parts of Oaxaca. Their name "chaneque" derives from the Nahuatl term ohuican chaneque, meaning "those who dwell in dangerous places", and they seem to have originally been guardian spirits of craggy mountains, woods, springs, caves, etc. Today, they are usually described as having the appearance of a toddler, with the wrinkled face of a very old person. They are known for hiding things, getting people lost, and sometimes throwing stones at people.
- The curupira is a male supernatural being which guards the forest in Tupi mythology.
- Granny Squannit - a Little People chieftainess of Wampanoag lore who is consulted as a patron saint, of sorts.
- Jogah are small spirit-folk from Iroquois mythology.
- Memegwaans- formless little people of the Anishinaabeg who take the forms of other children. Only appear to children who are upset, distressed or in trouble. Used as a patron Saint of lost children, who look after and protect them when kids go missing. Associated with caves.
- Memegwesi- hairy little people of Anishinaabeg lore who live in burrows along rivers, throwing rocks at passersby and capsizing canoes.
- Nikommo - another type of little people of Wampanoag lore associated with forests. Had feasts thrown in their honor. Also called Mikumwess.
- Pukwudgie - type of little people said to be malevolent by the Wampanoag, but neutral by the Anishinaabeg. Associated with swamps.
- Stick Indians- dangerous Little People of the Pacific Northwest, used to warn children away from playing in the wild areas.
- Yaqsuri- mischievous Catawba little people who tie people's clothes and hair into bushes when they aren't looking.

== Australia and Oceania ==
- Menehune (pl./s.)/Menehunes (pl.): Centuries ago, a Hawaiian legend spoke of the Menehune, who were a mischievous group of small people, or dwarfs, who lived hidden in the forests and valleys of the tropical islands. These creatures were only about 2–3 feet tall; some were as small as 6 inches. They enjoyed dancing, singing, archery, and cliff diving, and their favorite foods were bananas and fish. They also, according to local lore, were smart, strong, and excellent craftsmen. The Menehune were said to use magic arrows to pierce the heart of angry people, igniting feelings of love in its place. Menehune were rarely seen by human eyes, and they are credited with mighty feats of engineering and overnight construction.
- Mimi / Mimih (or Mimi/Mimih Spirits) inhabited and traversed the interstitial space between the physical and spiritual world during the Dreamtime and acted as Guardians of our natural world. In artwork, they are often depicted as slender, waif-like, and ethereal white figures. They are so thin that they are in danger of breaking in the wind. They hide in escarpments and rock crevices. They are known for teaching early Indigenous Australians to paint, and how to hunt and cook kangaroo meat; however some have a reputation for mischief and for harmless play and 'pranks' with humans.

== Literary Fiction ==
- Oberon King of the Fairies from William Shakespeare's A Midsummer Night's Dream
- Titania Queen of the Fairies from William Shakespeare's A Midsummer Night's Dream. She has a number of fairy servants: Peaseblossom, Cobweb, Mustardseed, and Mote
- Puck A mischievous fairy from William Shakespeare's A Midsummer Night's Dream
- Queen Mab A fairy mentioned Mercutio in William Shakespeare's in Romeo and Juliet.
