= English folklore =

Myths and legends of English culture

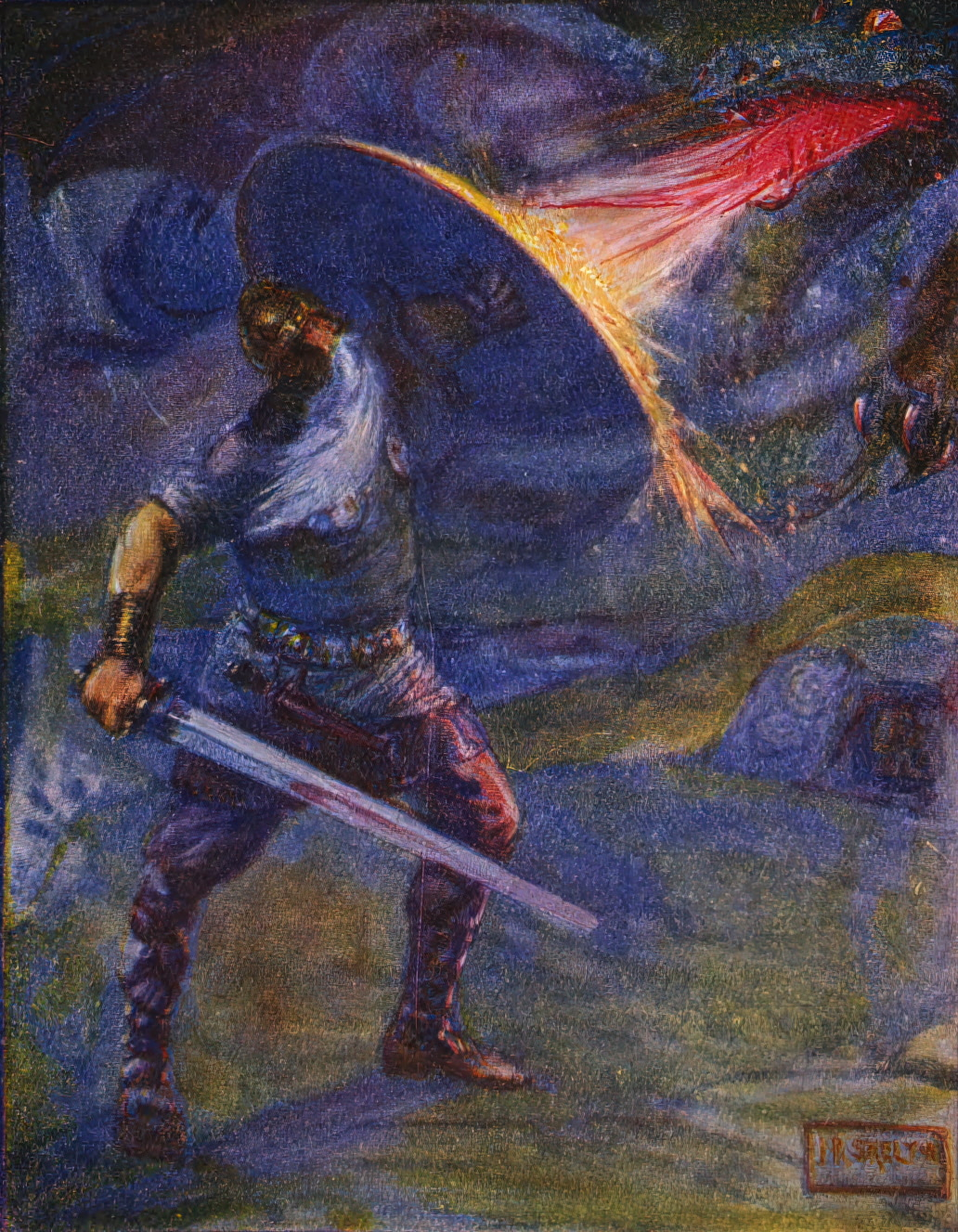
Beowulf and the Dragon, as told in the Old English epic poem Beowulf

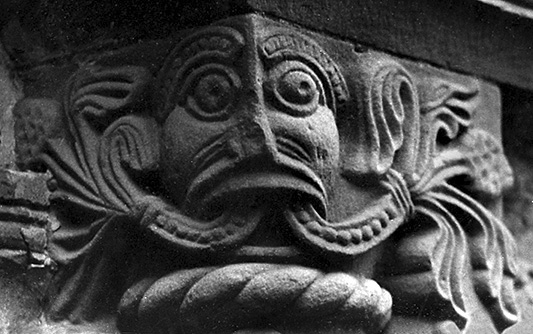
A sculpture of the mythical Green Man on the Church of St Mary and St David, Kilpeck

English folklore consists of the myths and legends of England, including the region's mythical creatures, traditional recipes, urban legends, proverbs, superstitions, dance, balladry, and folktales that have been passed down through generations, reflecting the cultural heritage of the country. This body of folklore includes a diverse array of characters, such as heroic figures like Beowulf or Robin Hood, legendary kings like Arthur, and mythical creatures like the Green Man and Black Shuck. These tales and traditions have been shaped by the historical experiences of the English people, influenced by the various cultures that have settled in England over centuries, including Celtic, Roman, Anglo-Saxon, Norse, and Norman elements.

The stories within English folklore often convey themes of justice, loyalty, bravery, and the supernatural, and often contain a moral imperative stemming from Christian values. They frequently explore the relationship between humans and the natural world, as seen in the legends of the Green Man or Herne the Hunter, or the consequences of human actions, as illustrated in tales like the Lambton Worm.

Additionally, English folklore has been influenced by historical events, such as the witch trials of the early modern period, which are reflected in stories like that of the Pendle witches. During the Renaissance in the 16th century, England looked to more European texts to develop a national identity. English folklore has continued to differ according to region, although there are shared elements across the country. The folktales, characters and creatures are often derived from aspects of English experience, such as topography, architecture, real people, or real events.

English folklore has had a lasting impact on English culture, literature, and identity. Many of these traditional stories have been retold in various forms, from medieval manuscripts to modern films and literature. To this day, traditional folk festivals such as May Day, Plough Monday, Bonfire Night, Allhallowtide, and Harvest festival continue to be practised. Morris dancing, Mummers' plays, and Maypole dancing remain popular forms of folk traditions, often depicting or echoing themes or stories from English folklore.

== History ==
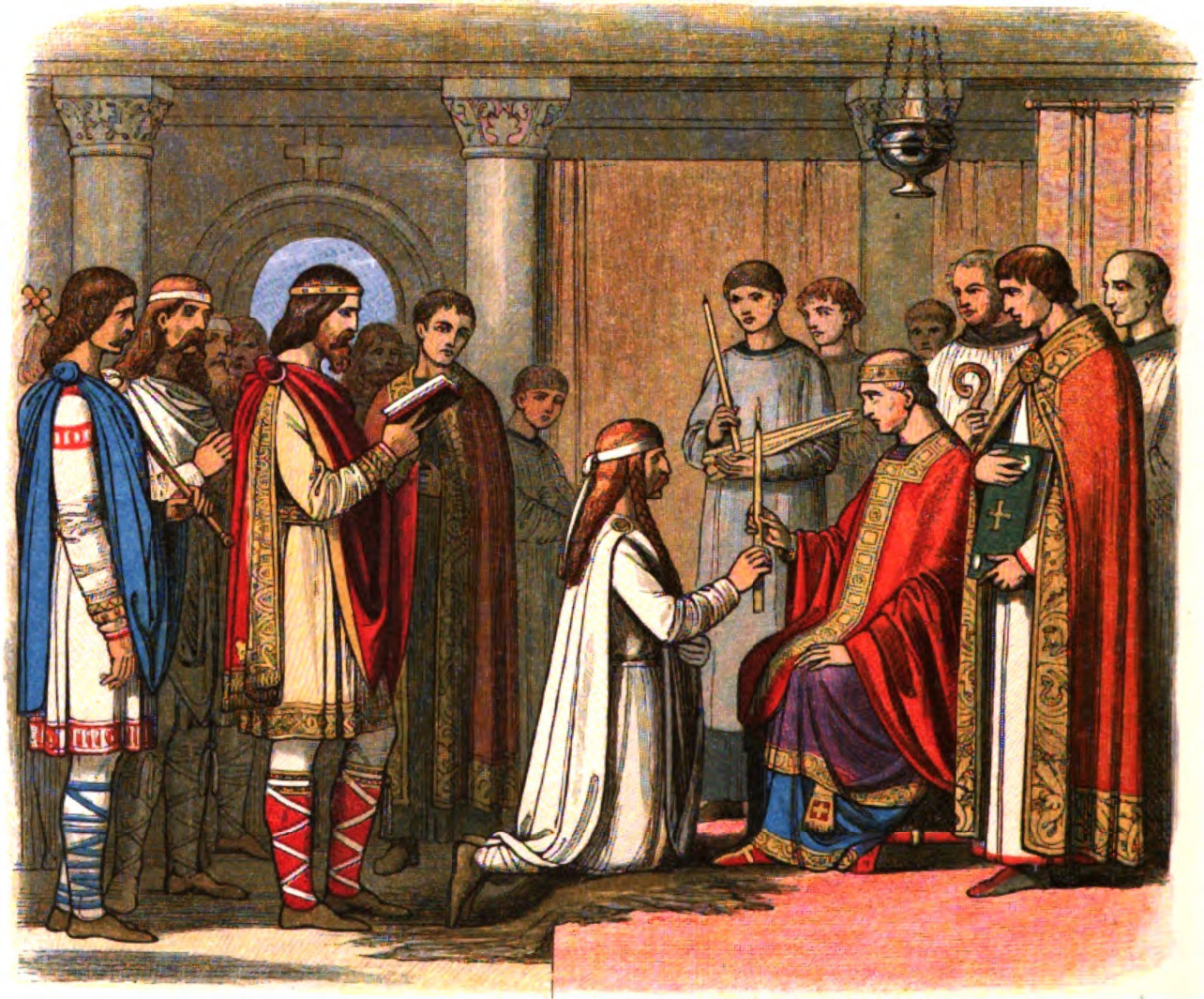
King Guthrum being appointed as a Christian by King Alfred before becoming the ruler of East Anglia

Before England was founded in the year 927, Wessex and its surrounding areas' cultures were transformed by the invasion of the Danish King Guthrum between 865 and 878. The king of Wessex, King Alfred, prevailed against King Guthrum's troops in 878 and King Guthrum was baptised and became the ruler of East Anglia. This continued the process of the assimilation of Norse words into the English language. Eventually English folklore melded with Norse traditions such as in their iconography, which became more Greek, and in their clothing and folktales which adopted more Nordic elements. The folklore of the people of England continued to be passed down through oral tradition.

During the Renaissance, artists captured these customs in the written word, such as Shakespearean plays' reflections of English folklore through their witches, fairies, folk medicine, marriage and funeral customs, superstitions, and religious beliefs.

The Grimm brothers' publications such as German Legends and Grimms' Fairy Tales were translated from their original German and distributed across Europe in 1816. Their stories inspired publishers such as William Thoms to compile legends from within English folklore and without to compose an English identity. The stories that the Grimm brothers collected were integrated into the English school curriculum throughout the 19th century as educators of morality.

== Characteristics ==
Although English folklore has many influences, its largest are Christian, Celtic and Germanic. Non-Christian influences also defined English folklore up to the eleventh century, such as in their folksongs, celebrations and folktales. An example is the 305 ballads collected by Francis James Child published during the English revival in the 19th century. During the English folksong revival, English artists scrambled to compose a national identity consisting of England's past folksongs and their contemporary musical influences. Authors such as Francis James Child, Arthur Hugh Clough, and Chaucer made English folksong supranational due to the willingness to import other languages' words, pronunciations, and metres. Other examples of non-Christian influences include the Wild Hunt which originates from wider Europe, and Herne the Hunter which relates to the Germanic deity Woden. The Abbots Bromley Horn Dance may represent a pre-Christian festival and the practice of Well dressing in the Peak District, which may date back to Anglo-Saxon or even Celtic times. May Day celebrations such as the Maypole survive across much of England and Northern Europe. Christmas practices such as decorating trees, the significance of holly, and Christmas carolling were born from the desire to escape from the harshness of winter around Europe.

These combine to form a folklore which teaches that, through an upright and virtuous character, a person can achieve a successful life. Lullabies, songs, dances, games, folktales, and superstitions all imparted a religious and moral education, and form a person's sense of justice and Christianity. Children's games would often contain counting songs or gamifications of manners to ensure that a child was happy, healthy, and good.

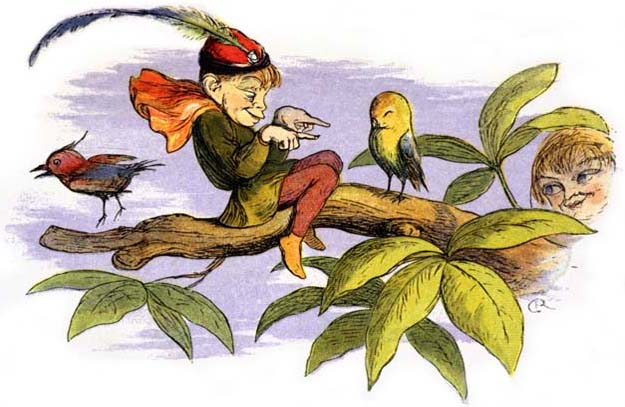
Poor little birdie teased, by the 19th-century English illustrator Richard Doyle. It depicts an elf as imagined in English folktales.

English folklore also included beliefs of the supernatural, including premonitions, curses, and magic, and was common across all social classes. It was not regarded with the same validity as scientific discoveries, but was made to be trusted by the repeated accounts of a magician or priest's clients who saw the ritual's spectacle and so believed in its efficacy. Even when such rituals failed, such as a 15th-century physician using a golden artifact to heal his patients, their failures were attributed to the fickleness of magic.

As for English folktales, some such as Weber argue that they were passed down for the purpose of reflecting the grim realities of a child's life and hence instilled valued English morals and aesthetics. Others such as Tatar would counter that these folktales' fantasies were so removed from reality that they were a form of escapism, imaginative expression, and linguistic appreciation. Most folklorists would agree that the purpose of English folklore is to protect, entertain, and instruct on how to participate in a just and fair society.

== Folktales ==
Folklorists have developed frameworks such as the Aarne–Thompson-Uther index which categorise folktales first by types of folktales and then by consistent motifs. While these stories and characters have differences according to the region of their origin, these motifs are such that there is a national identity of folktales through which these regions have interacted.

There are likely many characters and stories that have never been recorded and hence were forgotten, but these folktales and their evolutions were often a product of contemporary figures, places, or events local to specific regions. The below are only a small fraction of examples from the folktale types of English folklore.

=== Creatures ===
Dragons are giant winged reptiles that breathe fire, poison and acid. They are usually associated with treasure rooms, waterfalls, and hollowed out tree stumps.

A Wyvern is a smaller relative of dragons with two legs rather than four. It also has smaller wings and cannot breathe fire.

The black dog is a creature which foreshadows calamity or causes it. It is a combination of Odysseus' Argos and Hades' Cerberus from Greek mythology, and Fenrir from Norse mythology. The first collection of sightings of the black dog around Great Britain, Ethel Rudkin's 1938 article reports that the dog has black fur, abnormally large eyes, and a huge body. The black dog is a common motif in folklore and appears in many traditional English stories and tales. They often denote death and misfortune close at hand and appear and disappear into thin air.

A boggart is, depending on local or regional tradition, a malevolent genius loci inhabiting fields, marshes or other topographical features. The household boggart causes objects to disappear, milk to sour, and dogs to go lame. They can possess small animals, fields, churches, or houses so they can play tricks on the civilians with their chilling laugh. Always malevolent, the boggart will follow its family wherever they flee. In Northern England, at least, there was the belief that the boggart should never be named, for when the boggart was given a name, it could not be reasoned with nor persuaded, but would become uncontrollable and destructive.

A brownie is a type of hob (household spirit), similar to a hobgoblin. Brownies are said to inhabit houses and aid in tasks around the house. However, they do not like to be seen and will only work at night, traditionally in exchange for small gifts or food. Among food, they especially enjoy porridge and honey. They usually abandon the house if their gifts are called payments, or if the owners of the house misuse them. Brownies make their homes in an unused part of the house.

A dwarf is a human-shaped entity that dwells in mountains and in the earth, and is associated with wisdom, smithing, mining, and crafting. The term had only started to be used in the 19th century as a translation for the German, French, and Scandinavian words which describe dwarfs.

Ogres are usually tall, strong, violent, greedy, and remarkably dull monsters and they originate from French culture. In folktales they are likely to be defeated by being outsmarted.

Mermaids and Mermen have the upper half of a human and the lower half of a fish. They inhabit the waters along the coast, rivers and pools. In folktales they can be friendly towards humans, granting them knowledge, wishes and magical objects, or they can be malevolent, cursing individuals and places, and even drowning people. In England mermaid stories appear in Cornwall, East Anglia, Herefordshire, Staffordshire, Derbyshire, Cheshire, Merseyside, and Yorkshire.

The Will-o'-the-wisp is a folk explanation of strange, flickering lights seen around marshes and bogs. Some perceive them as souls of unbaptized infants which lead travellers off the forest path and into danger, while others perceive them as trickster fairies or sprites.

=== Characters and personifications ===
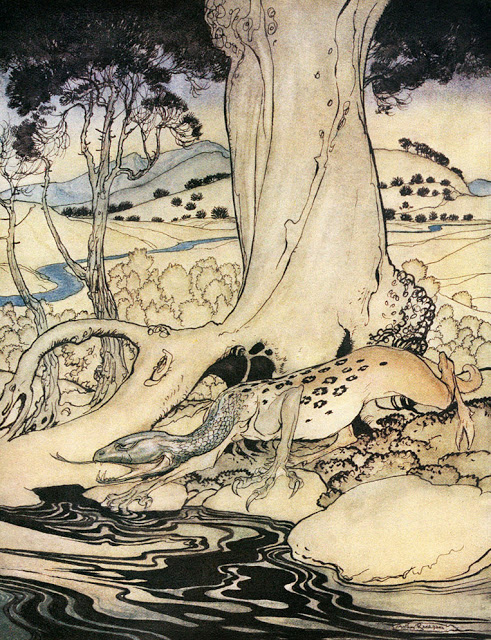
An image of 'The Questing Beast', a monster slain by King Arthur and his knights in Malory's Morte Darthur

King Arthur is the legendary king of the Britons, the Once and Future King and True Born King of England. The origins of King Arthur and his exploits are vague due to the many reproductions of his character. The Historia Brittonum and the Annales Cambriae reference many battles of an Arthur, Annales Cambriae also referencing Mordred, a rival, and Merlin, a wise mentor. Although these sources have been used as proof for Arthur's origins, their credibility has been disputed as mythology rather than history. As English folklore has progressed, King Arthur's retellings have been classified into romances such as Malory's Morte Darthur, chronicles such as Geoffrey's Historia Regum Britanniae, and fantasies such as Culhwch ac Olwen (whose author is unknown).

Robin Hood was a vicious outlaw who expressed the working-class' disenchantment with the status quo. Through Robin Hood, the forest (called the "greenwood" by folklorists) transformed from the dangerous, mystical battleground of Arthur to a site of sanctuary, comradery, and lawlessness. Rather than a philanthropic thief of the rich, Robin Hood's tales began in the 15th century as a brutal outlaw, ballads revelling in his violent retaliation to threats. Robin Hood fought to protect himself and his group the Merry Men, regardless the class, age, or gender of their enemy. In stories such as 'Robin Hood and the Widow's Three Sons' and 'The Tale of Gamelyn', the joyful ending is in the hanging of the sheriff and the officials; in 'Robin Hood and the Monk', Robin Hood kills a monk and his young helper. Paradoxical to English values of strict adherence to the law and honour, Robin Hood was glorified in ballads and stories for his banishment from society.

Robin Goodfellow, or Puck, is a shape-changing fairy known for his tricks. Since some English superstition suspected that fairies were demons, 17th century publications such as 'Robin Good-Fellow, his Mad Prankes and Merry Jests' and 'The Anatomy of Melancholy' portrayed him as a demon.

Lob, also called loby, looby, lubbard, lubber, or lubberkin, is the name given to a fairy with a dark raincloud as a body. It has a mischievous character and can describe any fairy-like creature from British folklore. It can be confused with Lob Lie-By-The-Fire, a strong, hairy giant which helps humans.

=== Stories ===
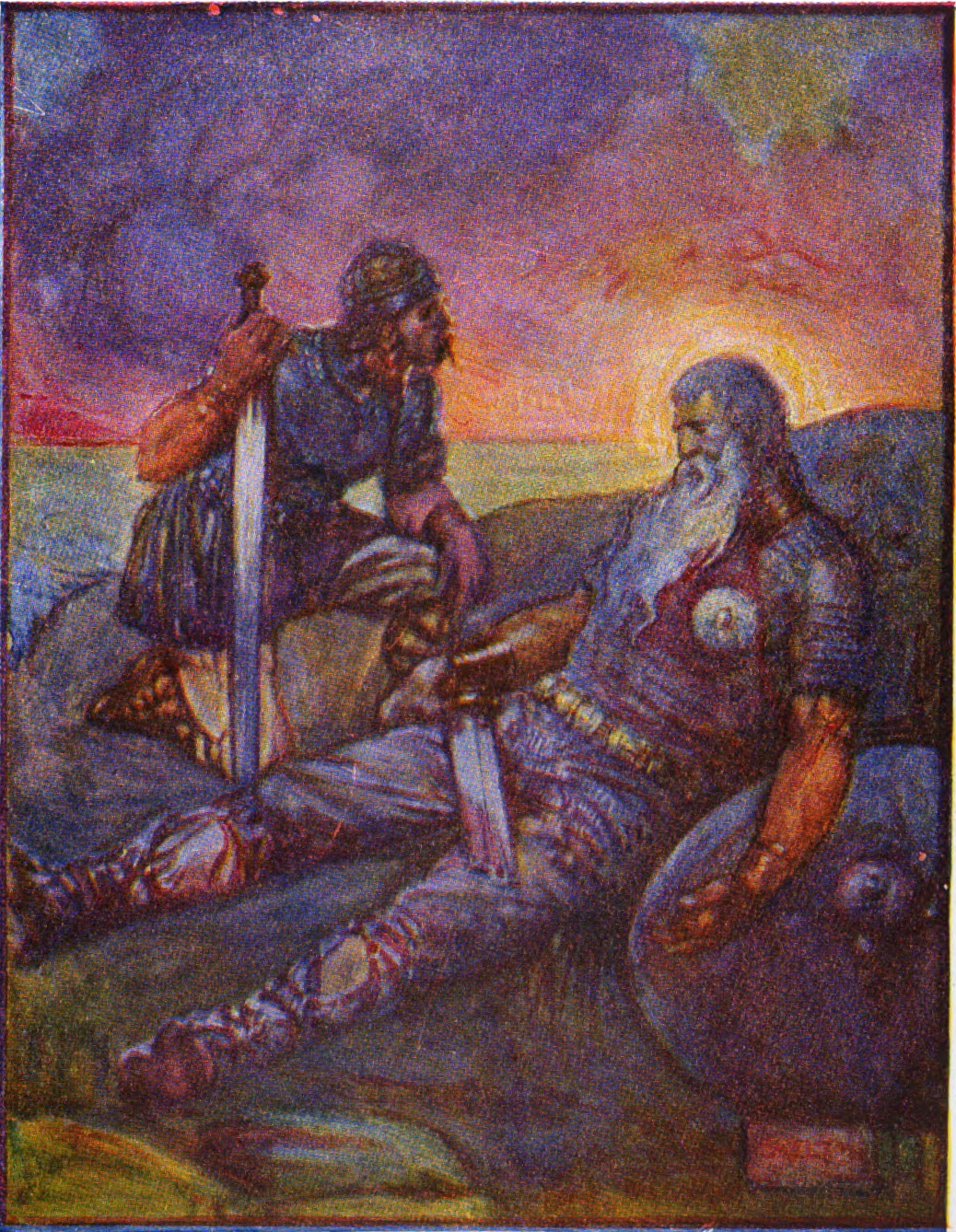
Beowulf on his deathbed after slaying the dragon that attacked his home. Beside him is Wiglaf, the only soldier to fight with him against the dragon.

Beowulf is an anonymous Old English historical epic of 3182 lines which describes the adventures of its titular character, prince Beowulf of Geats. The story goes that Beowulf slays Grendel, a monster who has tormented the hall of Hrothgar King of the Danes for twelve years. Grendel's mother seeks to gain revenge and Beowulf slays her also, after which Beowulf becomes king of the Danes himself. After 50 years, Beowulf's people are tormented by a dragon and Beowulf dies while slaying her. Original speculation was that Beowulf was a Scandinavian epic translated to English, theorised due to the story's Scandinavian settings. However, Beowulf was cemented as an Old English epic through the study that heroes of folklore are not ordinarily natives of the country they save.

The Brown Lady of Raynham is a story of the ghost of a woman of Norfolk, Lady Dorothy Walpole. After her adultery was discovered, she was confined to her chambers until death and roamed the halls of Raynham, named after the brown brocade she wears. Differing versions of the story attest that she was locked in by her husband, Lord Townsend, or by the Countess of Wharton.

The Legend of the Mistletoe Bough is a ghost story which has been associated with many mansions and stately homes in England. The tale describes how a new bride, playing a game of hide-and-seek during her wedding breakfast, hid in a chest in an attic and was unable to escape. She was not discovered by her family and friends, and suffocated. The body was allegedly found many years later in the locked chest.

== Other types of folklore ==
=== Beliefs and motifs ===
Standing stones are man-made stone structures made to stand up. Some small standing stones can also be arranged in groups to form miniliths. Similar to these geological artefacts are hill figures. These are figures drawn into the countryside by digging into the ground and sometimes filling it in with a mineral of a contrasting colour. Examples are the Cerne Abbas Giant, the Uffington White Horse, and the Long Man of Wilmington and are the focus for folktales and beliefs.

The Green Man is a description originating in 1939 which describes the engraved sculpture of a face with leaves growing from it in English architecture. His presence symbolises nature, but he is depicted differently according to where he is engraved and who carves him; on a church he may symbolise either inspiration or lust, or he may symbolise an ancient protector of travellers in a forest. The phrase originated from 'whifflers' who dressed in leaves or hair to make way for processions during pageants from the 15th to 18th centuries.

There was a belief that those born at the chime hours could see ghosts. The time differed according to region, usually based around the times of monk's prayer which were sometimes marked by a chime.

Crop circles are formations of flattened cereal. While they have been speculated to have mysterious and often extraterrestrial origins, most crop circles have been proven to be hoaxes. Those made by Doug Bower and Dave Chorley across England in 1991 have since started chains of copycats around the world.

Cunning folk was a term used to refer to male and female healers, magicians, conjurers, fortune-tellers, potion-makers, exorcists, or thieves. Such people were respected, feared and sometimes hunted for their breadth of knowledge which was suspected as supernatural.

The wild hunt was a description of a menacing group of huntsmen which either rode across the sky or on lonely roads. Their presence was a hallmark of the perception of the countryside as a wild and mystical place.

=== Practices ===
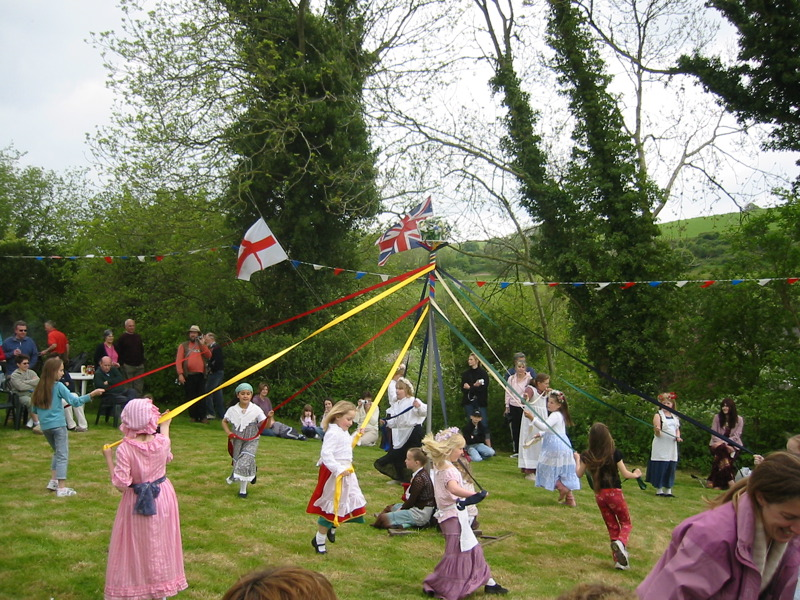
A maypole dance held at Winterbourne Houghton in 2006.

On May Day, the first day of May, a tall, decorated pole is put up as a symbol of fertility called a maypole. The maypole may represents a phallic object impregnating the earth at the end of spring to ensure a bountiful summer, but this association is very late. The maypoles were decorated originally with flowers and carved from the branches of trees about to bloom to symbolise the birth of new life. Eventually the flowers were replaced with ribbons and May day became a day for celebration and dancing in which a May queen and sometimes a May king would be crowned to also symbolise fertility.

A parish ale is a type of party in the parish usually held to fundraise money for a particular purpose.

Plough Monday was a custom in which, on the first Monday after Christmas, men visited people's doorsteps at night and asked for a token for the holiday. They carried whips and a makeshift plough and dug up the house's doorstep or scraper if the house refused to give them an item.

Corn dollies are a form of straw work made as part of harvest customs of Europe before the First World War. Their use varied according to region: it may have been decorative, an image of pride for the harvest, or a way to mock nearby farms which had not yet collected their harvest. There has been a recent resurgence in their creation led by Minnie Lambeth in the 1950s and 1960s through her book A Golden Dolly: The Art, Mystery, and History of Corn Dollies.

A superstition among children was that, if the first word uttered in the month was "Rabbit!", then that person would have good luck for the rest of the month. Variants include: "rabbit, rabbit, rabbit!", "rabbit, rabbit, white rabbit!", and "white rabbit!".

After a person died, a poor person was hired to take on their sins by eating before or after the funeral over their body – a sin-eater. The sin-eater would hence ensure that the recently deceased would be taken to heaven.

=== Items ===
Sir Francis Drake's Drum is a legend about the drum of an English admiral who raided Spanish treasure fleets and Spanish ports. He was believed to have white magic which enabled him to turn into a dragon (as hinted by his name, Drake meaning dragon in Latin). When he died, the drum which he brought on his voyage around the world was sung about – that in England's peril, they could strike it and he would come to their aid. Eventually the legend evolved to be that the drum would strike itself in England's peril, and it has been heard struck since.

A hagstone, also called a holed stone or adder stone, is a type of stone, usually glassy, with a naturally occurring hole through it. Such stones have been discovered by archaeologists in both Britain and Egypt. In England it was used as a counter-charm for sleep paralysis, called hag-riding by tradition.

A petrifying well is a well which, when items are placed into it, they appear to be covered in stone. Items also acquire a stony texture when left in the well for an extended period of time. Examples in England include Mother Shipton's Cave in Knaresborough and Matlock Bath in Derbyshire.

== Common folklore ==
- Charivari
- Elfshot
- Green Man
- Merry England
- Ned Ludd
- Nursery rhyme / Mother Goose
- Pillywiggin
- Saint George's Day in England
- Sir Gowther
- The King of the Cats
- The Three Dead Kings
- Tudor myth

== Folklore local to specific areas ==
=== Folklore of East Anglia ===
- St. Audrey
- Babes in the Wood at Wayland Wood
- The Black Shuck – A Black Dog
- Borley Rectory
- Caxton Gibbet
- St. Edmund of East Anglia
- Gnomes
- Green children of Woolpit
- St. Guthlac of Croyland
- Hereward the Wake
- Hyter sprites
- Jack Valentine
- Lantern man
- The mermaid of Upper Sheringham
- Molly dance
- King Cole and St. Helena
- The Pedlar of Swaffham
- Religious visions at Walsingham
- Shug Monkey
- Tom Hickathrift
- Turpin's Cave
- Witch bottles

=== Folklore of London and the South East ===
- Sir Bevis of Hampton
- Biddenden Maids
- Bran the Blessed's Head at the Tower of London
- Brutus of Troy, the legendary founder of London
- Clapham Wood, an area of strange activity
- Devil's Jumps, Churt
- Devil's Jumps, Treyford
- Devil's Punch Bowl
- Electric Horror of Berkeley Square
- St. Frideswide
- Ghost of Rahere
- Gog and Magog, legendary giants and guardians of the City of London
- Hengest and Horsa, legendary founders of Saxon England
- Herne the Hunter – a related to the Wild Hunt
- Highgate Vampire
- Hoodening
- Kit's Coty House
- Lady Lovibond
- Lazy Laurence
- London Bridge is falling down
- London Stone
- King Lud, connected with the City of London
- Mallard Song
- Mowing-Devil of Hertfordshire
- Oranges and Lemons
- The Ratman of Southend
- Theatre Royal, Drury Lane
- Ravens of the Tower of London
- Rollright Stones
- Stockwell ghost
- Spring Heeled Jack
- Swan Upping
- Swearing on the Horns
- Wayland the Smith
- Yernagate, the giant guardian of the New forest
- Jack the Ripper

=== Folklore of the Midlands ===
- Alkborough Turf Maze
- Belgrave Hall and its ghosts
- Black Annis
- Black Lady of Bradley Woods
- Border Morris
- Bottle-kicking
- Byard's Leap
- Chained Oak
- The Derby Ram
- Dun Cow
- Fulk FitzWarin
- Godiva
- Guy of Warwick
- Haxey Hood Game
- Jack of Kent
- Lincoln Imp
- Little Saint Hugh of Lincoln
- Madam Pigott
- Major Oak
- Mermaid's Pool
- Nanny Rutt
- Old Jeffrey
- Relics of St. Oswald
- Robin Hood
- Royal Shrovetide Football
- Stiperstones
- Tiddy Mun
- Wise Men of Gotham
- Witches of Belvoir
- The Giant of the Wrekin
- Yallery-Brown

=== Folklore of Yorkshire and the North East ===
- The Barghest
- The Cauld Lad of Hylton
- St. Cuthbert
- The Devil's Arrows
- Dunnie
- Duergar
- The Hedley Kow
- Jack-In-Irons
- Jingling Geordie's Hole
- Halifax Gibbet
- Kilburn White Horse
- John the Jibber
- Laidly Worm
- The Lambton Worm
- Legend of Upsall Castle
- Long Sword dance
- My Own Self
- Peg Powler
- Peg Fyfe
- Rapper sword
- Redcap
- Robin Hood
- Sedgefield Ball Game
- Ursula Southeil

=== Folklore of the North West ===
- Adam Bell
- The Wizard of Alderley Edge
- Arthur o' Bower
- D'ye ken John Peel (song)
- Folklore of Lancashire
- Furness Abbey and its ghosts
- Grindylow
- Gytrash
- Jenny Greenteeth
- John Middleton
- Long Meg and Her Daughters
- Pendle Witches
- Samlesbury witches
- Wild Boar of Westmorland

=== Folklore of the South West ===
- Abbotsbury Garland Day
- Barber surgeon of Avebury
- Tom Bawcock
- Belas Knap
- Bowerman's Nose
- Brutus Stone
- Cerne Abbas Giant
- Cheese rolling
- Childe's Tomb
- Corineus, legendary founder of Cornwall
- Crazywell Pool
- Devil's Footprints
- Dorset Ooser
- St. Dunstan is the origin of the lucky horseshoe
- Folklore of Stonehenge
- Glastonbury and its abbey
- Glastonbury Thorn
- Goblin Combe
- Goram and Vincent
- Hairy hands
- Hunky punk
- Jack the Giant Killer and Galligantus
- Jan Tregeagle
- Jay's Grave
- Lyonesse
- Moonrakers, the story of how the inhabitants of Wiltshire got their nickname
- The Obby Oss of Padstow
- Pixies
- Prussia Cove
- Punkie Night
- The Great Thunderstorm, Widecombe
- Three hares (Tinners' Rabbits)
- Tintagel, legendary birthplace of King Arthur
- Warren House Inn
- Widecombe Fair
- Witch of Wookey Hole

== See also ==
- Cornish mythology
- English mythology
- Once upon a time
- Scottish mythology
- Welsh mythology

=== Cycles of legend in the British Isles ===
- Matter of Britain
- Matter of England

=== Related figures ===
- Cecil Sharp
- Sabine Baring-Gould
