= Yernagate =

Legendary giant from English folklore

Yernagate is a legendary giant from English folklore, supposedly a guardian of the New Forest area of Hampshire. The story goes that Yernagate was a giant who got tired of people stealing too much wood from the forest, and threw a man so high that he landed on the moon. Yernagate is also reputed to have taken a nap, causing a mound in the earth to be named Yernagate's Nap.

== Origins ==
The story of Yernagate is an example of one of "the fable[s] of ... gyants in the woods" near Southampton, mentioned by Daniel Defoe in 1724. Though the etymology of Yernagate is unknown, the traditional link between the New Forest and giants may be connected with the Anglo-Saxon names for the area: "Ytene" and "Jettenwald" (as well as the later anglicisation of "Ettinwood"), which are interpreted by some as meaning "the wood of giants" or the "giant's weald".

According to some sources, Yernagate was a giant who was responsible for guarding the forests of Hampshire. Angry with a man for collecting so much wood he almost destroyed the forest, Yernagate threw him so high he landed on the moon, giving rise to the myth of the man in the moon. Yernagate lay down to take a nap at one particular place, forming a mound that then became known as Yernagate's Nap.

== Topography ==
Though recent Ordnance Survey maps depict the site of Yernagate's Nap as being a small deciduous wood to the south of Little Linford Inclosure, according the maps of the 18th and 19th centuries it is actually a circular Bronze Age earthwork, and located on a small hill within Little Linford.

== In popular culture ==
Renamed Yerna, the giant was also a character in a 2025 play by Kit Miles.
