= Hyter sprites =

Fairy from folklore of Norfolk, England

Hyter sprites are benevolent fairies in English folklore. Stories about them are found in East Anglia – mostly in Norfolk – and Lincolnshire. Despite their benevolence, they are described as being a type of bogeyman, used to scare children.

== Names ==
Though hyter sprite is the dominant spelling of the name in formal writing, it is only sometimes the spelling used by Norfolk natives; they are instead known by various other, equally popular names. (Note: Hikey sprites, hytersprites, highly sprites, hiker sprites, hikra sprites, ikra sprites, hight sprites, high sprites, highty sprites, and hyker sprites; among others.)

=== Etymology ===
Sprite is an English word for a type of fairy. The etymology for hyter is unknown, but is likely not a neologism. There are several proposed possibilities. Folklorogist Katharine Mary Briggs, author of An Encyclopedia of Fairies, suggested that hyter may originate from the dialectical word hyte (“to travel”).

It may alternatively be derived from German heitergeist (“cheerful ghost”); one of Danish hytte (“to take care of oneself”) and beskytte (“preserve, defend, secure”); Dutch/Flemish hoden (“to keep, to guard, to protect”); or Old Saxon hôdian (“care for, guard, protect”); or one of Scottish hyte (“crazy”) and hyter ("walk with unsteady movement, stumble").

Old English hēdan (“to heed, guard, keep”) is noted as particularly likely, as other Old English words have survived in the Norfolk dialect, and hyter sprites are connected to the protection of children. This would make hyter sprite roughly mean 'heeder sprite'.

The name hyter sprite as a whole may have been a corruption of the word heteroclite. A respondent to Daniel Allen Rabuzzi during the creation of the Folklore article In Pursuit of Norfolk's Hyter Sprites wrote the following:

Imagine the village priest seeking to impress the locals. He uses the word ‘heteroclyte;’ it would appeal to him, just as ‘acolyte’ does. As soon as he left the pub, followed by the polite farewells of the local fishermen and farmworkers and smugglers as well, one of the smugglers would look across to another, his voice heavy with pretended fear. ‘Well now my ole booty, I wonder if any of them ole hikersprites creep around our marshes of a night?’

— Morris Arthur (published by Daniel Allen Rabuzzi), In Pursuit of Norfolk's Hyter Sprites

The English Dialect Dictionary by Joseph Wright features the word hyterprites, meaning "antics," but there is likely no connection other than superficial similarity.

== Beliefs ==
Hyter sprite belief has been found throughout East Anglia – by far most prevalent in the county of Norfolk – and Lincolnshire. It is most prevalent in the east of Norfolk. Winterton, Lincolnshire and Sparham, Norfolk have higher than average amounts of stories of hyter sprites.

Beliefs in hyter sprites have declined following World War II, and in modern times belief is near-exclusively found within people in old age.

=== Characteristics ===
Hyter sprites are usually regarded as benevolent, but are nonetheless treated as a type of bogeyman, used as a warning to scare children. Parents would say to their children that hyter sprites would get them if they were out in the dark. Sometimes, hyter sprites are explicitly associated with the night, lacking any bogeyman-type disciplinary method; other times, they are a disciplinary method without any connection to darkness.

Hyter sprites are said to be able to transform into sand martins, and are supposedly most active during dusk. They are said to live near Blow Hill in Great Melton.

Hyter sprites are said to be pranksters, and are sometimes blamed if things go wrong. They are also known to bring home lost children, as well as to tie up donkeys that strayed away.

They are sometimes regarded as a type of glowing marsh gas or atmospheric ghost light, likely as a result of conflation with lantern men or will-o’-the-wisps.

=== Appearance ===
Hyter sprites have no definitive appearance; entirely up to personal interpretation rather than group consensus.

A common interpretation, originating in Ruth Tongue’s 1970 book Forgotten Folk Tales of the English Counties, is that they have sand-coloured (yellow or brown) skin, green eyes, and are small in size; usually reaching the height of the human knee but being able to shift to the height of a human.

Other noteworthy interpretations include that they are flickering blue fires, long-limbed and spider-like, and that they are be able to shapeshift into what those who see them fear.

== History ==
Myths of the hyter sprite were first recorded in print in 1872, within a contribution by Walter Rye to The Eastern Counties Collectanea by John L’Estrange. Rye later repeated himself in his 1877 book The Norfolk Antiquarian Miscellany, adding that belief was still widespread at the time. Ruth Tongue’s 1970 book Forgotten Folk Tales of the English Counties is the first known description of the sandy-colored green-eyed appearance popularized today.

== In culture ==
Ray Loveday’s book The Hikey Sprites: the Twilight of a Norfolk Tradition is about hyter sprites.
