= Girolamo Segato =

Italian naturalist (1792–1836)

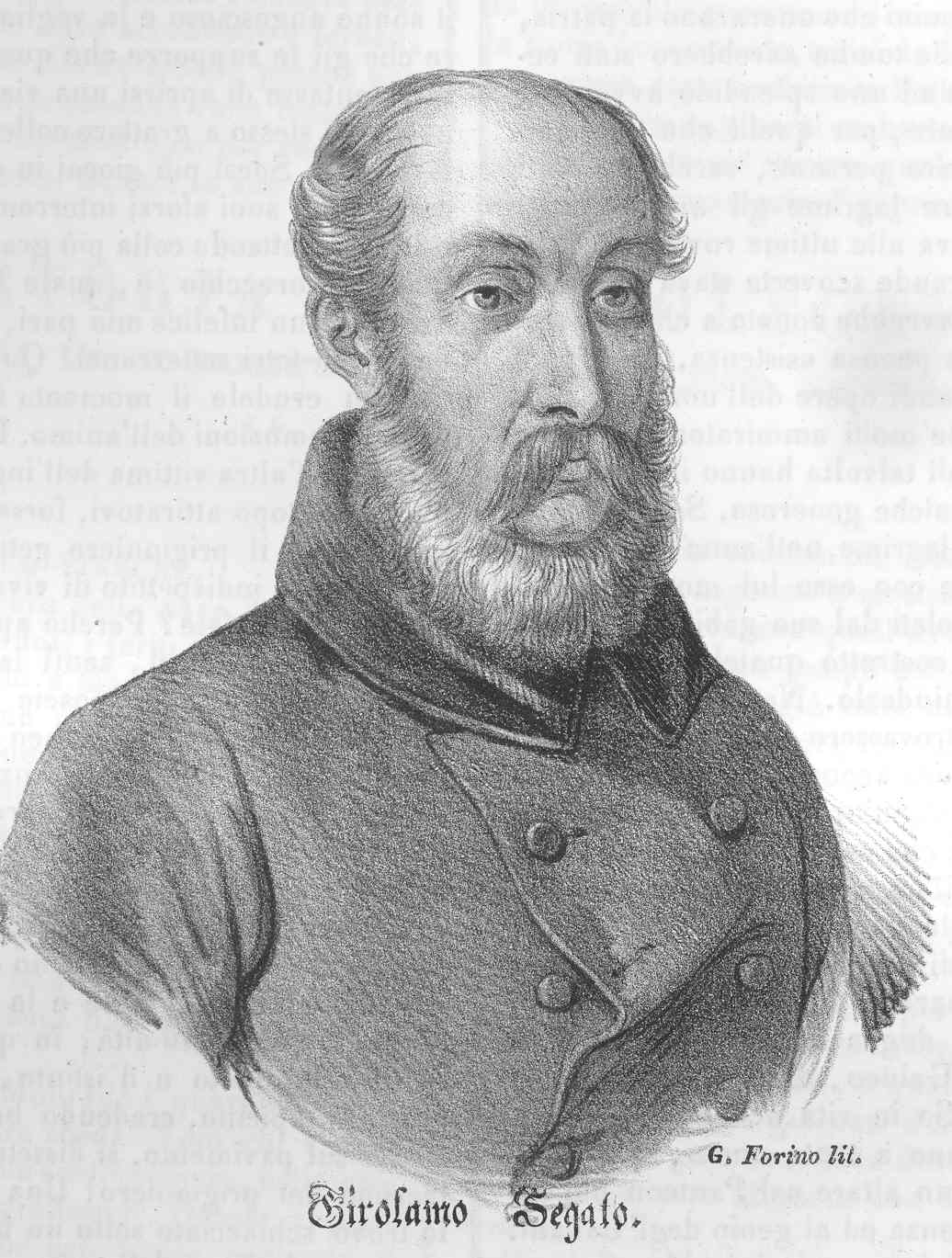
Girolamo Segato

Girolamo Segato (13 June 1792 – 3 February 1836) was an Italian naturalist, cartographer, Egyptologist, and anatomist. He is perhaps best known for his work in the artificial petrifaction of human cadavers.

Segato was born in the Carthusian monastery of Vedana. As a child, Segato learned basic sciences from Antonio Bagini, a Sospirolo priest. After studying under Bagini, Segato spent a short time as an accountant in Treviso before returning to secondary schooling in Belluno, where his teacher was Tomaso Antonio Catullo.

From 1818 onwards Segato participated in several archaeological expeditions to Egypt, where he became an expert in the techniques of mummification; however, most of his studies undertaken during these trips were lost.

Upon his return to Florence in 1823, Segato developed a technique similar to mummification, but unique: rather than simply removing water from cadavers, Segato's method consisted of what appears to be mineralization or "petrification". His particular technique permitted to save the original colors and features of the textures, besides their elasticity. Most of his works can be found perfectly preserved at the University of Florence, but there is also an example at the Royal Palace of Caserta: a table in the Old Apartments, the surface of which is made with the "petrification" technique.

Word soon spread that Segato had acquired knowledge of Egyptian magic. Hampered by the society of his time, he was prompted to destroy all his notes before his death. Segato took to the grave the secret of the technique he developed, which, despite numerous studies and attempts to imitate, remains mysterious. It is said that, on his death, he would reveal his secret to his friend Pellegrini (nicknamed Pellegro), but he died prematurely.

He died in 1836, and was buried in the Basilica of Santa Croce. Today, many of Segato's surviving petrified human remains can be found in the Museum of the Department of Anatomy in Florence.

In a 1848 book, Valentine Mott said the collection included snakes, frogs, toads, fishes, birds, and parts of the human body, preserving color and shape. His process most likely involved different techniques for different pieces.
