= Jingling Geordie's Hole =

Cave in Tynmouth, England

- Jingling Man's Hole
- Location within Tyne and Wear
- Location: Tyne and Wear, England
- OS grid: NZ373694
- Coordinates: 55.018°N 1.417°W

Jingling Geordie's Hole is a cave that has inspired a legend in Tynemouth, England.

The cave is between King Edward's Bay and Tynemouth Castle. It was originally known as "Jingling Man's Hole", the "Geordie" being a later addition.

Jingling Geordie is reputed to have been a 17th-century pirate and smuggler who used the cave as a lookout for incoming ships. This gave him advance opportunity to lie in wait at the nearby Black Middens where he would lure the ships onto the rocks with lanterns placed to look like boats waiting safely at anchor. He would then plunder the strewn cargoes and hide his booty away in a labyrinth of tunnels running beneath the Castle. Legend has it that Jingling Geordie still had fetters fixed around his legs and the chains rattled everywhere he went. Supposedly the jingle can still be heard on some evenings around the castle walls as his ghost stalks the cliffs keeping a watch over the headland.

== Location ==
Jingling Geordie's Cave can be described as follows: Tynemouth Castle lies perched on a promontory surrounded on three sides by cliffs which drop for about 100 feet (30 m) to the sea below. The cliffs on the south side mark the uppermost point of the mouth of the River Tyne and slope at the bottom into a little beach called the Priors' Haven. The north cliffs overlook a small sandy bay which stretches for about 300 yards (270 m). Carved into these cliffs, about halfway up, is a perfectly rectangular window that looks out across the bay and gives a wide view of the North Sea. The window is about 5 feet (1.5 m) high by 3 feet (0.91 m) wide.

Getting down to this lookout point requires crawling down a steep zigzag path about a foot wide. At the entrance of the cave is a narrow gap between the cliff on the left and part of the castle wall which stretches upwards for about 60 feet (18 m) to the walkway above. It is in this wall that the window is cut, while on the other side there is a very small hole which was formerly the tunnel entrance but was blocked off some years ago to stop people venturing down there. All that is left is a slit about a foot long and a couple of inches wide. A torch can be shone down this hole but nothing can be made out.

== Legends ==
Local legend says that the cave conceals a fabulous amount of treasure. This inspired a further legend that a boy named Walter went to look for the treasure when his mother told him the story. He resolved to make the finding of the treasure his "quest" as part of his knighthood. He began the quest on the Eve of St John (24 June, traditionally the day before Midsummer).

Sir Walter is said to have entered the cave and ignored the spectre and dragon that attempted to distract him. He discovered a gateway with a bugle hanging from a golden cord. He blew the bugle three times, which caused the doors of the gateway to open to reveal a large and brightly lit hall. The hall was supported by pillars of jasper and crystal, with gold lamps illuminating piles of gold and gems. The treasures were removed by Sir Walter and he became a wealthy landowner, called "the Lord of a Hundred Castles".

The legend is mentioned in a folk song, which ends with the lines

Gold heaped upon gold, and emeralds green
And diamonds and rubies, and sapphires untold
Rewarded the courage of Walter the Bold.
