= John L'Estrange =

English antiquarian

- Born: 18 January 1836; Norwich
- Died: 13 October 1877 (aged 41)
- Occupation: Antiquarian

John L'Estrange (18 January 1836 – 13 October 1877) was an English antiquarian from Norfolk.

== Biography ==
L'Estrange was born at Norwich on 18 January 1836. He became a clerk in the stamp office at Norwich, and, though much tied by his occupation there, found time to make very large collections for the history of the county of Norfolk and the city of Norwich. He died, at the comparatively early age of forty-one, on 13 October 1877, and was buried in the Norwich cemetery. He was a Roman catholic. He married, on 4 June 1858, Mary Maris of Bacton, Norfolk. He left six children, three of whom have since died.

Most of L'Estrange's manuscripts passed on his death into the collection of Walter Rye. Among them may be named ‘A List of the Freemen and Apprentices of Norwich from Edward IV to Edward VI,’ containing many thousand names, which has been published since his death, edited by the writer of this notice (1888). He also made voluminous extracts from the court books of the city of Norwich and the book of St. George's guild, and transcribed no less than four of the early churchwardens' books of the city of Norwich. His most useful work, however, is found in his collections from the wills at the Norwich registry, now bound in four volumes fol.: they throw immense light on the history of the fabric of the Norfolk churches and the lives of their incumbents. He was editor of the ‘Eastern Counties Collectanea,’ which he conducted with success for twenty-four numbers (Jan. 1872 to Dec. 1873), but his only published work was one on ‘The Church Bells of Norfolk,’ Norwich, 1874, which for erudition, ability, and research is certainly unequalled by any other book on campanology.
