= Al Ana =

Female spirit or demon in Turkic folklore

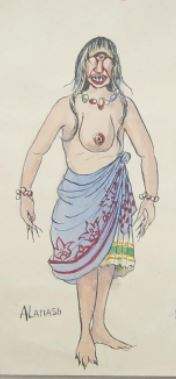
Depiction of Al Ana by Azerbaijani painter Azim Azimzade, 1939.

Al Ana (Tuvan and Kyrgyz: Аль Ана, Turkish and Azerbaijani: Al Ana) is a female fatal spirit or demon in Turkic folklore. Al Ana was said to live in thickets near rivers, streams and lakes.

== Description ==
According to some oral narratives, she took the form of an ugly, old woman with a hairy body, long straight hair and breasts so huge that she uses them to wash her clothes. On her head she wore a red hat with a fern twig attached to it.

Al Ana was said to kidnap human babies just after they were born and replace them with her own children, known as foundlings or changelings. A changeling could be recognized by its uncommon appearance – disproportionate body, often with some kind of disability – as well as its wickedness. It had a huge abdomen, unusually small or large head, a hump, thin arms and legs, a hairy body and long claws; it also prematurely cut its first teeth. Its behaviour was said to be marked by a great spitefulness towards people around it, a fear of its mother, noisiness, reluctance to sleep and exceptional gluttony. As an adult (which was in fact rare, as nearly all changelings were thought to die in early childhood) it was disabled, gibbered instead of talked, and mistrusted people.

To protect a child against being kidnapped by Al Ana, a mother had to tie a red ribbon around its hand (this custom is still preserved in some regions of Anatolia, although without the original meaning), put a red hat on its head and shield its face from the light of the moon. Under no circumstances should she wash its nappies after sunset nor turn her head away from the child when it was asleep.

Most at risk of becoming one of these demons after death were thought to be midwives, old maids, unmarried mothers, pregnant women who die before childbirth, as well as abandoned children born out of wedlock.

== Etymology ==
The word Al (or Hal; Azerbaijani: Xal, Oirat: Һал) means in old Turkic, red color, fire or evil. And Ana contains the meaning of mother.

== See also ==
- Ala (demon)

== Sources ==
- Türk Mitolojisi Ansiklopedik Sözlük, Celal Beydili, Yurt Yayınevi
- Götter und Mythen der Kaukasischen und Iranischen Völker, Carsten Colpe, P. 89
