= Lazy Laurence =

Legendary fairy from English folklore

Lazy Laurence is a pixie and nature spirit in English folklore who inhabits the New Forest area of Hampshire and Dorset. He is traditionally associated with the protection of orchards and of cider, and known to send people to sleep beneath fruit trees, make them lazy, make them dither, or to give them stomach cramps.

== Tradition ==
Lazy Laurence is most prominently associated with the New Forest, where he regularly gives apple scrumpers and rude tourists indigestion, and sends people into a dreaming, dithery state. According to John Wise, writing in 1862, "Here in the Forest still dwell fairies. The mischievous sprite, Laurence, still holds men by his spell and makes them idle. If a peasant is lazy, it is proverbially said, 'Laurence has got upon him,' or, 'He has got a touch of Laurence.' He is still regarded with awe, and barrows are called after him."

== Origins ==
Laurence was once also known of in the neighbouring counties of Sussex and Somerset, where he was used as a bogeyman to scare children, as well as in the dialects of Devon and Cornwall, where his laziness was emphasised. An early literary reference to the figure is in a small pamphlet from the 1770s titled "The Pleasant history of lazy Laurence"

According to Brewer's Dictionary of Phrase and Fable: "it has been suggested that there is an allusion to the heat prevalent around the time of the feast of St Lawrence (10 August). Another conjecture is that there was a joke to the effect that when the martyr St Lawrence told his torturers to turn him round on his gridiron, it was because he was too lazy to move by himself."

== Topography ==
The earthwork where Lazy Laurence is traditionally believed to reside, Laurence's Barrow, is a small bell barrow situated on Beaulieu Heath, near to two other barrows (Watt's Parlour and Cold Pixies' Cave) which also have pixie associations in the local folklore.
