= The Ratman of Southend =

English urban legend

Coordinates: 51.5412°N 0.7110°E

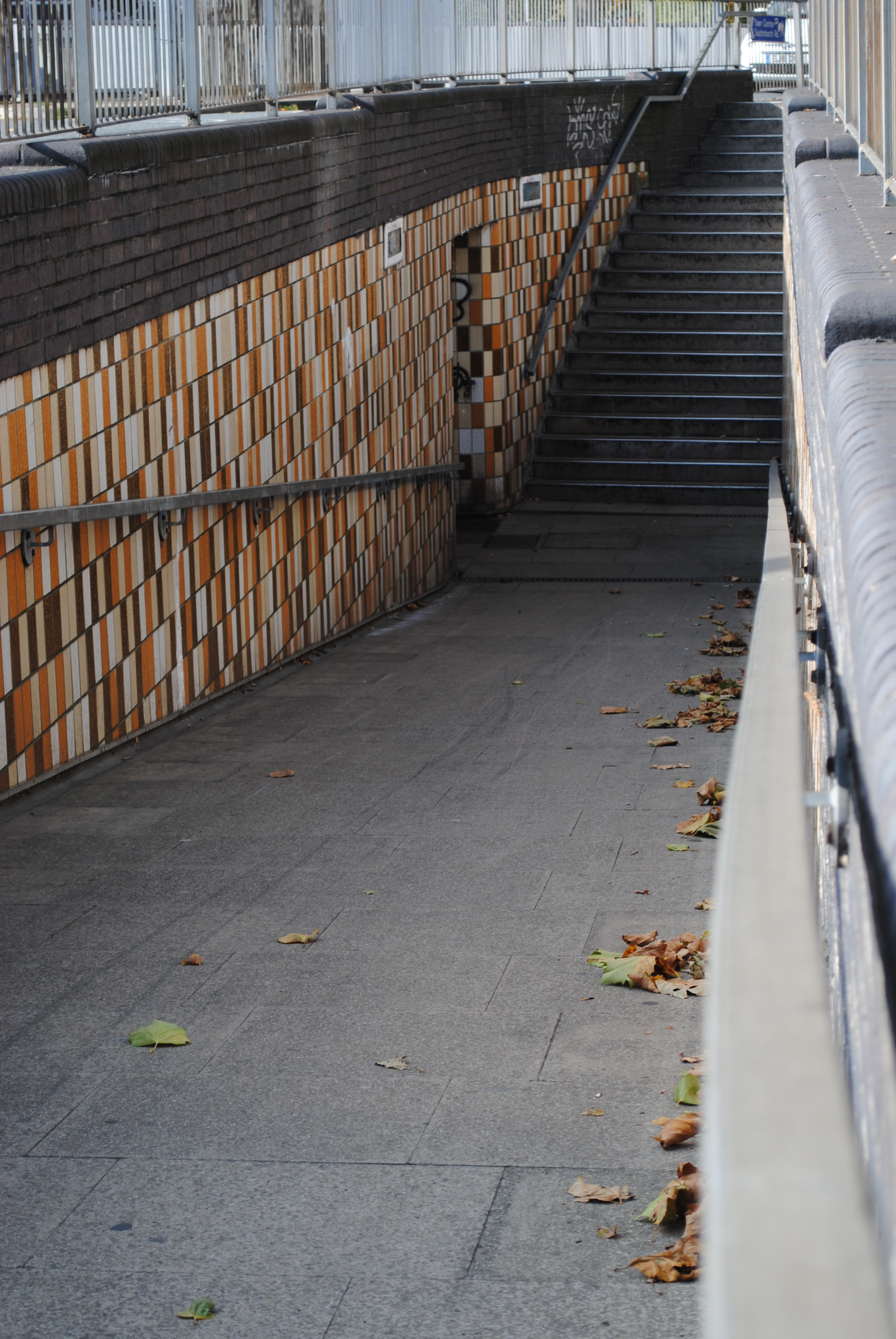
The site of the alleged Ratman hauntings in Southend-on-Sea, England.

The Ratman of Southend is an English urban legend originating in Southend-on-Sea, Essex. The story of the Ratman tells of an old homeless man, who while seeking shelter from the cold in an underpass, was set upon by a group of youths and beaten to near-death. The cold and blood loss finished his life. As he died, the numerous vermin who inhabit the area gathered, and were found to have devoured his face. After this, a ghostly figure was spotted in the underpass, with people hearing ratlike squealing, and scraping, as if large claws were moving across the walls.

== In popular culture ==
A short film about the Ratman of Southend, directed by Michael Holiday, was entered in 2019 during the annual Horror-on-Sea film festival in Southend.

In 2020, horror comics publisher Afterlight Comics released Folktales of the Cryptids Vol. 2. An anthology revolving around different folkloric creatures, in which the Ratman is included.

The Ratman of Southend appears as an enemy in the quest Anglicans and Demons in the 2024 mod for Fallout 4, Fallout: London.
