= Mermaid's Pool (Peak District) =

Pool in the moors of Derbyshire, England

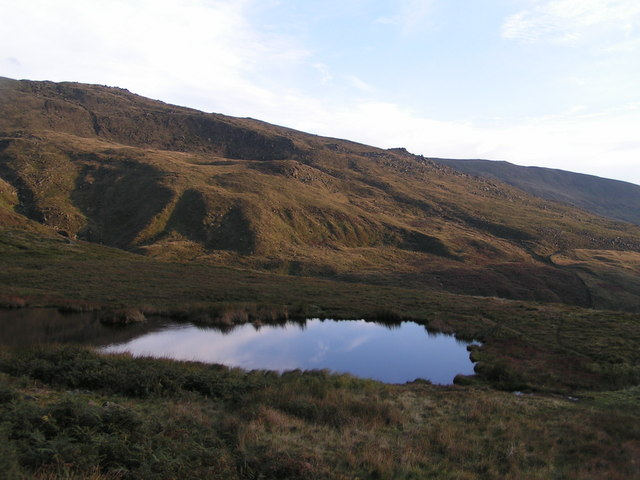
- The shallow moorland tarn

- Location within Derbyshire
- Location: Derbyshire, England
- Coordinates: 53.3949°N 1.8895°W

The pool is associated with a tradition of a supernatural female inhabitant, usually described as a mermaid. The tradition is attested in nineteenth- and early-twentieth-century sources and was connected particularly with visits to the pool at Easter. According to some accounts, anyone fortunate enough to see the mermaid at this time would be granted immortality.

The figure was sometimes described instead as a nymph or supernatural woman associated with Kinder Scout. One story tells of a local man whom she led to a cavern and made immortal. Henry Kirke also published a poem, The Mermaid's Pool, concerning a young man who falls in love with the mermaid and drowns in the pool.

Modern accounts sometimes treat the Kinder mermaid as a recently invented legend, but historical references indicate that belief in or stories about a supernatural woman at the pool had genuine local currency during the early nineteenth century.
