= Anguane =

Figure in Ladin folklore

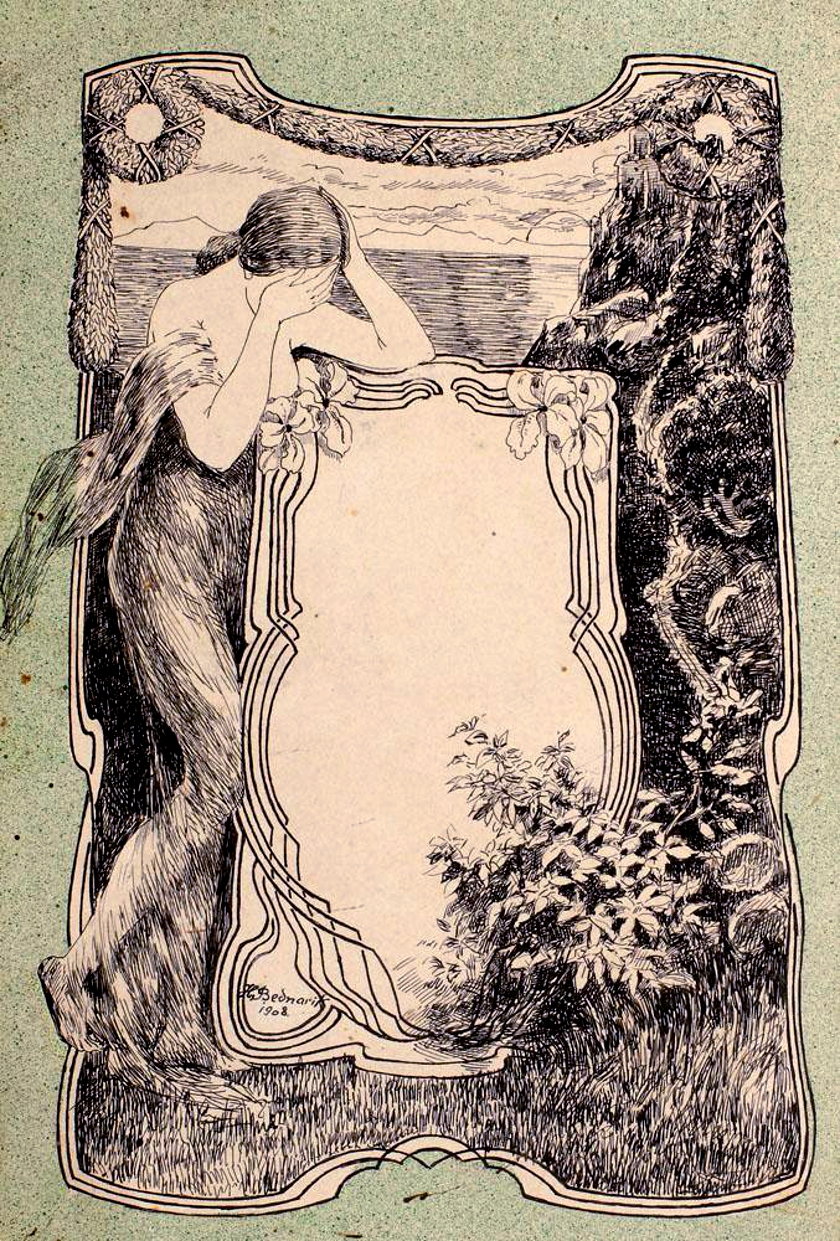
An Art Nouveau vignette to the story Zâna apelor ("Water Fairy")

Anguane are mythical creatures in Northern Italian folklore, which are traditionally depicted as cloven-footed water nymphs with beautiful faces and long breasts. They were said to have carried their children in baskets held on their backs, and to have been able to throw their breasts over their backs to nurse these children. Anguane were believed to resided in or nearby lakes. According to myth, Anguane seduce male wayfarers and help infertile women become pregnant.
