= Mother Shipton's Cave =

Cave in North Yorkshire, England

Coordinates: 54.008691°N 1.474705°W

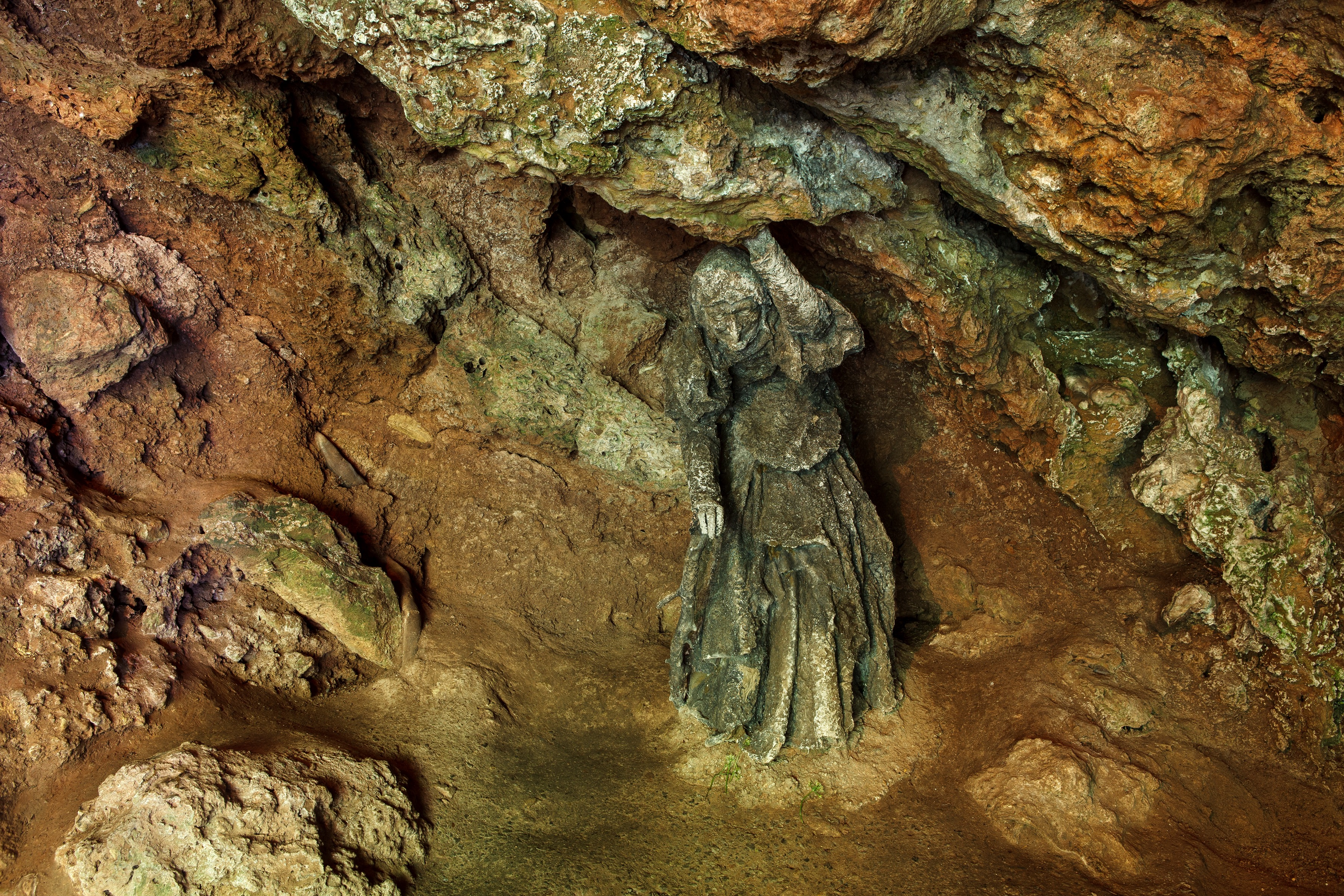
A statue of Mother Shipton in Mother Shipton's Cave

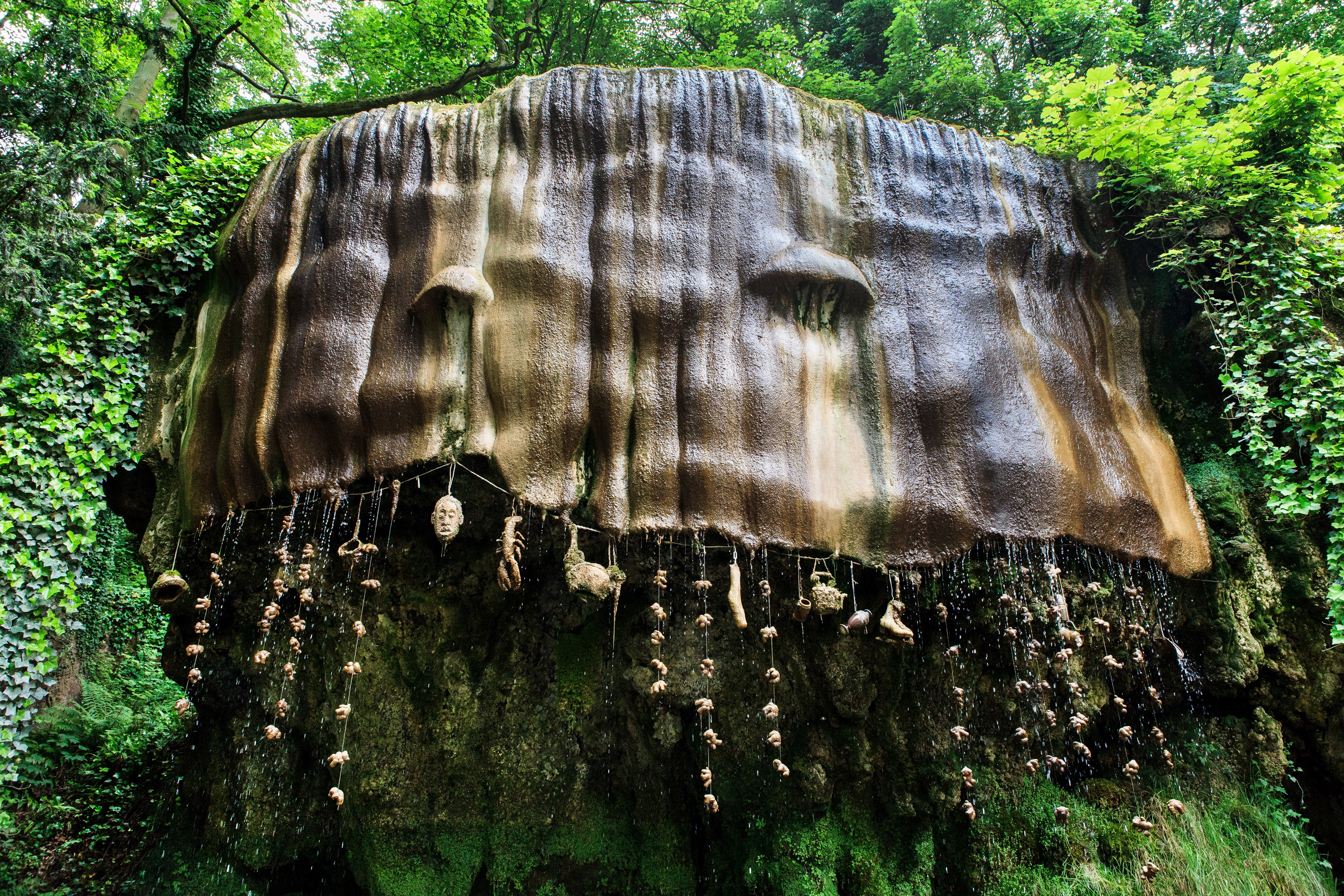
Objects hung in the falling water of the petrifying well at Mother Shipton's Cave

Mother Shipton's Cave (or "Old Mother Shipton's Cave") is at Knaresborough, North Yorkshire, England, near the River Nidd. Nearby is a petrifying well, also known as a dropping well. The latter is the oldest tourist attraction to charge a fee in England, and has been operated since 1630. The water of the well is so rich in sulphate and carbonate that artefacts may be put in the well to be "petrified" (encrusted) as a tourist attraction.

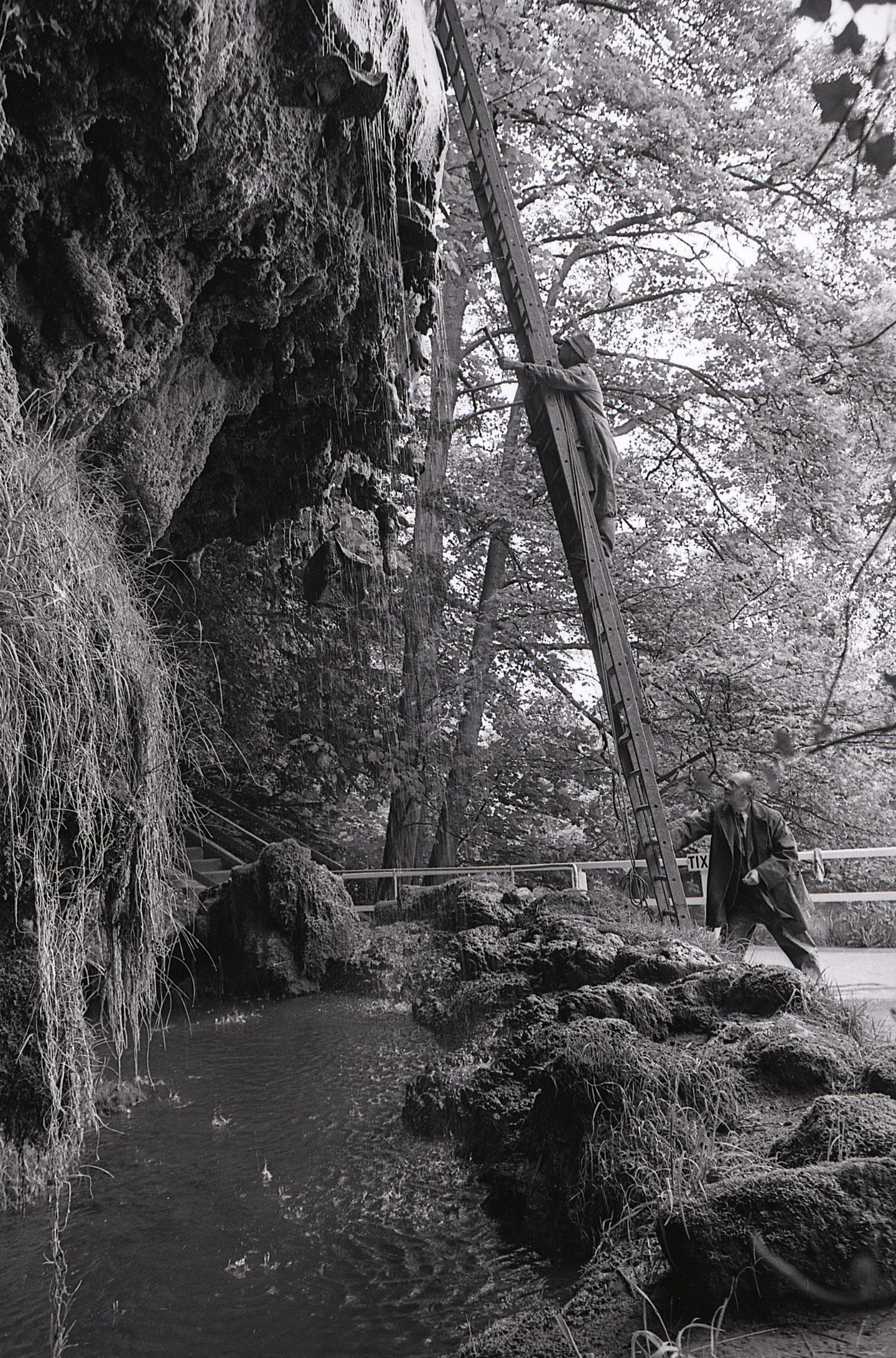
Workers hanging objects to be calcified at Mother Shipton's Cave in 1975

The place is associated with the legendary soothsayer and prophetess Mother Shipton (c. 1488 – 1561), born Ursula Southeil, and reportedly the wife of Toby Shipton. According to legend, she was born in the cave. The cave and dropping well, together with other attractions, remain open to visitors and are run privately by Mother Shipton's Cave Ltd.
