= Canotila =

Creature from Lakota mythology

In Lakota mythology, čanotila ("they live in a tree") are a race of forest-dwelling creatures, similar to fairies.

The čanotila are forest spirits of Sioux folklore, usually appearing as sprites or dwarves. "Čanoti" literally means "tree dweller," and "čanotila" means "little tree dweller." They were considered messengers from the spirit world and often appeared to Sioux people in dreams.
