= Petrifying well =

Body of water with high mineral content

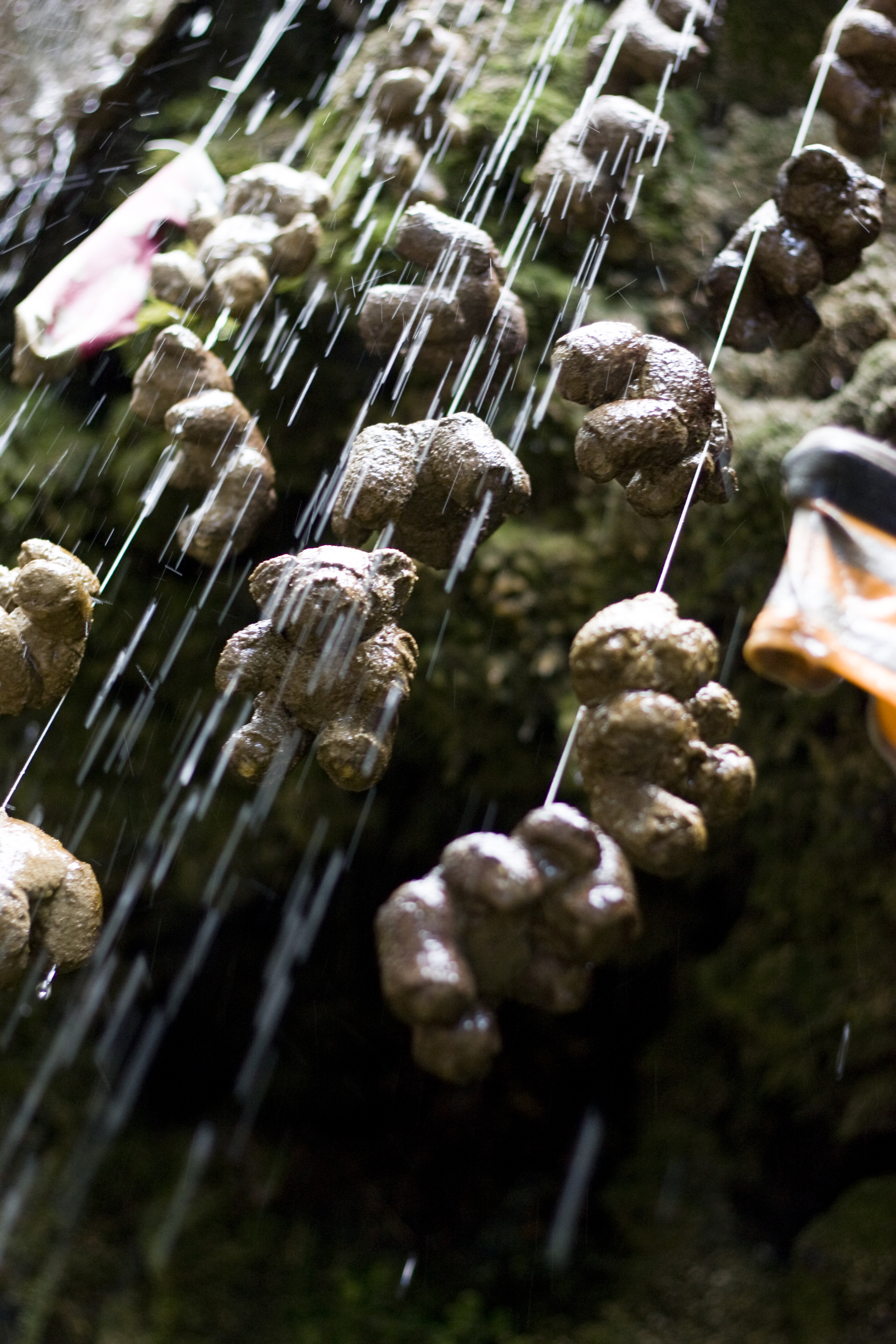
"Petrified" teddy bears in the waterfall at Mother Shipton's Cave. The steadily flowing water is rich in calcium carbonate and calcium sulfate, which crystallises on objects and gradually hardens them.

A petrifying well is a well or other body of water which gives objects a stone-like appearance. If an object is placed into such a well and left there for a period of months or years, the object acquires a stony exterior.

== Nature ==
If an object is placed into such a well and left there for a period of weeks or months the object acquires a stony exterior. At one time this property was believed to be a result of magic or witchcraft, but it is an entirely natural phenomenon and due to a process of evaporation and deposition in waters with an unusually high mineral content.

This process of petrifying is not to be confused with petrification, wherein the constituent molecules of the original object are replaced (and not merely overlaid) with molecules of stone or mineral.

== Examples ==
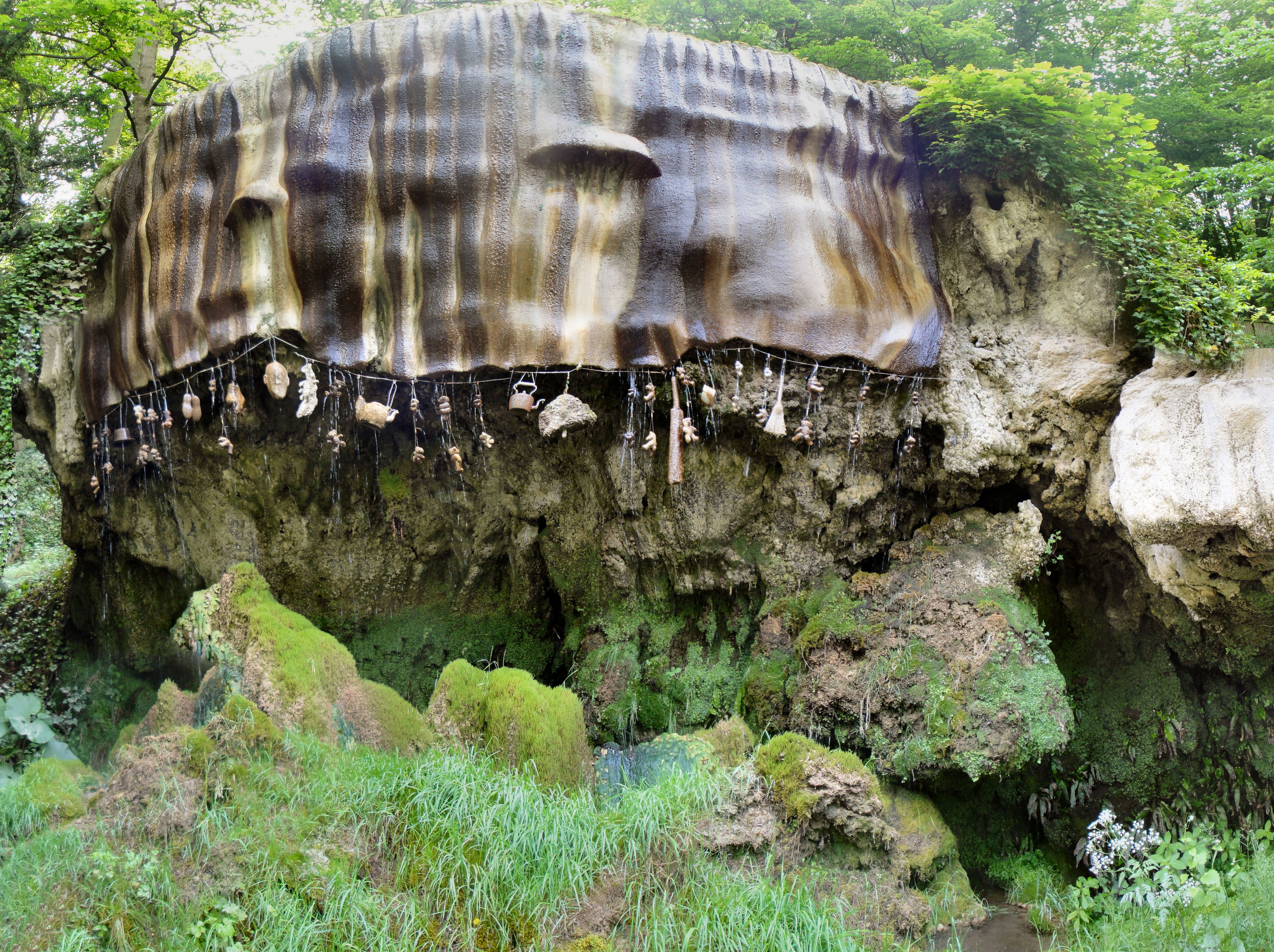
The petrifying well at Knaresborough, North Yorkshire

Notable examples of petrifying wells in England are the spring at Mother Shipton's Cave in Knaresborough and Matlock Bath, in Derbyshire. In France, some of best-known wells, such as the "petrifying fountains" of St. Alyre (Clermont-Ferrand) and Saint-Nectaire, are found in the department of Puy-de-Dome. In Ireland, such wells were noted by John Rutty on Howth Head, among other locations.

== See also ==
- Speleothem
  - Stalactite
  - Stalagmite
