= Yallery Brown =

Nature spirit in English folklore

Yallery Brown is a mischievous fairy-like nature spirit in an old Lincolnshire folk tale from England, which itself is usually named after the creature.

== Plot ==
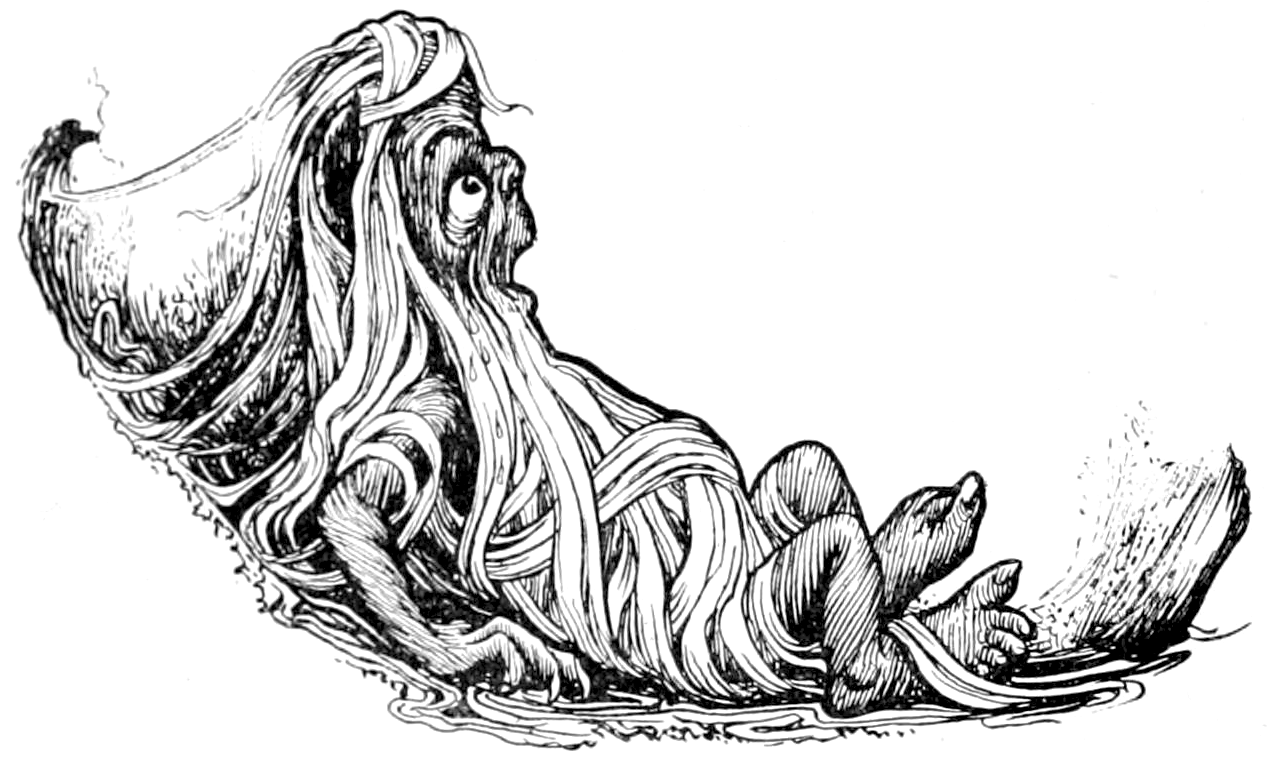
An illustration of Yallery Brown from Joseph Jacobs' More English Fairy tales.

According to Joseph Jacobs' version of the story, a young lad named Tom was sitting in a field resting during his daily labours when he heard a little whimper, like the sound of a young child in distress. Upon further investigation Tom found a little creature trapped under a flat stone. The creature was like a ragged little man and had yellow-brown skin, the colour of dark mustard. The little man begged Tom to help free him from the stone. Tom knew that he should just leave the creature where he lay, but it whimpered so much that eventually Tom took pity upon it and lifted the stone from on top of the little man. The creature jumped up in delight, introduced itself as Yallery-Brown then promised to reward Tom by granting him a wish. Being workshy, the young lad asked for help with his daily chores. Yallery-Brown clapped his hands and said it would be so. Tom thanked the creature who flew into a rage and warned that it must never be thanked or dire consequences would follow. As a parting word Yallery-Brown told Tom that if he ever needed him he was to call his name.

The next day, when Tom set about his tasks, he found that the jobs were already doing themselves. The broom was rushing around the room sweeping the floor of its own accord and the quern was grinding the corn without human assistance. After many days of the same thing happening, the people began to whisper that Tom was a witch or warlock. This worried Tom, so he called for Yallery-Brown. Tom thanked the creature for its help but told it that it was no longer needed. Yallery-Brown again flew into a rage and told Tom his help would be withdrawn, but as he had been thanked Tom would be left with a curse. The little man vanished with the words:

Wokk's tha will,

tha'll nivver do well,
Wokk's tha mowt,
tha'll nivver gain owt,
For harm an' mischance an' Yallery-Bro-wun,

Tha's let out theesen from unner the sto-wun!

In modern English, and without colloquialisms, the verse is as follows:

Work as you will,

you'll never do well,
Work as you might,
you'll never get anything,
For harm and mischance and Yallery-Brown,

You've let out yourself from under the stone!

Yallery Brown was as good as his word. Tom was plagued with bad luck and ill fortune his whole life.

This version differs marginally from the tale submitted by M. C. Balfour as being collected from a man in the Ancholme Valley of North Lincolnshire, and included in Folklore. Balfour's tale has the teller speaking in first person.

== In Collections ==
This story was first cited by M C Balfour in 1891 within a set of stories collected in the Ancholme Valley of North Lincolnshire, and published in the Folklore Society journal Folklore under the title Legends of the Lincolnshire Carrs. The story was also sent to Joseph Jacobs and included in his More English Fairy tales.

The story also appears in the anthology A Book Of Goblins edited by Alan Garner, an audiobook telling of which was recited by the actor Jules Landau.
