= Manshead CE Academy =

School in Bedfordshire, England

Manshead Church of England Academy
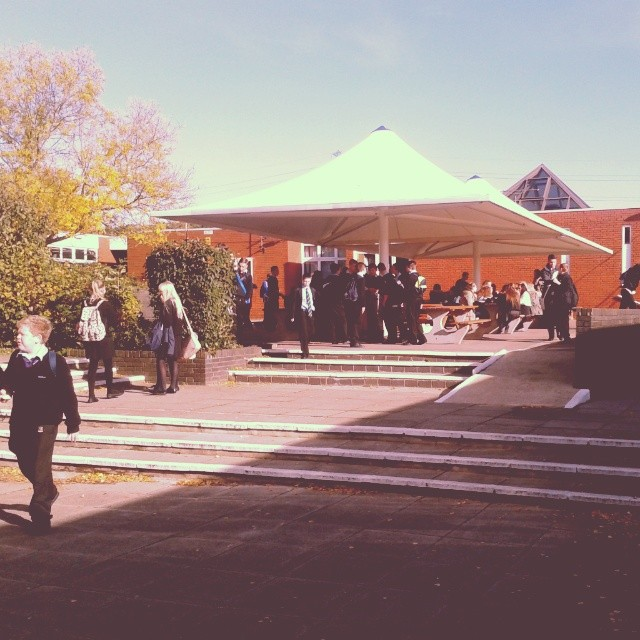
- Manshead Church of England Academy

Location
- Dunstable Road; Caddington, Bedfordshire, LU1 4BB; England; 51.872583°N 0.495611°W

Information
- Type: Sponsored academy
- Religious affiliation: Church of England
- Established: 1971 as a comprehensive upper school, 2017 as Manshead CofE Academy
- Local authority: Central Bedfordshire
- Department for Education URN: 109705 Tables
- Headteacher: Olivia Burke
- Gender: Mixed
- Age: 11 to 19
- Enrolment: 1351 As of October 2026
- Enrollment cap: Enrollment capped at 1350 students
- Website: http://www.mansheadschool.co.uk/

Manshead Church of England Academy is a mixed Church of England secondary academy and sixth form located on the outskirts of both Caddington and Dunstable in Bedfordshire, England.

The school is a member of the Diocese of St Albans Multi-Academy Trust.

The academy is the modern successor to Dunstable Grammar School, which existed from 1881 to 1971 when Bedfordshire adopted the comprehensive education system. From this time, it was an upper school educating pupils aged 13–18, with Ashton Middle School in particular acting as a feeder school to Manshead. However, in September 2014, Manshead became a full secondary school accepting pupils at age 11.

In May 2017, the school converted to a sponsored academy with the Diocese of St Albans Multi-Academy Trust.

The academy is named after the ancient Manshead Hundred which covered an area in the south-west of Bedfordshire and included Dunstable.

== Academic performance ==
In July 2026 educational watchdog Ofsted rated Manshead CE Academy as requiring urgent improvement in five aspects and needing attention in one aspect. The inspection assessed various aspects of the school's performance and found it to not be meeting good standards. The report states that many Year 11 pupils achieved well below national standards in English and Mathematics qualifications. Ofsted placed this educational institution into 'special measures' because of the inspection results.

== 2025 knife incident ==
In the afternoon on Friday 2 May 2025, police were called to the school after reports of a teenager with a knife; two individuals associated with the school were taken to the hospital with only minor injuries. The school was placed into lockdown while the teenager was detained at the school and another man was taken into custody elsewhere.

A 16-year-old boy was later charged with false imprisonment, Grievous Bodily Harm with intent and three counts of Threatening with an article with blade/point or offensive weapon on education premises.

The teenager later admitted to wounding, false imprisonment and threats with a knife.

== Notable former pupils ==
- Kevin McCloud – designer, writer and television presenter
- Tim Robinson – former cricketer and current cricket umpire

== Other secondary schools in the area ==
- All Saints Academy
- Queensbury Academy
- Priory Academy
