= Ashton Middle School =

Ashton (VA) Middle School

Location
- Bedfordshire; England; 51°53′22″N 0°31′30″W

Information
- Type: Voluntary aided middle school
- Religious affiliation: Church of England
- Established: 1973 (1887)
- Founder: Frances Ashton
- Closed: 2016
- Local authority: Central Bedfordshire
- Department for Education URN: 109714 Tables
- Ofsted: Reports
- Gender: Coeducational
- Age: 9 to 13
- Houses: Ely, York, Lincoln & Wells
- Colours: Navy blue and white
- Website: http://www.ashtonmiddleschool.co.uk/

Ashton (Church of England) Middle School was a middle school in Dunstable, Bedfordshire, England, under the Central Bedfordshire Local Education Authority.

Intake came from lower schools in the town and surrounding villages. The majority of graduates moved up to one of the upper schools in the town: All Saints Academy, Queensbury Academy or Manshead School

In August 2014 Central Bedfordshire Council made the decision to close the school in 2016.

== History ==
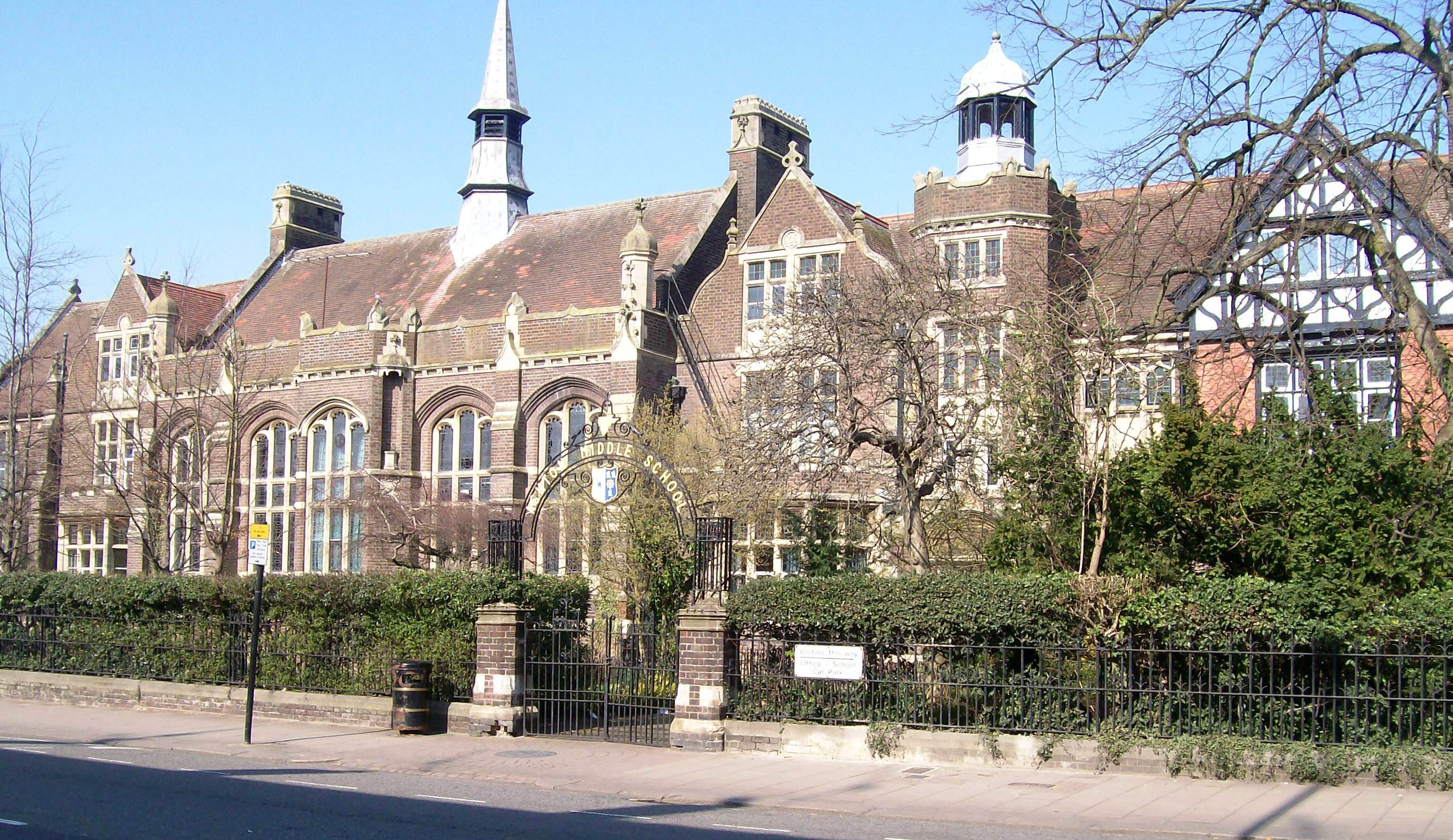
Ashton Middle School

Ashton's main building and grounds began as Dunstable Grammar School, founded by Frances Ashton in 1728 and built in 1887. It officially took on its middle school name and status in 1973.

Bedfordshire changed from a two-tier school system to a three-tier system (lower, middle and upper) in 1972, the concept of middle schools originally being mooted in the 1967 Plowden Report. At the time of closing, it was one of fewer than 200 middle schools in England.

In August 2014 Central Bedfordshire Council made the decision to close Ashton Middle School in 2016. The council claims that falling pupil numbers are making the school financially unviable, however the Church of England Diocese of St Albans is currently consulting on whether to appeal the closure. The closure of the school is part of a reorganisation of schooling in Dunstable which is expected to ultimately lead to closure of three middle schools in the area. However the school closed at the end of the Summer term in 2016.

== Facilities ==
The school had five buildings, the "A" block being the largest and oldest, situated parallel to Watling Street, mainly used for maths and French lessons and secretary duties. It also housed a matrons office, a library, the main hall and school chapel. The "B" block was primarily for the new intake form classes. The "C" block was multipurpose but included science labs and design-technology rooms. The "D" block was used for history, geography and music teaching; and the "E" block contained lockers and storage.

Other facilities included an astroturf pitch, PE block with an indoor gym, and a ball court for the children.

== School houses ==
The school had a house system named after four English cathedrals.

House	Colours
Ely	
Wells	
York	
Lincoln	

Competition between the houses included a sports day, swimming gala and merit marks, and football, hockey, cricket, rugby, tag rugby and athletics (long jump, high jump, javelin, shot put and track events). The school garden was rebuilt as a memorial to a former year 8 student, Hayley Spokes.

== Ofsted report ==
A section 5 Ofsted inspection was carried out and the report published on 16 March 2011. In the report the school was deemed "inadequate" by education watchdog Ofsted. The report stated "Significant improvement is required in relation to the progress of pupils with special educational needs and/or disabilities, and the use of assessment to provide individual pupils with appropriate guidance, challenge and support."

The Ofsted inspection of March 2012 found the school to be "satisfactory and improving, with good features".

== Closure ==
It was announced in 2014 that three local schools were to close. Ashton Middle School being one of the three. In that time school pupil numbers diminished to less than a class full during its final days. Ashton Middle School officially closed its doors and ceased to be a school on 31 August 2016. The site is now called "Ashton Grove".

== Future of Ashton ==
The site of Ashton Middle School is now a new development of 113 homes and apartments. A large proportion of the site was demolished, including C Block, B Block, Boiler house and swimming pool changing areas (Later were the Site Agents office and ICT Office).
