= Norman Morris =

Norman Frederick Morris
- Born: 26 February 1920; Luton, Bedfordshire, England
- Died: 29 February 2008 (aged 88); London, England
- Education: St Mary's Hospital Medical School
- Occupations: Academia, Obstetrics, Gynecology
- Years active: 1943–2008
- Employer: University of London
- Notable work: Human Relations in Obstetrics
- Spouse: Lucy Rivlin
- Children: 4

Norman Frederick Morris (26 February 1920 – 29 February 2008) was a British pioneer of women's health. He was a professor of obstetrics and gynaecology at Charing Cross Hospital Medical School (1958–1985) and was also a university administrator. From 1971 to 1980, he was dean of medicine, and then deputy vice-chancellor at the University of London.

Morris became known as a reforming obstetrician who emphasised a psychosomatic approach. He was a founder member in 1962 of the International Society of Psychosomatic Obstetrics and Gynaecology (ISPOG).

== Early life and education ==
Morris was born in 1920 in Luton. His father Frederick was a shop steward for NALGO; his mother Evelyn was a teacher. He was head boy of Dunstable Grammar School and was selected by Lord Moran to become a medical student at St Mary's Hospital Medical School. He qualified there in 1943, MRCS and LRCP. At St Mary's, Morris was taught and guided by the gynaecologist and medical reformer Aleck Bourne. In 1966, Morris wrote of later becoming "Aleck Bourne's house-surgeon, registrar and friend."

== Career ==
After qualification, Morris worked in Amersham and then in the East End of London. He held junior posts in obstetrics and gynaecology at St Mary's. He was first assistant at Hammersmith Hospital, where he worked from 1950 from 1952. He became reader at University College Hospital, where he was quite in sympathy with the ideas of William Nixon.

In 1957, Morris had a National Birthday Trust Fund grant to survey European maternity services. In 1958, he was appointed professor of obstetrics and gynaecology, the first clinical professor at Charing Cross Hospital.

At Charing Cross Morris developed a clinical and basic science research programme. He was the first obstetrician to introduce fathers to the labour ward. He built a labour ward without the traditional first stage and second stage rooms. According to Murray Enkin's biographer Kerreen Reiger, "Morris was a leader in implementing organisational changes to support humanistic childbirth and the first president of ISPOG.".

Staff were encouraged to attend Balint-style departmental meetings, in other words managed dialogues with caseworkers. Morris worked closely with Emmanuel Lewis, a psychiatrist and pediatrician Hugh Jolly. The first water birth was carried out at Charing Cross in the 1970s. Frédérick Leboyer came from France to work with Morris, who was also in contact with Michel Odent.

Morris retired from the National Health Service (NHS) in 1985. He became medical director of the in vitro fertilisation unit at Cromwell Hospital, where he was from 1986 and 1997. He was the director of the Commonwealth Health secretariat. At age 80, he established postgraduate courses for the MRCS and the MRCP. He continued to work until his death in 2008.

== Death ==
Norman Morris died at the Wellington Hospital, London on 29 February 2008, after a short illness. He was buried in Hoop Lane Cemetery.

His life was celebrated at the Royal College of Obstetricians on 25 September 2008; speakers included politician Tony Benn, and diplomat Emeka Anyaoku. Lucilla Poston spoke on his work as a researcher. The eulogy was read by Australian actor and comedian Barry Humphries (in the guise of Dame Edna Everage).

== Works ==
- Psychosomatic Medicine in Obstetrics and Gynaecology (3 vols., 1972–3), editor
- The Baby Book, 1972
- Sterilization as a Means of Birth Control in Men and Women, 1976, with Humphrey Arthure, a consultant obstetrician at Charing Cross Hospital
- "Contemporary Attitudes to Care in Labour", 1986, chapter in The Psychosomatic Approach: Contemporary Practice of Whole-Person Care
- Factors Influencing Population Control, 1986. In his Introduction to Mary Pollock's Family Planning: A Handbook for the Doctor (1966), referring to "many vast areas of the world that are presently stricken with poverty, famine and sickness", Morris wrote "Population control must surely be the vital first step in the relief of these social evils."

Morris's initial research interest was hypertension in pregnancy. He published a series of papers on uterine blood flow and was the first obstetrician to show that there was reduced blood flow in the uterus in women who subsequently developed pre-eclampsia.

In 1954 Morris gave a talk "Psychosomatic reactions in Obstetrics and Gynaecology", attended by William Nixon, to the Alfred Adler Medical Society in London, a group of medical practitioners. A symposium paper by Morris from the end of 1958, "A Surgeon's View of Gynaecological Disorders in General Practice", began with the words "I think it is now generally appreciated that a great number of the gynaecological symptoms of which women complain are psychogenic in origin." It followed a Royal College of Physicians conference in May of that year, on The Nature of Stress Disorder, attended by Morris, and with proceedings published by the Society for Psychosomatic Research.

A major contribution from Morris questioned standards of prenatal care. He was critical of the way that midwives and obstetricians treated women, and his work was summarized in a paper "Human Relations in Obstetric Practice" in the Lancet in 1960. This paper was based on letters from women sent to a magazine, and at the time was controversial. A correspondent in The Lancet who supported Morris was Hilda C. Abraham (1906–1971), daughter of Karl Abraham, a psychoanalyst who had background as a midwife, who contributed a case report on post-natal depression.

In the proceedings of a London conference of November 1960, Psychosomatic Disorders in Adolescents and Young Adults, Morris wrote:

From a purely physical point of view, it seems that pregnancy in girls of 15 is not so favourable, but from the age of 16 onwards young women seem to react most satisfactorily to the stress of pregnancy.

We need to know more about the emotional response to pregnancy in these young women.

Morris's promptings came at the beginning of two decades of research. In 2005, the paper was included in Vintage Papers from The Lancet, edited by Ruth Richardson.

== Interests ==
Morris was a campaigner for medical academics and established AUCAS, a pressure group that achieved parity of pay for university doctors. He set up a campaign to allow Jewish doctors from the USSR to emigrate and develop careers in the UK and Israel. He was president of the Division of the Obstetrics and Gynaecology Section at the Royal Society of Medicine and the West London Medico-Chirological Society.

As well, Morris was on the Northwest Thames Health Authority from 1974 to 1980; and was on the committee for the 1980 Flowers Report on medical education in London, chaired by Brian Flowers, Baron Flowers.

== Family ==
In 1944 Morris met Dr Benjamin Rivlin (died 1964), a GP of Stratford, London; and in 1945, he married Rivlin's daughter Lucia Xenia Rivlin (Lucy). They had four children, two sons David and Nicholas and two daughters Jackie and Vanessa. All became doctors.
