= All Saints Academy, Dunstable =

All Saints Academy Dunstable

Location
- Houghton Road; Dunstable, Bedfordshire, LU5 5AB; England; 51.897°N 0.530°W

Information
- Type: Academy
- Motto: Living Well Together with Dignity, Faith and Hope
- Religious affiliation: Church of England
- Established: 1936
- Local authority: Central Bedfordshire
- Department for Education URN: 135946 Tables
- Ofsted: Reports
- Principal: Elizabeth Furber
- Gender: Mixed
- Age: 11 to 18
- Houses: Courage, Determination, Excellence, Inspiration, Respect
- Colours: Pink, Orange, Green
- Website: http://www.allsaintsacademydunstable.org/

All Saints Academy (formerly The Northfields Technology College) is a co-ed secondary school located in Dunstable, Bedfordshire, England.

All Saints educates 11- to 16-year-olds, as well as mainly from the town of Dunstable and some surrounding villages. In addition, the school offers further education for 16- to 18-year-olds through its sixth form department.

== History ==
The school was launched under the direction of Frank Underwood on 14 January 1936, with 336 students. It was then known as Northfields Senior Elementary School. As a consequence of the Education Act 1944, Northfields then became a secondary modern school.

Following the 1967 Plowden Report, Bedfordshire LEA decided to implement the three-tier education system of lower, middle and upper schools in the county. By the end of the 1970s, Northfields was redesignated as a comprehensive upper school.

The school was among the first to operate a farm on site, with children looking after the animals, under Mr Jones (Science teacher) advice. There was a barn for caged chickens, calves & food stock. In outside pens were pigs, cows & chickens, eggs were collected & either hatched in an incubator in the technicians room or sold, the pigs & cows went through a full life cycle before entering the food chain. A part of the farm was given over to crops and farming methods. The farm lost importance in the early-1970s when part of the land was taken for the new sports hall & Mr Jones left, as a result the farm lost its viability. Head Master at the time was Mr David Fone, Deputy Head Mrs Baines.

In the early 1980s under David Fone, the school took part in an experiment to promote the use of computers in schools and as a result received special funding which paid for BBC Model B computers in almost every classroom and every subject. The computers were linked by an early form of network. Some homework was done on computer and saved on network directories. There was also an attempt to fully computerise the school records. As a result of this David Fone received an OBE in 1989.

The school went through a period of decline, and was put into special measures in the early 2000s. However the school improved, and was renamed The Northfields Technology College after the school gained specialist status as a technology college.

The Northfields Technology College closed on 31 August 2009. It reopened the next day as the new All Saints Academy. The school now specialises in Science and Business, and relocated to a new multi-million pound purpose-built school on the same site in 2012.

All Saints is sponsored by the St Albans Diocese of the Church of England and the University of Bedfordshire. Manshead CE Academy in Caddington is also sponsored by the Church of England, and objections were made at the time about possible religious influences on education in Dunstable as a whole (Queensbury Academy is the only secondary school not be linked to the Church in Dunstable).

In 2014 the school started to admit pupils from the age of 11, becoming a secondary school. In 2015 the academy received an Inadequate Ofsted rating and has been placed in special measures. The principal, Tom Waterworth resigned and Mrs Furber has taken over management of the school.

More recently, in 2023, the school received another inadequate rating from Ofsted. In 2024, Ofsted recognised substantial progress in all areas, however the quality of education still 'requires improvement'.

== Notable former pupils ==
- Faye Tozer, a theatre actress and singer who first gained fame as a member of the pop group Steps
