= Dunstable Grammar School =

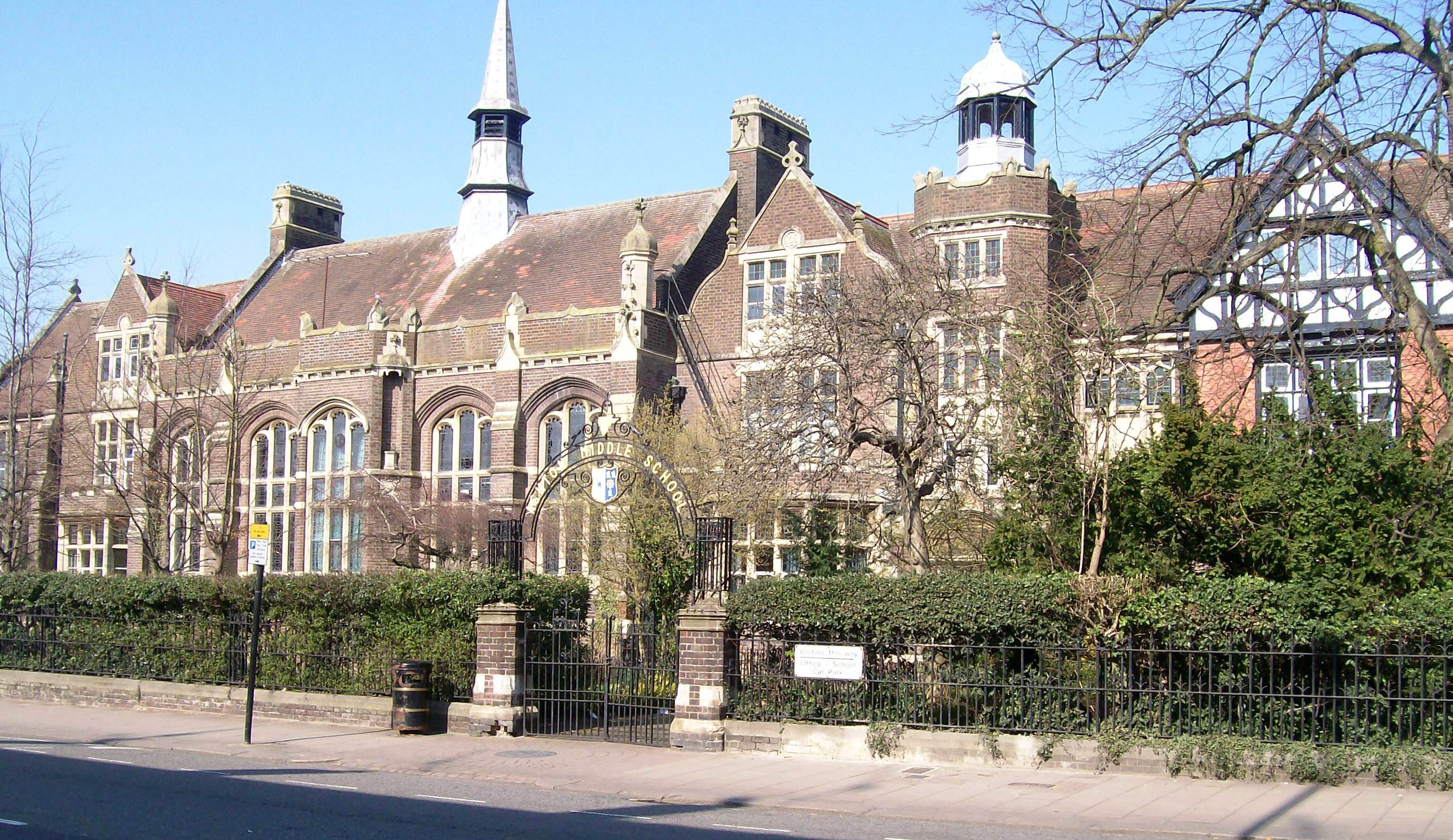
- Dunstable Grammar School buildings, later used by Ashton Middle School
- Dunstable, Bedfordshire; England

Information
- School type: Grammar School
- Established: 1888
- Closed: 1971

Dunstable Grammar School was a grammar school in the market town of Dunstable, Bedfordshire, England. Opened in 1888, it was closed in 1971.

The site is now home to residential flats and apartments.

== Foundation ==
Dunstable Grammar School was established by the Trustees of the Almshouse Charity created by the Will of Frances Ashton. Hence the inscription on the building which says:

Dunstable Grammar School Founded A.D. 1728 By Mrs. Frances Ashton Built A.D. 1887.

== Construction ==
New school buildings were constructed in 1887 on the northern side of Dunstable for the Trustees of Frances Ashton's charity, and in 1888 the school opened with 49 pupils. The first headmaster was L. C. R. Thring, of the Thring family of Uppingham which included the educationist Edward Thring (1821–1887), headmaster of Uppingham School. By 1917, the school had grown to 67 boarders and 100 day boys. A school library was built in memory of the former pupils who died in the Boer War and the Second World War, and a memorial in the library commemorated the names of the sixty-two boys who gave their lives, including Ashton Edward Thring, the only son of the school's first headmaster. and the Victoria Cross winner, Lieutenant-Colonel Edward Henderson.

== Closure ==
The school remained in its purpose-built home from 1888 until 1971, when it was closed with the coming of the new comprehensive system of education. The remaining schoolteachers and pupils moved to a new school at the opposite end of the town, the Manshead Upper School (now Manshead CE Academy).

== Use of the buildings ==
The original Grammar School building was modernised and since 1973 has housed the Ashton Middle School, for children aged nine to thirteen.

== Notable former pupils ==
- Mike Bannister, commanded the final Concorde commercial flight from New York to London, 24 October 2003
- Nigel Benson, author, Dunstable in Detail is a standard reference for the town and includes details about the Grammar School
- Richard Cabut
- Gary Cooper, (known as Frank Cooper while at school), actor and starred in many Hollywood films, e.g. High Noon (1952)
- Graeme Paul Knowles, Dean of St Paul's from 2007 to 2011
- Sam Kydd, actor who appeared in many films and on TV (e.g. as Mr Walton in the UK soap-opera Crossroads)
- Kevin McCloud, TV presenter, Grand Designs
- Alfred Morcom (1885–1952), cricketer and medical doctor
- Norman Morris (1920–2008), professor of medicine and humanitarian who revolutionized maternity care in the UK
- Khawaja Nazimuddin, second Prime Minister of Pakistan (1951–1953), visited his old school dormitory in 1952
- William Willis, Liberal MP for Colchester from 1880 to 1885
