= Alfred Morcom =

English cricketer and medical doctor

Personal information
- Full name: Alfred Farr Morcom
- Born: 16 February 1885; Dunstable, Bedfordshire, England
- Died: 12 February 1952 (aged 66); Westminster, London, England
- Batting: Right-handed
- Bowling: Right-arm fast-medium

Domestic team information
- Years: Team
- 1904–1914: Bedfordshire
- 1905–1907: Cambridge University
- 1911: Marylebone Cricket Club

Career statistics
Competition	First-class
Matches	23
Runs scored	257
Batting average	11.68
100s/50s	0/0
Top score	29
Balls bowled	4,818
Wickets	97
Bowling average	23.93
5 wickets in innings	5
10 wickets in match	1
Best bowling	7/76
Catches/stumpings	10/–
- Source: Cricinfo, 28 July 2019

Alfred Farr Morcom (16 February 1885 – 12 February 1952) was an English first-class cricketer and medical doctor. He played first-class cricket on 23 occasions between 1905 and 1911, twenty of which came for Cambridge University, in addition to playing for the Marylebone Cricket Club. He also played cricket at minor counties level for Bedfordshire. His medical career spanned over thirty years, during which he assisted the Royal Army Medical Corps in the First World War. His medical career ended upon his death in 1952.

== Early life and first-class cricket ==
The son of Dr. Augustus Morcom and his wife, Alice Farr, he was born at Dunstable in February 1885. He was educated at Dunstable Grammar School and Repton School, before going up to Clare College, Cambridge to study medicine. While at Cambridge, he made his debut in first-class cricket for Cambridge University against Warwickshire at Fenner's in 1905. He made seven first-class appearances for Cambridge in 1905, in addition to representing the Gentlemen in the Gentlemen v Players fixture. He played first-class cricket for Cambridge until 1907, making a total of twenty appearances. A right-arm fast-medium bowler, he formed a formidable bowling partnership with Guy Napier and Percy May, taking 85 wickets for Cambridge, at an average of 23.77. He took four five-wicket hauls and once took ten wickets in a match, with his best innings being 6 for 25 against Northamptonshire in 1906. His final appearance in 1907 came for the Gentlemen of the South against the Players of the South in 1907, a match in which he took his career best figures of 7 for 76. In addition to first-class cricket, Morcom also played minor counties cricket for Bedfordshire between 1904–14, making 61 appearances.

== Medical career and WWI service ==
After graduating from Cambridge, he underwent medical training at St Thomas' Hospital. He became a member of the Royal College of Physicians after completing his licentiate in 1911. In that same year he made his final appearance in first-class cricket, playing for the Marylebone Cricket Club against Cambridge University at Lord's. He returned to his hometown in 1910, where he worked as a general practitioner until 1916. From 1916, he served in First World War with the Royal Army Medical Corps, holding the rank of lieutenant in April 1917. He was made a temporary captain in April 1918, before relinquishing his commission but retaining the rank of captain following the conclusion of the war. He returned to London in 1920, later holding the position of senior anesthetist at the Belgrave Hospital for Children. Prior to this he had held positions of medical officer at St Thomas', a house surgeon on septic and infection wards and a clinical assistant on ear, nose and throat wards. Morcom was the medical referee to the Cricketers' Friendly Society, as well as the president of the Harvey Society. He died at Westminster in February 1952. He was survived by his wife and two sons.
