= Sally the Dunstable Witch =

English myth

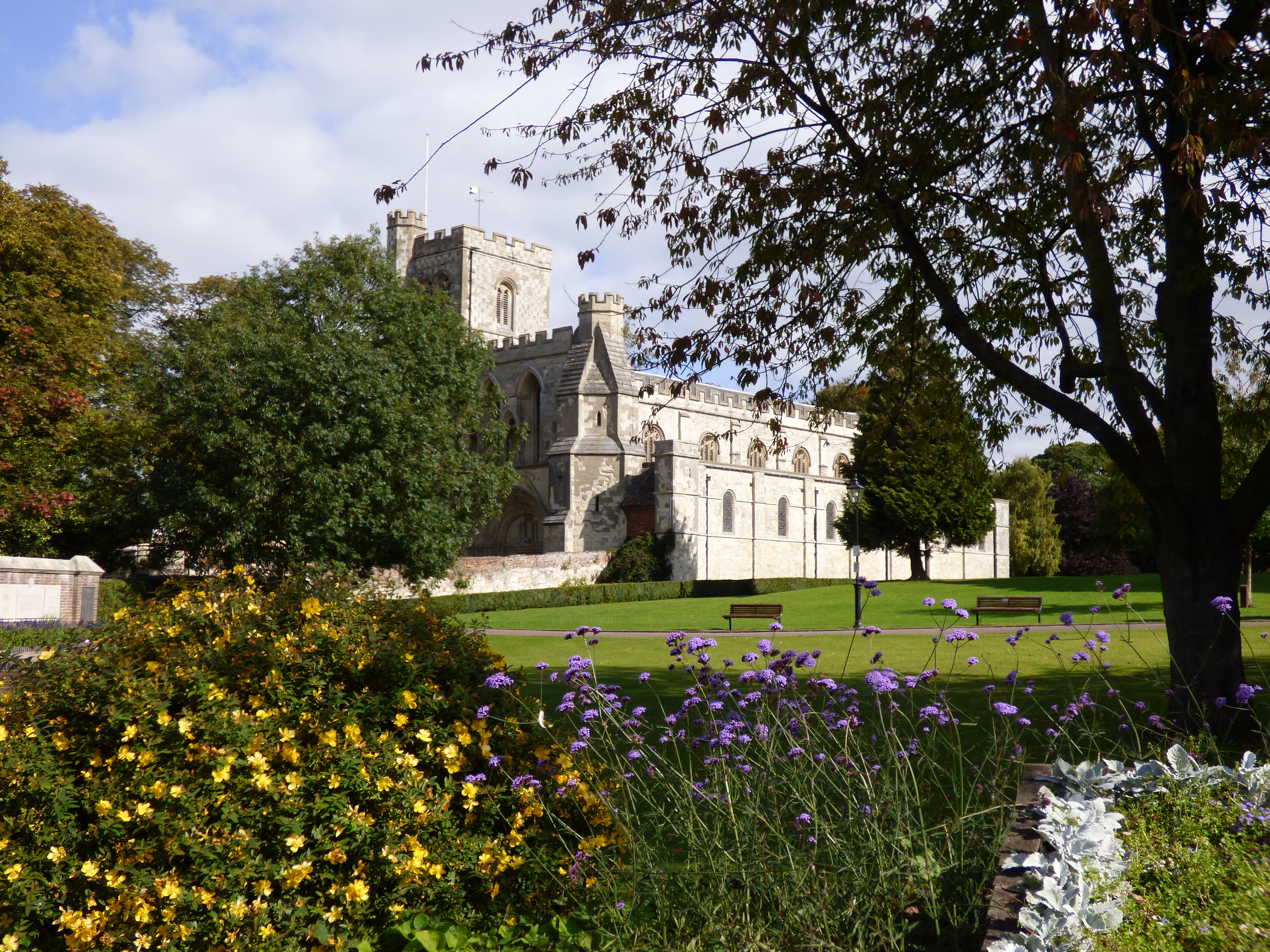
Dunstable's St. Peter's Priory Church

Sally The Dunstable Witch is a hoax and myth which has been around since the late 19th century, about an elderly woman named Sally who lived in Dunstable, Bedfordshire. She was allegedly a little old lady living alone with her cat, who turned to the dark arts. Sally The Dunstable Witch was the invention of local headmaster Alfred Philip Wire who was trying to shame the vicar into tidying up the churchyard. He penned an 81-verse poem in 1875 about the Dunstable she-devil which became very popular, but which ultimately led to him having to resign.

== Mythology ==
The myth of Sally The Dunstable Witch originated after an 81-verse poem was written about her in the late 19th century. She was allegedly a little old lady living alone with her cat, who turned to the dark arts when anyone crossed her. She was eventually burned at the stake but died cursing loudly threatening her revenge.

Her avenging spirit terrified everyone in the church and an exorcist was called in. He backed her into a corner and got her into a bottle, which was then buried. It later turned out that the story had been invented by the local headmaster, who was trying to shame the then rector into clearing up the churchyard. Rumour has it that a ‘witch’s grave’ is in the churchyard complete with a spy hole in the gravestone.

== See also ==
- Siren (mythology)
- Sea monster
- Mermaid
- Sailors' superstitions
- Kelpie
- Mami Wata
- Undine
- Oceanid
- Nereid
- Rusalka
- Ceasg
- Melusine
- Finfolk
- Selkie
- Jengu
- Neck (water spirit)
- Ningyo
- Merrow
- Hag
- Crone
- Fairy
- Asrai
- Amabie
- Morgen (mythological creature)
