= William Nixon =

William, Willie, or Bill Nixon may refer to:

- William Charles Wallace Nixon (1903 - 1966), professor of obstetrics and gynaecology, london
- William Nixon (minister) (1803-1900), Moderator of the General Assembly of the Free Church of Scotland
- William M. Nixon (1814–1893), English Australian gunmaker
- William Penn Nixon (1832–1912), American publisher
- William Nixon (architect) (1859-1931), Australian architect in New South Wales
- William Glennie Nixon (1881–?), Canadian farmer
- Bill Nixon (William John Nixon, 1886–1916), English footballer
- Willie Nixon (1916–?), American baseball player
