= Dunstable =

Market town and civil parish in Bedfordshire, England

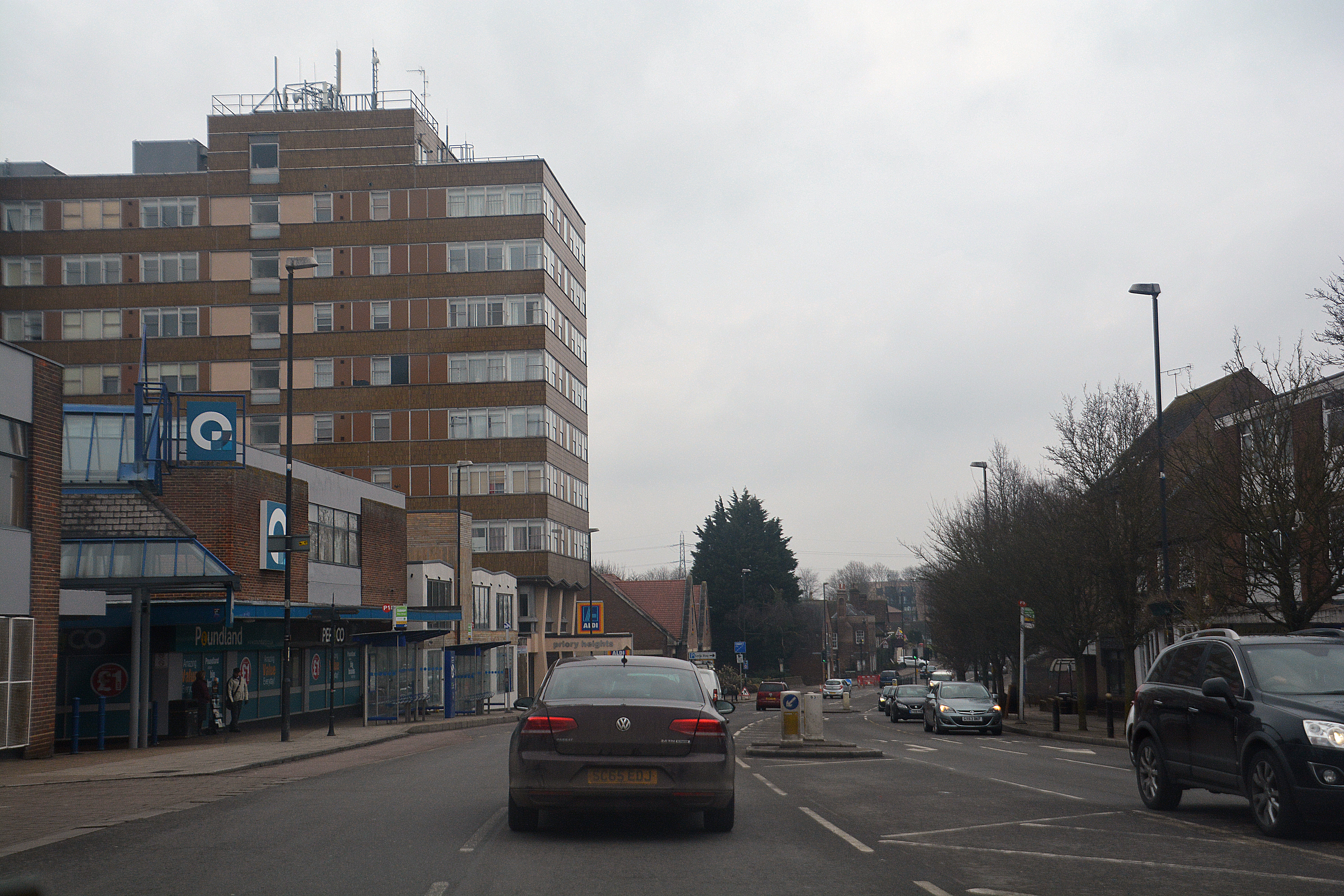
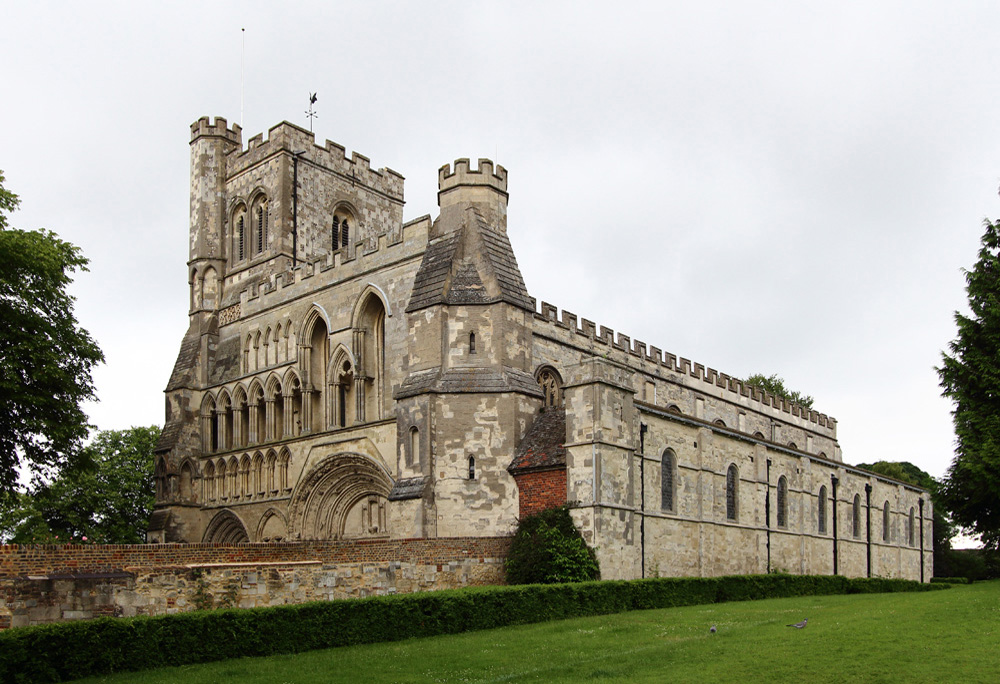
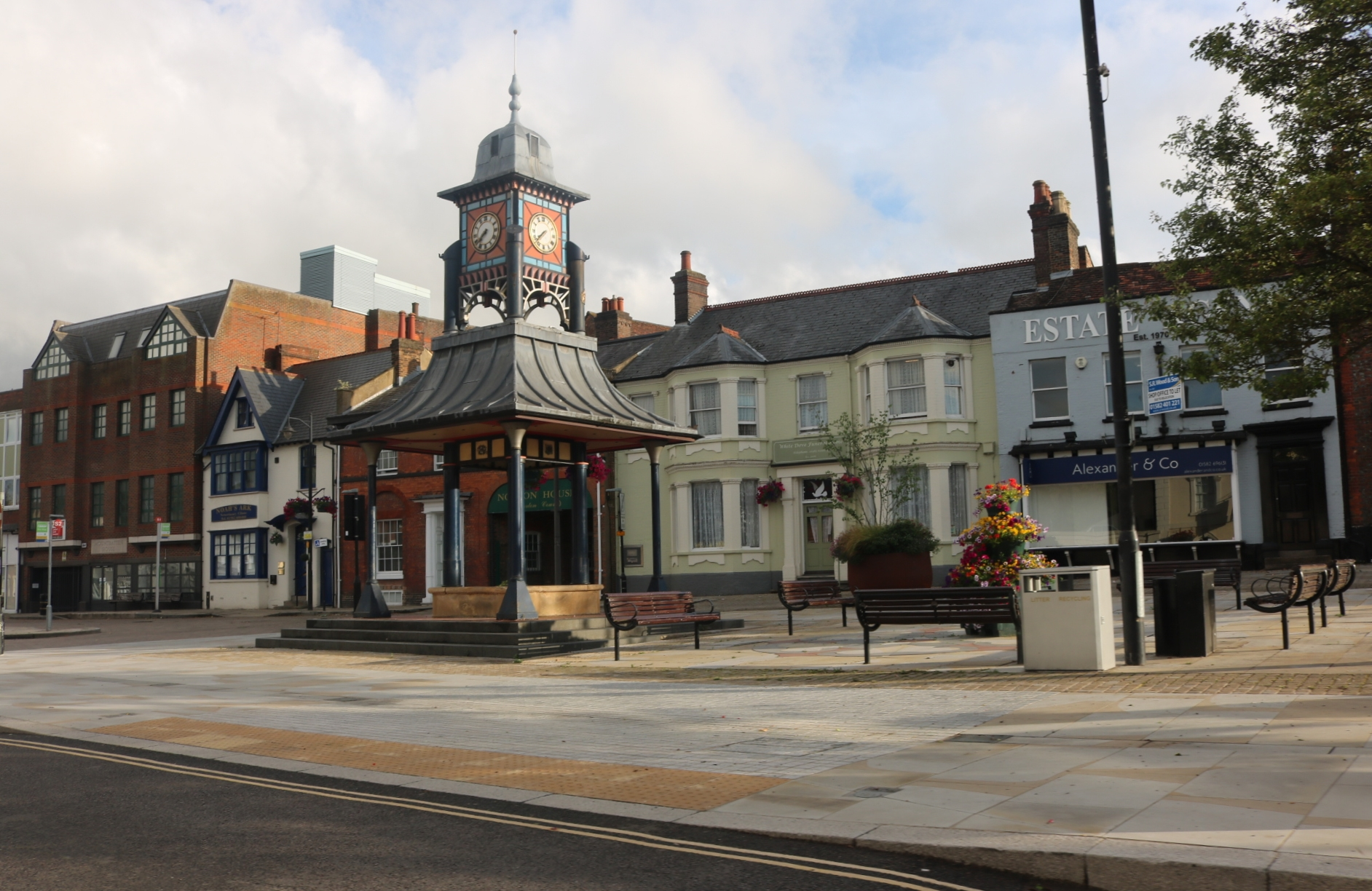
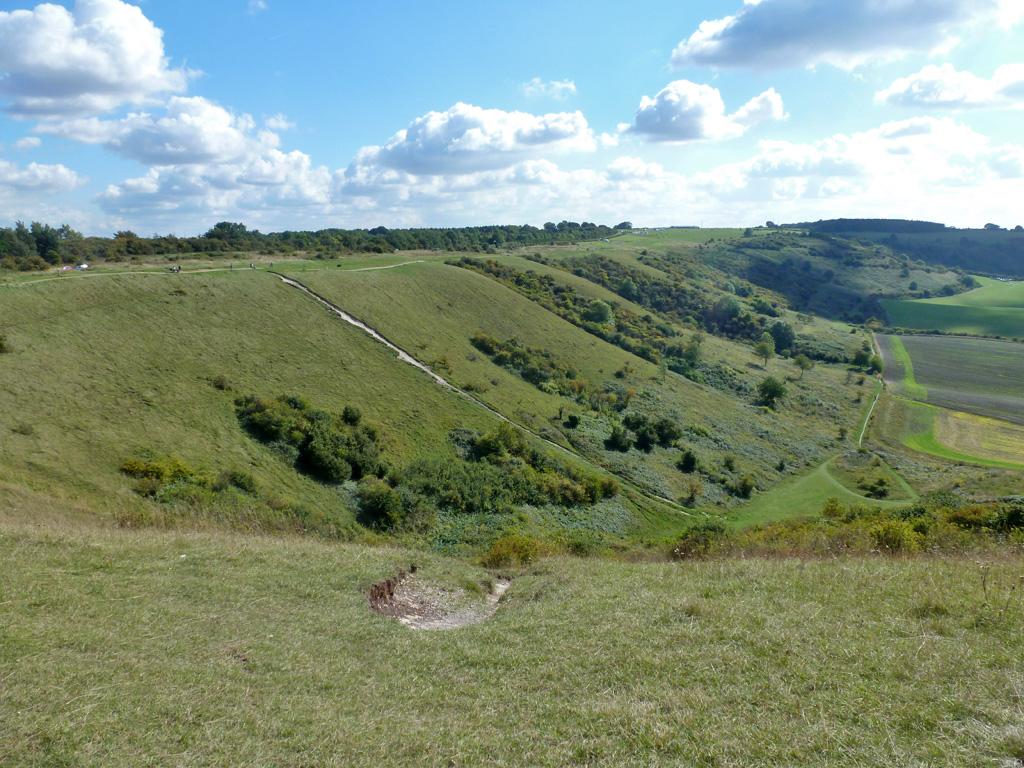
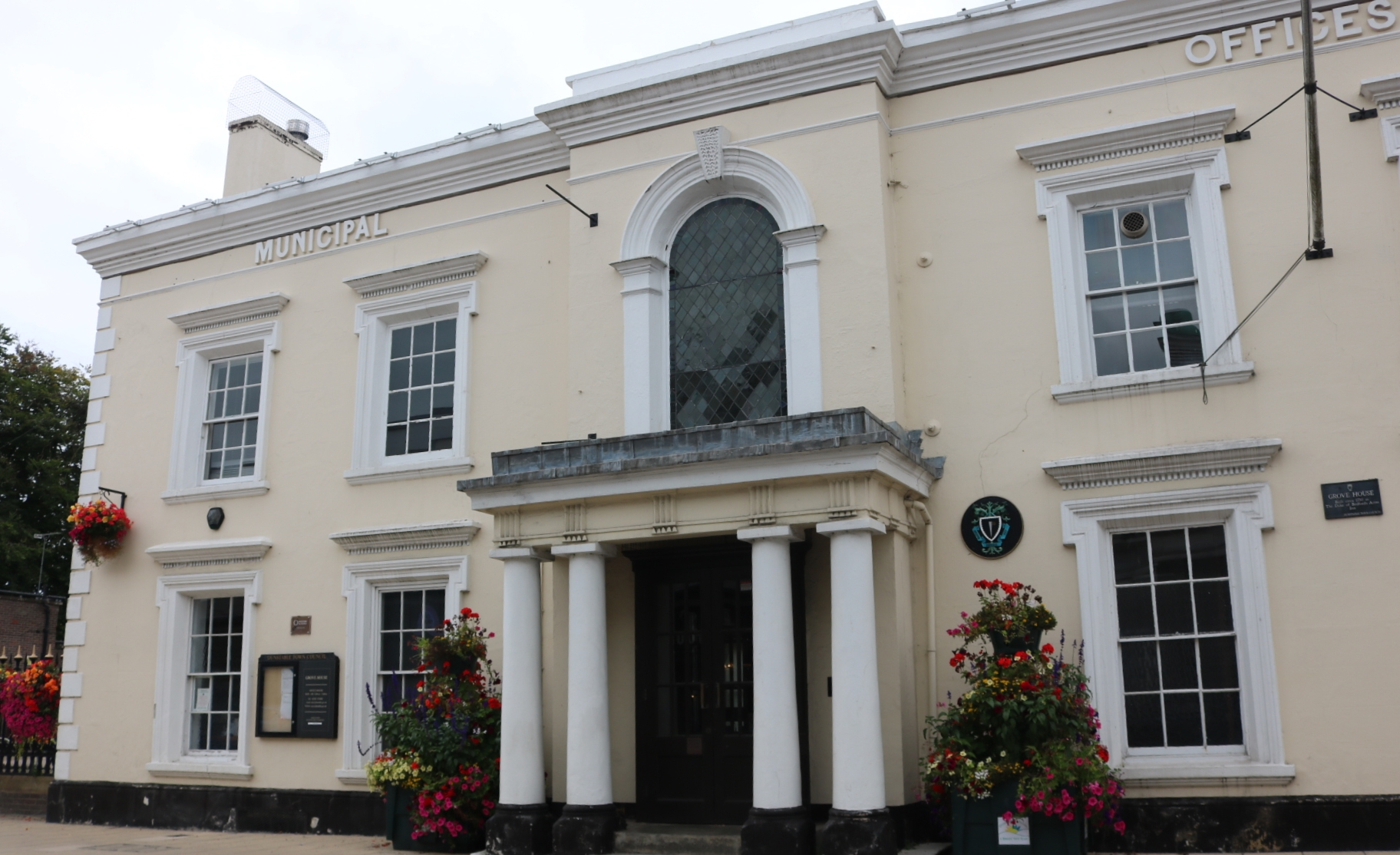
- Church Street Dunstable Priory The Market Cross & Clock Tower The Downs Grove House

- Location within Bedfordshire
- Population: 40,699
- OS grid reference: TL0121
- Civil parish: Dunstable
- Unitary authority: Central Bedfordshire
- Ceremonial county: Bedfordshire
- Region: East
- Country: England
- Sovereign state: United Kingdom
- Post town: DUNSTABLE
- Postcode district: LU5, LU6
- Dialling code: 01582
- Police: Bedfordshire
- Fire: Bedfordshire
- Ambulance: East of England
- UK Parliament: Dunstable and Leighton Buzzard

Dunstable (/ˈdʌnstəbəl/ DUN-stə-bəl) is a market town and civil parish in Bedfordshire, England, east of the Chiltern Hills, 30 miles (50 kilometres) north of London. There are several steep chalk escarpments, most noticeable when approaching Dunstable from the north. Dunstable is the fourth largest town in Bedfordshire and along with Houghton Regis forms the westernmost part of the Luton/Dunstable urban area.

== Etymology ==
In Roman times there was a minor settlement called Durocobrivis in the area now occupied by modern-day Dunstable.

There was a general assumption that the nominative form of the name had been Durocobrivae, so that is what appears on the map of 1944 illustrated below. But current thinking is that the form Durocobrivis, which occurs in the Antonine Itinerary, is a fossilised locative that was used all the time and Ordnance Survey now uses this form.

There are several theories concerning its modern name:

- Legend tells that the lawlessness of the time was personified in a thief called Dun. Wishing to capture Dun, the King stapled his ring to a post daring the robber to steal it. It was, and was subsequently traced to the house of the widow Dun. Her son, the robber, was taken and hanged to the final satisfaction that the new community bore his name.
- It comes from the Anglo-Saxon for "the boundary post of Duna".
- Derived from Dunum, or Dun, a hill, and Staple, a marketplace.

== History ==
Watling Street north of St Albans. The map shows the Roman towns established along Watling Street by the end of the first century AD.

=== Ancient history ===
Relics of Palæolithic humans, including such relics as flint implements and the bones of contemporary wild animals, suggest the settlement is prehistoric. Traces of Neolithic activity are not in doubt but much of their mystery may be lost under the surrounding Chiltern Hills. At Maiden Bower in the parish of Houghton Regis to the north, there is an Iron Age hill fort, which is clearly marked on the Ordnance survey maps. Maiden Bower has some of the ramparts showing through the edge of an old chalk quarry at Sewell where remains of an older Bronze Age fort exist. There are many prehistoric sites in the area and Dunstable is on the route of the Icknield Way, claimed to be 'the oldest road in Britain'.

=== Roman settlement ===
A settlement was established by the AD 40s and 50s, when the Romans arrived and paved the road now known as Watling Street and its crossroad, the Icknield Way. The Romans built a posting station and probably named the settlement Durocobrivis (as noted in the Etymology section above). The area was occupied by Saxons around AD 571.

=== Medieval times ===
Dunstable's modern structure dates back to Anglo-Saxon times, as do many of the nearby towns/villages. The etymology of Dunstable, akin to Luton, Houghton Regis, Totternhoe, Kensworth, Caddington, Toddington, Leighton Buzzard, etc. is Anglo-Saxon in origin, and believed to mean "Dun's market", "Downs' market" (i.e. market near the downs or hills), or "Dun's post/pole". There is no firm date as to the founding of Dunstable. However, it's possible that once the early Anglo-Saxon settled in the area, and had subdued local Romano-Britons, Dunstable along with its adjacent communities was founded between the 6th-8th centuries. During the Heptarchy period, what was to become Bedfordshire was part of the Kingdom of Mercia. This area of southern Bedfordshire was near the Danelaw boundary (the river Lea running through Luton), though within the territory ruled by King Alfred the Great in his treaty with the Norse Lord Guthrum.

There were raids by Norsemen, who had settled in Bedford and further north in Northampton and up to the Leicester/Rutland regions, for cattle, crops, slaves, and other items, which were often repelled by local Anglo-Saxon forces. One such raid occurred in 912, where Norse jarls from the East Midlands arranged raids of what is now southern Bedfordshire, including the Luton and Dunstable areas. However, Norse activity in the area was subdued after the Anglo-Saxon victory at the Battle of Tempsford, believed to have been fought further north in the county. Bedfordshire and by extension the Dunstable area was affected by later Norse raids, under Kings Sweyn Forkbeard and Cnut of Denmark, in response to the St. Bride's Massacre executed by King Athelred the Unready of England. From 1002, (the date of the Massacre) to 1016 (the accession of Cnut as King of England), the Anglo-Saxon Chronicle states that Bedfordshire was heavily affected by Norse harrying.

At the time of the Norman Conquest in 1066, this area of the county is known to have been uncultivated tract covered by woodlands. In 1109, Henry I started a period of activity by responding to this danger to travellers. He instructed areas to be cleared and encouraged settlers with offers of royal favour. In 1123, a royal residence was built at what is now called the Royal Palace Lodge Hotel on Church Street. The king used the residence as a base to hunt on nearby lands.

Dunstable Priory was founded in 1131 by Henry I who transferred land from the Parish of Houghton Regis, and it was here that the annulment of Henry VIII's and Catherine of Aragon's marriage would be confirmed years later, which led to the establishment of the Church of England in opposition to the Roman Catholic Church. The same year the town granted a town charter to the power of the priors.

In 1290, Dunstable was one of twelve sites to erect an Eleanor cross recognising Eleanor of Castile, wife of Edward I, whose coffin was laid close to the crossroads for the local people to mourn the dead Queen. The coffin was then guarded inside the priory by the canons overnight before continuing on to St. Albans. The original wooden cross has long since perished but a modern memorial remains.

During the Invasion of England of 1326, Queen Isabella of France and her army, having landed in Suffolk, captured Dunstable on 7 October without a fight.

=== 17th century ===
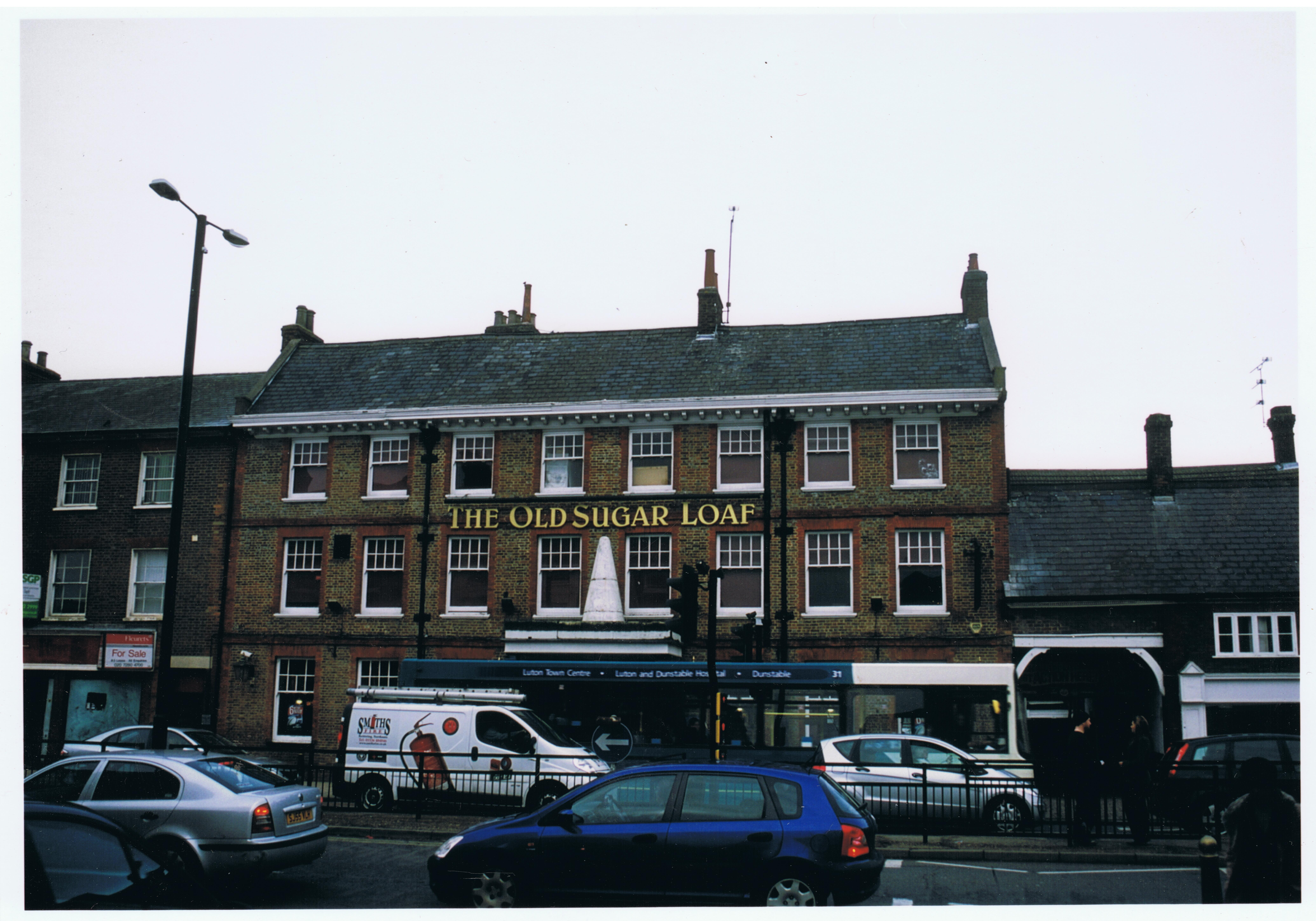
The Sugar Loaf coaching inn or public house, 2011.

Bedfordshire was one of the counties that largely supported the Roundheads during the English Civil War. Nearby St Albans in Hertfordshire was the headquarters of the Roundheads, and troops were occasionally stationed at Dunstable. The town was plundered by King Charles I's soldiers when passing through in June 1644, and Essex's men destroyed the Eleanor cross.

The town's prosperity, and the large number of inns or public houses in the town, is partly because it is only one or two days' ride by horse from London (32 miles (51 km)), and therefore a place to rest overnight. There are two pubs which still have coaching gates to the side: the Sugar Loaf in High Street North, and the Saracen's Head in High Street South. The Saracen's Head is a name often given to pubs frequented by knights of the crusades. It is positioned considerably lower than the road to its front, witness to the fact that the road has been resurfaced a number of times during the lifetime of the pub.

=== 19th century ===
Dunstable's first railway opened in 1848, originally in Houghton Regis. It was a branch joining the West Coast Main Line at Leighton Buzzard. A second line linking Dunstable with Hatfield via Luton opened in 1858. Passenger services to Dunstable were withdrawn in 1965, but the line between Dunstable and Luton remained open for freight traffic for many years.

Dunstable was a significant market town, but its importance diminished as the neighbouring town of Luton grew.

=== 20th century ===
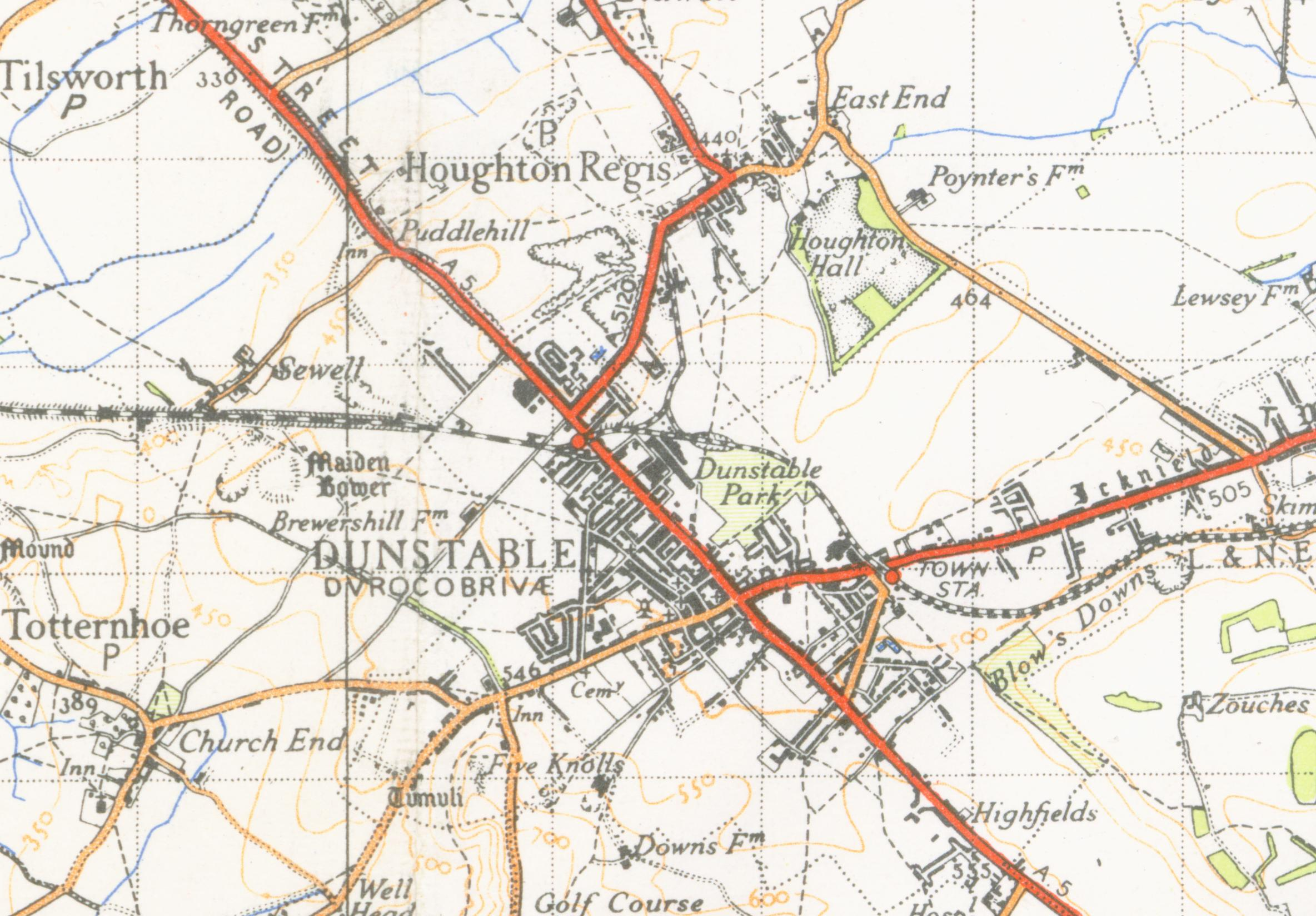
A map of Dunstable from 1944

The 19th century saw the straw hat making industry come to Luton and a subsequent decline in Dunstable, to be replaced in the early 20th century by the printing and motor vehicle industries, with companies such as Waterlow's and Vauxhall Motors respectively. The new Bedford Dunstable plant came into production in 1942 to support the British Army in the Second World War. It continued manufacturing commercial trucks and buses until 1992. The closure of the main factories and the decline of manufacturing in the area has led to this distinctiveness being lost.

Shops were concentrated along High Street North/South (Watling Street) and in 1966 the Quadrant Shopping Centre opened. During the 1980s, Dunstable town centre was a successful shopping centre featuring major retailers including Sainsbury's, Tesco, Waitrose, Bejam/Iceland, Boots, Halfords, Co-op department store, Argos, Woolworths, Burton, Next and many independent specialist shops including Moore's of Dunstable. These attracted shoppers from outlying villages resulting in a retail town centre larger than would be supportable by Dunstable residents alone, so much so that in 1985 the Eleanor's Cross retail area was developed to cater mainly for smaller shops.

The Cottage Garden Flower Shop of Chiltern Road, established in 1898, is believed to be the oldest independent retail business still trading.

=== 21st century ===
As with many other market towns, the rise of out-of-town retail parks contributed to a decline in town centre trade; Sainsbury's, Tesco, Halfords, and Next moved to newer larger premises out-of-town.

More recently, major grocery retailers Asda and Aldi have opened stores within the town centre. Whitbread PLC, which manages Premier Inn, Beefeater, Brewers Fayre and Table Table, is headquartered on the Houghton Regis/Dunstable industrial estate.

== Governance ==
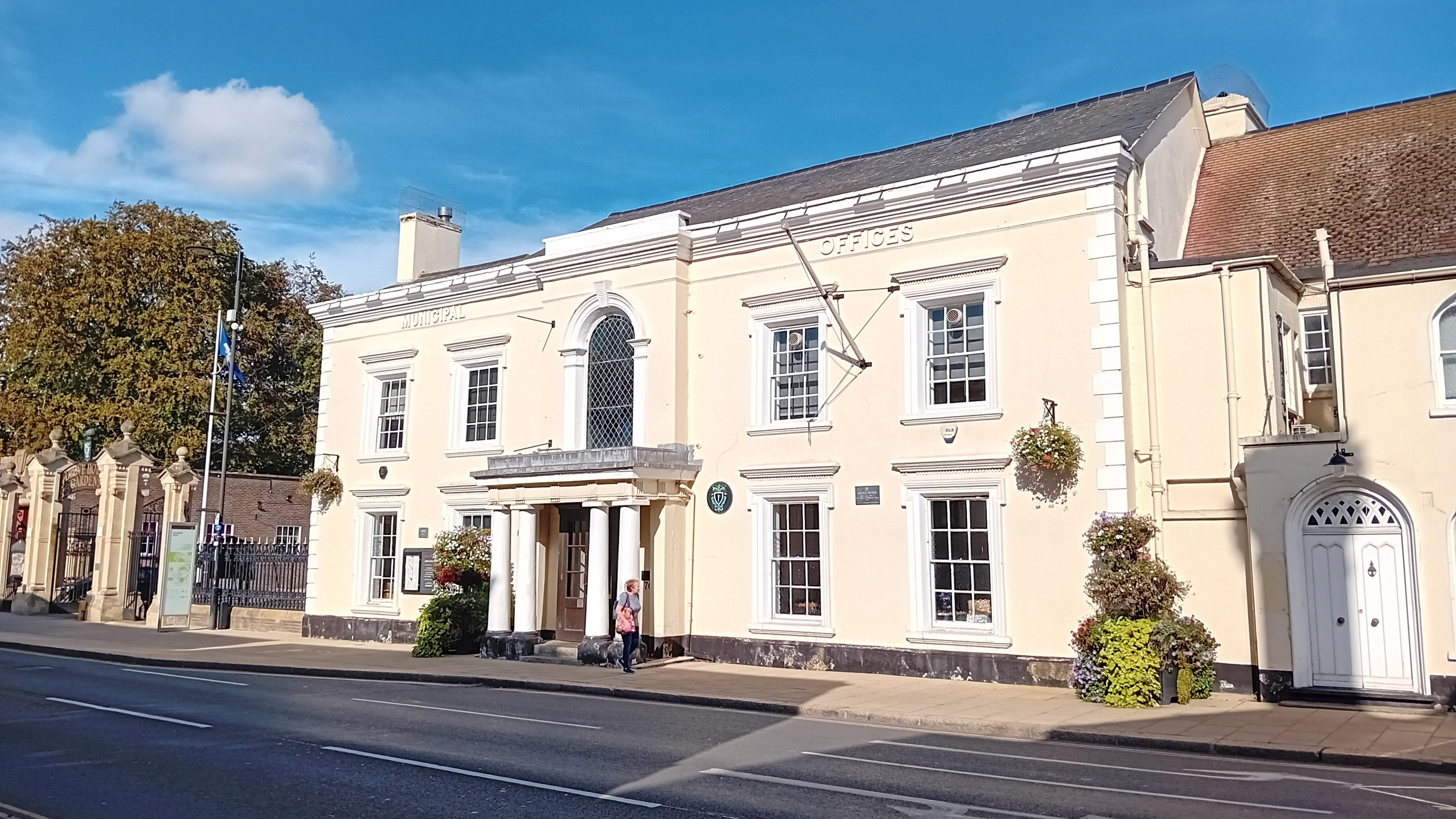
Grove House: Town Council's headquarters

There are two tiers of local government covering Dunstable, at parish (town) and unitary authority level: Dunstable Town Council and Central Bedfordshire Council. The town council has its offices at Grove House, 76 High Street North.

Dunstable is served by the Bedfordshire Police force where the Police and Crime Commissioner is John Tizard.

=== Administrative history ===
Dunstable had been an ancient borough between the 12th and 16th centuries, but lost its borough status following the English Reformation. In 1863 the parish of Dunstable was made a local government district, governed by a local board. One of the new board's first acts was to petition for the town to be made a borough again. The petition was successful and in 1864 the parish became the Municipal Borough of Dunstable. The municipal borough was abolished in 1974, becoming part of South Bedfordshire, which was in turn replaced by Central Bedfordshire in 2009. Between 1974 and 1985 Dunstable was an unparished area, directly administered by South Bedfordshire District Council. A new civil parish of Dunstable was created in 1985, with its council taking the name Dunstable Town Council.

== Geography ==
The oldest part of the town is along the Icknield Way and Watling Street where they cross. These roads split the rest of the town into four quadrants which have each been developed in stages.

The northwest quadrant started to be developed in the 19th century when the British Land Company laid out the roads around Victoria Street. The development of the Beecroft area began with the houses around Worthington Road; after the Second World War the borough council extended the estate up to Westfield Road with its shops, and then up to Aldbanks. The war-time site of the Meteorological Office, was then in Houghton Regis, where Cookfield Close and Weatherby stand. The site was redeveloped by George Wimpey Homes and others. At the north of the town there is an estate originally marketed as French's Gate Estate, and at the west of the town there is an area of houses on Lancot Hill.

The southwest quadrant has largely been developed since the Second World War. There are three main estates. In the Lake District Estate all the streets are named after places in the Lake District and Cumbria; the estate includes a parade of shops on Langdale Road. It was originally called the Croft Golf Course Estate and was built by Laing Homes. Oldhill Down Estate around the Lowther Road shops was developed by William Old Ltd., and the Stipers Hill Estate around Seamons Close was initially created by the Land Settlement Association.

In the southeast quadrant, the area around Great Northern Road was developed at the end of the 19th century as Englands Close Estate and Borough Farm Estate. The Downside Estate including the shops on Mayfield Road was planned by the borough council in 1951.

The northeast quadrant is a mainly commercial and civic area, the result of redevelopment in the early 1960s. The site of Waterlow's printing works around Printers Way is now occupied by houses built in the 1990s. The Northfields Estate at the north of the town was completed by the borough council in 1935.

Further east, near the boundary with Luton, there is another area that has largely been developed since the Second World War. To the south of Luton Road, Jeans Way was completed after the war; to the north, Poynters Estate and Hadrian Estate were built on either side of Katherine Drive, where there is a parade of shops. The area also includes the Woodside Estate which contains most of the factories and warehouses that still exist in Dunstable.

== Politics ==
The town lies in the parliamentary constituency of Dunstable and Leighton Buzzard which replaced the South West Bedfordshire seat at the 2024 general election. Since July 2024 former MEP Alex Mayer has represented the seat, the first Labour Party MP for the town since the 1960s. She defeated former MP Andrew Selous of the Conservative Party who represented the South West Bedfordshire constituency from 2001 to 2024.

== Transport ==
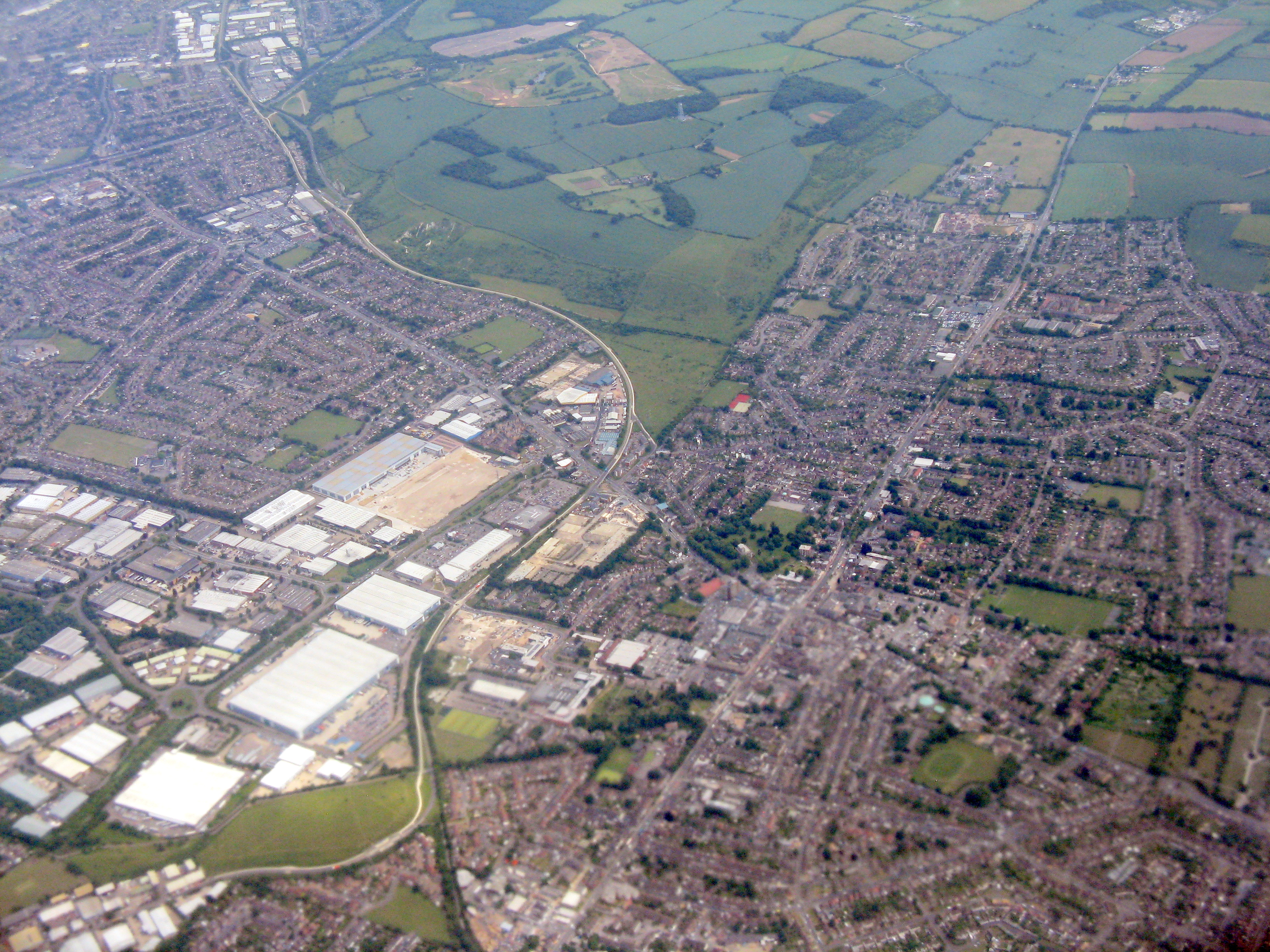
Aerial photograph of Northern Dunstable, showing the Luton to Dunstable Busway and the A5 road

=== Road ===
Formerly, the A5 trunk road lay at the heart of Dunstable's transport infrastructure, running north to south. However, the completion of the northern A5-M1 bypass has meant the de-trunking of the road, relabelled now as the A5183 with a 7.5 tonne weight limit. Movement is complemented by the M1 motorway east of the town in Luton. The nearest motorway junction is J11, which is about 2 mi (3 km) to the east of the town centre via the A505. Although congested, the town's roads provide the means to connect to the country's motorways systems.

=== Bus ===
Dunstable is served by two main operators, Arriva and Centrebus. Arriva runs the interurban services to Luton (direct and via Houghton Regis), Leighton Buzzard and Aylesbury, but other routes have been steadily taken over from Arriva by Centrebus in recent years, which now provides services to St Albans, Harpenden, Luton (direct and via Caddington), Toddington and Milton Keynes. Centrebus also operates three local services within Dunstable to Beecroft/Weatherby, Downside and the Langdale Road estate. Many bus services are financially supported by Central Bedfordshire Council.

==== Luton Dunstable Busway ====
Construction of the Luton Dunstable Busway between Houghton Regis, Dunstable, Luton and Luton Airport was completed in September 2013 at the cost of £91m. Much of the busway runs along the lines of the old railway which has been converted into a guided busway running alongside Blow's Down and dedicated roadway. Buses travel on ordinary roads around Dunstable, Houghton Regis and at the airport, but benefit from fast transit (up to 50 mph) with few stops on the busway itself between these centres. Multiple companies operate different routes which run on the busway.

=== Rail ===
Dunstable was once served by the Dunstable Branch Lines to Leighton Buzzard and to Luton from Dunstable Town railway station. There have been a number of campaigns for the re-establishment of a passenger railway, but these have been superseded by the Luton to Dunstable Busway, which uses the former rail route (see Bus Transport above). Dunstable is one of the largest towns south of the Midlands conurbations without its own rail service. But as part of the large Luton conurbation it is 3 mi (5 km) from north Luton's Leagrave station, 5 mi (8 km) from the central Luton station, and 8 miles from south Luton's Airport Parkway station, which all provide fast rail links to central London.

=== New developments ===
==== A5-M1 Link (Dunstable Northern Bypass) ====
A5-M1 Link (Dunstable Northern Bypass)
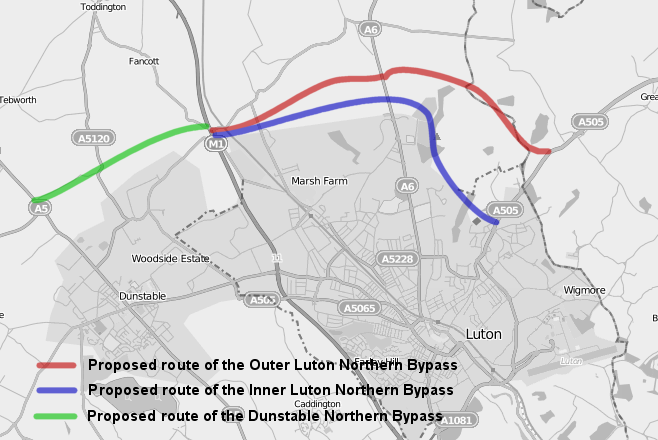
- The route of the Dunstable Northern Bypass proposal and route options for the connecting Luton Northern Bypass.
- Location: Central Bedfordshire
- Proposer: Highways Agency
- Status: Approved
- Type: Road
- Cost estimate: £171 million to £217 million
- Start date: 2014–2015
- Completion date: 2016–2017
- Geometry: KML

The A5-M1 Link (Dunstable Northern Bypass), which opened in May 2017, is a two-lane dual carriageway running east from the A5 north of Dunstable to join the M1 at a new Junction 11a south of Chalton. Here, it is intended to join with a proposed Luton Northern Bypass to form a northern bypass for the wider conurbation. The A5-M1 Link aims to alleviate traffic congestion in Houghton Regis and Dunstable, reduce journey times for long-distance traffic travelling through Dunstable and improve the regional economy. Highways England detrunked the A5 through Dunstable, renumbering it A5183, when the A5-M1 Link opened to the public in May 2017. As a direct result of the detrunking, Central Bedfordshire Council introduced a 7.5 tonne weight limit on most roads in Dunstable town centre in 2017 with the aim of easing congestion.

==== Woodside Link ====
The 1.8 mi (2.9 km) A5505 Woodside Link connects the industrial areas of Dunstable and Houghton Regis to the new junction 11a of the M1 motorway. This road aimed to take traffic out of the town centre, reduce congestion and improve air quality. It formed part of Central Bedfordshire Council's Dunstable Town Centre Masterplan, to improve job opportunities and quality of life for people living and working in Dunstable and neighbouring towns and villages. It also allowed access to the development of greenbelt land north of Houghton Regis for 5,150 new homes and 30 hectares of employment land by 2031. Central Bedfordshire Council delivered the £38.3m scheme with contributions of £20m from SEMLEP's Local Growth Deal, £5m from the UK government's Local Pinch Point Fund and £1m from developers.

== Amenities ==
=== Culture ===
Since opening in April 2007, the 780-seat Grove Theatre has replaced the Queensway Hall as the town's premier arts centre. The Little Theatre, home of the Dunstable Rep Theatre Group, also hosts dramatic performances throughout the year. The auditorium, once part of the Chews Trust, was opened in 1964 by Bernard Bresslaw. It stands next to the historic Chews House on High Street South. The town also has numerous amateur dramatics societies that perform several shows a year, including the Square Drama Circle and Dunstable Amateur Operatics Society.

A Wetherspoons called The Gary Cooper (named after the famous actor who attended the town's grammar school), and a nightclub called BOX3 are located in the Grove Park complex. The complex is also home to Central Bedfordshire College, the Performing Arts Depot (PAD), and BBC Three Counties Radio.

The town receives its television signals from the Sandy Heath TV transmitter. Local radio stations are BBC Three Counties Radio on 103.8 FM, Heart East on 97.6 FM and Luton and Dunstable Hospital Radio that used to broadcast from the Luton & Dunstable Hospital in Luton on 1134 AM. After broadcasting since 1965, the Station ceased Transmission in 2024.

=== Sport and leisure ===
Several parks and open spaces are kept by Central Bedfordshire Council along with Dunstable Leisure Centre. The centre was closed on 4 June 2017 to undergo a £20.1 million redevelopment incorporating a new town library. The centre, re-opened in June 2019 and includes leisure facilities, a gym, swimming pools and a flexible community space for other public and community services, such as Citizens Advice and adult day care/disabled sports. Stevenage Leisure Limited will manage and operate the leisure centre on behalf on Central Bedfordshire Council. It neighbours the Grove Theatre (also managed by SLL), a modern 32-lane ten-pin bowling centre, and the main campus of Central Bedfordshire College.

The town is home to two football clubs, Dunstable Town F.C. and AFC Dunstable, who both play at the Creasey Park Stadium. Dunstable Town F.C. play in the Spartan South Midlands Football League Premier Division and AFC Dunstable play in the Southern League Division One Central. Dunstable Town once famously recruited George Best and subsequently defeated Manchester United 3–2 in the process.

Dunstablians rugby union club play their matches in nearby Houghton Regis at Bidwell Hill. The club currently plays in the RFU Midlands division (level 6).

Lancot Meadow (51.8853°N 0.5434°W) is a small nature reserve managed by the local Wildlife Trust. Alongside the Luton-Dunstable busway lies Blow's Down, a site of special scientific interest.

Dunstable Downs Golf Club, founded in 1906 and designed by James Braid, is on the top of the Downs.

=== Landmarks ===
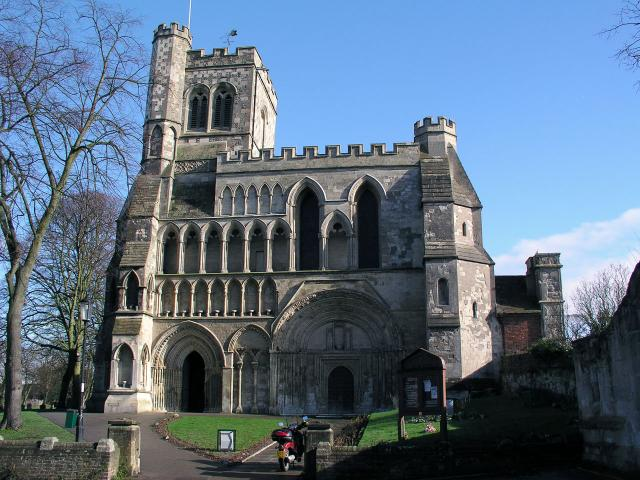
Dunstable Priory

Within the town centre is the Grove Theatre, Priory House Heritage Centre and the Priory Church, where Henry VIII formalised his divorce from Catherine of Aragon. At the heart of the town sits the Quadrant Shopping Centre, while across High Street North a secondary shopping community, the Eleanor's Cross Shopping Precinct, hosts a modern statue commemorating the original cross. Nearby Luton has the Waulud's Bank prehistoric henge and Luton Museum and Art Gallery.

Dunstable Downs, a chalky escarpment outside the town, is a popular site for kite flying, paragliding and hang gliding, while the London Gliding Club provides a base for conventional gliding and other air activities at the bottom of the Downs. Further into the countryside are the open-range Whipsnade Zoo, a garden laid out in the form of a cathedral at Whipsnade Tree Cathedral and the Totternhoe Knolls motte-and-bailey castle.

The Icknield Way Path passes through the town on its 110-mile journey from Ivinghoe Beacon in Buckinghamshire to Knettishall Heath in Suffolk. The Icknield Way Trail, a multi-user route for walkers, horse riders and off-road cyclists also passes through the town. The route, now used for leisure, goes to the west and north of the main conurbation rather than following the road that still bears its name.

== Education ==
Secondary schools in the town include:

- All Saints Academy, Dunstable, formerly Northfields Technology College
- Queensbury Academy, formerly Queensbury Upper School
- Manshead CE Academy, formerly Manshead Upper School

The Priory Academy is a combined Middle and Upper School serving children from the ages of 9 to 16. The former Dunstable Grammar School (later Ashton Middle School) closed in 2016, and its historic buildings have been converted to private residences.

All secondary schools apart from the Priory Academy the town have attached sixth forms.

The Chiltern School and Weatherfield Academy are coeducational special schools in Dunstable. These schools educate pupils from the wider Central Bedfordshire area.

Central Bedfordshire College is a further education site which serves students from Dunstable and the surrounding rural area.

== Notable people ==
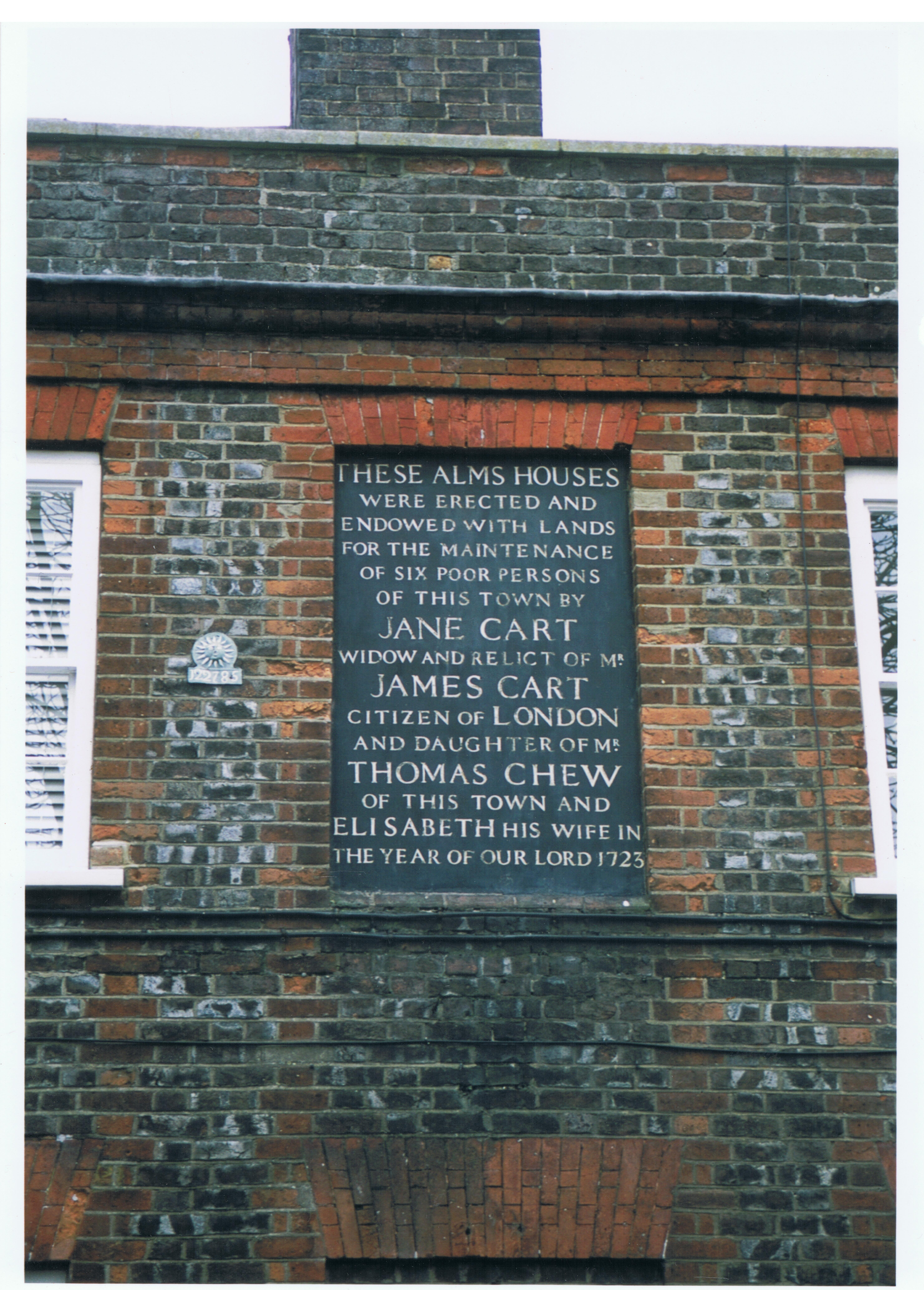
Monumental inscription on the Chew almshouses, commemorating their endowment in 1723.

- Geoffrey de Gorham (ca. 1100–1146), schoolmaster in Dunstable and later Abbot of St Albans
- Alexander Neckam (1157–1217), scientist and teacher
- John Dunstaple (or Dunstable) (ca. 1390 -1453), 15th-century composer thought to be born in Dunstable
- Elkanah Settle (1648–1724), poet and playwright
- The Chew family, including Thomas Aynscombe (died 1740), who co-founded the Chew's House School
- Alfred Morcom (1885–1952), medical doctor and former cricketer
- Khawaja Nazimuddin (1894–1964), former Prime Minister of Pakistan; attended Dunstable Grammar School
- Joe Church (1899–1989), a British missionary who was part of the East African Revival
- Gary Cooper (1901–1961), actor, went to Dunstable Grammar School from 1910 to 1913
- Sam Kydd (1915–1982), television actor; attended Dunstable Grammar School
- Steve and Jimmy Clark (1924–2017; 1922–2009), African-American tap dancers who settled in Dunstable after World War II
- Michael Kilby (1924–2008), Conservative politician and former Dunstable mayor
- Mick Abrahams (1943-2025), founding member of Jethro Tull
- Nigel Benson (born 1955), author and illustrator
- Kevin McCloud (born 1959), designer, writer and television presenter; attended Dunstable Grammar School and Manshead Upper School
- Bernard O'Mahoney (born 1960), crime author
- Kerry Dixon (born 1961), former footballer
- Nikki Iles (born 1963), musician
- Paul Clayton (born 1965), former footballer
- Don Gilét (born 1967), actor best known for playing Lucas Johnson in EastEnders
- Spike Breakwell (born 1968), comedian
- Badly Drawn Boy (born 1969), musician
- Rhodri Marsden (born 1971), musician and writer
- James Asser (born 1975), Labour MP
- Faye Tozer (born 1975), member of the pop group Steps
- Chris Gauthier (born 1976), actor whose family later moved to British Columbia
- Rob Keogh (born 1991), cricketer
- Callum Anderson (born 1992), MP for Buckingham and Bletchley

== Twin towns ==
Dunstable is twinned with:

- Bourgoin-Jallieu, France
- Porz (Cologne), Germany

Dunstable is also unofficially twinned with Dunstable, Massachusetts, United States.

== See also ==
- Sally the Dunstable Witch, 1800s hoax in Dunstable purportedly devised to shame the vicar into cleaning the churchyard
- Dunstable Swan Jewel, jewel from the 1400s excavated in Dunstable and now found in the British Museum
- Dunstable Kestrel, single seat glider plane from the 1930s
- The Three Dukes of Dunstable, a 1688 comedy play by the English writer Thomas D'Urfey
