= Ruth Tongue =

British storyteller and writer (1898–1981)

Ruth Lyndall Tongue (7 February 1898 – 19 September 1981) was a British storyteller and writer who published several collections of folklore and various articles. She remains a controversial figure, with critics questioning her reliability as a folklorist.

== Biography ==
Ruth Tongue was born in Handsworth. She was the third and youngest child of Edwin Tongue, a Congressional Minister, and his wife Mabel Jones. The family moved to Taunton during Ruth's early childhood, and then to Middlesex in 1909. As a young woman, Tongue took classes at the London College of Music and later studied at the London City Literary Institute. She worked as a teacher, taking an interest in both music and drama. In the 1950s, she moved to Crowcombe, Somerset, where she began giving storytelling performances and talks on folklore, both to local audiences and on the radio. She contributed stories to the collections of folklorist Katharine Briggs, who helped her prepare her own manuscripts for publication, and collaborated with her on the book Folktales of England.

Although Tongue was from an educated middle-class upbringing, she felt a deep rapport with the country folk of Somerset. She claimed to have been born during the Chime Hours on a Friday night, giving her a unique connection with people of the countryside; records indicate she was born on a Monday. She told stories of the asrai, sea-morgan, Lazy Lawrence, hyter sprites, oakmen, and many other creatures which appeared in Briggs' Encyclopedia of Fairies, and in later collections of folklore or fantasy.

== Controversy ==
Contemporary response to Tongue's work in folklore was mixed to positive. Some reviewers found her sources vague and the dates of collection confusing, but Tongue responded that most of her notes had been lost to a house fire.

Tongue is remembered as a "problematic figure" and the authenticity of her folklore collections has been called into question. Her collecting methods included recalling stories from her earliest childhood and rewriting stories from memory alone. Modern critics have voiced doubts about the unique creatures and distinctive style found only in Tongue's work, and have raised the possibility that she fabricated stories and borrowed material from other folklore collections or fantasy books. In some cases a careful study of collected folk accounts suggests how Tongue might have invented sources. This is true for instance of her work on the Asrai. J. B. Smith, one of Tongue's harshest critics, has, meanwhile, pointed to her use of other sources in a devil legend. Here is the background to Roud and Simpson's comment that Tongue should be seen as a "storyteller reworking fragments of tradition, not as a reliable collector".

== Published books ==
- Folktales of England, eds. Briggs and Ruth L. Tongue (1965)
- Somerset Folklore (1965)
- The Chime Child, or Somerset Singers: being an account of some of their songs collected over sixty years (1968)
- Forgotten folk tales of the English counties (1970)
- A Dictionary of British Folk-Tales in the English Language by Katharine M. Briggs (1970) – Tongue contributed numerous stories.
