= Robert Edwin Phillips =

- Born: 11 April 1895; West Bromwich, Staffordshire
- Died: 23 September 1968 (aged 73); St Veep, Cornwall
- Burial place: St Veep Churchyard
- Military career
- Allegiance: United Kingdom
- Branch: British Army
- Service years: 1914 - 1919
- Rank: Captain
- Units: The Royal Warwickshire Regiment
- Conflicts: World War I
- Awards: Victoria Cross

Robert Edwin "Bob" Phillips VC (11 April 1895 – 23 September 1968) was an English recipient of the Victoria Cross, the highest and most prestigious award for gallantry in the face of the enemy that can be awarded to British and Commonwealth forces.

== Early life ==
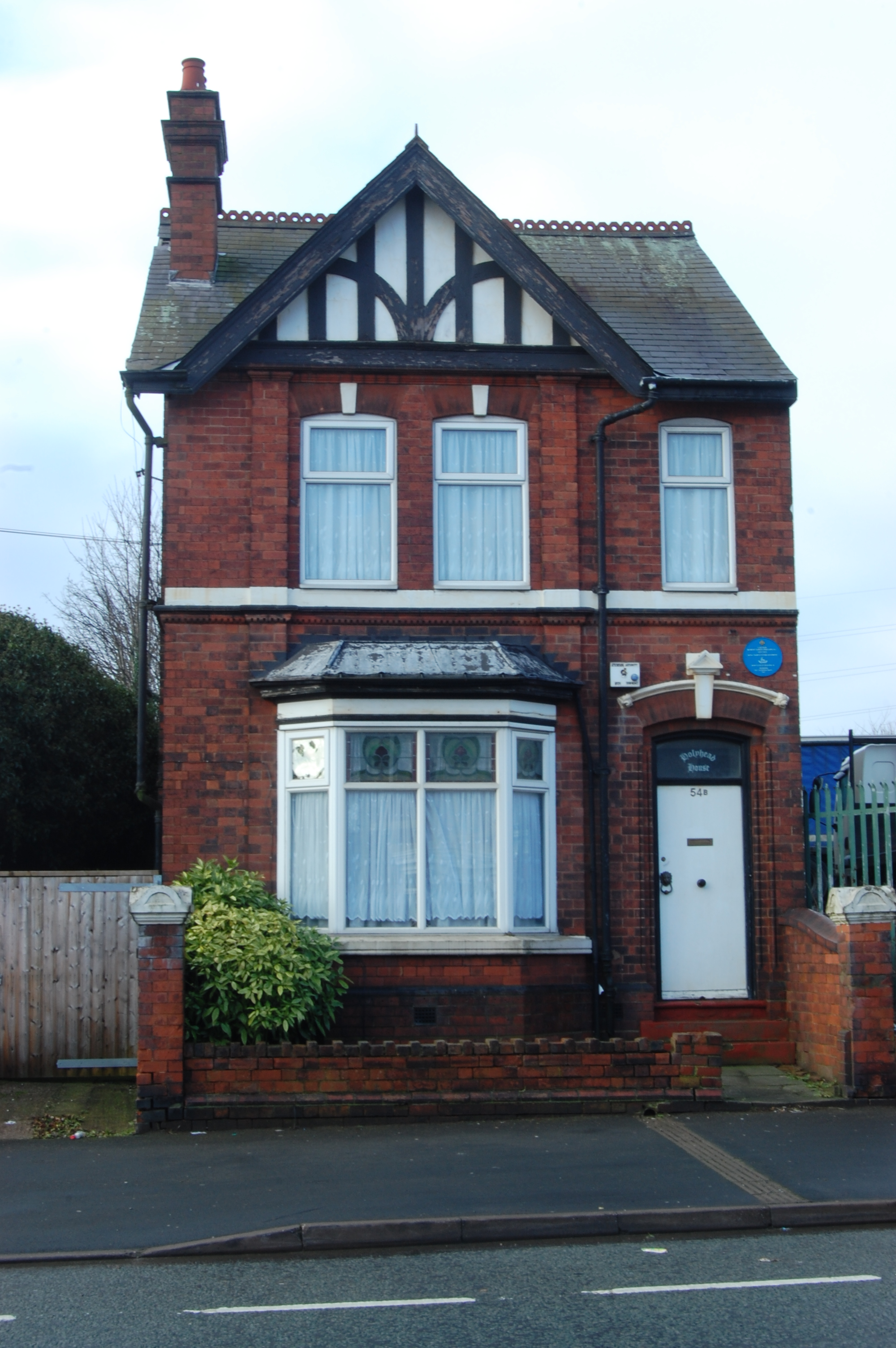
Holyhead House, Philips' childhood home

Philips was born at 12, Queen Street, Hill Top, West Bromwich, (then Staffordshire) England. His father was a roll turner. He was educated at King Edward VI Grammar School, Aston.

== The Medal ==
He was 21 years old, and a Temporary Lieutenant in the 13th Battalion, The Royal Warwickshire Regiment, British Army, attached 9th (S) Battalion during the First World War when the following deed took place for which he was awarded the VC.

On 25 January 1917 near Kut, Mesopotamia, Lieutenant Phillips went to the assistance of his commanding officer (Edward Elers Delaval Henderson) who was lying in the open, having been mortally wounded while leading a counter-attack. The lieutenant went out with a comrade and, under the most intense fire, they succeeded in bringing their commanding officer back to British lines.

He later achieved the rank of captain.

His Victoria Cross is displayed at the Royal Regiment of Fusiliers Museum (Royal Warwickshire), Warwick, England.

== Blue plaque ==
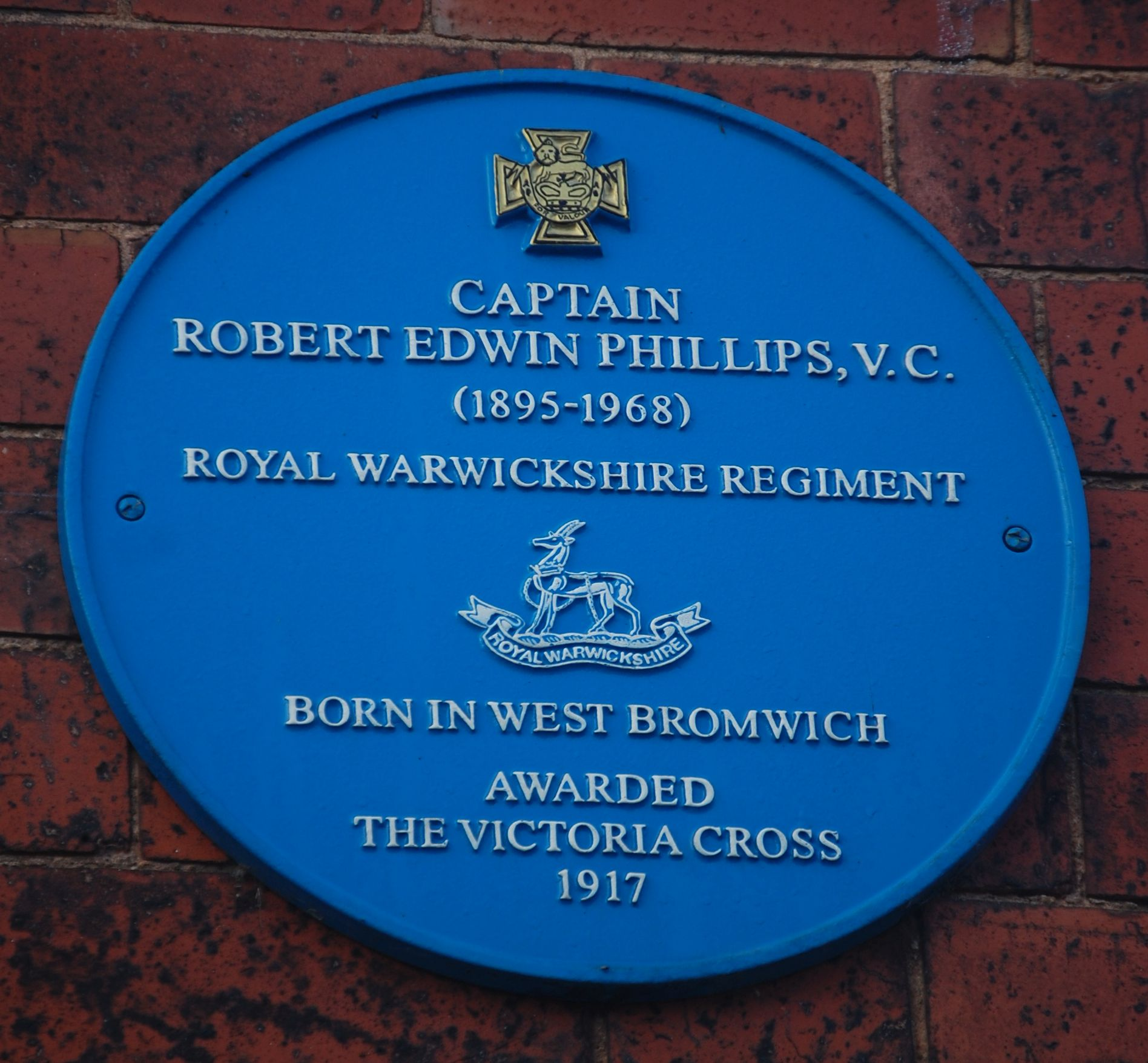
Blue plaque on Holyhead House.

On 26 January 2008, a blue plaque was erected on Holyhead House, Phillips' childhood home, at 54b, Hill Top, West Bromwich.

== Street name ==
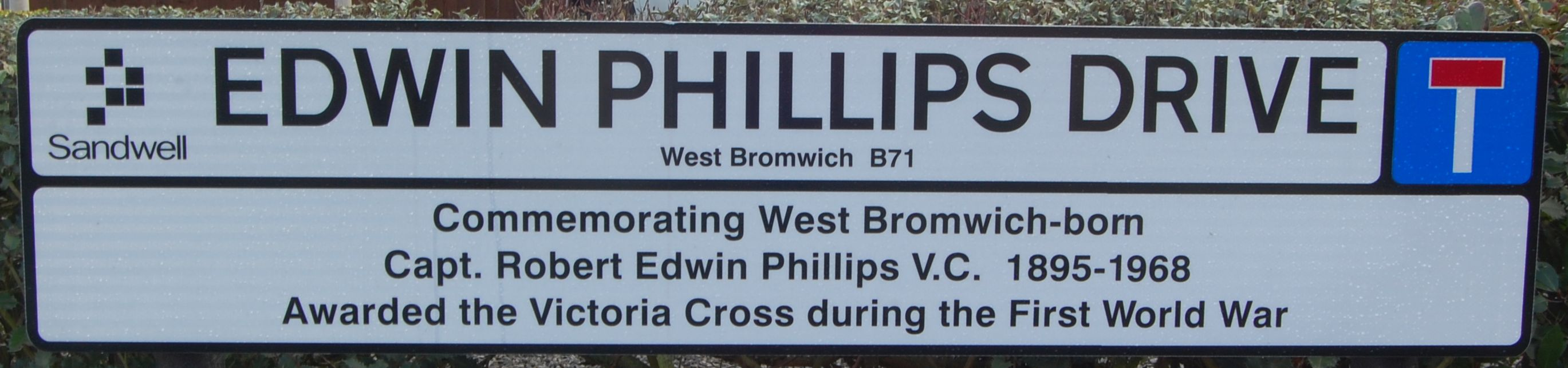
The revised street name plate

A street in Sandwell, near his birthplace, was named in his honour in 2000. However the name "Edwin Phillips Drive" was used in error. Derek Pinches, Phillips' great nephew, noticed the error and local historians campaigned to have the name changed. This met with resistance from residents of the drive, 85% of whom objected. As a compromise, Sandwell Metropolitan Borough Council replaced the street name plate with one explaining that the street name commemorates "Capt Robert Edwin Phillips V.C.".

== Bibliography ==
- Gliddon, Gerald (2005). The Sideshows. VCs of the First World War. Sutton Publishing. ISBN 978-0-7509-2084-1.
