= Edward Elers Delaval Henderson =

British Victoria Cross recipient (1878-1917)

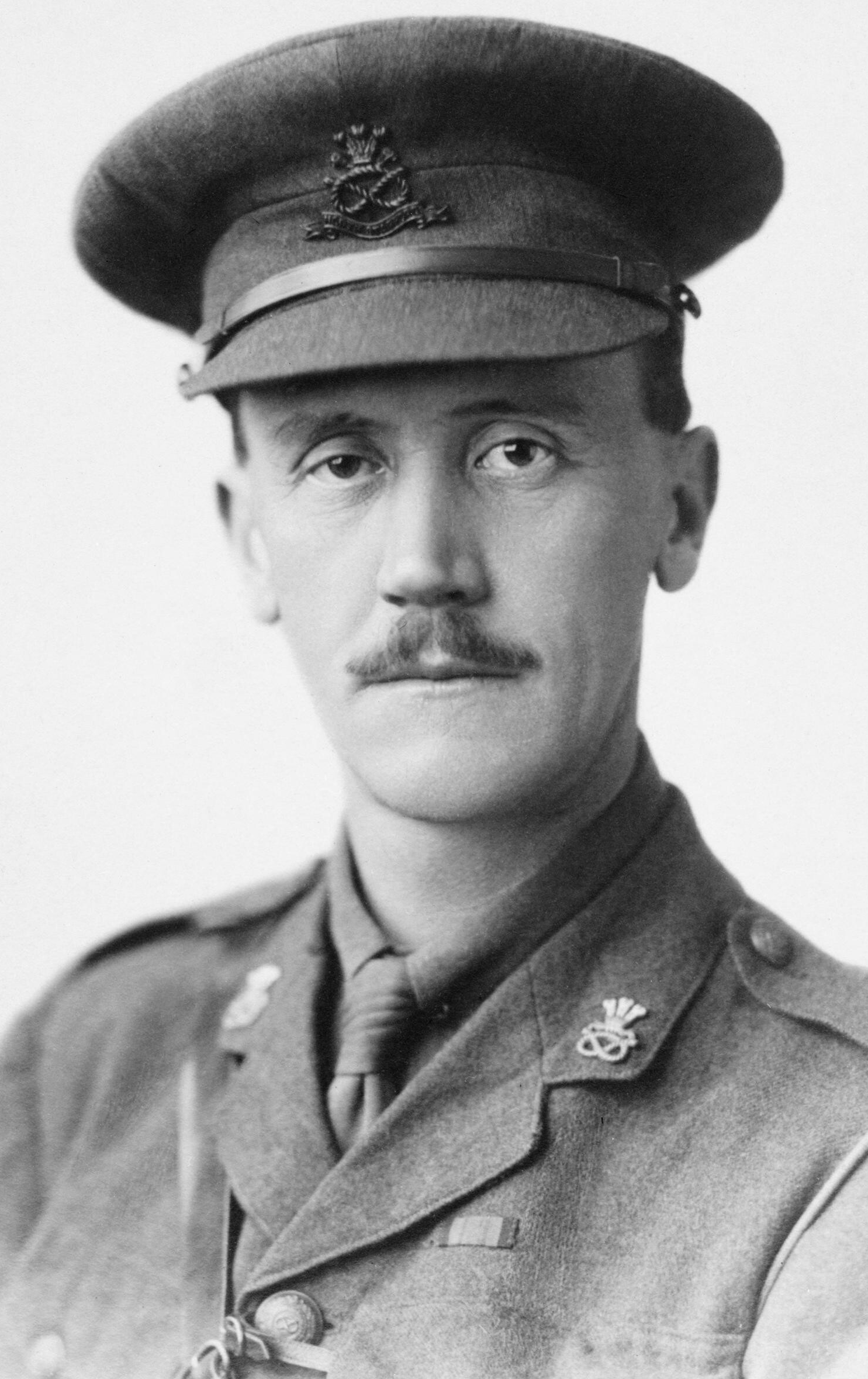
- Born: 2 October 1878; Shimla, British India
- Died: 25 January 1917 (aged 38); River Hai, near Kut, Mesopotamia
- Burial place: Amara Military Cemetery
- Military career
- Allegiance: United Kingdom
- Branch: British Army
- Service years: 1900–1917
- Rank: Lieutenant Colonel
- Units: North Staffordshire Regiment
- Commands: 9th (Service) Battalion, Royal Warwickshire Regiment
- Conflicts: World War I †
- Awards: Victoria Cross

Lieutenant-Colonel Edward Elers Delaval Henderson VC (2 October 1878 – 25 January 1917) was a British recipient of the Victoria Cross, the highest and most prestigious award for gallantry in the face of the enemy that can be awarded to British and Commonwealth forces.

== Early life ==
Henderson was educated at Dunstable Grammar School. He joined the West India Regiment as Second lieutenant on 15 December 1900, and was seconded for service with the Northern Nigeria Regiment, West African Frontier Force. He was promoted to Lieutenant on 10 February 1902.

== Victoria cross action ==
He was 38 years old, and a major and acting lieutenant colonel in The North Staffordshire Regiment (The Prince of Wales's), British Army, attached to The Royal Warwickshire Regiment, commanding 9th Battalion during the First World War. On 25 January 1917 on the west bank of the River Hai, near Kut, Mesopotamia, he performed the deed for which he was awarded the Victoria Cross.

Maj. (actg. Lt.-Col.) Edward Elers Delavel Henderson, late N. Staffs. R.

For most conspicuous bravery, leadership and personal example when in command of his battalion.

Lt.-Col. Henderson brought his battalion up to our two front-line trenches, which were under intense fire, and his battalion had suffered heavy casualties when the enemy made a heavy counter-attack, and succeeded in penetrating our line in several places, the situation becoming critical.

Although shot through the arm, Lt.-Col. Henderson jumped onto the parapet and advanced alone some distance in front of his battalion, cheering them on under the most intense fire over 500 yards of open ground.

Again wounded, he nevertheless continued to lead his men on in the most gallant, manner, finally capturing the position by a bayonet charge.

He was again twice wounded, and died when he was eventually brought in.

— London Gazette

He was buried in the Amara War Cemetery.

== The medal ==
His VC is on display in the Lord Ashcroft Gallery at the Imperial War Museum, London.

== See also ==
- Robert Edwin Phillips
