= Dunstable Downs Golf Club =

Golf club in Bedfordshire, England

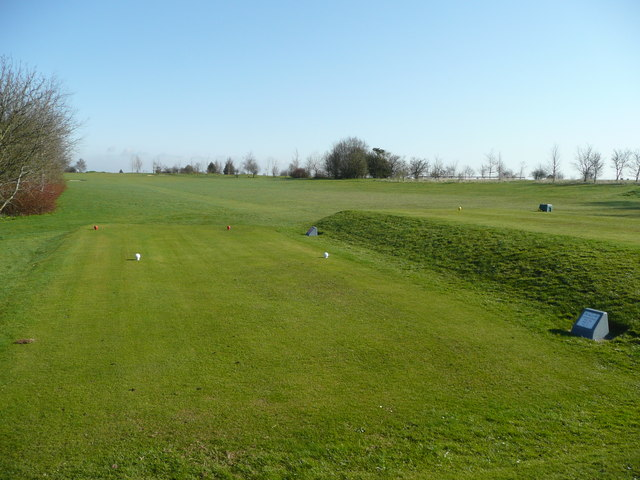
- 13th

- Location within Bedfordshire
- 51°52′20″N 0°31′54″W

Club information
- Location: Dunstable, Bedfordshire, England
- Established: November 1906
- Tota holes: 18
- Website: www.Dunstabledownsgolf.co.uk

Dunstable Downs Golf Club is a golf club in the southwest of Dunstable, Bedfordshire, England. It was established in 1906. As of 1995 the course measured 6251 yards. The club has hosted the British PGA Matchplay Championship. The present layout after 24 years of its formation was designed by five times Open Champion, James Braid. The course sits at an elevation of about 800 feet above the sea level.
