= Chime hours =

Birth folklore from the north of England

The term chime hours originated in the north of England and refers to one of several myths related to the time of one’s birth. It was popularized by folklorist Ruth Tongue, who also coined the term "chime child[ren]". The idea behind this piece of folklore is that individuals born during certain hours of the day or night gain special powers; although what these times are seems to vary depending on the individual source or location. These powers also seem to range dramatically from source to source, with talk of everything from being extraordinarily perceptive towards animals to being able to see ghosts. It is claimed that these powers at one time led to accusations of witchcraft. It is also said that if chime children or other similarly gifted individuals use their powers for selfish ends, rather than for the benefit of others, they are to perish "miserably and spiritually". Similar myths have been said to exist in other parts of the world, including Ireland, Scotland, Denmark, and China.

== Prominent debates ==
=== Chime hours ===
There is much contention over which hours constitute the chime hours. Some argue that midnight is the only true chime hour, as referenced by Charles Dickens in the first chapter of David Copperfield. This is generally agreed by myths from Somerset and Yorkshire.

According to those in Somerset and East Anglia, the chime hours often corresponded with the chiming of church bells marking the hours of monastic prayer at 8 p.m., midnight and 4 a.m. In an article in the journal Folklore published by The Folklore Society, Grace Hadow and Ruth Anderson suggest the addition of midday to these hours, referring to the chime hours as eight, midnight, four, and midday. Those in Sussex cite the chime hours as 3, 6, 9 and 12 o'clock, while Ruth Tongue claims these "potent ghostly hours" to be from Friday at midnight to cockcrow on Saturday morning.

=== Powers or abilities granted ===
There are a wide array of abilities said to be granted to those born within the chime hours. For example, some claim that these include the power to see ghosts or spirits and to speak to these ghosts and fairies without risk of coming to any harm. Others claim these powers include power over black witchcraft, being musically gifted, control over animals, and being able to cure ailing animals and plants. Additionally, "chime children" are believed to have exclusive access to sensitive information due to others lowering their guards and speaking openly around these individuals. As Thomas Thistleton-Dyer words it, these individuals have access to "much that is hidden from others".

Ruth Tongue attempted to compile an official list of the powers of herself and her fellow “chime children”: such as the powers to

- "see the dead and the fairies, and speak with them but come to no harm – such encounters must never be sought"
- "have immunity from all ill-wishing, as many of the clergy have"
- "love and control all animals – so chime children often become herdsmen or veterinary surgeons"; and
- "have a knowledge of herbs and a way of healing others".

== Ruth Tongue ==
It was Ruth Tongue (1898–1981) who coined the term "chime child" and drew further attention to the myth of the chime hours by claiming to be one of these "chime children" herself. She stated that her powers as a so called "chime person", was her ability to get towns people to be open with her and tell their stories. Although, this was not her only claim to fame, as she made a successful living as a folklorist in general. Tongue documented her experiences as a "chime child" in several publications including Somerset Folklore (1965) and The Chime Child, or Somerset Singers (1968), in which she recalls this rhyme about “chime children” that she recalled having recited to her by a local sexton’s wife as a child:

"They that be born of a Friday’s chime
Be masters of musick and finders of rhyme,
And every beast will do what they say,
And every herb that do grow in the clay,
They do see what they see and hear what they hear,
But they never do tell in a hundred year".

While some regard her words and self-proclaimed first-hand experience as law in terms of the chime hours, it has become clear that she did not grow up in Somerset, where she claims to have spent her childhood and obtained much of the folklore that she would later document. Thus some people question whether or not she may have made some amount of her material up or inaccurately recalled past experiences. As Jacqueline Simpson and Stephen Roud word it in A Dictionary of English Folklore, Tongue's many tales in The Chime Child (1968) are "based on very early childhood memories; in Forgotten Folktales she gives only the vaguest hints as to where, when, and from whom she had obtained the stories; any notes she may have made at the time were lost in moves and fires."

== Mentions of the Chime Hours ==
=== Literature ===
- Adam Slater's The Shadowing #2: Skinned
- Leon Garfield's Empty Sleeve
- Franny Billingsley's, Chime (novel)
- Edward Storey's, Almost a Chime Child
- Charles Dickens', David Copperfield
- Kate Morton's The Clockmaker's Daughter
- G.V. Anderson's A Strange Uncertain Light

=== Music/Art ===
- Faster Than Sound - The Chimes Hour
- Memotone - Chime Hours
