= Asrai =

Type of aquatic fairy in English folklore and literature

The asrai is a type of aquatic fairy in English folklore and literature. They are usually depicted as female, live in lakes and are similar to the mermaid and nixie. Rather than originating from folklore, the asrai may have been invented by the Scottish poet Robert Williams Buchanan.

== Etymology and origin ==
The etymology of the word "asrai" is unknown. "Asrey" or "ashray" sometimes appear as spelling variants.

It is unclear whether the asrai was ever part of folk belief. Their oldest known appearance in print was the poem "The Asrai" by Robert Williams Buchanan, first published in April 1872, and followed by a sequel, "The Changeling: A Legend of the Moonlight." The English journalist Robert Francillon, who commissioned the second poem for a special Christmas edition of The Gentleman's Magazine, had originally requested a piece inspired by legends about Llyn Tegid (Bala Lake) in Wales. He believed that the asrai were Buchanan's original creation.

The asrai gained renewed attention through the works of British storyteller Ruth Tongue, whose reliability as a folklorist has been questioned. Tongue's collected tales often show signs of drawing from popular fiction.

== Characteristics ==
In Buchanan's poetry, the asrai are pale, gentle beings, older than humanity, who fear light and live beneath a lake. Buchanan's poem "The Changeling" features a male asrai who inhabits a human body, becoming a changeling in search of an immortal soul.

Ruth Tongue attributed stories of the asrai to Cheshire, Shropshire, and the Welsh Border. In her collected work, the asrai are timid and shy, very beautiful, and have webbed feet and green hair. They live for hundreds of years and come up to the surface of the water once each century to bathe in the moonlight. They are long-lived, only aging when exposed to moonlight. Tongue recounts the story of a fisherman who captured an asrai and put it in his boat. It seemed to plead for its freedom in an unknown language, and when the fisherman bound it the touch of its cold wet hands burned his skin like fire, leaving a permanent mark. He covered the asrai with wet weeds, and it continued to protest, its voice getting fainter and fainter. By the time the fisherman reached the shore, the asrai had melted away leaving nothing but a puddle of water in the boat, for the asrai perish if directly exposed too long to the sun. Their inability to survive daylight is similar to that of trolls from Scandinavian folklore.

Numerous folktale collections have reprinted or retold Tongue's stories. Nancy Arrowsmith describes asrai as always female and standing 2–4 ft (0.61–1.22 m) tall. In a retelling by Rosalind Kerven, the asrai appears with a fishtail instead of legs, and attempts to lure a man with promises of gold and jewels into the deepest part of the lake to drown or simply to trick him. However, she cannot tolerate human coarseness and vulgarity, and this will be enough to frighten her away. This tale had previously been told of a Shropshire mermaid without the term asrai.

== Authenticity and Modern Origins ==
Although often presented as part of traditional English or Welsh folklore, the Asrai’s credentials as a folk belief are tenuous. As scholar Sarah Allison has argued, the Asrai’s earliest and clearest appearance is in Robert Buchanan’s 19th-century poetry, particularly The Asrai (1872) and The Changeling (1875). While Buchanan corresponded with editor Robert Francillon about possibly drawing inspiration from the legend of Bala Lake, Francillon later admitted that Buchanan ignored these suggestions entirely and invented a self-contained mythos instead. This points to the Asrai being a literary creation rather than a genuine product of oral tradition.

A century later, Ruth Tongue claimed to have recorded stories about the Asrai in Cheshire and Shropshire. However, the reliability of Tongue’s sources is widely disputed. Scholars have noted that she often drew heavily from fiction and presented invented or hybridised tales as authentic folklore. Many details in her version, including the Asrai's aversion to moonlight and ability to melt, closely parallel Buchanan’s poetic imagery. As Allison concludes, Tongue’s contribution should be seen as a creative retelling influenced by literature, not evidence of pre-existing folk belief. The Asrai, therefore, may best be understood as a modern myth that emerged through a feedback loop between literary fiction and folklore-style retellings in the 20th century.

A beer called Asrai is brewed by Coniston Brewing Co.

== See also ==
- Fuath
- Glaistig
- Kelpie
- Melusine
- Morgan le Fay
- Morgen
- Naiad
- Näkki
- Nymph
- Rusalka
- Selkie
- Siren
- Undines

== Links ==
- The Changeling: A Legend of the Moonlight
