= Guy Napier =

English cricketer and soldier

Lieutenant Guy Greville Napier (26 January 1884 – 25 September 1915) was an English cricketer and World War I combatant. Following his death from wounds received in France, Wisden declared him "one of the best medium pace bowlers seen in the University match in his own generation".

Guy Napier was educated at Marlborough College and Pembroke College, Cambridge. He was commissioned in the 35th Sikhs. While attached to the 47th Sikhs at the Battle of Loos he died of wounds on 25 September 1915.

A right-arm medium pace bowler and tail-end right-handed batsman, Napier made 81 first-class appearances largely for Middlesex and Cambridge University between 1904 and 1913, taking 31 wickets in his first four matches and 365 in total.
