= Richard Cabut =

Writer

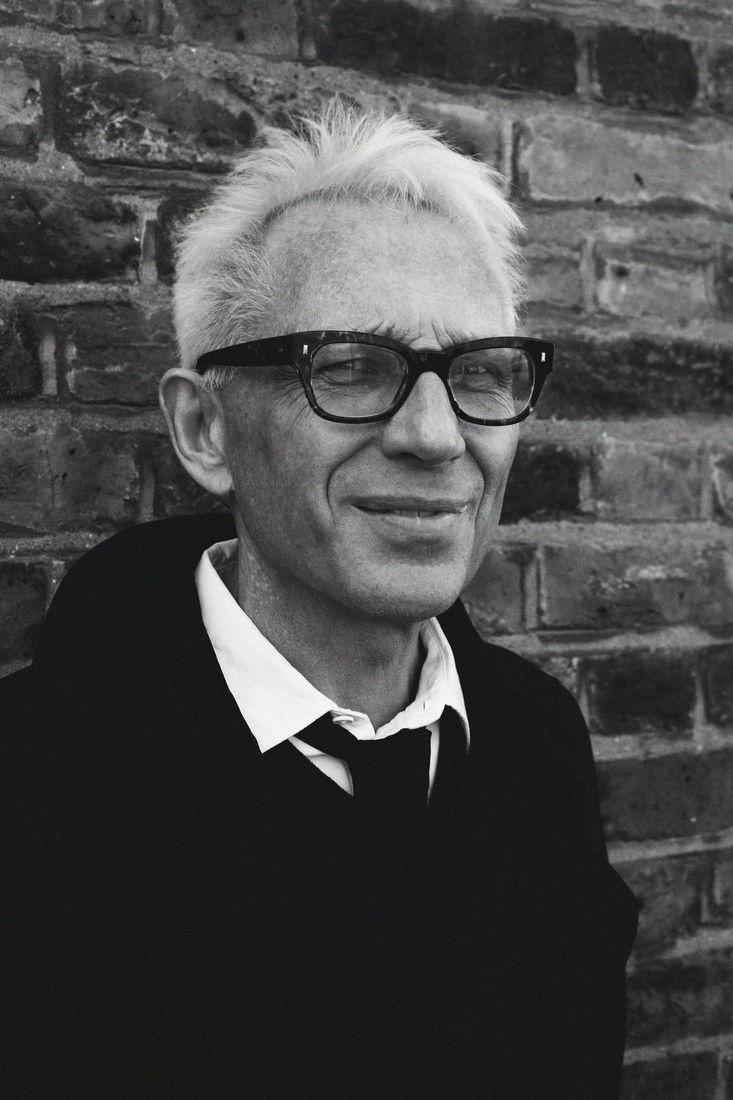
Richard Cabut
- Born: 29 March 1960 (age 66) Aylesbury, Buckinghamshire, England
- Occupation: Author; Journalist; Playwright; Musician
- Genre: Literary fiction cultural criticism poetry

Website
- www.richardcabut.com

Richard Cabut (born 29 March 1960) is a British writer, editor, and cultural commentator. He is known for his work across fiction, journalism, and criticism, particularly in relation to contemporary literature, post-punk and underground culture, urban memory, and psychogeography, blending memoir, fiction, theory and lyricism. Cabut is the author of the novel Looking for a Kiss (2020; expanded ed. 2023), the avant-garde prose work Ripped Backsides: Postcards from Beneath the Pavement (2025), and the modern fiction/poetry collection Disorderly Magic and Other Disturbances (2023). He co-edited the anthology Punk Is Dead: Modernity Killed Every Night (2017).

Although initially known for coining the term 'positive punk' in New Musical Express in 1983, Cabut’s reputation rests primarily on his literary output.

== Early life ==
Cabut was born in Aylesbury, Buckinghamshire, and raised in Dunstable, Bedfordshire. He was educated at Dunstable Grammar School (later Manshead School) and the Polytechnic of North London. Cabut’s family background includes his parents’ wartime displacement from Eastern Poland, a history that informs recurring themes of exile, rupture and cultural memory in his writing.

== Fiction ==
Cabut’s fiction frequently revisits the cultural aftermath of 1970s and 1980s punk and post punk while employing modernist and post-modern techniques.

His novel Looking for a Kiss (2020; expanded edition 2023 – PC-Press) is set between London and New York in the post-punk period. The narrative follows two protagonists navigating romantic and cultural disillusion. Reviewers have described it as an insider chronicle of the 80s post-punk era, combining autobiographical texture with fictional structure. The novel situates punk within a broader literary lineage, incorporating references to Beat writing, pop art and avant-garde cinema.

Disorderly Magic and Other Disturbances (Far West Press, 2023) comprises fiction and hybrid prose pieces marked by non-linear construction and elements of magic realism. The collection explores psychological fragmentation, urban estrangement and altered states of perception through compressed, impressionistic narratives.

In Ripped Backsides: Postcards from Beneath the Pavement (Far West Press, 2025), Cabut adopts a collage-like, psychogeographic form. Structured as fragments, city-portraits and reflective prose sequences, the work moves between London, New York, Berlin and other ‘noir’ cities. Critics have noted its experimental method and affinities with situationist and avant-garde traditions.[9] The text departs from conventional plotting in favour of associative drift and memory-montage.

Cabut’s short fiction has also appeared in anthologies including The Edgier Waters (2006) and Affinity (2015).

== Cultural criticism ==
Cabut co-edited and contributed to Punk Is Dead: Modernity Killed Every Night (Zer0 Books, 2017), an anthology combining essays, memoir and cultural analysis. The volume examines punk’s emergence and commodification, arguing for the distinctiveness of its early period. Reviews have discussed the book’s contribution to participant-driven punk historiography.

‘Punk is Dead shows the transmission of culture as a kind of lucid group dreaming,’ (Chris Kraus, The Times Literary Supplement). ‘Richard Cabut… has chosen the theme of punk as a transformative force, a becoming,’ (Dickon Edwards, The Wire).

== Journalism and early writing ==
Between 1979 and 1982, Cabut produced the fanzine Kick, documenting the post-punk underground. According to historian Mathew Worley: 'Kick proved integral to developing a "positive punk" based on a premise of "individuality, creativity, rebellion."' The fanzine also displayed a mystical approach to political culture. ‘Kick suggested an anarchism that was more of a “mystic affair than a political one”, revolving around an “experiment in life”’

Writing under the pseudonym Richard North, he introduced the term positive punk in New Musical Express (19 February 1983), describing a strand of post-punk and culture emphasising romanticism, aesthetic experimentation and individualism. The phrase has been cited in academic studies of goth and post-punk subculture. Historian Matthew Worley noted: “Richard Cabut (Richard North) was the first to outline the basis of what eventually became codified as ‘goth’.”

The Positive Punk piece was the basis for an episode of LWT’s Friday night arts and leisure series, South of Watford.

Cabut has written for the BBC, and contributed to The Guardian, The Daily Telegraph, Time Out and The Big Issue.

== Theatre ==
Cabut has written plays staged at London venues including the Arts Theatre and the Bread and Roses Theatre. His dramatic work addresses identity, transformation and subcultural memory.

== Music ==
Cabut played bass guitar in the post-punk band Brigandage, who released the LP Pretty Funny Thing (Gung Ho Records, 1986).

One track, Angel of Vengeance, featured on the boxset Silhouettes & Statues (A Gothic Revolution 1978 - 1986/Cherry Red, 2017). Cabut co-wrote the song and the accompanying sleeve notes.

== Reception ==
Cabut is regarded as a distinctive voice within British countercultural writing, particularly for his sustained engagement with post-punk history and its afterlives in contemporary art and literature.

== Selected works ==
Novel

Looking for a Kiss (2020; expanded ed. 2023 – PC-Press)

Avant-garde prose and poetry

Disorderly Magic and Other Disturbances (2023 – Far West Press)

Ripped Backsides: Postcards from Beneath the Pavement (2025 – Far West Press)

Non-fiction

Punk Is Dead: Modernity Killed Every Night (co-editor, 2017 – Zer0 Books)
