= William Nixon (obstetrician) =

Maltese-born professor of obstetrics and gynaecology (1903–1968)

William Nixon CBE FRCS
- Born: William Carl Wallace Nixon; 22 November 1903; Floriana, British Malta
- Died: 9 February 1966 (aged 62)
- Education: Epsom College; St Mary's Hospital Medical School, London
- Known for: Establishing Hong Kong's first family planning clinic
- Medical career
- Profession: Surgeon
- Institutions: St Mary's Hospital Medical School; Great Ormond Street Hospital for Children; University of Istanbul; London University
- Sub-specialties: Obstetrics and gynaecology

William Charles Wallace Nixon (22 November 1903 – 9 February 1966) was a Maltese-born professor of obstetrics and gynaecology at the University of London, director of the obstetric unit at University College, and member of the Expert Advisory Committee on Maternity Care for the World Health Organization.

In the 1930s, he set up the first birth control clinic in Hong Kong. He pushed for changes in abortion law, promoted psychological preparedness for childbirth, and wrote and spoke on diet in pregnancy. Unlike many others in his field in his time, his concern over the number of illegal abortions and mental state of women with unwanted pregnancies led him to offer abortions in the NHS before the Abortion Act 1967.

In 1964 he was an expert witness at the Dering v Uris trial.

== Early life and education ==
William Nixon was born William Carl Wallace Nixon, on 22 November 1903 in Floriana, Malta, to mathematics professor William Nixon and his wife Melita née Reichelmann. Fear of his German background led his parents to send him to England in 1918 and then to change "Carl" to "Charles" in 1920. He completed his early education at Epsom College, where he excelled in sports and became prefect. In 1922 he gained a scholarship to study medicine at St Mary's Hospital Medical School, where he played on their rugby team. In 1927 he received the conjoint.

== Early career ==
Nixon completed his first junior surgical posts under Vincent Warren Low, and then Zachary Cope at St Mary's. This was followed by an appointment with Thomas Twistington Higgins at Great Ormond Street Hospital for Children. In 1930, he was appointed obstetrics and gynaecology resident to Aleck Bourne back at St Mary's, followed by a six-month appointment at Queen Charlotte's Maternity Hospital, where he published his first papers. After receiving his MD, in 1933 he became a member of the Royal College of Obstetricians and Gynaecologists.

By 1934, both St Mary's and Queen Charlotte's had taken him on as consultant. The following year he resigned to take up a professorship in Hong Kong, where he set up the country's first birth control clinic. He worked there for a few years before returning to England in 1938, when he joined the Soho Hospital for Women and the London County Council as consultant. In 1941 he delivered the fourth Blair-Bell Memorial Lecture, the topic of his talk being diet in pregnancy.

== Later career ==
In 1943 Nixon was sent to the University of Istanbul, Turkey, where he was appointed professor. When he returned to London three years later, he took over F. J. Browne as director of obstetrics at University College London (UCL) and professor of obstetrics and gynaecology at the University of London. He became a member of the Expert Advisory Committee on Maternity Care for the World Health Organization and the Ministry of Health's Standing Advisory Committee on Maternity Services. In 1947, he was on the British Medical Association council. He pushed for changes in abortion law and promoted psychological preparedness for childbirth. In 1954, he called for a survey to compare hospital births with home births. This later led to the perinatal mortality survey of the National Birthday Trust Fund.

Nixon was a member of the Abortion Law Reform Association, whose work contributed to the later Abortion Act 1967. Unlike many others in his field in the early 1960s, his understanding of the high number of complicated backstreet abortions, and resulting mental illness of women with unwanted pregnancies led him to offer safer abortions in the NHS, before the passing of the 1967 Abortion Act. (Note: By 1920 in the UK, the procedure of induced abortion was generally safe when performed by trained professionals. By the mid-1960s unsafe abortion was the leading cause of avoidable maternal deaths. Over the course of a decade following the 1967 Abortion Act, gynaecological admissions due to abortion complications dropped significantly and deaths ceased.) As explained by Geoffrey Chamberlain, none of Nixon's abortions at UCL were illegal. His mentor Bourne, had already tested in the courts in 1938 that an abortion could be performed on mental health grounds, to prevent psychological stress in an underage girl pregnant by rape. Women approached Nixon knowing he would be non-discriminatory and not overcharge them. To confirm the mental state of the woman, he was assisted by psychiatrists; first Keith Soddy and later Elizabeth Tylden.

In 1964 he was an expert witness at the Dering v Uris trial.

== Awards and honours ==
The University of Bristol gave Nixon an honorary MD in 1961, and fours later he was made a Commander of the Order of the British Empire.

== Death ==
Nixon died on 9 February 1966, and was survived by his wife and one daughter.

== Selected publications ==
=== Books ===
- Relief of Pain in Childbirth: A handbook for the general practitioner. London: Cassell and Company. 1951.

=== Articles ===
- Nixon, W. C. W. (December 1942). "Diet in Pregnancy". BJOG: An International Journal of Obstetrics and Gynaecology. 49 (6): 614–636. doi:10.1111/j.1471-0528.1942.tb05757.x. ISSN 1470-0328. S2CID 7571638.
- Eckstein, A.; Nixon, W. C. (23 March 1946). "Congenital Malaria". British Medical Journal. 1 (4446): 432–433. ISSN 0007-1447. PMC 2058534. PMID 20786615. (Co-author)
- Schild H. O.; Fitzpatrick R. J.; Nixon W. C. (3 February 1951). "Activity of the human cervix and corpus uteri. Their response to drugs in early pregnancy". Lancet. 1 (6649): 250–253. doi:10.1016/s0140-6736(51)93313-2. ISSN 0140-6736. PMID 14795835. (Co-author)
- Bainbridge M. H.; Nixon W. C.; Schild H. O. (19 May 1956). "Synthetic Oxytocin". British Medical Journal. 1 (4976): 1133–1135. doi:10.1136/bmj.1.4976.1133. ISSN 0007-1447. PMC 1979594. PMID 13316092. (Co-author)
- Nixon, W. C. W. (17 January 1959). "Abortion in the USA". British Medical Journal. 1 (5115): 155. ISSN 0007-1447. PMC 1992258.

== Bibliography ==
- Chamberlain, Geoffrey (2004). Special delivery: the life of the celebrated British obstetrician William Nixon. Royal College of Obstetricians and Gynaecologists. ISBN 1-900364-98-0.
