= Upper school =

Type of school in the UK

Upper schools in the UK are usually schools within secondary education. Outside England, the term normally refers to a section of a larger school.

== England ==
=== The three-tier model ===
Upper schools are a type of secondary school found in a minority of English local education authorities. Whilst most areas in England use a two-tier educational system – primary (ages 5–11) and secondary (ages 11–16 or 11–18 if they operate a sixth form) – counties such as Leicestershire, and Suffolk use a three-tier system of lower (ages 5–9 or 10), middle (ages 9 to 13 or 14), and Upper schools (ages 13 or 14 to 16, or 18 if they include Years 12 and 13, known as a Sixth form).

The introduction of such systems began in Leicestershire in 1957. West Yorkshire followed in 1963, but the system has gradually been withdrawn in some areas since the introduction of the National Curriculum. This is because of the nature of the curriculum, which is divided into Key Stages which do not fully align with the three-tier system. In some areas (such as Leicestershire) where this type of school is in use, the middle-tier schools are known as High Schools; in other areas it is the upper tier schools that are called High Schools, especially if they do not include Years 12 and 13.

In 2018, both Northumberland and Bedford were moving away from the three-tier model.

=== Grammar schools and Upper schools ===
In Buckinghamshire, which retains the 11-plus, the term is used for secondary schools which admit applicants without reference to the test. These are elsewhere sometimes called secondary modern schools).

== United States ==
Many independent and some parochial schools in the United States also tend to favor the term "upper school" to designate grades 9–12, normally called "high school". Schools favoring this terminology may use "middle school" for grades 6–8, "lower school" for grades 1–5, and "early childhood" (education) for pre-K through Kindergarten.
