= Queensbury Academy, Dunstable =

Queensbury Academy

Location
- Langdale Road; Dunstable, Bedfordshire, LU6 3BU; England; 51°52′42″N 0°31′42″W

Information
- Former name: Queensbury Upper School
- Type: Academy
- Motto: CARE (Co-operation - Aspiration - Respect - Endeavour)
- Established: 1972
- Local authority: Central Bedfordshire Council
- Trust: Anthem Schools Trust
- Department for Education URN: 138571 Tables
- Ofsted: Reports
- Head teacher: Helen Palmer
- Years taught: 7-13
- Gender: Mixed
- Age range: 11–18
- Enrolment: 1,046 (2019)
- Capacity: 1,350
- Houses: Rowling; Hawking; Sugar; Ennis
- Colours: Burgundy and Grey
- Website: www.queensburyacademy.com

Queensbury Academy (formerly Queensbury Upper School) is an 11–18 mixed, secondary school and sixth form with academy status in Dunstable, Bedfordshire, England. It was established in 1972 and adopted its present name after becoming an academy in September 2012. It is part of the Anthem Schools Trust (formerly CfBT Schools Trust).

== History ==
Kingsbury Technical School (a mixed technical school) and Queen Eleanor's Grammar School for Girls merged in 1972 to form Queensbury Upper School, when Bedfordshire changed from a two-tier school system to a three-tier system. The first Headteacher at Queensbury was Christina Scott, who served for twelve years from 1972 until retiring in 1984.

Scott was succeeded by Keith Barker, whose tenure saw a period when the school was flagged for closure. However, the local community, including Member of Parliament David Madel, fought to keep Queensbury open and took advantage of the grant-maintained system introduced in 1988. Thus, Queensbury became the second grant-maintained school. Barker left his position in 1994 and was replaced by Bob Clayton.

Grant-maintained schools were abolished in 1998 during Clayton's tenure, so Queensbury was converted to a foundation school. During its ten years as a grant-maintained school, it grew from having meagre enrolment numbers to being heavily oversubscribed. After Clayton left his post in 2003, Deputy Head Lynn Morgan briefly served as Interim Headteacher until the arrival of Nigel Hill. During his first year as Headteacher, Hill decided to replace sugary snacks in vending machines with healthier alternatives, which gained national news attention.

Hill departed in 2012 after the school was placed into special measures by OFSTED, leading to the interim appointment of Jill Coughlan CBE as Headteacher to oversee Queensbury's conversion to an academy. This change came into effect in September 2012, and Oliver Button became the first Principal of the newly renamed Queensbury Academy. He served until 2019 when he departed and was replaced by Assistant Principal Mark Little.

In October 2022, Anthem Trust announced that Little was leaving his role as Principal at the academy. Helen Palmer was announced as the Interim Headteacher, alongside a number of changes to the school day. Helen Palmer was later made permanent Headteacher of Queensbury Academy in April 2023.

== School site ==
Because the school used to be two separate schools, the buildings are quite a distance apart and there is some duplication in rooms across the school. There are, for instance, two gyms, main halls and canteens. There are two entrances from different sides of the site, although the main entrance leading to the reception in the Central building is on Langdale Road.

Until the completion of the Central building, where there is one purpose-built staff room, there were also two staff rooms – one per building.

On Langdale Road, there is a staff entrance to the East building (the former Queen Eleanor's), and the main entrance to the Central building. Opposite Meadway there is an entrance to the West building (via Canesworde Road). The 'Central' building was added in 1999. The buildings have been updated to include IT suites in all buildings and new signage. Further recent improvements include new windows, a cafeteria area, an environmental centre and a covered outside picnic area for students.

== House system ==
The school uses a vertical house system to encourage teamwork and competition within the school, with awards and points being given to houses for various events. Each tutor group is assigned to a house. The houses are based in the two main buildings with Ennis and Rowling in the 'East' and Hawking and Sugar in the 'West'. Until 2013, the houses were named (with colours): Mead (green), Canesworde (yellow), Langdale (blue) and Hilton (red), after the four roads that surround the school site. The houses compete against each other during an annual Sports Day and occasional afternoon events.

The ties, although the same design and basic colours have a stripe in a colour representing their house. Each house is named after an influential person and these are:

- Rowling (Blue) — J. K. Rowling
- Hawking (Red) — Stephen Hawking
- Sugar (Green) — Alan Sugar
- Ennis (Yellow) — Jessica Ennis-Hill
